= Marcos Sastre =

Argentine writer (1808–1887)

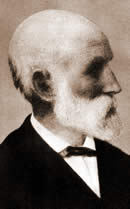
- Portrait of Marcos Sastre.
- Born: October 2, 1808; Montevideo, Viceroyalty of the Rio de la Plata
- Died: February 15, 1887 (aged 78); Buenos Aires, Argentina
- Citizenship: Argentina
- Occupation: Writer
- Writing career
- Language: Spanish

Marcos Sastre (2 October 1808, Montevideo – 15 February 1887, Buenos Aires) was an Argentine writer, born in neighboring Uruguay. He founded, along with Juan B. Alberdi, Juan María Gutiérrez and Esteban Echeverría, the Salón Literario, the beginning of the Generation of '37.

== Biography ==
He started his schooling in Montevideo, but his family moved to the city of Santa Fe in Argentina during the Portuguese occupation. He finished his secondary schooling at the Monserrat School in Córdoba, where he started his studies on art and painting.

After the war with Brazil, he returned to Montevideo, where he founded a school and published a book for the teaching of reading. He moved to Buenos Aires in 1830, and began studying law at the University of Buenos Aires, but did not finish. He studied painting with various renowned artists.

The following year, he opened a bookstore, Librería Argentina. In the back room, a new literary club, the Salón Literario ("Literary meeting room") started meeting in 1835. The regular members to the Salón were youths interested in culture, politics and the scientific progress: Miguel Cané, Juan Bautista Alberdi, Juan María Gutiérrez, Esteban Echeverría, and Vicente Fidel López. Their meetings at the beginning discussed literature, arts and fashion, influenced by the ascendancy of romanticism in Europe at the time. They also discussed politics and culture, subjects that later became the core of their meetings.

In 1837, Echeverría founded the Asociación de Mayo, at the back room of his store. The meeting was first viewed favorably by top functionaries of the Rosas government, even though they were considered suspicious by the Sociedad Popular Restauradora (Rosas' government's political arm). In the same year, the French blockade of the Río de la Plata started, which first for cultural reasons, then political, defined them as anti-Rosas. The threats of the para-military group, the Mazorca, Sastre did not flee to Montevideo, as several of his friends had done. The government's displeasure and the stopping of imports from France caused the bankruptcy of his bookstore. In 1840, Sastre published a novel, Cartas a Germania.

With his shop gone, he retired to the nearby town of San Fernando, where he opened a school in 1842. There, he conceived and wrote El Tempe Argentino, his main work as a self-taught naturalist. It was a study more literary than scientific on the flora, fauna and geography of the Paraná Delta, illustrated with engravings made by the author himself. Besides observations on flora and fauna, it contained studies on the insects, mushrooms and ferns of the region, a novelty at the time.

After a visit to his school by members of the paramilitary Mazorca, he left for Santa Fe and later to Entre Ríos, where in 1849, he founded the newspaper El Sudamericano. The following year, Governor Urquiza named him Inspector General of Schools and director of the official newspaper El Federal.

After the Battle of Caseros, which deposed Rosas, he returned to Buenos Aires, where he was named director of the public library. For his sympathies with the Urquiza government, in 1853 he was released from the post. He returned to Entre Ríos, where he became Inspector General of schools of the Argentine Confederation. He also wrote for several newspapers and published a treatise on spelling, Ortografía Completa, and another one on grammar, Lecciones de Gramática.

After the Battle of Pavón during the Argentine Civil Wars, he continued working as the director of schools for the nation. In 1865, he was named director of the Teacher's School in Entre Ríos. His last public post was as a member of the national Council on Education, where he worked until his death.

Sastre died in Buenos Aires in February 1887.

The town of Sastre, in Santa Fe Province, street names in several Argentine cities and a school on the Reconquista River, in the town of Tigre, are named after him.

== Bibliography ==
- Cutolo, Vicente Osvaldo (1968–1985). Nuevo diccionario biográfico argentino (in Spanish). Buenos Aires: Elche.
