= 1837 generation =

Argentine intellectual movement

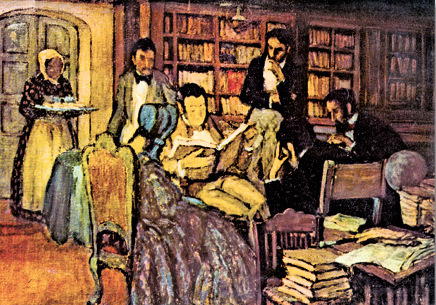
Meeting of the "Literary hall"

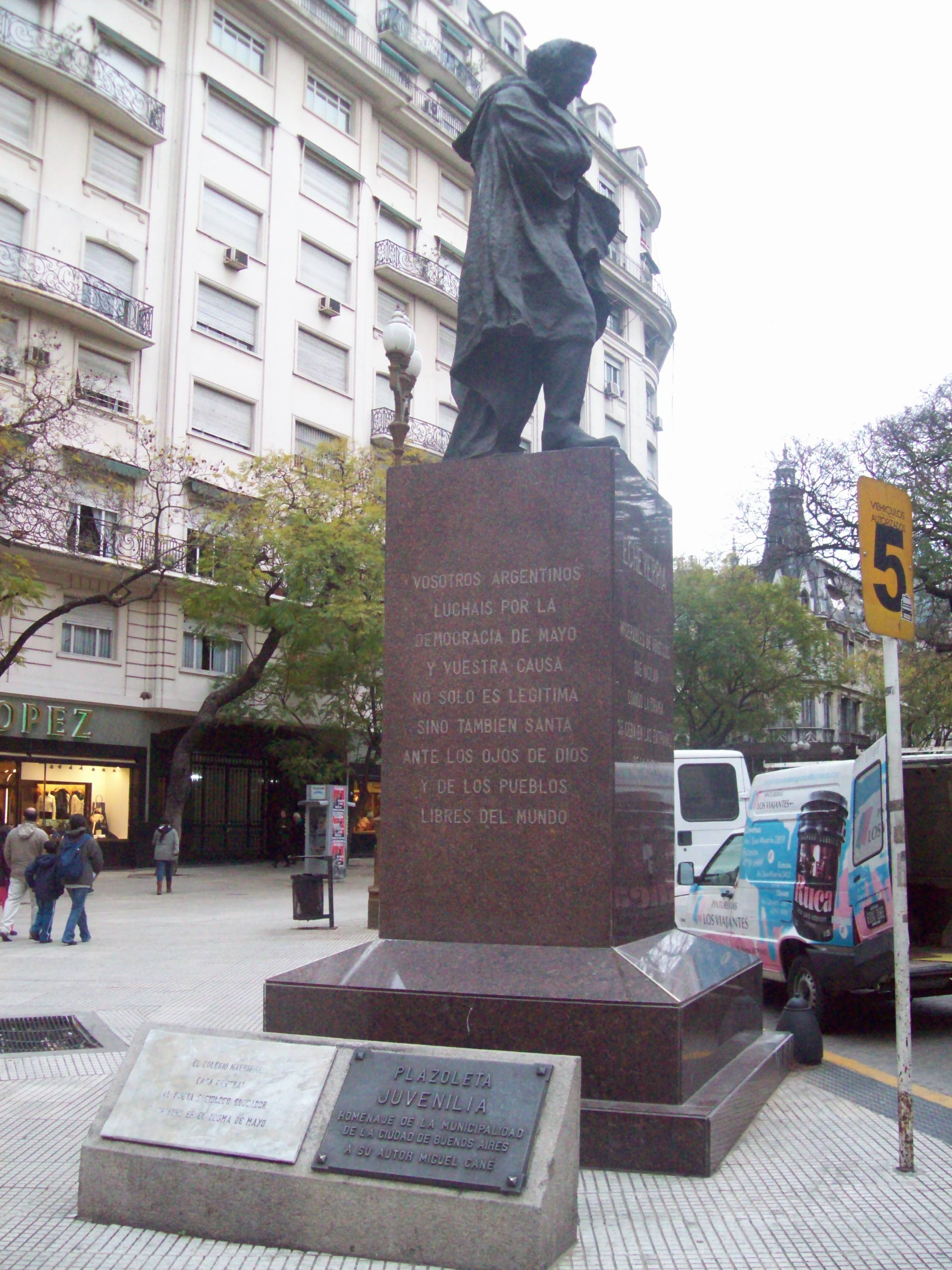
A statue in Buenos Aires honoring Esteban Echeverría remembers his words: "You Argentines fight for the May Democracy and your cause is not only legitimate but also holy in the eyes of God and the free nations of the world" (Vosotros argentinos lucháis por la democracia de Mayo y vuestra causa no sólo es legítima sino también santa ante los ojos de Dios y de los pueblos libres del mundo). On the other side it says "Slaves, or men subjected to an absolute power, don't have a homeland, because homeland is not connected to the place of birth, but in the free exercise of the citizen rights." (Los esclavos, o los hombres sometidos al poder absoluto, no tienen patria, porque la patria no se vincula a la tierra natal, sino en el libre ejercicio de los derechos ciudadanos.)

The 1837 generation (Spanish: Generación del '37) was an Argentine intellectual movement named after the date a literary hall with most of its members was established. Influenced by the new romantic ideas, they rejected the cultural Spanish heritage of the country. They did not acknowledge any national roots in the indigenous peoples or the period of European colonization, focusing instead on the Revolution as the birth of the country, as it gave them freedom, the possibility to behave as free people. They considered themselves "sons of the May Revolution", as they were born shortly before or after it, and wrote some of the earliest Argentine literary works.

The group established a literary hall in 1837 in Buenos Aires, hence the name. This Salón Literario closed six months after it was created because of the reiterated warnings from the government. Initially, they claimed to be neutral in the Argentine Civil Wars, they wrote works biased against the federalist governor Juan Manuel de Rosas (such as El Matadero by Esteban Echeverría or Facundo by Domingo Faustino Sarmiento) because Rosas was the Buenos Aires governor of that time, but they were also against the former Unitarian governments, with whom they didn't agree in their absolutist manners that they deemed a mere restoration of the manners of the Spanish colony. Their efforts to install a full democratic Republic and guarantee civil rights by means of peaceful propaganda were vain, and shortly afterwards they ended up exiled or assassinated. After Rosas was overthrown in 1852, their writings inspired the first Argentine Constitution in 1853, and the promotion of the Organización Nacional, the articulation and organization of the political divisions, infrastructure and institutions of the country.

They were called "unitarians" in a loose sense and by Rosas's propaganda.

Some notable members of this generation were Esteban Echeverría, Juan Bautista Alberdi, Juan María Gutiérrez, Domingo Faustino Sarmiento who was president between 1868 and 1874, Miguel Cané (senior), Bartolomé Mitre, Andrés Lamas, Antonio Somellera, Vicente Fidel López, Carlos Tejedor, Juan Bautista Peña, Florencio Varela, Juan Cruz Varela, José Mármol, José Rivera Indarte (Buenos Aires), Quiroga Rosas, Antonino Aberastain, Santiago Cortínez (San Juan), Benjamín Villafañe, Félix Frías (Tucumán), Francisco Álvarez, Paulino Paz, Enrique Rodríguez, Avelino Ferreyra, Ramón Ferreyra (Córdoba), Juan Thompson (Corrientes).
