= Generation of '80 =

Governing elite in Argentina from 1880 to 1916

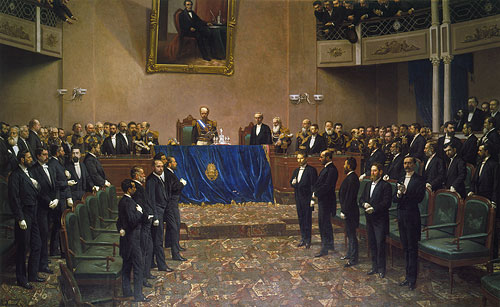
El General Roca ante el Congreso Nacional (c. 1886–1887) by Juan Manuel Blanes

The Generation of '80 (Spanish: Generación del '80) was the governing elite in Argentina from 1880 to 1916. Members of the oligarchy of the provinces and the country's capital, they first joined the League of Governors (Liga de Gobernadores), and then the National Autonomist Party, a fusion formed from the two dominating parties of the prior period, the Autonomist Party of Adolfo Alsina and the National Party of Nicolás Avellaneda. These two parties, along with Bartolomé Mitre's Nationalist Party, were the three branches into which the Unitarian Party had divided. In 1880, General Julio Argentino Roca, leader of the Conquest of the Desert and framer of the Generation and its model of government, launched his candidacy for president.

They filled the highest public political, economical, military and religious positions, staying in power through electoral fraud. In spite of the growing political opposition, led by the Radical Civic Union (UCR) and anarchist and socialist groups formed mainly by immigrant workers, the Generation of '80 managed to stay in power until the passing of the Sáenz Peña Law of secret, universal, and obligatory male suffrage, thus marking the transition into modern Argentine history.

== Ideology ==
The Generation of '80 continued the work of the "Historical Presidencies" of Mitre, Sarmiento, and Avellaneda, and took advantage of the end of the political crises and economic turbulence that had dominated the presidency of Avellaneda. The end of this turmoil laid the foundation for a society characterized by optimism and the certainty of a generous future in the years to come.

The politicians of the Generation of '80 held economically liberal and socially conservative positions, as well as believing in positivism, symbolizing their ideology with Auguste Comte's motto, "Order and Progress." The leaders of this generation believed blindly in "progress," identifying it as economic growth and modernization; "order" was considered a necessary condition for such progress, since it must be under conditions of peace that the people achieve progress. Similarly, the actions of Julio A. Roca's presidencies were founded on the motto "Peace and Administration," synthesizing both liberal and conservative thinking.

Throughout almost its entire existence, the men of the Generation of '80 believed in a destiny of indefinite progress for their country and for humanity. They hoped to see their country grow in all aspects: economically, socially, culturally, and materially. In a certain sense, they did not believe it necessary to do much more than create the conditions for this growth, since they took for granted that progress was the natural response to order. The only time this was questioned was during the Economic Crisis of 1890, but the general optimism returned soon after.

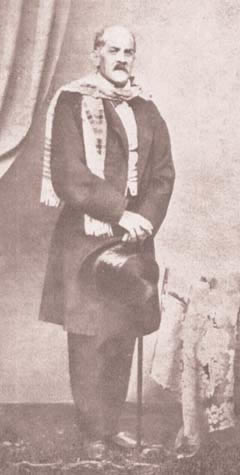
Domingo Faustino Sarmiento, author of Civilización y barbarie and key figure in the Generation of '37, later President of Argentina

Ideologically, this generation was considered to be the successor of the Generation of '37, to which their parents or grandparents had belonged – though many leaders were descended from notable characters in the rule of Juan Manuel de Rosas, who was an enemy of the Generation of '37 – and they held as dogma the principles laid out by the members of that generation. In particular, they inherited the cultural and racial prejudices from Juan Bautista Alberdi's Gobernar es poblar, the rejection of traditions from Esteban Echeverría's Tradiciones retrógada que nos subordinan al antiguo régimen, and the confrontation between civilization and barbarianism from Domingo Faustino Sarmiento's Civilización y barbarie.

The positivist ideas of the Generation of '80 were notably influenced by the thinking of Herbert Spencer, who adapted Charles Darwin's principles of evolution to the functioning of modern societies. This line of thinking became known as Social Darwinism, a theory synonymous with the phrase "survival of the fittest." Therefore, following Sarmiento's model, Gauchos and indigenous peoples were "barbarians," uncultured people incapable of appreciating the advantages of a civilized life founded in liberal principles that guaranteed the road to "progress." They believed therefore in the need to eliminate this "barbarianism" through "order" in order to strengthen the idea of "civilization," bringing in a European population to pave the way towards "progress." They did not find a moral contradiction between this and the cultural and even physical elimination of the native population, because it was the destiny of the European cultures and races – considered more "fit" for living in the modern world – to prevail over them and eventually replace the "less fit."

They Generation of '80 also clashed with the traditional positions of the Catholic Church and tried to define a separation of church and state with laws of Civil Matrimony, Civil Registry, and Common Education, the latter of which established mandatory, free, and secular primary education. These reforms demonstrated that there was never a serious attempt to completely separate Church and State, but rather to simply reduce the institutional influence that the Church had on public life. Either way, these measures brought a constant clash with the Church, defended by a small ideological group with in the Generation of '80: the Catholic leaders, such as José Manuel Estrada, Emilio Lamarca, and Pedro Goyena, who questioned the anticlerical positions of their generation's leaders, though they shared their liberal ideas.

== Expansion of the economy ==
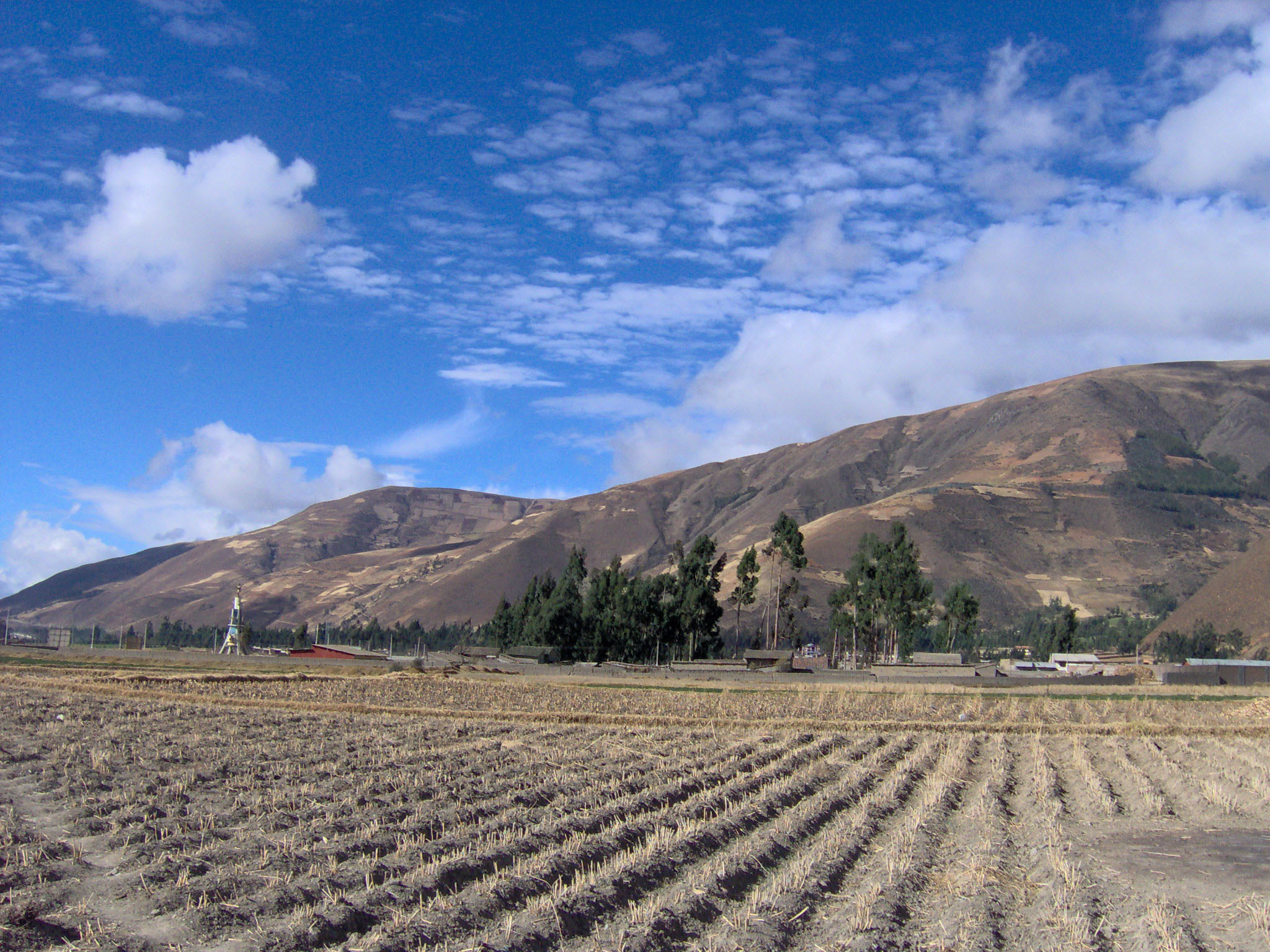
Field in the Pampas region, which produced a vast quantity of Argentine exports under the policies of the Generation of '80

The Generation of '80 created an age of economic expansion in Argentina. They put forth a liberal economic policy of agricultural exportation, which was compatible with the new international division of labor introduced by British merchants, The country concentrated its economic activity in the region of the Pampas with its center in the port city of Buenos Aires, with the goal of producing meat (from sheep and cattle), leather, wool, and grains (wheat, corn, and flax), primarily to the British market, in exchange for importing industrial goods. While 95% of its exports were agricultural products, Argentina imported 77% of its textile consumption and 67% of its metallurgic consumption. At the same time, English capital provided the funding for the majority of Argentina's logistical activities, such as banks, railways, refrigeration, etc.

In 1887, just after finishing his first presidency, Julio A. Roca visited London, meeting with several members of the British government. During his visit, Roca synthesized the relationship between Argentina and Great Britain with the following words:

I am perhaps the first former president from South America to have been the object in London of such a reception of gentlemen. I have always held a great sympathy towards England. The Argentine Republic, which will one day be a great nation, will never forget that the state of progress and prosperity that is found at this time is due in great part to English funding.

Gerchunoff and Llach have estimated that at the beginning of the 20th century, half of Argentina's GDP was made up of imports and exports. In 1888, Argentina was the sixth-largest exporter of grains and by 1907 had become third, behind only the United States and Russia. The liberal model of agricultural exportation has been criticized from various perspectives for not investing more heavily in the supply chain, especially in the textile and metallurgic sectors.

The model of agricultural exportation was implemented and maintained primarily by the ranchers in the Province of Buenos Aires (called estancieros), who organized in the Sociedad Rural Argentina, the first landowners' union in the country's history, founded in 1866. Using the chant "One Hundred Chivilcoys!" the estancieros were able to block President Sarmiento's plan to hand over lands to immigrants with the goal of establishing a system of farmers' colonies worked by their owners. President Avellaneda cancelled this plan and established the predomination of the estancia.

Nevertheless, the utilization of these liberal free-trade economic policies enacted by the government were complemented by the governing group with a clear support for State intervention in the areas that were considered essential for the social contract, such as education, justice, and public works, and the expansion of State intervention throughout the country.

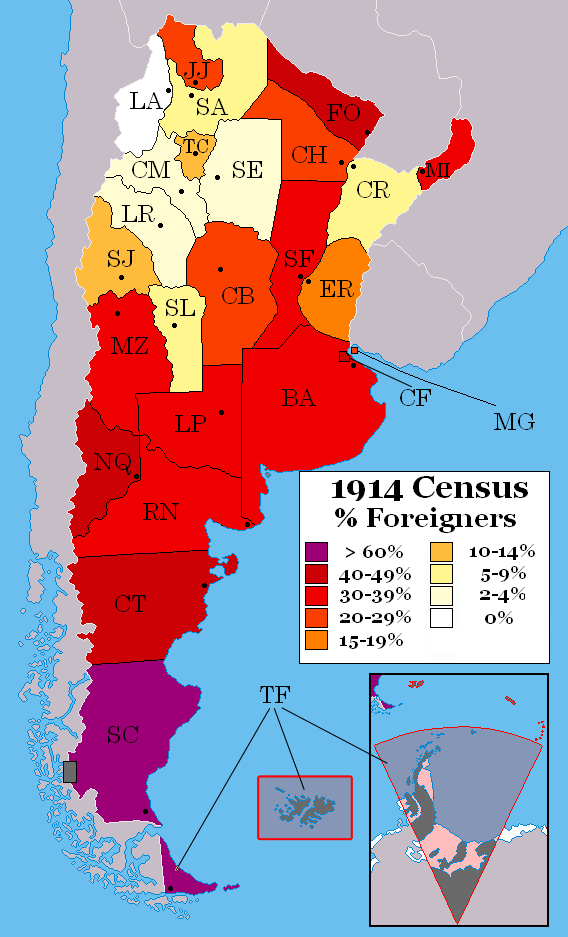
Proportion of Foreigners in Argentina by Province (1914), a direct result of the liberal immigration policies of the Generation of '80

== Expansion of the population ==
The Generation of '80 also carried out an unprecedented process of European immigration in Argentina. Various treaties with neighboring countries, such the Paraguayan War put an end to the primary conflicts regarding the country's borders, thus strengthening the control of the national territory and bringing peace to the population, as opposed to the permanent state of war that Europe was experiencing at the time. Argentina's generous and broad policy based on liberal ideas allowed for a suitable promotion of immigration, complying with the provisions contained in the Argentine Constitution. However, this regime that promoted the entry of millions of new inhabitants into the country was partially limited by repressive laws such as the 1902 Law of Residency and the 1910 Law of Social Defense with the goal of containing the expansion of socialism and anarchism.

The enormous population expansion gave rise to workers' movements that began to demand better living conditions, especially working conditions, employing the strike as a tool for social pressure. A quarter-century later, thanks to the public policies implemented by the Generation of '80, the wave of immigration would lead to a phenomenal social movement and that would bring radicalism to power.

== Fall of the Generation of '80 ==
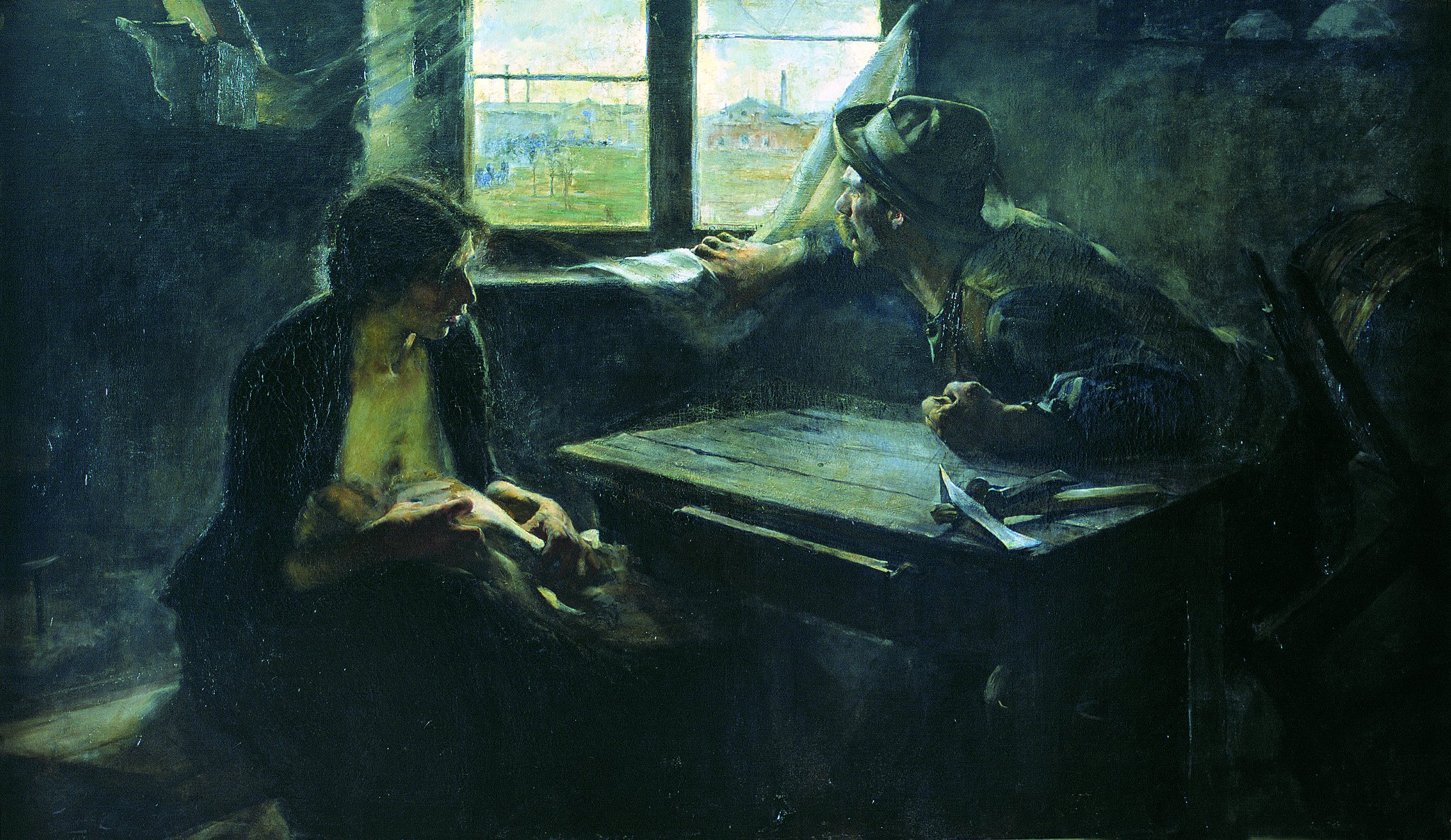
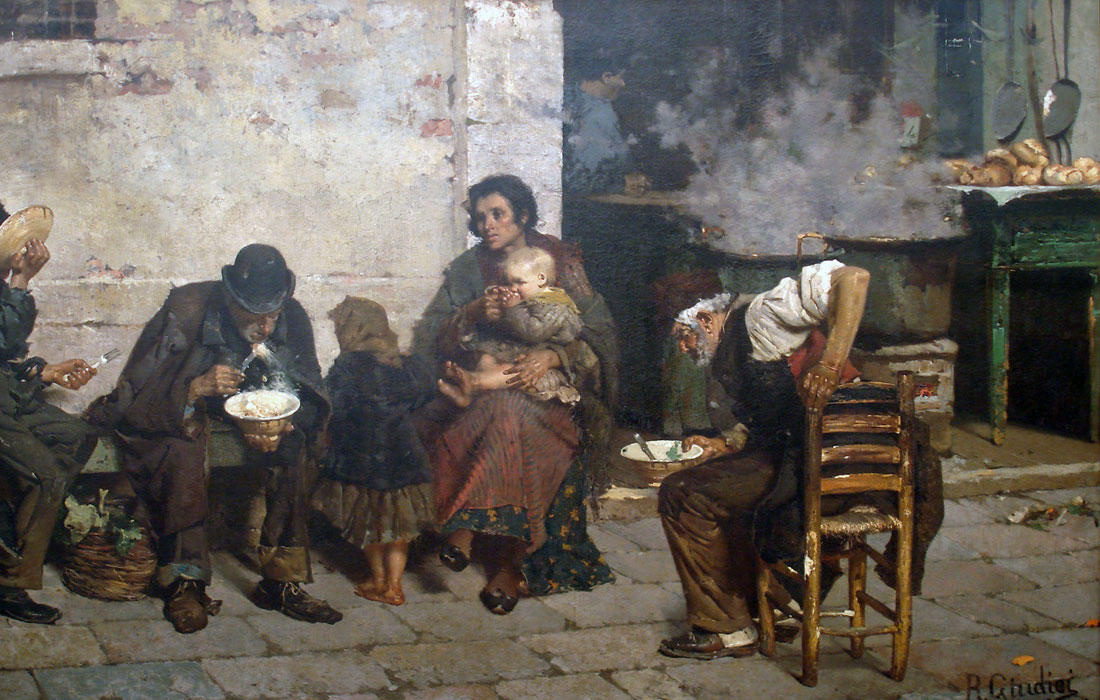
The art from this period featured the social issues of the Generation of '80. From left to right: Without bread and without work (1894) by Ernesto de la Cárcova and The soup of the poor (1884) by Reinaldo Giudici.

During the second presidency of Julio A. Roca, the Law of Residency was passed, which allowed for the immediate expulsion from the country any foreign activists who were against the regime. Roca's brother-in-law, Miguel Juárez Celman, had been overthrown in the Revolution of the Park in 1890, and in 1905, radicalism would return to arms in a coordinated uprising in several provinces. In 1910, on the centennial celebration of the May Revolution, the Law of Social Defense was passed, establishing the preventative arrest of supposed anarchists.

There were also tepid advances in the government to attempt to calm the workers' demands, such as the creation of the National Department of Labor in 1907. Thus, it was conservatism that issued the first labor laws of the era, though they would turn out to be insufficient given the significant development in the labor sector, a product of massive immigration and economic growth.

Facing growing demands of the middle class, constant strikes, and criticism from the press and Congress, the Generation of '80, at the time led by the modernist line of the National Autonomist Party, found it necessary to respond to the new reality and extended political participation with the passing of the Sáenz Peña Law in 1912, establishing secret, universal, and mandatory suffrage for males over 18. In 1916, in the first elections in which the new law applied, the conservative regime lost presidential elections for the first time, ceding power to the radical Hipólito Yrigoyen, who assumed his first presidency with the backing of the majority of the Argentine middle class.

== Concept of the Generation of '80 ==
The term "Generation of '80" appeared for the first time throughout the 1920s, and it referred to a literary generation. In his Historia de la Literatura Argentina, Ricardo Rojas gave this group its name in a secondary manner, since the group that would be called the Generation of '80 was called "Los Modernos." The first author to group the authors of this era together with the name "Generation of '80" was Arturo Giménez Pastor, in a work titled Los del 80. While the name was used especially for authors, it also mentioned intellectuals and scientists. Around the same time, historian Rómulo Carbia, in his Historia crítica de la historiografía argentina, grouped together the historians of the period as "Los ensayistas,"or "The essayists." Finally, in two articles appearing in the newspaper La Nación at the end of the 1930s, Manuel Mujica Lainez mentions the "Generation of '80" with its current meaning, though limited to the literary world.

The distinctive feature that the majority of the writers from this time were also highly imaginative politicians allowed this term to extend to politics, but this process wasn't provided much clarity until the mid-1950s, when Carlos Ibarguren referred to the combination of intellectuals and politicians of the era with this name. The term was also used by leftist historians such as Jorge Abelardo Ramos in Revolución y contrarrevolución en la Argentina (1957) and Enrique Barba in a 1959 article, which declared this generation as a direct descendant of the Generation of '37 for its ideas and philosophy. The precise reaches of the term "Generation of '80" as a collection of oligarchical intellectual leaders tied to cattle production, consciously inheriting the ideas of the Generation of '37, came at the hand of David Viñas in Literatura argentina y realidad política: Apogeo de la oligarquía (1964). In El desarrollo de las ideas en la Argentina del siglo XX, José Luis Romero spoke of the Generation of '80 as though it was already a well-known concept by the reader.

From 1970 on, the term would be used in the sense that Viñas gave it, with nuances more or less favorable or unfavorable according to the author's point of view. However, beginning in this period, certain ambiguities arose in regards to the limits of who belonged to this generation and who did not. Identifying the Generation of '80 as the broad period occurring between 1880 and 1916 would include the younger leaders and intellectuals from the early 20th Century, who demonstrated a clearly different orientation to that of their predecessors. Therefore, it would not fit to include them in the Generation of '80. For example, the intellectuals and scientists did not have political ambitions, with very few exceptions.

== Bibliography ==
- Bruno, Paula (May–August 2007), "Un balance acerca del uso de la expresión generación del 80 entre 1920 y 2000", Secuencia. Revista de Historia y Ciencias Sociales – Instituto de Investigaciones "Dr. José María Luis Mora" (68), México DF: 117–161
