= Historiography of Argentina =

The Historiography of Argentina is composed of the works of the authors that have written about the History of Argentina. The first historiographical works are usually considered to be those by Bartolomé Mitre and other authors from the middle 19th century.

== History ==
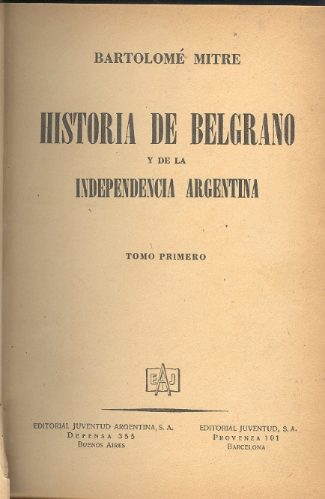
Historia de Belgrano y de la Independencia Argentina, one of the first books about the History of Argentina

The pre-Columbian indigenous populations of Argentina did not develop writing, and had no written records of events. There have been written records of events since the time of the first European arrivals to Argentine territory, but most of them were referred to ongoing events or very close ones and are not considered to be real historiographical works.

The first authors to write about events long past were the members of the "'37 Generation", romantic authors born by the time of the May Revolution, who were educated in the time of the unitarian government of Bernardino Rivadavia. By that time they received a secular education and shared studies with students from other provinces, which promoted in them a national view over a localist one. At first they tried to act as an enlightened influence beyond the unitarian-federalist dichotomy, but the increased strengthening of the policies of Juan Manuel de Rosas made most of them flee into exile to foreign countries. Thus, those authors are considered with care, as they were distant enough from the events of the Argentine War of Independence but still contemporary of the Argentine Civil War and the government of Rosas, making their opinions about the later to be of a political nature. Those authors tried to adapt the European Romantic nationalism to the Argentine context, and develop a national identity. As they despised both Rosas and the Spanish heritage, they aimed their efforts in glorifying the events and peoples of the Revolution.

One of the first works done for this purpose was Historia de Belgrano y de la Independencia Argentina (Spanish: History of Belgrano and of the Independence of Argentina), by Bartolomé Mitre. This book was criticized by Vicente Fidel López, Dalmacio Vélez Sársfield or Juan Bautista Alberdi, who would write other books in answer, and Mitre would reply with more books strengthening his perspectives. Rómulo Carbia described this dispute in 1925 as a dispute between "philosophists" and "erudits", with Vicente López, Lucio López and José Manuel Estrada in the first group and Mitre, Luis Domínguez, Paul Groussac the new historical school and Carbia himself. Such book was used for self-affiliation and legitimization, but became canonical afterwards.

=== 1910 ===
The first centennial of the May Revolution was a period of transition. Three new concerns were added to the historiographical view: the social, political and national issue:

- Social issues were motivated by the massive immigration wave of the time and the rise of leftist, socialist and anarchist movements; and influenced a bigger concern about the role of society itself in the events of history, which so far had been described around key figures.
- The national issue was the need to define, in a time when the majority of the population was foreign immigrants, the identity of the country and its role in the world.
- The political concern derives from the fact that none of the historians from this periods works exclusively in the historiographical fields, and had steady political works at the same time. Despite keeping a rigorous scientific approach, their works were marked by their political views: when Ramos Mejía rote about the popular participation and how it led to either the May Revolution or the tyranny of Rosas, he was indirectly pointing his opinions about popular participation in his own context. This period ends by 1920, with the creation of the New Historical School.

Historiography would take two main divergent paths since then. On one side, the state would sponsor Ricardo Levene and the National Academy of History into writing a definitive and unquestionable version of national history, which follows the most important basic features of the one designed by Mitre and was deemed as "official history" because of its state-sponsored nature. The opposing viewpoint was held by a number of revisionist authors, who wrote the history of Argentina from a nationalist and anti-liberalist perspective. Those authors restored the image of Juan Manuel de Rosas, rejected by previous authors, considering him an example of defense of national sovereignty. Former national heroes like Bernardino Rivadavia, Justo José de Urquiza, Bartolomé Mitre and Domingo Faustino Sarmiento were accused instead of favoring foreign imperialism. The concepts about the revolutionary period, on the other hand, weren't modified very much, and José de San Martín was exalted as strongly as by their historiographical adversaries.

== See also ==
- Historiography § Latin America
- History of Argentina
- Historiography of Juan Manuel de Rosas
