= Elementos de derecho público provincial argentino =

Elementos de Derecho Público provincial argentino (English: Elements of Argentine provincial civic law) is an 1852 Argentine book by Juan Bautista Alberdi. It is a comparison between the Argentine Constitution of 1826 and the United States Constitution. The book complements his other book Bases y puntos de partida para la organización política de la República Argentina (Spanish: Bases and starting points for the political organization of the Argentine republic), which influenced the Constitution of Argentina of 1853.

== Bibliography ==
- Luqui-Lagleyze, Julio Mario (2010). Grandes biografías de los 200 años: Juan Bautista Alberdi. Argentina: Clarín. ISBN 978-987-07-0842-1.
