= The Slaughter Yard =

Short story by Esteban Echeverría

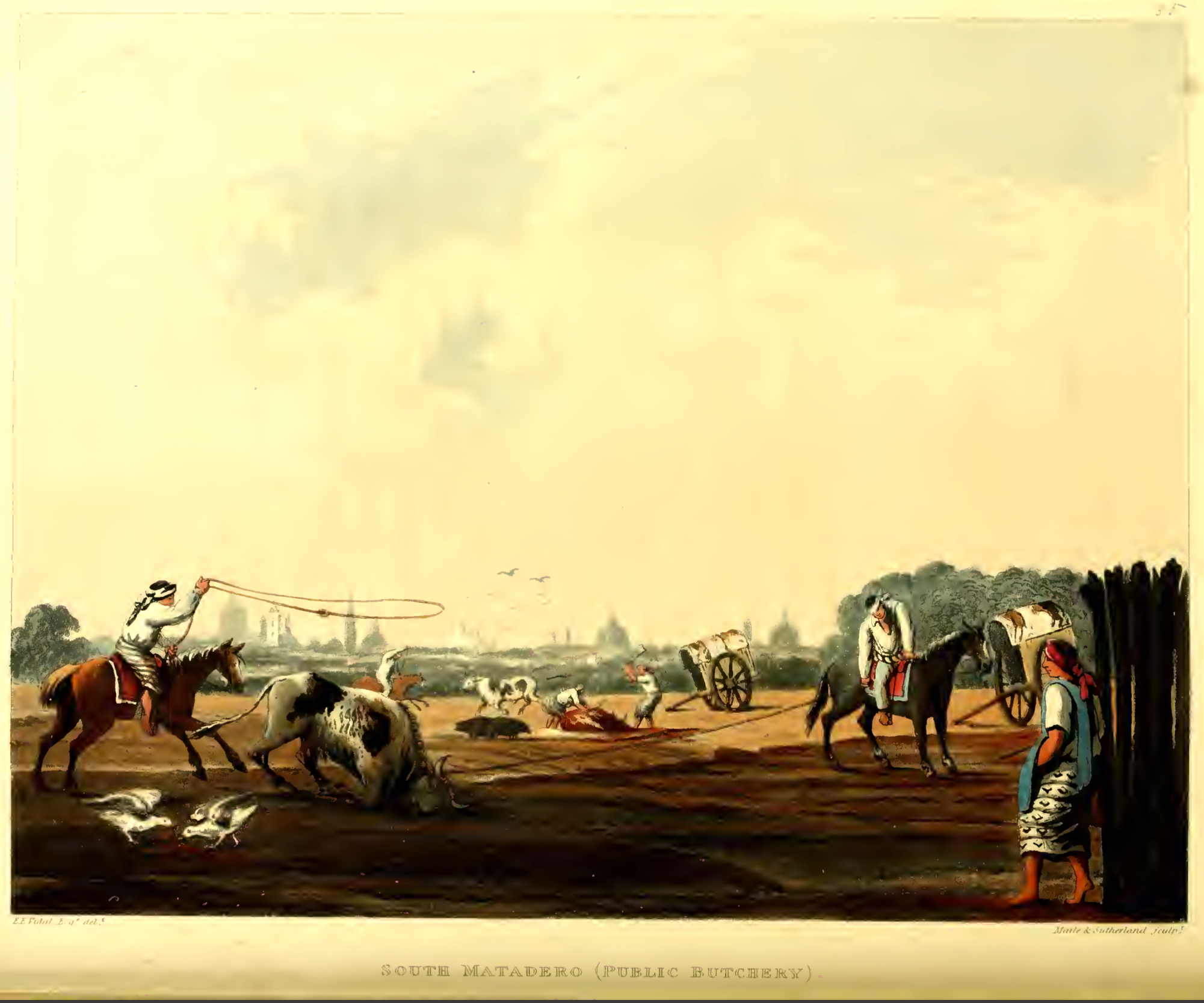
The South Matadero, Buenos Aires (water colour by Emeric Essex Vidal, 1820). The story was set there about 20 years later.

The Slaughter Yard (Spanish El matadero) is a short story by the Argentine poet and essayist Esteban Echeverría (1805–1851). The first Argentine work of prose fiction, it is one of the most studied texts in Latin American literature. Written in exile and published posthumously in 1871, it is an attack on the dictatorial regime of Juan Manuel de Rosas and his parapolice thugs, the Mazorca.

In the story, the protagonist is seized by a crowd of brutal slaughtermen for belonging to the political opposition, and dies at their hands.

== Text and publication history ==
El Matadero was first published posthumously in 1871 in the Revista del Río de la Plata, a Buenos Aires literary magazine, together with introductory notes by the literary critic Juan María Gutiérrez. Gutiérrez, a friend, said he had found the manuscript amongst the author's papers, and described it as a hurried sketch. The manuscript has never been found and it has been argued that Gutiérrez should be regarded as a co-author of the work as it now exists (below, "Challenge to the traditional view").

In 1874, Gutiérrez republished the story as part of a uniform edition of Echeverría's works. The text is not the same. It may be downloaded here.

There is an English translation by Norman Thomas di Giovanni and Susan Ashe (2010).

=== Title ===
The title is often translated as "The Slaughterhouse" but this is inaccurate. A matadero need not be a building and in Echeverría's time cattle were slaughtered in Buenos Aires in open stockyards, as described by William Henry Hudson and depicted by Emeric Essex Vidal (title image).

== Plot ==
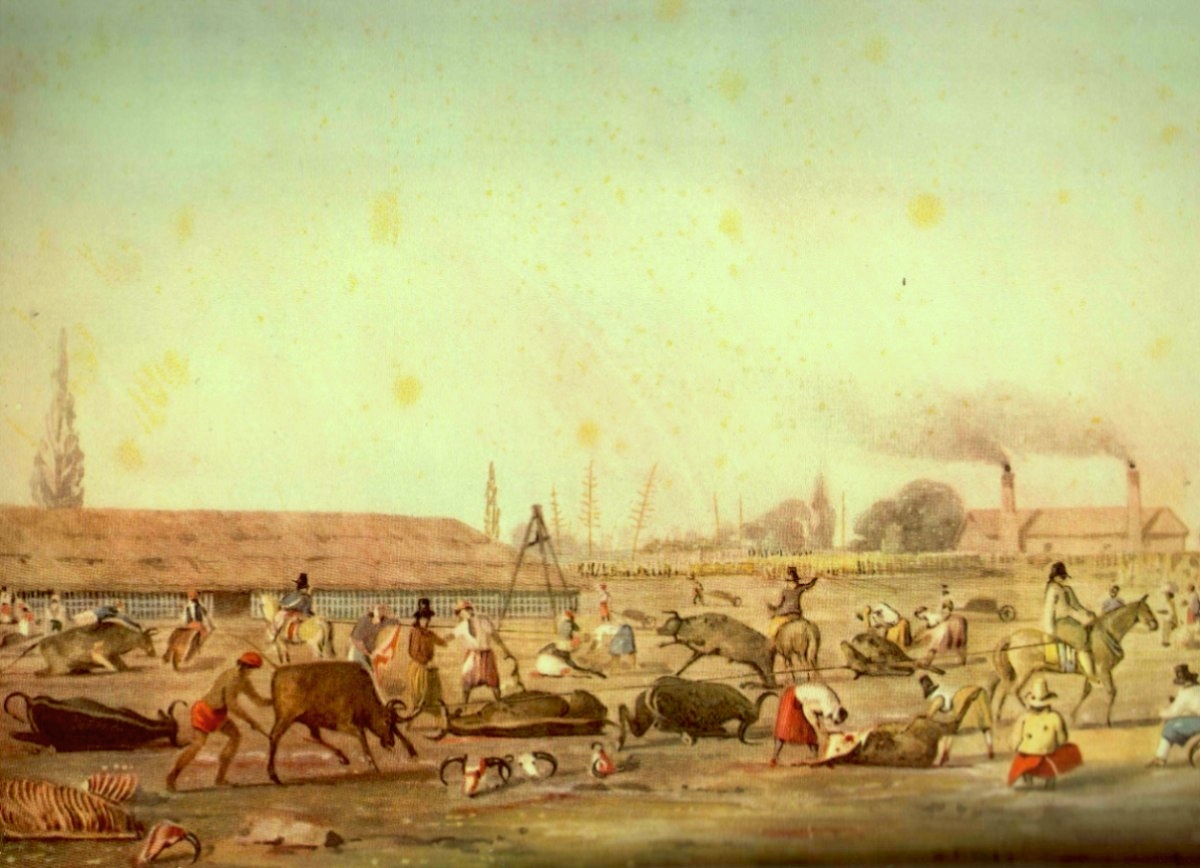
Alternative setting for El Matadero (Carlos Pellegrini, watercolour, c. 1830)

We are in Buenos Aires during dictator Juan Manuel de Rosas' reign of terror. It is Lent when meat is forbidden to Catholics. Nevertheless, fifty steers are ordered to be slaughtered: the corrupt, Rosas-upholding clergy have given many dispensations.

The squalor and brutality of the slaughter yard are described. There is glutinous mud. There are rats, dogs, seagulls and low humans disputing over scraps of offal. In what may have symbolic significance, one animal of the fifty proves to be an intact bull: instead of going tamely to slaughter, he fiercely resists. A child is accidentally decapitated.

A young man dressed according to the conventions of the proscribed Unitario political party rides by. (It is never explained why. To dress thus is blatantly illegal, and the denizens of the slaughter yard are fanatical Rosas supporters. Some critics have described the story as a dream sequence.)

The crowd seizes the young man and is about to cut his throat. But the Slaughter Yard Judge, who enjoys absolute power in this, his little domain, orders him to be taken for interrogation. The defiant protagonist hurls imprecations at the crowd. The Judge orders him to be stripped and tied to a table. We are given to understand that the young man is about to be sodomised with a rod (verga) or a corncob (Spanish mazorca, also the nickname of Rosas' parapolice thugs). In a paroxysm of rage the young man bursts a blood vessel and dies. "Poor devil: we only wanted to amuse ourselves and he took it too seriously" says the Judge "with a tiger frown".

== Significance in Latin American literature ==
According to the American editor, translator and Borges collaborator Norman Thomas di Giovanni, "Esteban Echeverría's El matadero, written towards the end of the 1830s, is chronologically the first work of Argentine prose fiction…. Owing in part to its brevity – a mere 6,000 or so words – it may be the most studied school text in all Latin American literature. It is certainly known and acclaimed beyond the borders of Argentina."

For Borges himself, who wrote a foreword to one edition, "In Echeverría's text there is a sort of hallucinatory realism, which can recall the great shadows of Hugo and Herman Melville".

A 1998 survey of U.S. universities found the work was required graduate reading at 73% of Ph.D.-granting Spanish faculties, the highest score for any Spanish American nineteenth century work of fiction. (Note: Brown and Johnson obtained results for the 56 top-rated faculties. (They mistakenly classified El matadero as a novel instead of a short story, but it would have scored top in either category.))

Echeverría's oeuvre extends to five printed volumes, but his literary prestige chiefly depends on this single short story.

== Historicity ==
Although The Slaughter Yard is a story, it is based on some elements of fact. English-speaking memorialists described the setting (the south Matadero shown in the Vidal image) and their accounts corroborate many of Echeverría's details. The clergy indeed upheld Rosas' dictatorship. (Note: Rosas kept papal jurisdiction out of Argentina and appointed the clergy himself: he expected it to serve the Federalist cause. In fact, the clergy willingly supported the Rosas regime, except for the Jesuits, whom he later expelled for that reason (Lynch, 84-85).) It was indeed compulsory to display rosista emblems including "Death to the savage unitarios. (Note: Men were obliged to wear red silk badges with the inscription: "Long live the Argentine Confederation. Death to the Savage Unitarians". (Lynch, 83).) The butchers in the slaughter yards were indeed staunch Rosas supporters and did supply thugs for his Mazorca. The Mazorca did use the corncob as an instrument of torture. Further, according to Gutiérrez

The scene of the "savage unitario" in the power of the Judge of the Slaughter Yard and his myrmidons is not an invention but a reality that happened more than once in that ill-fated era. The only thing in this picture that can have been the author's invention would be the moral appreciation of the circumstances, the language and the victim's conduct, which functions as the noble poet would have done himself in an analogous situation.

== Writing and publication ==
=== Traditional view ===
It is frequently said that Echeverría wrote "The Slaughter Yard" at some time in 1838–40. Although he had fled to Uruguay the long arm of Rosas could still reach him there; according to Echeverría's friend Juan María Gutiérrez, who was afterwards rector of the University of Buenos Aires, "If the story had fallen into the hands of Rosas its author would have disappeared immediately." Gutiérrez, who said he personally examined the manuscript, added:

He well knew the risk he was running, but it could have been rage, more than fear, that produced his trembling handwriting, which is almost illegible in the original manuscript.

It was Gutiérrez who edited the work for publication in 1871.

=== Challenge to the traditional view ===
That Echeverría did not publish the story because he feared assassination was denied by Cabañas, who argued that Echeverría was exiled in Uruguay where he published equally offensive works. Rather, the story did not fit Echeverría's aesthetic sensibility.

The traditional view (that the story was written by Echeverría alone around the time of its setting) was challenged by Emilio Carilla in 1993. Carilla acknowledged that Gutiérrez had a venerable reputation as a man of letters. But he pointed out that Gutierrez had a habit of unilaterally "correcting" the works of the authors he edited (for editors of that era, his was a not uncommon failing); supplying copious examples. He also noted that – according to his own admission: in a private letter to Alberdi – Gutiérrez wrote and published a detailed book review of Sarmiento's Facundo before he had read the book! As regards "The Slaughter Yard", said Carilla:

1. The manuscript of the story has never been found.
2. It cannot be found amongst Gutierrez's collection of Echeverría's papers.
3. There is no positive evidence that the manuscript was ever seen by anyone, apart from Gutiérrez and (presumably) Echeverría himself.
4. Therefore, critics have had to take Gutierrez's text and account on trust.
5. Before 1871, when discussing Echeverría's works, Gutierrez not so much as mentioned the most important item: "The Slaughter Yard". Presumably, he did not acquire the MS until about that year.
6. In his own writings Echeverría never mentioned "The Slaughter Yard" either.

Therefore, for Carilla, it was surprising that critics had assumed "The Slaughter Yard" was composed around 1838-40: that was merely the time in which the story was set. It could equally well have been written at any time up to Echeverría's death in 1851 – shortly before the dictator Rosas was overthrown. Hence, although it was tempting to regard "The Slaughter House" as a work composed at the height of Rosas' state terrorism, there was really no evidence that it was.

Carllla then turned to Gutierrez's editorial notes on the story. According to Gutierrez, the manuscript had not been intended for publication but as a sketch for a poem Echeverría had intended to write, "as is proved by the haste and carelessness with which it had been drawn up". But that, said Carilla, is absurd, for the published text of "The Slaughter Yard" is pretty well flawless. We may therefore suspect that Gutierrez himself had to do with the composition of the story. And the proof is in the story's last paragraph:

In those days the throat-cutting butchers of the Slaughter Yard were the advocates who spread the rosista Federation by rod and dagger ... They used to call a savage unitario ... anyone who was not a cutthroat, butcher, nor savage, nor thief, every decent man with a good heart, every enlightened patriot friend of light and liberty ...

That, said Carilla, must have been written after the Rosas dictatorship, and by Gutierrez himself. Gutiérrez was a collaborator, a joint author of "The Slaughter Yard".

== Genre ==
There is endless discussion about the literary type or genre to which "The Slaughter House" belongs: story, novel of manners, essay or hybrid. For German scholar Christian Wehr, "The Slaughter Yard" is the foundational text of an autochthonous Latin American genre he called Diktatorenromans : the dictator novel.

== Vernacular dialogue ==
The protagonist speaks in elite literary Spanish; but the slaughter yard denizens (including the Judge) use the direct street Spanish of low class Buenos Aires. It is probably the earliest record of the emerging Lunfardo, the colloquial speech of the city.

The story contains the first recorded instance of the use of the characteristic Argentine interjection che, in the following sentence

—Ché! negra bruja, salí de aquí antes que te pegue un tajo, esclamaba el carnicero.

("Hey, you black witch, get out of here before I slash you", exclaimed the butcher.)

== Readings and symbolism ==
In its immediate or obvious meaning it is simply a story of biting political criticism: almost as obvious is the symbolism of the slaughter yard as a microcosm of Rosas' polity where, but for the hero and the one bull who does have cojones, all are easily controlled. However all sorts of interpretations or symbolic meanings have been sought: Freudian, as a necessary ritual sacrifice, as an item in "Argentina's necrophilic catalogue", as a racist attack on Rosas' Afro-Argentines, from a feminist perspective, and as Echeverría's (and indeed his political school's) crisis of masculinity.
