= Elvira Aldao de Díaz =

Argentine writer (1858 – 1950)

Elvira Aldao de Díaz (1858 – 1950) was an Argentine writer of the Generation of 80. She was born in Rosario, into a military family. She spent her formative years in Buenos Aires before moving back to Rosario, where she became familiar with local writers and artists. Her family also had property in Mar del Plata where she spent many summers. In 1912 she travelled to Europe, spending several years there before returning to Argentina. She died in Mar del Plata in 1950.

Aldao is primarily remembered as a chronicler of local customs and the elite society of her era, especially in books such as Recuerdos de Antano and Veraneos Marplatenses.

== Works ==
- Mientras ruge el huracán.
- Horas de guerra y horas de paz.
- Veraneos marplatenses : de 1887 a 1923.
- Esplendores del Centenario : relatos de la elite argentina desde Europa y Estados Unidos.
- Recuerdos dispersos.
- Reminiscencias sobre Aristóbulo del Valle.
- Cartas íntimas (correspondencia con Lisandro de la Torre).
- Recuerdos de antaño.
- Cartas de dos amigas (1935).
- París : 1914-1919.
