= Grandes y pequeños hombres del Plata =

1864 book by Juan Bautista

Grandes y pequeños hombres del Plata (Spanish: Great and tiny men of the De la Plata basin) is an 1864 Argentine book written by Juan Bautista Alberdi. It is a harsh criticism of the books Historia de Belgrano y de la Independencia Argentina by Bartolomé Mitre and Facundo by Domingo Faustino Sarmiento.
