= San Martín Department, Santa Fe =

San Martín Department
- Department
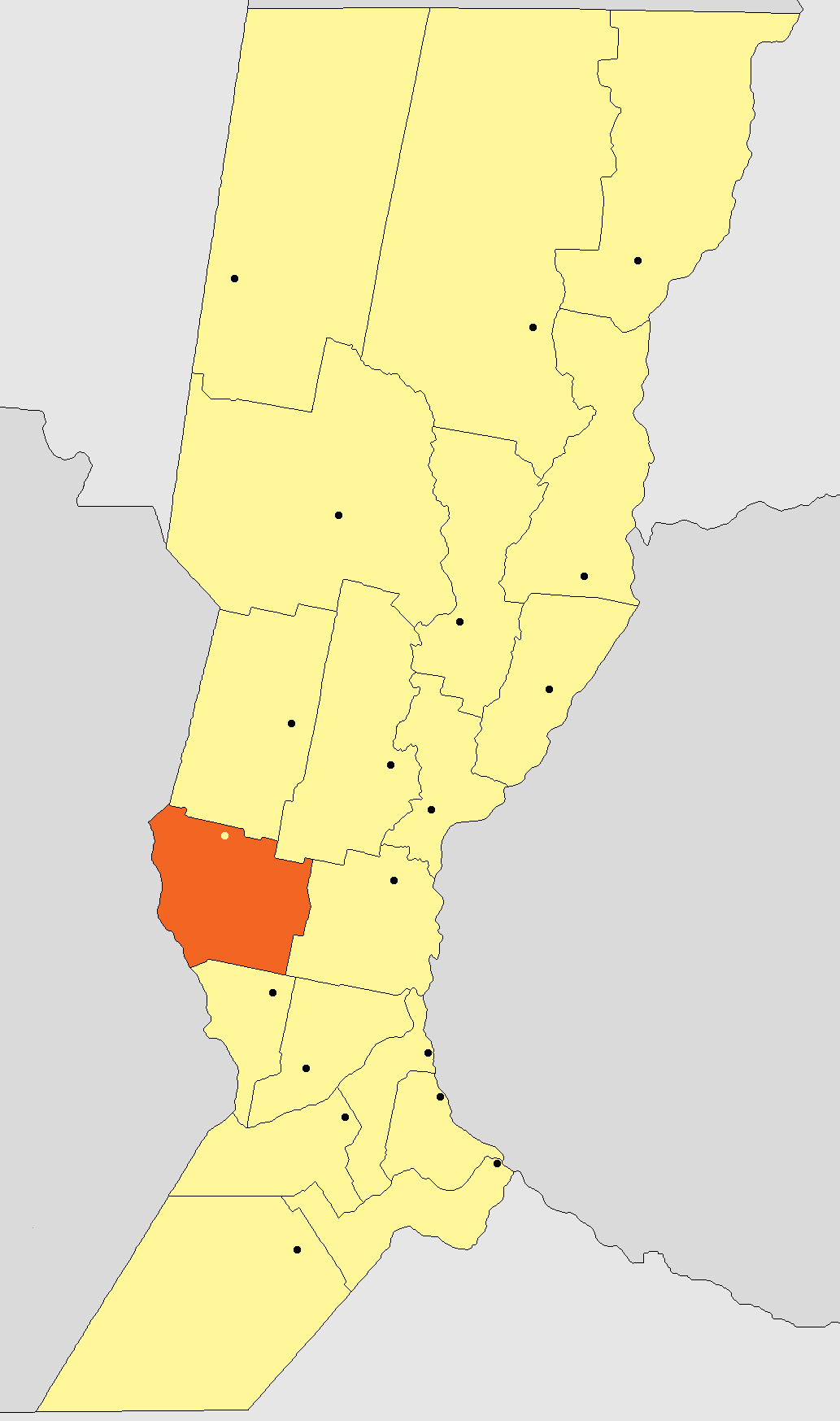
- Location of San Martín Department within Santa Fe Province
- Coordinates: 31°45′S 61°50′W
- Country: Argentina
- Province: Santa Fe
- Head town: Sastre

Area
  - Total: 4,860 km^{2} (1,880 sq mi)

Population
  - Total: 60,698
  - Density: 12.5/km^{2} (32.3/sq mi)
- Time zone: UTC-3 (ART)

The San Martín Department (in Spanish, Departamento San Martín) is an administrative subdivision (departamento) of the province of Santa Fe, Argentina. It is located in the center-south of the province. It limits with the departments of Castellanos (north), Las Colonias (north-east), San Jerónimo (east), and Belgrano (south); the western limit coincides with the interprovincial border between Santa Fe and Córdoba.

The department has over 60,000 inhabitants. Its head town is Sastre. Other towns and cities are Cañada Rosquín, Carlos Pellegrini, Casas, Castelar, Colonia Belgrano, Crispi, El Trébol, Landeta, Las Bandurrias, Las Petacas, Los Cardos, María Susana, Piamonte, San Jorge, San Martín de las Escobas, and Traill.
