= Bernardo Frías =

Argentine jurist, politician and historian

President of Superior Tribunal de Justicia (Salta Province)

Cámara de Justicia

Personal details
- Born: Bernardo Frías Mollinedo; August 12, 1866; Salta, Argentina
- Died: December 17, 1930 (aged 64); Salta, Argentina
- Education: University of Buenos Aires (Licentiate, JD)

Bernardo Frías Mollinedo (12 August 1866 – 17 December 1930) was an Argentine jurist, politician and historian.

== Biography ==
Frías was born in Salta to Benigno Frías and Juana Martínez de Mollinedo, both pertaining to traditional families of the province. Having successfully attended high school at Colegio Nacional, he moved to Buenos Aires where he pursued a career in Law and met his future friend Lucio Vicente López. It was at the University of Buenos Aires at age 27 that he obtained a JD in private law with a thesis named "Obligaciones y responsabilidades del iniquilino," under the tutelage of Indalecio Gómez (co-author of 1912 Sáenz Peña Law).

Having returned to the province where he was born, Frías was appointed as a judge and became a pedagogue in parallel to his judicial career. His various teaching activities, directed toward teenagers as well as female teachers, provided him with a firm interest in the history of his province, which would later develop into his six-volume magnum opus Historia del General Martín Miguel de Güemes y de la Provincia de Salta o sea de la Independencia Argentina. Frías agreed with numerous historians that Martín Güemes was a key figure in the process of South American independence. In the specific field of historiography he advocated federalism as opposed to the works of Vicente Fidel López.

In 1902 Frías was elected as a representative for the Province Congress. Finally he died in 1930 shortly after being designated as a Minister of the Corte de Justicia (Court of Justice).

== Books ==
=== History ===
- Historia del General Martín Güemes y de la Provincia de Salta, o sea de la Independencia Argentina (six volumes). [Re-edited in 2017]
- Biografía del doctor Francisco de Gurruchaga, creador de la Marina de Guerra
- El Convento de San Bernardo de Salta
- Tradiciones Históricas
- Crónicas y Apuntes

=== Poetry ===
- Mis versos

=== Fiction ===
- La colegiala (novel)
