= Historia de Belgrano y de la Independencia Argentina =

1857 book by Bartolomé Mitre

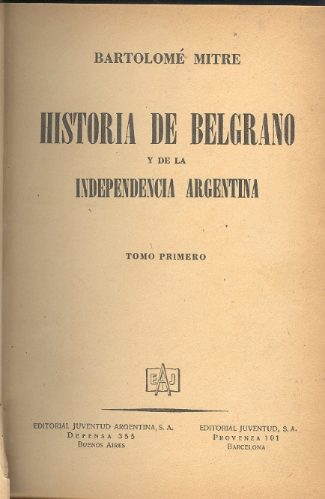
- Author: Bartolomé Mitre
- Language: Spanish
- Subject: Manuel Belgrano
- Genre: Biography
- Publication date: 1857
- Publication place: Argentina
- Followed by: Historia de San Martín y de la emancipación sudamericana

Historia de Belgrano y de la Independencia Argentina (English: History of Belgrano and Argentine Independence) is an Argentine history book written by Bartolomé Mitre. It is mainly a biography of Manuel Belgrano, but the author expanded the scope to the whole Argentine War of Independence, where Belgrano was involved. It was the first book about the history of Argentina, and as such the starting point of the historiography of Argentina.

The work was the result of a collaborative intellectual effort. In the preface to the second edition of 1859, Mitre recognized the contribution of Andrés Lamas, Carlos Calvo, Juan María Gutiérrez, Florencio Varela, and Domingo Faustino Sarmiento, among others, as part of the process of creating early Argentine historiography.

Historian José Luis Romero described the work as "at once the life of a man and the history of an epoch," as Mitre was motivated by fundamental questions about the legitimacy of national unification and the historical course that had led to the present day in Argentina. The book also features the first publication of Belgrano's autobiography, which had previously been unavailable to scholars and the public.

When it was published, the book generated controversies between the author and Dalmacio Vélez Sarsfield and Juan Bautista Alberdi.
