= Sastre, Santa Fe =

Sastre
- Town
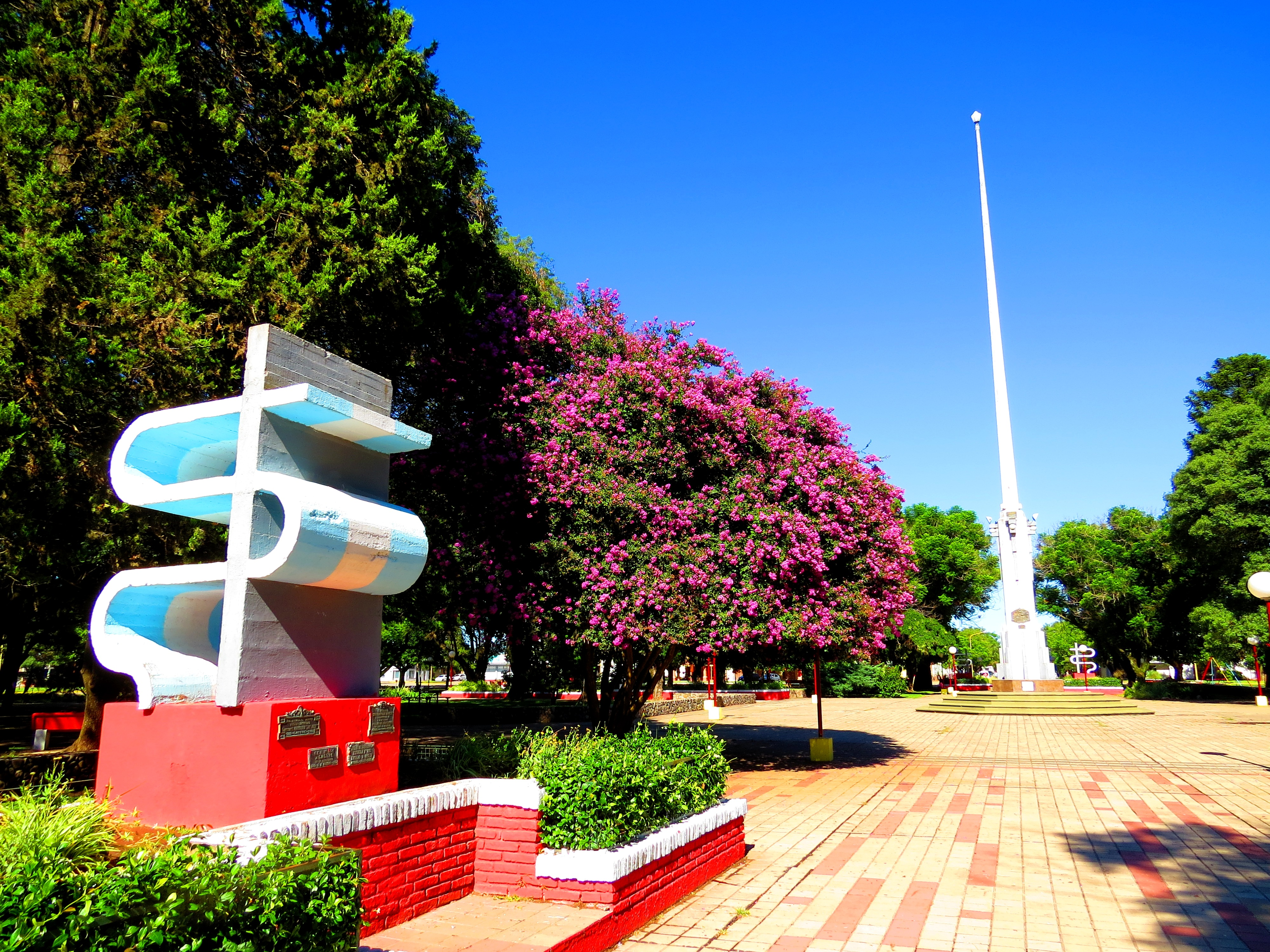

- Location of Sastre in Argentina
- Coordinates: 31°45′S 61°50′W
- Country: Argentina
- Province: Santa Fe
- Department: San Martín

Government
  - Intendant: Maria del Carmen Brunazzo (Justicialist Party)

Area
  - Total: 289 km^{2} (112 sq mi)

Population
  - Total: 5,534
  - Density: 19.1/km^{2} (49.6/sq mi)
- Time zone: UTC−3 (ART)
- CPA base: S2440
- Dialing code: +54 3406

Sastre is a town (comuna) in the west of the province of Santa Fe, Argentina, 139 km (86 mi) west from the provincial capital. It had about 5,500 inhabitants at the 2001 census [INDEC] and it is the head town of the San Martín Department.

It is named after Marcos Sastre, a renowned Argentine lawyer, writer, and educator. Miguel Brascó, the noted Argentine writer and food critic, hails from Sastre.

== Twin towns ==
Sastre is twinned with:

- Alba, Piedmont, Italy (1988)
