= Sobre la conveniencia de un Congreso General Americano =

Sobre la conveniencia de un Congreso General Americano (Spanish: About the convenience of a General American Congress) is an 1844 book by Juan Bautista Alberdi. The book proposed Pan-Americanism based on a joint work in national customs.

== Bibliography ==
- Luqui-Lagleyze, Julio Mario (2010). Grandes biografías de los 200 años: Juan Bautista Alberdi. Argentina: Clarín. ISBN 978-987-07-0842-1.
