= Miguel Brascó =

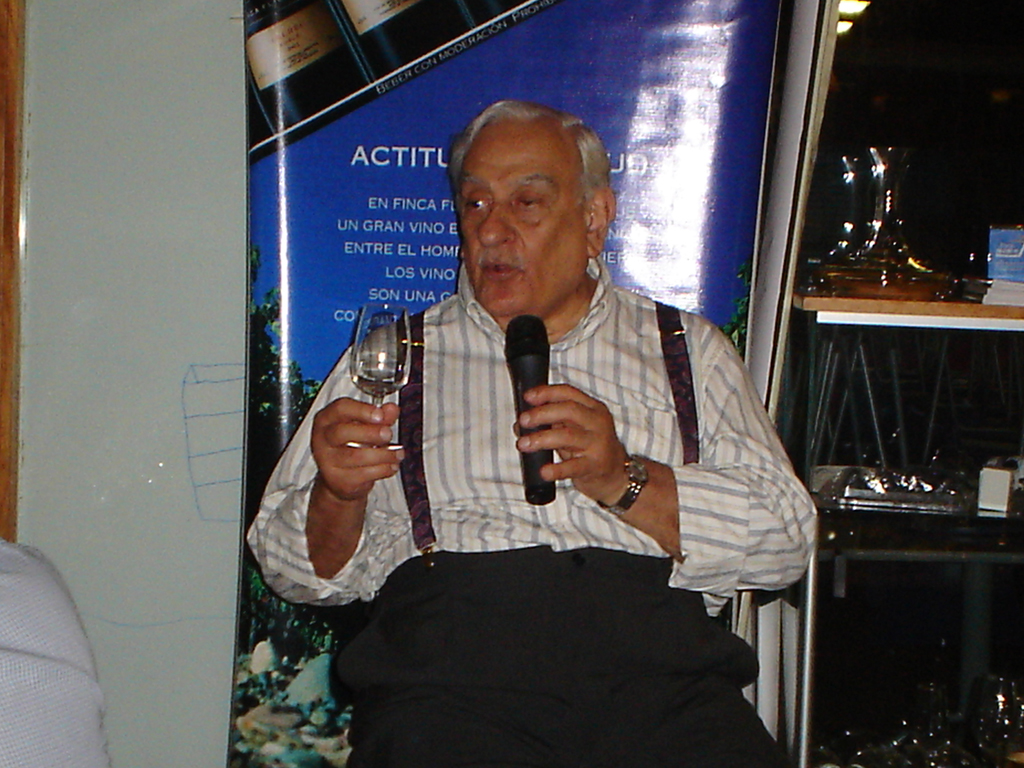
Brascó in 2008

Miguel Brascó (14 September 1926 – 10 May 2014) was an Argentine writer, poet and translator, humorist, cartoonist, editor, and critic who is a specialist in wine and gourmet food. From Sastre, Santa Fe, he was also a lawyer and journalist of long standing, and a keen observer of Argentine affairs.
