= El espíritu de la música =

El espíritu de la música (Spanish: The spirit of music) is an 1832 Argentine book by Juan Bautista Alberdi. It is the first work of the author, who wrote it during his studies.
