= Fragmento preliminar al estudio del derecho =

Fragmento preliminar al estudio del derecho (Spanish: Preliminary fragment of the study of law) is an 1837 book by Juan Bautista Alberdi. It is an analysis of the legal system of Argentina at the time.

== Bibliography ==
- Luqui-Lagleyze, Julio Mario (2010). Grandes biografías de los 200 años: Juan Bautista Alberdi. Argentina: Clarín. ISBN 978-987-07-0842-1.
