= Libreria Argentina =

Bookstore in Buenos Aires, Argentina

Libreria Argentina, also called Libros del Tercer Reich, was a bookstore and publishing house in the San Isidro district of Buenos Aires, Argentina.

The Argentine Federal Police (PFA) raided and closed the bookstore on September 13, 2023, after an investigation by Argentina's Jewish umbrella group Delegación de Asociaciones Israelitas Argentinas revealed the store's sale of Nazi propaganda, a crime in Argentina, and antisemitic content. Libreria Argentina offered more than 500 titles and videos.

Authorities arrested Pablo Giorgetti, the bookstore's proprietor. He was previously the subject of a 2011 complaint by the Simon Wiesenthal Center. Police also seized 230 books, which the PFA called a "historic seizure" of Nazi paraphernalia in Argentina.

== See also ==
- Antisemitism in Argentina
