= Memoria descriptiva sobre Tucumán =

Memoria descriptiva sobre Tucumán (Spanish: Descriptive memoir of Tucumán) is an Argentine 1834 book of Juan Bautista Alberdi. It was a work requested by Alejandro Heredia, governor of the Tucumán Province.

== Bibliography ==
- Lojo, María Rosa (2009). El pensamiento de Juan Bautista Alberdi [The thought of Juan Bautista Alberdi]. Argentina: El Ateneo. p. 9. ISBN 978-950-02-0478-1.
