= Landeta =

Landeta is a surname. Notable people with the surname include:

- Ane Inés Landeta (born 1996), Basque actress and visual artist
- Imanol Landeta (born 1987), Mexican singer and actor
- Ioritz Landeta (born 1995), Spanish professional footballer
- Matilde Landeta (1913–1999), Mexican filmmaker and screenwriter
- Manuel Landeta (born 1958), Mexican singer and actor
- Sean Landeta (born 1962), American professional football player
