= Antisemitism in Argentina =

Antisemitism is hostility toward or discrimination against Jews as a religious, ethnic, or racial group. In Argentina antisemitism has been around since Spanish colonization in the sixteenth century, and has continued to the present day. In the twentieth century, antisemitism was particularly pervasive in Argentina, especially in the World War II and post-World War II eras.

== History ==
=== Early Twentieth Century ===
Mass immigration in the late nineteenth century brought a substantial number of Germans and Jews to Argentina. This mass immigration, in-turn, spawned a nativist, nationalistic fervor, which, in combination with the growth of Nazism amongst German Argentines, spawned measures against Jews. In 1902 Argentina passed a Residency Law limiting the number of Jewish immigrants, and newspapers like La Nacion incorporated anti-Semitic rhetoric into their stories. Similarly, in German Argentine communities propaganda against non-German Jews circulated in their newspapers, and visits by Jews, like Albert Einstein, were rejected. In 1919 violent repression against Jews was used in the famous Argentine event known as Tragic Week. During Tragic Week the Argentine police force went into Jewish neighborhoods, dragged Jews from their homes into the streets, and beat, shot, and killed them for supposedly spreading subversive ideas like communism and socialism. The outrage began in December 1918, workers in a metallurgic factory in Buenos Aires went on strike. The workers demanded their work day be reduced from 11 to 8 hours, higher wages, a six-day work week, and the rehiring of workers who were fired during the strike (Mirelman 61). After a month of striking, on January 7, 1919, strikebreakers were led to the facility in order to work. Fighting ultimately broke out between the strikers, strikebreakers, and police officers. The officers killed and wounded several workers. At the funeral the following day, more violence commenced, and led to a general strike in Argentina. The strikes and violence frightened the upper class, who controlled the police and army, who saw the strikes as the culmination of the rise of foreign, maximalist ideas. The elites blamed the disturbances in the working class on Russian immigrants, all of whom they considered Jewish. It was thought at the time that the Russian revolution had affected the mental health of Russians and that Russians were spreading their lunacy to Argentina (Mirelman 64). Although there is no evidence to support this theory, it was thought that Jews devised the plan for the strike back Russia and came to Argentina to spread communist and Bolshevist ideas. Once the general strikes commenced, the elite, as well as a civilian group called the Guardica Blanca (White Guard) began attacking foreigners (Mirelman 62). The Chase of the Russians began, where many used the slogan, “‘Death to the Jews’” (Mirelman 62). As the attacks went on, the Jewish neighborhoods took hits. Attackers burned their books and furniture, and accused Jews of making communist propaganda (Mirelman 63). Jews were violently attacked by gangs, women were forced to eat their own excrement, and “‘Poor girls of fourteen or fifteen... [were] raped’” (Mirelman 63). Once agreements were made to end the strikes, the violence stopped in Jewish neighborhoods.

=== The 1930s ===
In the 1930s, antisemitism in Argentina became a prominent ideology amongst all groups, no longer only dominant amongst the elite, and turned markedly more Argentinian. The military coup in 1930 played a part in this change; for it began a half-century period of mostly military fascist dictatorships in Argentina, and brought to power general José Félix Uriburu. Uriburu, who trained in the German military in 1908, and was named the director of the Center of German influence in the Argentine army in 1910, subsequently restored German military presence in the army, and filled his government with nacionalistas: extreme-right ideologues involved in Jewish pogroms in the post World War II era.

Alongside Uriburu, on April 7, 1931 the Argentine Country-Group (ACG) of the German Socialist Workers' Party (NSDAP) was formed. Later in 1931 the ACG featured the swastika in newspapers, gave the Hitler salute at publicly advertised rallies, and were reported by Argentine authorities for assaulting suspected Jews. Thus, in the 1930s Nazism had arrived in Argentina.

The antisemitic rhetoric posed by the Catholic Church also pervaded Argentine society. For priests Gustavo Franceschi, director of the Catholic journal Criterio, and Leonardo Castellani, pogroms were no longer unimaginable solutions. Explaining why pogroms might be necessary, Father Julio Meinville in his 1936 book El Judio reasoned that Jews, whom he equated to the antichrist, were promoting sin in God's society, which he equated to Catholic Argentinians' society; thus requiring action. Father Virgilio Fillipo in radio transmissions, articles in Clarinada, and pamphlets distilled Jews to the physical stereotype of big, hooked noses and wavy hair. These figures similarly interpreted "Jewish societal control" propaganda as not only radical greed, but principally as an attack on morality and family structure, the pillars of religion. Thus, to the church, Jews sought to attack the family structure by promoting subversive ideas like Marxism and Freudianism, and sought to erode morality by promoting sexual promiscuity. The charge of sexual promiscuity would gain further intensity in 1930, when members of the Jewish gang Zwi Migdal were arrested, and consequently publicized, for bringing prostitutes from Europe into Argentine society. In line with their Catholic beliefs, priests also depicted Jews as heretics responsible for killing Jesus Christ.

=== Under Juan Domingo Perón ===
Perón himself, as evidenced by internal memoranda from the beginning of his reign, subscribed to antisemitic rhetoric contextualizing Jews in accordance to the societal domination theory propagated by secular antisemites. He also emboldened the Catholic Church by making Catholicism required teaching in all schools. But Perón never allowed antisemitic rhetoric to evolve further, denying requests for extreme measures within his administration such as concentration camps. This external repudiation, however, was met with strong antisemitic internal measures, which has sparked historical debate over the antisemitic legacy of Perón and Peronism.

Prior to Perón's administration, Argentine Foreign Minister Jose Cantilo issued a directive to all Argentine foreign ministers around the world barring any Jewish immigration to Argentina. This directive, known as Directive Eleven, was not only continued under Perón's administration, but intensified during the time Hitler's final solution was taking place. For example, Nazi Foreign Minister Joachim Van Ribbentrop, who was part of the team responsible for expelling all Jews from German territory, identified one-hundred Argentine Jews in German territory, and contacted Argentine ambassadors and ministers for their repatriation to Argentina, seeking to protect them from Hitler's final solution. The Perón administration at first ignored Ribbentrop's offer, and after answering, delayed action until after the war was over. Moreover, appointed as head of Immigration under Perón, and subsequently in charge of enforcing Directive Eleven, was Santiago Peralta, an Argentine Nazi. While in office Peralta published two books detailing his views: the first book, entitled The Action of the Jewish People in Argentina (1943), furthered the "societal domination" narrative; and in his second book, The Influence of the Arab People in Argentina, Peralta likened the Jewish relationship to society as to that of cysts in the human body.

When Perón was elected as President in 1946 he reinstated Peralta as the head of Immigration, over public outcry for Peralta's resignation, and shortly thereafter Jewish immigration conflict ensued. In one such episode, known as the Jamaica Affair of 1946, the S.S. Jamaica docked in Argentina with seventy Jewish passengers. Upon learning of the S.S. Jamaica's passengers Peralta refused to let them ashore. The Jewish community, outraged, appealed directly to Perón, who claimed to look into the situation but in-actuality did nothing, resulting in the Jamaica's departure with the passengers onboard. A year later a similar situation occurred with the S.S. Campana. This time however, Perón let the Jews ashore over Peralta's objections. Notably though, it is argued that Perón's actions were more than likely politically motivated than altruistic, for when the Jews aboard the Campana went to thank Perón personally he was absent from his office, and a week later he formed the Argentine-Israelite Organization, which divided the Jewish community by granting special privileges to those part of the organization—i.e. those willing to pledge their loyalty to Perón.

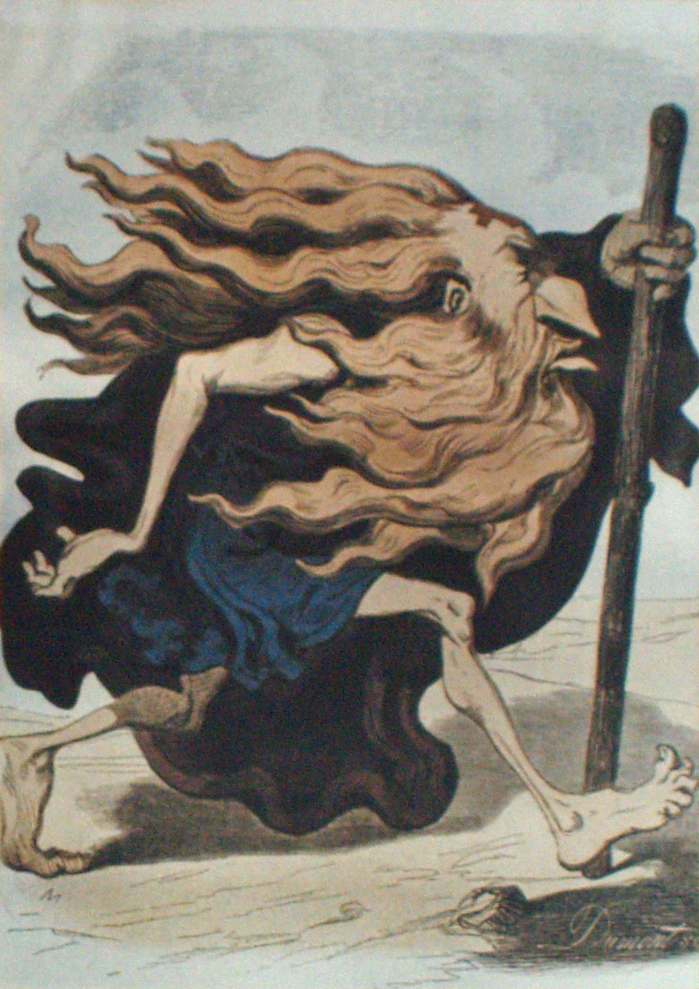
An example of the antisemitic depiction proposed by men like father Virgilio Filipo.

Also part of Perón's record is his embrace of Nazi Germany and Nazis during and after World War II. According to SD Chief Walter Schellenberg in an interrogation by Americans after World War II, once Perón assumed power an agreement was quickly brokered that granted Nazis passage to Argentina free from arrest or punishment, and inclusion in the Argentine Secret Service, in exchange for Nazi resources. While in exile in Spain, Perón seemingly verified Schellenberg's story, explaining in cassette recordings that were eventually transcribed how and why he helped Nazis escape to Argentina. According to Perón, the Nuremberg trials violated military honor, and thus were disgraceful, for the Allies acted as if they had lost despite being victorious. So together with his personal aide Rodolfo Freude—whose father was considered one of the ten richest men in Latin America, was a Nazi, and a large, possibly the largest, donor to Perón—and Santiago Peralta, his Nazi head of Immigration, he sought to rescue as many convicted war criminals and Nazi collaborators as possible. From 1946 to 1947 thirteen such people were flown from Madrid to Argentina, many of whom were granted positions in his government or in the military.

=== After Perón ===
Flag of the Tacuara Nationalist Movement

After Perón was deposed in 1955 a pair of antisemitic paramilitary groups flourished in the regimes that came after. One of these groups, the Tacuara, viewed themselves as heirs to the fascism of interwar Germany. As such, Tacuara members sought to emulate their heirs by continuing their extermination of the Jews: bombing and gunning buildings with Jews inside, executing Jewish university students, and engaging in physical harassment of Jews, such as carving a swastika into the breast of a Jewish university student. The Tacuara also sought to imitate fascist Germany by continuing their propaganda: placing posters with the words "Jews to the Crematorium! Honor to Eichman" around Buenos Aires Many Tacuara also had links to the American Ku Klux Klan, and would later become members of the 1976 military junta. The other group, the Argentine Anticommunist Alliance (The Triple A), was an extreme right version of the Tacuara that sought organized assassinations of Jews. Many Triple A members were former Tacuara, and the group later started a magazine for their propaganda called El Caudillo, which was subsidized by Perón's and his wife's administrations in the 1970s.

=== The Military Junta of 1976-1983 ===
From 1976 to 1983 the military junta in-charge engaged in what is referred to as the "dirty war" against its own citizens, in which between ten-thousand to thirty-thousand Argentines were kidnapped, tortured, and killed—or "disappeared" according to the government. For the purposes of eradicating Argentina's "internal enemies", the junta established concentration camps for all enemies of the state, mostly consisting of non-Jews but also including hundreds to thousands of Jews. Although it appears that Jews were not specifically targeted by the state, testimony from concentration camp survivors indicates that Jews received Nazi-like treatment upon revealing their identities. Some were forced to mime dogs or cats by crawling on their hands and knees and licking the bottom of officers' boots. And some had swastikas carved into their bodies, were used as practice for martial arts moves, forced to salute Hitler, forced to listen to recordings of Hitler's voice, to insult themselves for being Jewish, received spray painted swastikas on their backs and Hitler mustaches on their face, were told they would be turned into soap, or had tubes lodged into orifices so live rats could be scurried into their bodies.

Argentina does not officially recognise the victims as dead.

=== After the Junta ===
With the restoration of democracy following the military junta's end in 1983, antisemitism in Argentina did not disappear, but its pervasiveness decreased. It is believed by the United Nations that three organized neo-Nazi groups are active in Argentina, however, these groups are relatively uninfluential politically and include less than 300 members between the three groups.

In March 1992 a group called the Islamic Jihad Organization carried out a suicide bombing attack on the building of the Israeli embassy in Buenos Aires, the 1992 attack on Israeli embassy in Buenos Aires, which killed 29 civilians. Among the dead there were two Israeli women who were the wives of the embassy's consul and first secretary.

In July 1994 there was a suicide van bomb attack on the Asociación Mutual Israelita Argentina (AMIA; Argentine Israelite Mutual Association) building in Buenos Aires known as the AMIA bombing. The bombing killed 85 people and left hundreds injured. The Argentine government has accused Iran and Hezbollah of carrying out the attack.

In 2009, following public outcry concerning Catholic bishop Richard Williamson, who made statements denying the Holocaust, the Argentinian government expelled Williamson from Argentina. The official reason cited by immigration authorities was a visa technicality.

In late 2018, a throng of soccer fans chanted the antisemitic slogan "killing Jews to make soap," (referencing the actions of Nazi Germany producing soap made from human corpses). The fans went on to damage property and police were called to ensure the safety of the players and other spectators. The incident was sparked by the outcome of the soccer match in which one team with Jewish roots won the match.

=== 2022 to present ===
Annual antisemitic Incidents 2022-2024
2022	2023	2024	2025
427	598	679	713

In 2023, Argentina witnessed a significant rise in reported antisemitic incidents, with a 44% increase, mostly after October 7. According to Delegación de Asociaciones Israelitas Argentinas (DAIA), the country's Jewish umbrella organization, the majority of antisemitic incidents that year occurred in the three months following the Hamas attack. While a large number of incidents took place online, in-person antisemitic acts also surged, with the DAIA report highlighting graffiti such as “Hamas” and crossed-out Stars of David on school property.

The rise in antisemitic incidents is reflected in data from the DAIA, which recorded 598 incidents in 2023 and 679 in 2024, compared to 427 incidents reported in 2022.

In August 2026, an Argentine judge was removed for his antisemitic posts, in what is believed to be the first such removal in the country’s history. A panel ruled that Alfredo Eugenio López’s social media posts, in which he referred to the Jewish people as “a brood of vipers,” and Argentinian Jews as “foreigners,” had undermined the public’s confidence in him to issue decisions impartially.

== Bibliography ==
- Feitlowitz, Marguerite (1998). A Lexicon of Terror: Argentina and the Legacies of Torture. New York: Oxford University Press. ISBN 0-19-510635-0.
- Finchelstein, Federico (2014). The Ideological Origins of the Dirty War: Fascism, Populism, and Dictatorship in Twentieth Century Argentina. New York: Oxford University Press. ISBN 978-0-19-993024-1.
- Goldwert, Marvin (1972). Democracy, Militarism, and Nationalism in Argentina, 1930-1966: An Interpretation. Austin: The University of Texas Press. ISBN 0-292-71500-5.
- Goñi, Uki (2002). The Real Odessa: Smuggling the Nazis to Peron's Argentina. New York: Granta Books. ISBN 1-86207-581-6.
- Hodges, Donald C. (1991). Argentina's "Dirty War": An Intellectual Biography. Austin: University of Texas Press. ISBN 0-292-72947-2.
- Newton, Ronald C. (1992). The 'Nazi Menace" In Argentina, 1931-1947. Stanford, California: Stanford University Press. ISBN 0-8047-1929-2.
- Romero, Luis Alberto (2002). A History of Argentina in the Twentieth Century. Translated by Brennan, James P. University Park, Pennsylvania: The Pennsylvania State University Press. ISBN 0-271-02192-6.
