= Benjamín Villafañe =

Argentinian military leader (1814–1893)

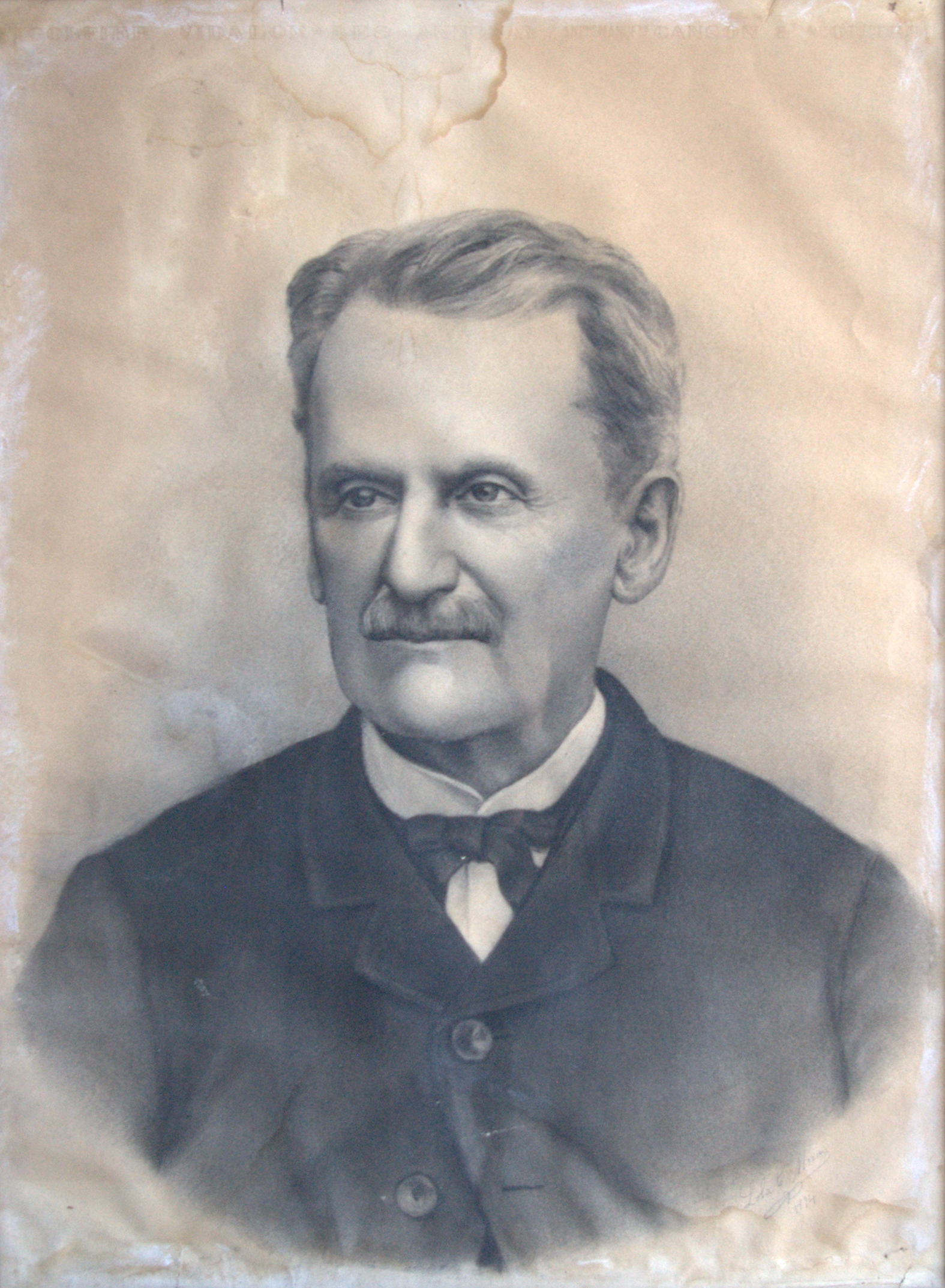
Fotografía de Benjamín Villafañe

Benjamín Villafañe (March 31, 1814 – June 6, 1893) was an Argentine military leader. Born in Tucuman, he fought against Juan Manuel de Rosas during the Argentine Civil War, and escaped to Bolivia after the death of Juan Lavalle. He returned to Buenos Aires after the defeat of Rosas in the battle of Caseros. He died in Jujuy.

== Military career ==
Villafañe was born in Tucuman as the son of José Antonio Villafañe Santa Ana and his second wife, Ana Maria Bazán Álvarez. He was educated in his hometown.

On September 13, 1837, he was one of the survivors of the battle of Santa Bárbara, in Humahuaca, between the Jujuy militias and the forces of the Peru-Bolivian Confederation commanded by Marshal Andrés de Santa Cruz.

In 1839, he joined the May Association in San Juan, where he established ties with Domingo Faustino Sarmiento (who mentions him in his autobiographical book Recuerdos de provincia), Antonino Aberastain, Cortínez, de la Rosa, Saturnino Laspiur, Manuel José Quiroga de la Rosa, and others. Upon his return to Tucumán, he formed the Tucumán branch of the Association with Marco Avellaneda and devoted himself to supporting the political actions of Minister Avellaneda and the Northern Coalition in the press. There he wrote his first public piece, “Rápida ojeada sobre la pasada época” (A Quick Glance at the Past Era), a pamphlet in which he criticized the policies of Tucumán caudillo Alejandro Heredia.

When the city of Córdoba came under the control of the Unitarians at the end of 1840, Villafañe moved there and met General Juan Lavalle. He accompanied Lavalle during the La Rioja campaign and wrote his proclamations before returning to Tucumán.
