= Bases y puntos de partida para la organización política de la República Argentina =

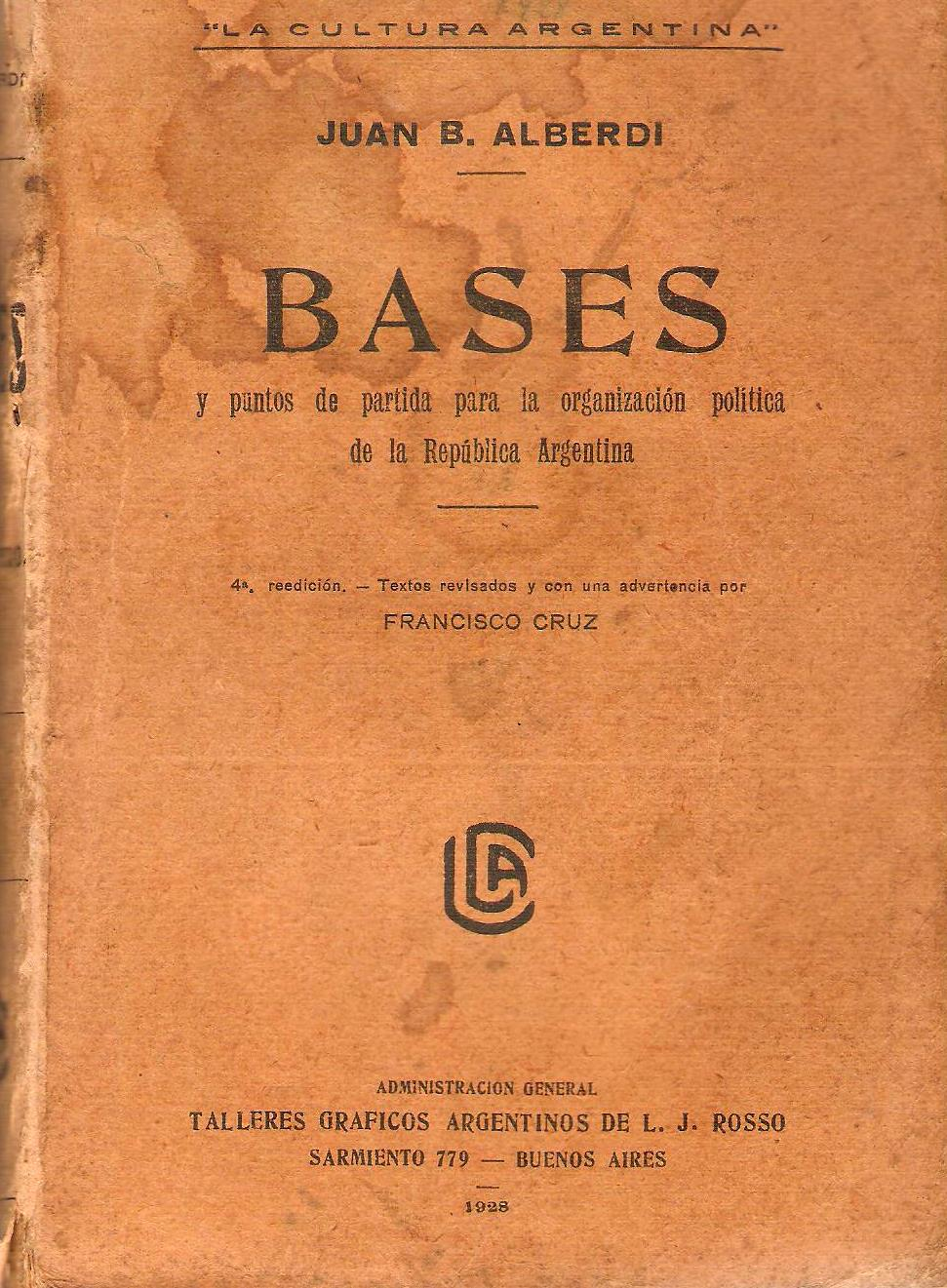

Bases y puntos de partida para la organización política de la República Argentina (English: Bases and starting points for the political organization of the Argentine republic) is an Argentine book by Juan Bautista Alberdi. Many points from it were incorporated into the Argentine Constitution of 1853.

== Creation ==
Juan Bautista Alberdi, discontent with the rule of Juan Manuel de Rosas, had moved to France, but decided to return to South America in 1843. He did not return to Argentina, as Rosas was still in power, and neither to Montevideo, which was waging the Uruguayan civil War. As a result, he moved to Chile instead.

Rosas was finally defeated by Justo José de Urquiza in 1852. Urquiza wanted the organization of the country and the promulgation of a national constitution, which Rosas denied. Alberdi stayed in Chile, to keep distance from the political turmoil caused by the fall of Rosas, and began writing the "Bases..." to propose ideas for the upcoming constitution. He supported federalism and the end of the port of Buenos Aires as the sole international customs of the whole country. When he knew about the San Nicolás Agreement he sent a copy of the Bases to Urquiza, who welcomed it. The book had an immediate political repercussion.

== Bibliography ==
- Luna, Félix (2004). Grandes protagonistas de la historia Argentina: Juan Bautista Alberdi. Buenos Aires: Grupo Editorial Planeta. ISBN 950-49-1256-7.
