= Florencio Varela (writer) =

Argentine writer, poet, journalist and educator

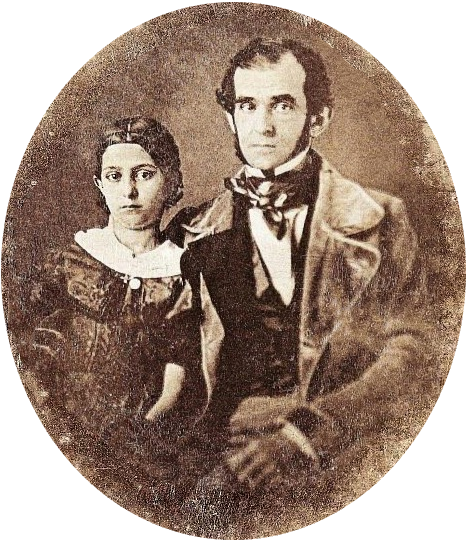
- Florencio Varela and his daughter in Montevideo, c.1847
- Born: 23 February 1808; Buenos Aires
- Died: 20 March 1848 (aged 40)
- Occupation: Writer

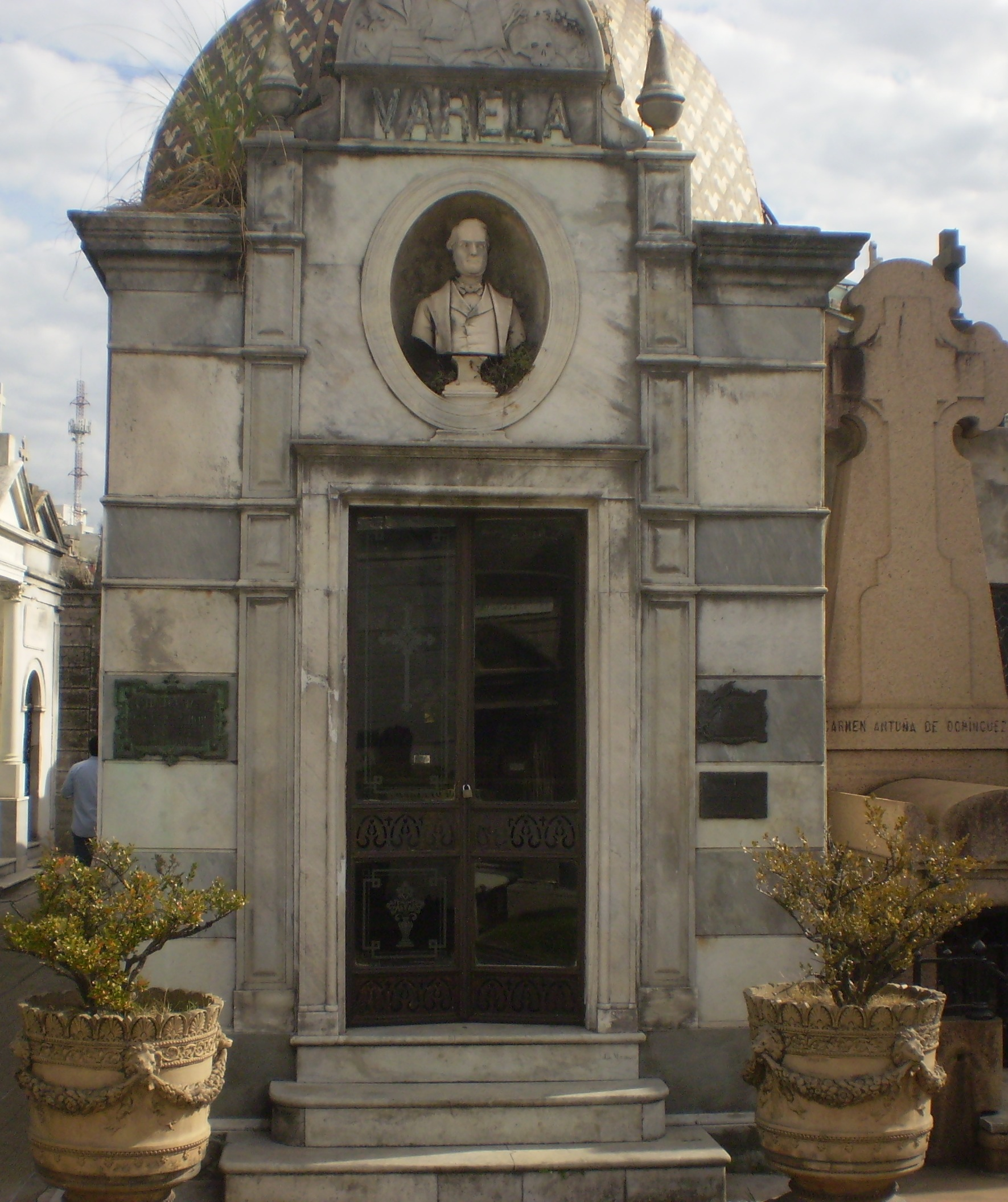
Varela's grave in La Recoleta Cemetery

Florencio Varela (23 February 1808 – 20 March 1848) was an Argentine writer, poet, journalist and educator.

Florencio was born in Buenos Aires on 23 February 1808, he was the sixth child of Don Jacobo Adrián Varela and María de la Encarnación Sanjinés, he had a keen interest in the literary arts from a young age. In his youth he wrote poetry and a theatre production.

After graduating from the University of Buenos Aires in 1827 Varela became involved in politics, his association with the Partido Unitario meant that he was exiled to Montevideo in Uruguay after the defeat of General Juan Lavalle.

Varela settled in Montevideo starting a family and associating with several other exile writers and intellectuals who opposed the rule of Governor Juan Manuel de Rosas.

After suffering a heart condition Varela moved to Rio de Janeiro in Brazil where he recovered his health and worked on his history of Argentina. In 1842 he returned to Uruguay. In 1843 he travelled to Europe in order to garner British and French support to the project of a new state comprising Uruguay, Rio Grande do Sul and some Argentine provinces. While in France, and like many other young travellers did, he met José de San Martín.

On 1 October 1845 he founded the newspaper "Comercio del Plata" in Montevideo, he also founded the biblioteca de obras originales y traducidas (library of originals and translations). He became one of the fiercest critics of Governor Rosas. On 20 March 1848 he was assassinated by Andrés Cabrera, who was acting under the orders of Manuel Oribe and Rosas. He is buried in La Recoleta Cemetery in Buenos Aires.
