= Vicente Fidel López =

Argentine historian, lawyer and politician (1815–1903)

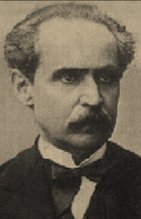
- Born: April 24, 1815; Buenos Aires, Viceroyalty of Rio de la Plata
- Died: August 30, 1903 (aged 88); Buenos Aires
- Resting place: La Recoleta Cemetery
- Relatives: Vicente López y Planes
- Writing career
- Language: Spanish
- Notable work: Historia de la República Argentina

Vicente Fidel López (April 24, 1815 in Buenos Aires – August 30, 1903) was an Argentine historian, lawyer and politician. He was the son of writer and politician Vicente López y Planes.

== Biography ==
He studied at the school of Moral Sciences with Diego Alcorta, and got a degree as lawyer in 1837. He was a founding member of the "Sociedad de estudios Históricos y Sociales" (the Society of Social and Historical Studies), the "Salón Literario" (Literary Salon) and the "Asociación de Mayo" (May Association). From 1840 to 1852 he stayed in Chile, as he opposed the government of Juan Manuel de Rosas. During this time, he worked with Domingo Faustino Sarmiento, with whom he founded a private school and published a book of Chilean History in 1845.

He returned to Argentina after the defeat of Rosas, being a minister of his father. In this time he published 2 historical novels, "La novia del hereje" and "La loca de la guardia". He left again to Montevideo publishing another pair of books. He was teacher of law, and discussed with Dalmasio Vélez Sársfield about the content and function of the civil code. Between 1876 and 1879 he was a national deputy, and minister of economy in 1891 under the presidency of Carlos Pellegrini. He was an active Freemason. He contended with Bartolomé Mitre about the book Historia de Belgrano y de la Independencia Argentina, and later wrote his most important work, Historia de la República Argentina, in 10 issues (1883–1893). He died in his home city in 1903.

== Works ==
- Revista del Río de la Plata (1871–1877, with Juan María Gutierrez)
- Historia de la república Argentina (1883–1893)
- La Gran Semana de mayo (Edición de Homenaje a la Revolución de Mayo, Editorial Universitaria de Buenos Aires, Impreso en Argentina, 3ª edición, Año 1964)

== Bibliography ==
Gelman, Jorge; Raúl Fradkin (2010). Doscientos años pensando la Revolución de Mayo. Buenos Aires: Sudamericana. p. 158. ISBN 978-950-07-3179-9.
