= Juan María Gutiérrez =

Argentine statesman, jurist, surveyor, historian, critic and poet

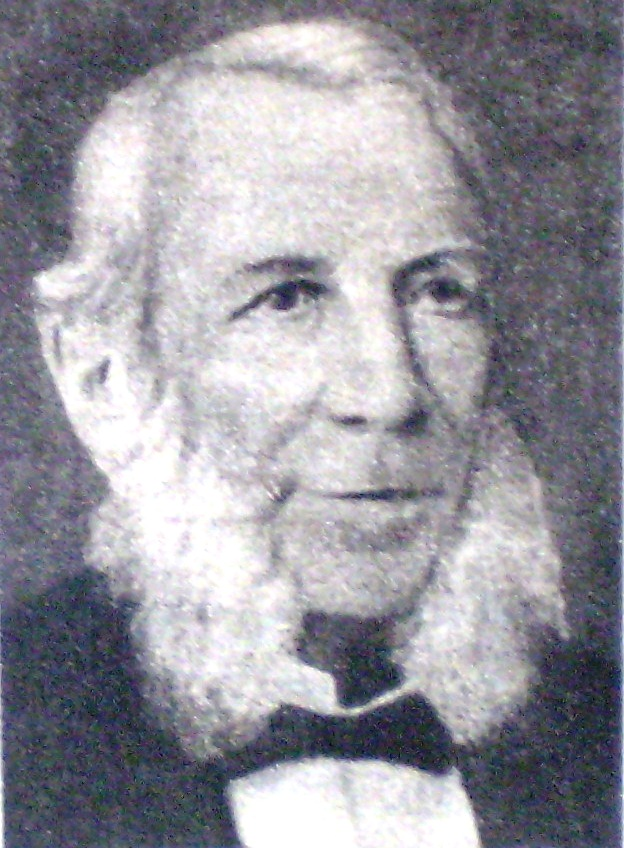
Juan María Gutiérrez

Juan María Gutiérrez (May 6, 1809 – February 26, 1878) was an Argentine statesman, jurist, surveyor, historian, critic, and poet.

He was a major figure in Argentine liberalism and one of the most prominent promoters of Argentine culture during the 19th century. His oeuvre includes novels, Costumbrist dramas, biographies, literary criticism, and scientific works.

His political career began after the fall of Juan Manuel de Rosas in 1852. He represented Entre Ríos at the Argentine constitutional convention the following year. Between 1854 and 1856 he served as minister of foreign relations for the Argentine Confederation. Along with Esteban Echeverría, he was one of the founders of the Asociación de Mayo, an intellectual movement of the Rio de la Plata region.

Gutiérrez was also a major figure of science and technology within Argentina. He was rector of the University of Buenos Aires from 1861 until his retirement in 1874. During his tenure, numerous distinguished European professors joined the university's faculty. Along with Hermann Burmeister, he launched the study of natural sciences in Argentina.

"Fortunately I have a malleable character and always find as much promise in a book of poetry as in a book of mathematics." - Juan María Gutiérrez
"By virtue of his heart's loftiness and his spirit's luster, Gutiérrez was a poet without compromising himself as a mathematician. This yields the precious alliance of good taste and good sense that pervades his intelligence." - Juan Bautista Alberdi

== Biography ==
Gutiérrez was acquainted with letters from an early age, but did not disdain the sciences, and was especially fond of mathematics. He studied engineering as much as he did law. He earned his doctorate in jurisprudence at age 27 with the thesis Sobre los tres poderes públicos ("On the three public powers"). He was exempt from paying tuition due to his family's poor economic standing, but chose to pay his own way as a surveyor and engineer with the Topographical Department, by producing translations, and by contributing to literary journals.

He formed and presided over the Association of Historical Studies and regularly attended meetings of the Literary Salon founded by Marcos Sastre. In 1837 he delivered his lecture Physiognomy of Spanish learning.

During the rule of Juan Manuel de Rosas, Gutiérrez's support for Argentine exiles in Montevideo led to his dismissal and imprisonment. He himself moved to Uruguay in 1840 when it was discovered that he had collaborated anonymously to El Iniciador, a periodical critical of Rosas. At the same time he continued to produce works as an engineer and topographer. Along with Juan Bautista Alberdi and Esteban Echeverría, he founded the Asociación de Mayo. In 1843 he and Alberdi traveled through the Americas and Europe. During a sojourn in Valparaíso, Chile, Gutiérrez devoted himself to teaching and writing. Among his works from this period was the critically acclaimed América Poética. He became the first director of the Naval Academy in Valparaíso. He published biographies translated from the French, as well as the results of his investigations of the new world.

The fall of Rosas in 1852 allowed Gutiérrez to return to Argentina, where he attended the Constitutional Convention of 1853 as a supporter of the San Nicolás Agreement. As minister of foreign relations of the Argentine Confederation under Justo José de Urquiza, he contributed to the success of the San José de Flores Agreement in 1859, which reunited Buenos Aires and the provinces of the Argentine Confederation.

Gutiérrez began a career as a journalist in Buenos Aires and also served as a national deputy. President Bartolomé Mitre appointed him rector of the University of Buenos Aires, in which capacity he served from 1861 to 1874.; he established the university's School of Engineering in 1866. He later attended the Constitutional Convention of Buenos Aires between 1870 and 1873.
