= Esteban Echeverría =

Argentine poet and writer

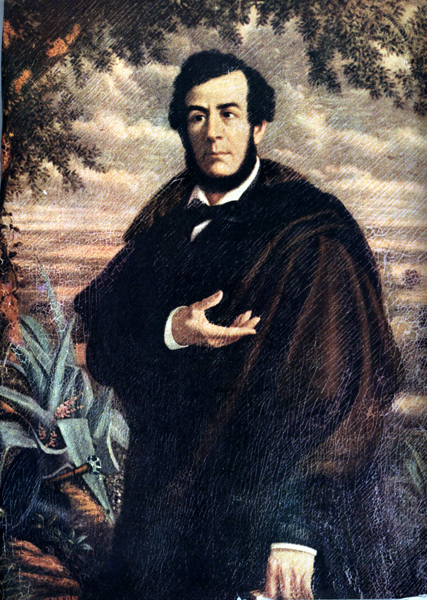
- Portrait of Esteban Echeverría.
- Born: 2 September 1805; Buenos Aires
- Died: 19 January 1851 (aged 45); Montevideo
- Education: Sorbonne
- Writing career
- Language: Spanish language
- Notable works: El Matadero, La Cautiva
- Movement: Romanticism

José Esteban Antonio Echeverría (2 September 1805 – 19 January 1851) was an Argentine poet, fiction writer, cultural promoter, and liberal activist who played a significant role in the development of Argentine literature, not only through his own writings but also through his organizational efforts. He was one of Latin America's most important Romantic authors. Echeverría's romantic liberalism was influenced by both the democratic nationalism of Giuseppe Mazzini and the utopian socialist doctrines of Henri de Saint-Simon.

== Life ==
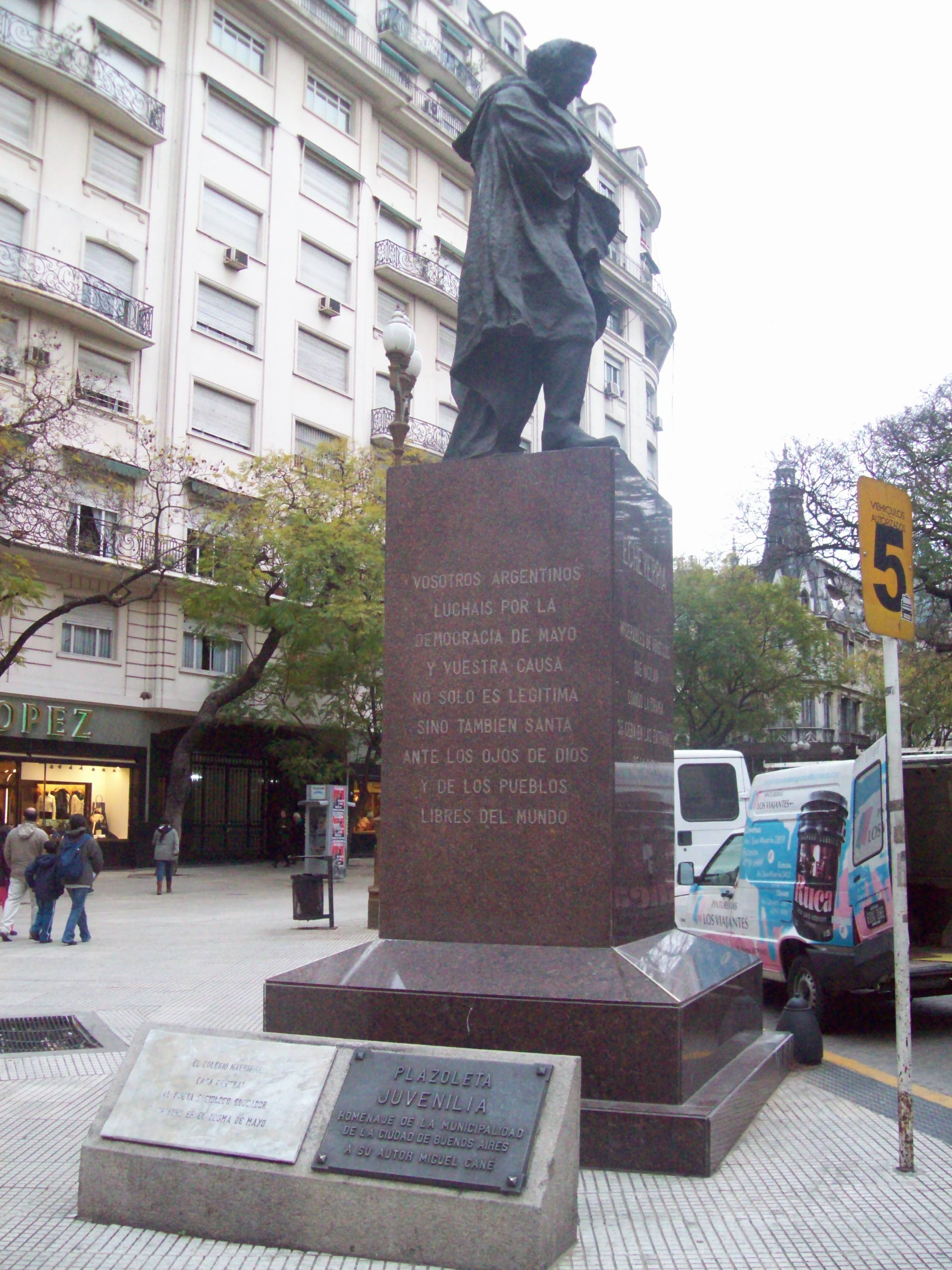
A statue in Buenos Aires honoring Esteban Echeverría remembers his words: "You Argentines fight for the May Democracy and your cause is not only legitimate but also holy in the eyes of God and the free nations of the world" (Vosotros argentinos lucháis por la democracia de Mayo y vuestra causa no sólo es legítima sino también santa ante los ojos de Dios y de los pueblos libres del mundo). On the other side it says "Slaves, or men subdued to an absolute power, have no homeland, because homeland is not connected to the place of birth, but in the free exercise of civic rights." (Los esclavos, o los hombres sometidos al poder absoluto, no tienen patria, porque la patria no se vincula a la tierra natal, sino en el libre ejercicio de los derechos ciudadanos.)

Echeverría spent five decisive years in Paris (1825 to 1830), where he absorbed the spirit of the Romantic Movement, then in its heyday in France. He became one of the movement's promoters once he returned to Argentina. Once he returned to Buenos Aires, he wrote "Los Consuelos" in 1834 and "Las rimas" in 1837. He was a member of the group of young Argentine intellectuals who in 1840 organized the Asociación de Mayo ("May Association", after the May Revolution that initiated Argentina's move towards independence). This institution aspired to develop a national literature responsive to the country's social and physical reality. Echeverría also devoted himself to the overthrow of the caudillo of Buenos Aires, Juan Manuel de Rosas. In 1840 he was forced to go into exile in nearby Uruguay, where he wrote La Insurrección del Sur and El Matadero.

He remained in Uruguay until his death in 1851. His remains are said to be buried at Buceo Cemetery.

== Work ==
Echeverría's renown as a writer rests largely on his powerful short story El matadero ("The Slaughter Yard", often mistranslated as "The Slaughterhouse"), written in sometime during 1838-1840 but not published until 1871), a landmark in the history of Latin American literature. It is mostly significant because it displays the perceived clash between "civilization and barbarism", that is, between the European and the "primitive and violent" American ways. Domingo Faustino Sarmiento, another great Argentine writer and thinker, saw this clash as the core of Latin American culture. Read in this light, "The Slaughter Yard" is a political allegory. Its more specific intention was to accuse Rosas of protecting the kind of thugs who murder the cultivated young protagonist at the Buenos Aires slaughterhouse. Rosas and his henchmen stand for barbarism, the slain young man for civilization.

Echeverría's La cautiva ("The Captive"), a long narrative poem about a white woman abducted by Mapuche Indians, is also among the better-known works of 19th-century Latin American literature.

== Esteban Echeverría Partido ==
- Esteban Echeverría Partido is a district in Gran Buenos Aires, Argentina. It was founded on April 9, 1913 and named in honor of Echeverría.

== Works ==
- Elvira o la novia del Plata (1832)
- Don Juan (1833)
- Carlos
- Mangora
- La Pola o el amor y el patriotismo
- Himno del dolor (1834)
- Los consuelos (1834)
- Al corazón (1835)
- Rimas (1837, en GB)
- La cautiva
- El matadero (between 1838 y 1840)
- Canciones
- Peregrinaje de Gualpo
- El Dogma Socialista
- Cartas a un amigo
- El ángel caído
- Ilusiones
- La guitarra
- Avellaneda
- Mefistófeles
- Apología del matambre (1837)
- La noche
- La diamela
