= Arana–Southern Treaty =

1850 peace treaty and trade agreement between the United Kingdom and Argentina

Arana-Southern Treaty
Convention for the perfect restoration of friendly relations between the Argentine Confederation and Her Britannic Majesty
- Drafted: 1849
- Signed: 24 November 1849
- Ratified: 15 May 1850
- Negotiators: Felipe Arana; Henry Southern
- Signatories: Argentine Confederation; United Kingdom of Great Britain and Ireland

Full text
- 1850 Convention of Settlement at Wikisource

The Arana–Southern Treaty (Spanish: Tratado Arana-Southern) or Convention of Settlement, formally known as the Convention for the perfect restoration of friendly relations between the Argentine Confederation and Her Britannic Majesty, was a peace treaty signed between the United Kingdom of Great Britain and Ireland and the Argentine Confederation following the Anglo-French blockade of the Río de la Plata.

In the late 1840s, the Argentine Confederation attempted to regulate traffic on the Paraná and Uruguay rivers, which impacted upon Anglo-French trade with the landlocked Paraguay. As a result, the United Kingdom and France took military action, blockading the Río de la Plata. Although militarily successful, the victories against Argentine forces proved somewhat pyrrhic, leading to the withdraw of both countries' militaries and the signing of treaties with Argentina.

== Background ==
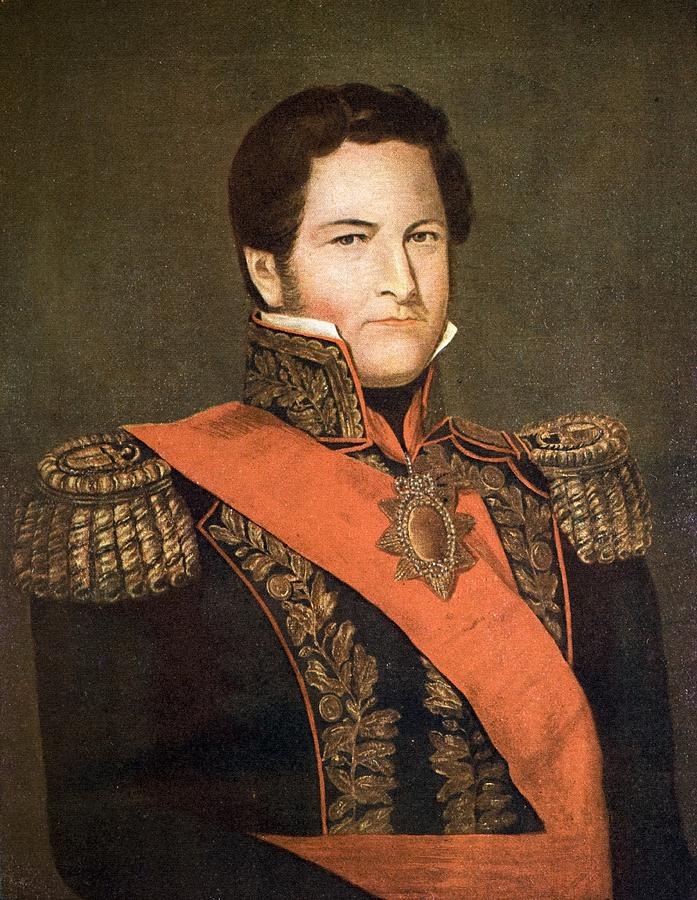
An 1841 portrait of Juan Manuel de Rosas by Cayetano Descalzi.

France and Britain imposed a five-year-long naval blockade on the Argentine Confederation ruled by Juan Manuel de Rosas. It was imposed in 1845 to support the Colorado Party in the Uruguayan Civil War, and closed Buenos Aires to naval commerce. Anglo-French merchantmen trespassed into the internal waters of Argentina in order to sell their products, as Rosas maintained a firm protectionist policy.

A key engagement in the blockade was the Battle of Vuelta de Obligado, where a combined British and French fleet forced their way into the Paraná River despite fierce resistance from the Argentine forces: although the British and French forces routed the Argentine forces, inflicting significant casualties, the damage to European fleet was so extensive that they had to stay for 40 days in Obligado to make repairs. The expedition also proved a commercial failure, as Paraguay proved to be less wealthy than expected and merchant ships were forced to return with many of their goods unsold. On their return the convoy again faced fierce resistance, with several merchant ships sunk by the cannon fire of the Argentine forces.

Whilst the British commander William Ouseley requested additional forces to support a new and continued campaign, a number of factors compelled the British to break with their French allies; the outcome of the expedition, and the total cost of the short victory and limited commercial opportunities quickly changed British attitudes. Besides, Argentina owed a substantial debt to Barings Bank and the country's suspension of payments due to the blockade had caused financial concerns for the British. The Times had also printed an allegation that Ouseley had a personal financial interest in the blockade, causing a political scandal. Tomás Samuel Hood was sent to Buenos Aires with the instruction to negotiate a settlement with Rosas at all costs.

== Negotiations ==
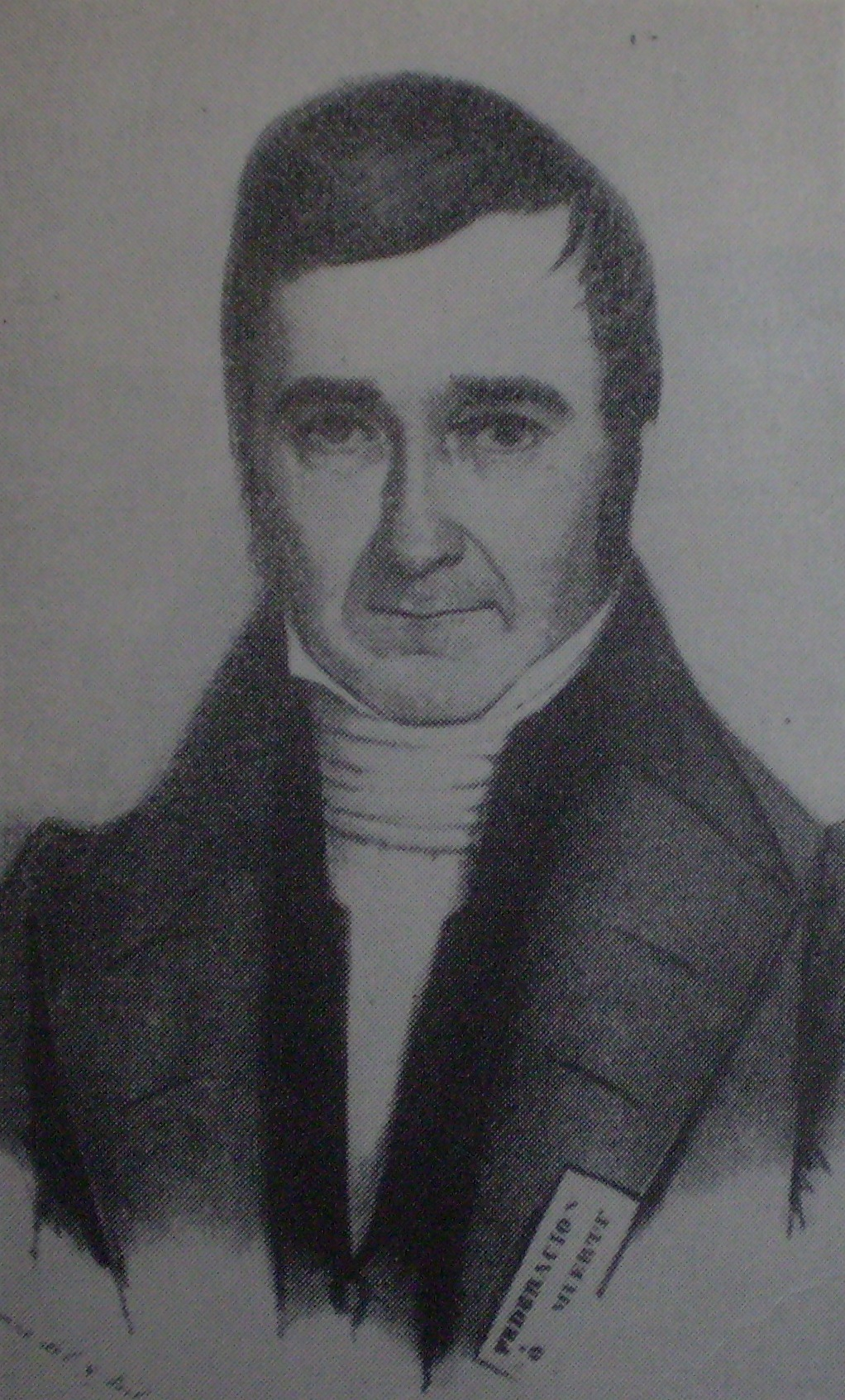
Felipe Arana

Although the Anglo-French force defeated Argentine forces, the cost of victory proved excessive in light of the military acumen displayed by the Argentines. As a result, the British sought to exit from the confrontation.

Negotiations to end the conflict took nearly two years from 1848 to 1849. The final result was the Arana–Southern Treaty. It is viewed as a considerable triumph for Rosas, as it was the first time that one of the emerging South American nations were able to impose their will on two European powers (Britain and France).

However, Rosas—as he had previously considered over the country's debt to Barings Bank—was also prepared to concede Argentina's claim to the Falkland Islands in the Convention, which would be a major point of contention and even military conflict during the next century. The treaty settled "the existing differences" between the two nations.

== Ratification ==
The Convention was signed on 24 November 1849 and ratified on 15 May 1850. The treaty came into force after ratification. Details of the Arana–Southern Treaty were published by the Foreign and Commonwealth Office, volume 37.

== Urquiza's navigation agreement ==
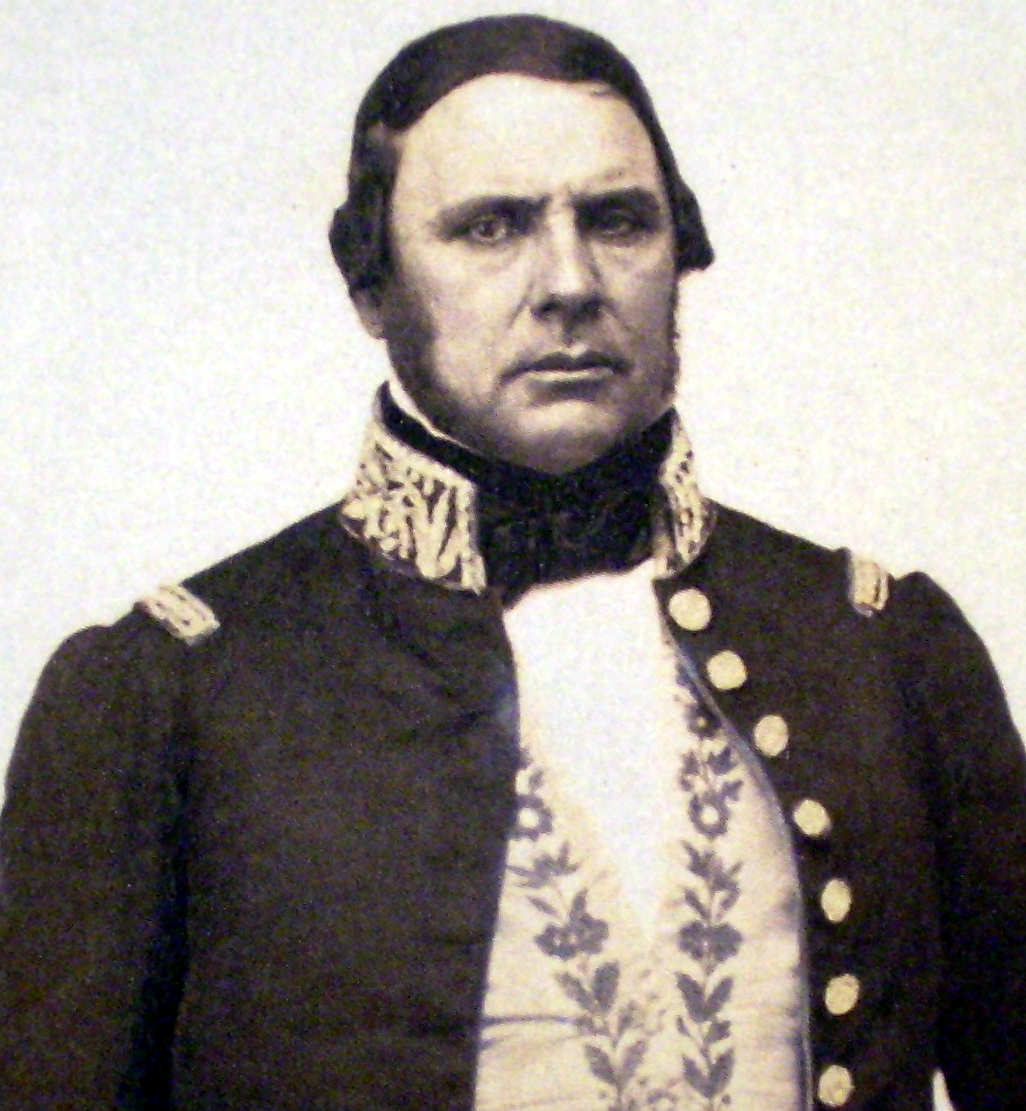
Justo José de Urquiza

The Anglo-French blockade of the Río de la Plata was followed by a rebellion of Justo José de Urquiza against Rosas. In February 1852 Urquiza defeated Rosas at the Battle of Caseros and replaced him. Shortly after Urquiza's victory, Sir Charles Hotham, who took part in the early conflict, wrote to the Earl of Malmesbury (who had replaced Lord Palmerston) suggesting that it was time to consider breaking the Arana-Southern treaty and allow the free navigation of the Argentine rivers.

Urquiza held two interviews with the British representative Robert Gore, and in the second one he expressed his "plans to develop the resources of this great and rich country; the opening of the rivers to all nations, being the ships free to sail rivers and lift or drop cargo without having to stop previously in Buenos Aires." The British focused their diplomatic efforts on obtaining a navigation agreement opening up the rivers for navigation. The Foreign Office contacted France for this end, and both countries sent a diplomatic mission to Argentina in May 1852, led by Sir Charles Hotham and Michel de Saint-Georges, to put an end to the restrictions of the Arana–Southern Treaty and Arana-Lepredour Treaty. They had an interview with Urquiza in August, who agreed with their proposals.

During a lull in the siege and blockade of Buenos Aires, between 10 and 13 July 1853, Urquiza signed navigation agreements with agents of Great Britain, France and the United States which guaranteed the free navigation of Argentine inland rivers for foreign trade. In the opinion of James Scobie, his intention was to obtain a legal instrument to force these governments to protect freedom of navigation in the event that the province of Buenos Aires tried to cut the Confederate communications with the outside. The free navigation of the rivers was included in the Constitution of Argentina of 1853.

== Relation to the Falkland Islands dispute ==
It has been asserted that "Between the re-establishment of British rule on the Falkland Islands in 1833 and the ratification of the treaty, Argentina sent annual protests to the British government by means of the Message to Congress, thereby maintaining Argentina's claim to the islands". Following the treaty, such protests ceased and Argentina did not protest again diplomatically until 1888. The matter was not raised again before the Argentine Congress until 1941. The British government cites this change as evidence that "there is no question over the sovereignty of the Falkland Islands".

=== Lord Palmerston's comments ===
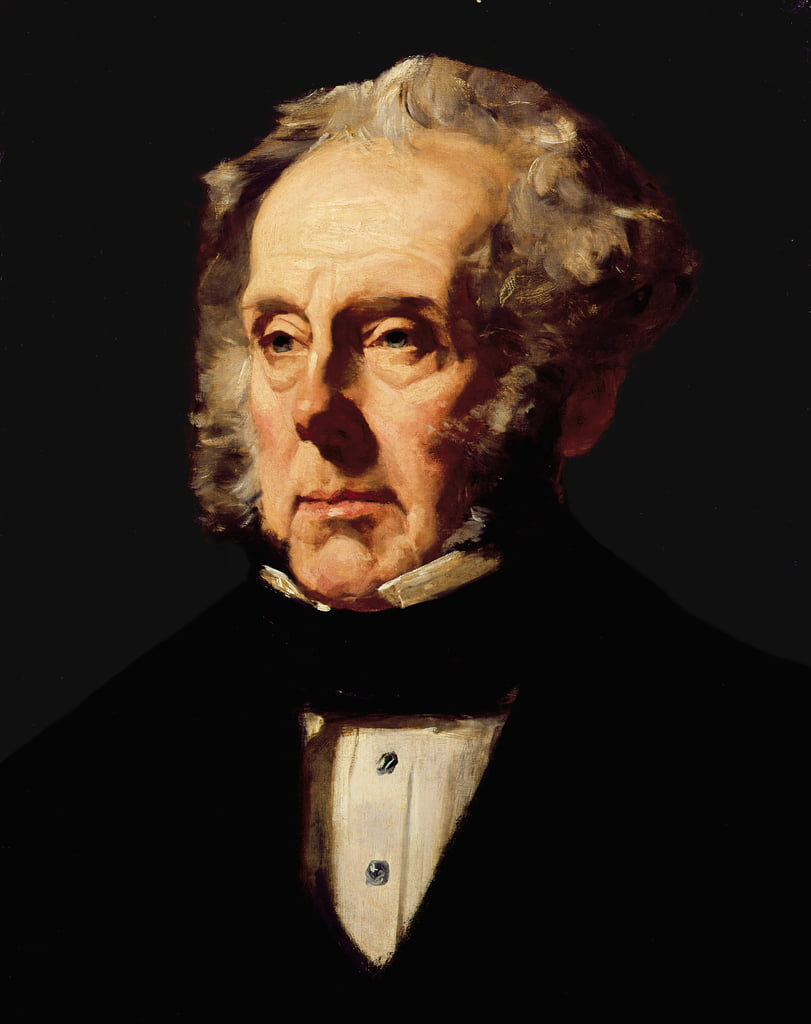
Lord Palmerston

As negotiations on the Convention of Settlement progressed, it became apparent that Argentina was prepared to acquiesce Britain's possession of the Falklands. On 27 July 1849, the British Foreign Secretary Lord Palmerston stated in the House of Commons:

... a claim had been made many years ago, on the part of Buenos Ayres, to the Falkland Islands, and had been resisted by the British Government. Great Britain had always disputed and denied the claim of Spain to the Falkland Islands, and she was not therefore willing to yield to Buenos Ayres what had been refused to Spain. 10 or 12 years ago the Falkland Islands, having been unoccupied for some time, were taken possession of by Great Britain, and a settlement had ever since been maintained there; and he thought it would be most unadvisable to revive a correspondence which had ceased by the acquiescence of one party and the maintenance of the other.

Manuel Moreno, the Argentine ambassador wrote to Lord Palmerston protesting against this statement. The Moreno letter referred to Palmerston's description of "the acquiescence of one party and the maintenance of the other" and several recent protests including the Messages to Congress. Palmerston replied, stating that "I have always understood the matter in question to stand exactly in the way described by you in your letter."

Lord Palmerston's letter is interpreted either as recognition that Argentina continued to protest or as a belief that the Falklands issue had been settled by Argentina's acquiescence.

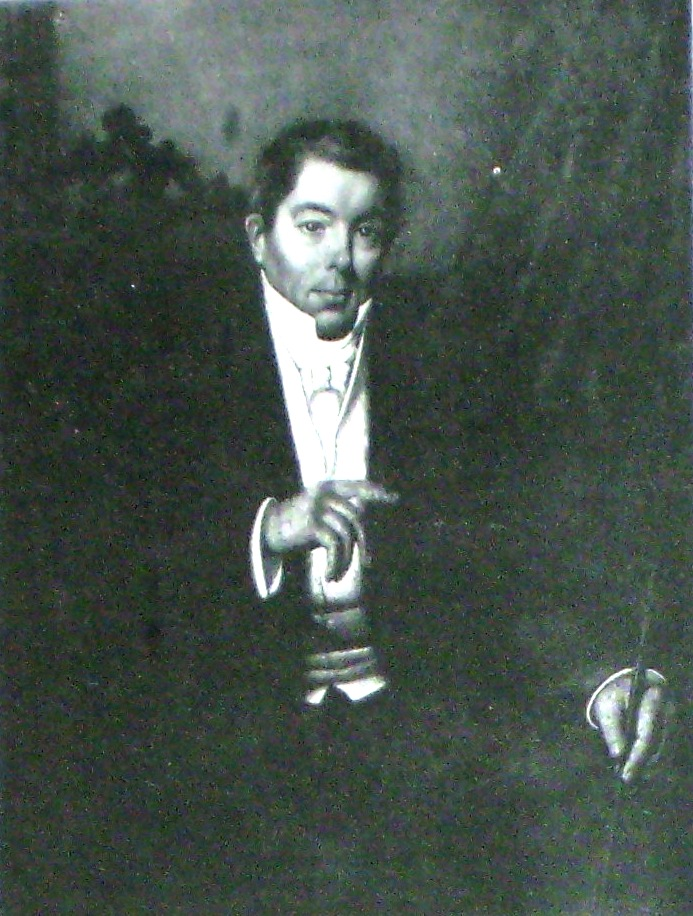
Manuel Moreno

=== Historians' opinions ===
A number of historians have commented on the relation of the Convention of Settlement to the Falklands dispute. The Mexican diplomat and historian Carlos Pereyra considers that General Rosas gave up the claim to the Falklands in order to end Britain's involvement in the River Plate blockade.

The impact of the treaty was also raised in a 1950 debate on Argentina's claim to the Falklands by a member of the Argentine Chamber of Deputies, Absalón Rojas.

Other Argentine historians have commented on the impact that the Convention of Settlement has upon Argentina's modern sovereignty claim, such as historian Alfredo R. Burnet-Merlín. Ernesto J. Fitte considers that the Argentine Confederation should have included its restitution in the treaty.

== See also ==
- Anglo-French blockade of the Río de la Plata
- Arana–Lepredour Treaty
- Falkland Islands sovereignty dispute
- List of treaties
