= Mansilla (surname) =

Mansilla is a Spanish surname.

== Geographical distribution ==
As of 2014, 62.9% of all known bearers of the surname Mansilla were residents of Argentina (frequency 1:556), 17.4% of Chile (1:828), 5.2% of Spain (1:7,357), 4.2% of Peru (1:6,175), 2.9% of Bolivia (1:2,960) and 2.7% of Guatemala (1:4,884).

In Spain, the frequency of the surname was higher than national average (1:7,357) in the following autonomous communities:

1. Extremadura (1:2,400)
2. Castilla–La Mancha (1:2,580)
3. Community of Madrid (1:4,385)
4. Melilla (1:6,351)
5. Castile and León (1:6,357)

In Argentina, the frequency of the surname was higher than national average (1:556) in the following provinces:

1. Santiago del Estero Province (1:128)
2. Santa Cruz Province (1:150)
3. Chubut Province (1:191)
4. Tierra del Fuego Province (1:253)
5. Tucumán Province (1:380)
6. Córdoba Province (1:421)
7. Santa Fe Province (1:444)
8. Río Negro Province (1:473)

In Chile, the frequency of the surname was higher than national average (1:828) in the following regions:

1. Los Lagos Region (1:68)
2. Aysén Region (1:77)
3. Magallanes Region (1:83)
4. Los Ríos Region (1:554)

== People ==
- Braian Mansilla (born 1997), Argentine footballer
- Cristopher Mansilla (1990–2021), Chilean track and road cyclist
- Eduarda Mansilla (1834–1892), Argentine writer
- Enrique Mansilla (born 1958), Argentine racing driver
- Humberto Mansilla (born 1996), Chilean athlete
- Lucio Norberto Mansilla (1789–1871), Argentine general and politician
- Lucio Victorio Mansilla (1831–1913), Argentine general and writer, son of the above
- Luis Mansilla (born 1986), Chilean track and road cyclist
- Marcelo Mansilla (born 1981), Uruguayan footballer
- Matías Mansilla (born 1996), Argentine footballer
- Miguel Mansilla (1953–2013), Uruguayan footballer
- Niusha Mansilla (born 1971), Bolivian middle and long-distance runner
- Williams Mansilla (born 1964), Minister of Defense of Guatemala

== See also ==
- Mancilla (surname)
