= Arana–Lepredour Treaty =

1850 treaty between France and Argentina

Arana-Le Prédour Treaty
- Created: 1850
- Author(s): Felipe Arana and Fortuné Joseph Hyacinthe Le Predour
- Signatories: Argentine Confederation and the French Second Republic
- Purpose: End the Anglo-French blockade of the Río de la Plata

In the late 1840s, Argentina attempted to regulate traffic on the Paraná and Uruguay rivers, which impacted upon Anglo-French trade with the landlocked Paraguay. As a result, Great Britain and France intervened militarily in the Anglo-French blockade of the Río de la Plata. Although militarily successful, the victories against Argentine forces proved somewhat pyrrhic and both withdrew forces following treaties concluded with Argentina. The peace treaty with France is referred to as the Arana–Le Prédour Treaty.

== Background ==
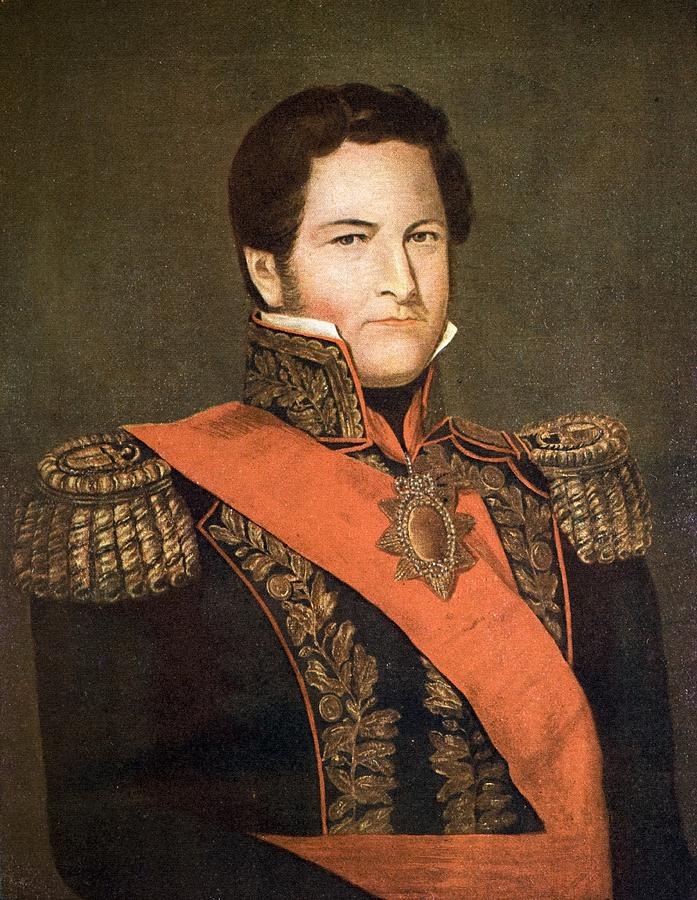
General Juan Manuel de Rosas. 1841 portrait by Cayetano Descalzi

France and Britain imposed a five-year-long naval blockade on the Argentine Confederation ruled by Juan Manuel de Rosas. It was imposed in 1845 to support the Colorado Party in the Uruguayan Civil War and closed Buenos Aires to naval commerce. The Anglo-French navy trespassed into the internal waters of Argentina, in order to sell their products, as Rosas maintained a protectionist policy.

A key engagement in the blockade was the Battle of Vuelta de Obligado, where a combined British and French fleet forced their way into the Paraná River despite fierce resistance from the Argentine forces. Although the British and French forces crushed the Argentine forces, inflicting appalling casualties, the damage to the fleet was so extensive it stayed 40 days in Obligado making repairs. The expedition also proved a commercial failure as Paraguay proved to be less wealthy than expected and merchant ships were forced to return with many of their goods unsold. On their return the convoy again faced fierce resistance with several merchant ships sunk by cannon fire.

Whilst the British commander Ouseley requested additional forces to support a continued campaign a number of factors compelled the British to break with their French allies. The outcome of the expedition with the cost of victory and limited commercial opportunities changed British attitudes. Argentina owed a substantial debt to Barings Bank and suspension of payments due to the blockade had caused financial concerns. The Times had also printed an allegation that Ouseley had a personal financial interest in the blockade, causing a political scandal. Tomás Samuel Hood was sent to Buenos Aires with the instruction to negotiate a settlement with Rosas at all costs. On November 24, 1949, Britain signed the Arana-Southern Treaty with Argentina, leaving the conflict.

== Negotiations ==
Negotiations with France took a longer time than with Britain. There was a strong nationalism in France by that time, and a second defeat with Argentina would hurt the national pride. The parliament was divided in two proposals: to send Le Prédour with a very powerful navy, to make a treaty favourable to the French terms by intimidating Rosas, or to openly declare war. The first proposal was accepted by 338 votes over 300. Rosas refused to negotiate unless the threatening navy was removed from Uruguay, and refused to acknowledge Le Prédour as a diplomat. Le Prédour made up an excuse for the navy, and negotiated for nearly five months. Rosas finally agreed on August 31, 1850, to a pair of small concessions that did not actually modify the important points of the treaty: Rosas would remove the Argentine troops from Montevideo at the same time that France removed theirs, but keeping a portion of them during the first months of Oribe's rule to prevent anarchy; and Argentina would refer to Oribe in the document as "President of the Republic" while France would do so as "Brigadier General". Before leaving the city, the French vessel transporting Le Prédour would also make a 21-gun salute to the flag of Argentina.

The final treaty was signed by Argentinian Minister of Foreign Affairs Felipe Arana and Admiral Fortuné Le Prédour de Kerambriec on August 31, 1850. It is accordingly known as the Arana - Le Predour Convention or the Arana - Le Predour Treaty (sometimes spelled Lepredour).

== See also ==
- Anglo-French blockade of the Río de la Plata
- Spanish Wikisource has original text related to this article: Treaty text
- Arana-Southern Treaty
