= Mansilla =

Mansilla may refer to:

- Mansilla (surname), a Spanish surname
- Mansilla de la Sierra, a place in Spain
- Mansilla de las Mulas, a place in Spain
- Mansilla Mayor, a place in Spain
- Gobernador Mansilla, a place in Argentina

== See also ==
- Mansilla + Tuñón Architects, a Spanish architecture firm
