= Anglo-French blockade of the Río de la Plata =

1845–50 naval blockade by Britain and France during the Uruguayan Civil War

- Part of the Uruguayan Civil War
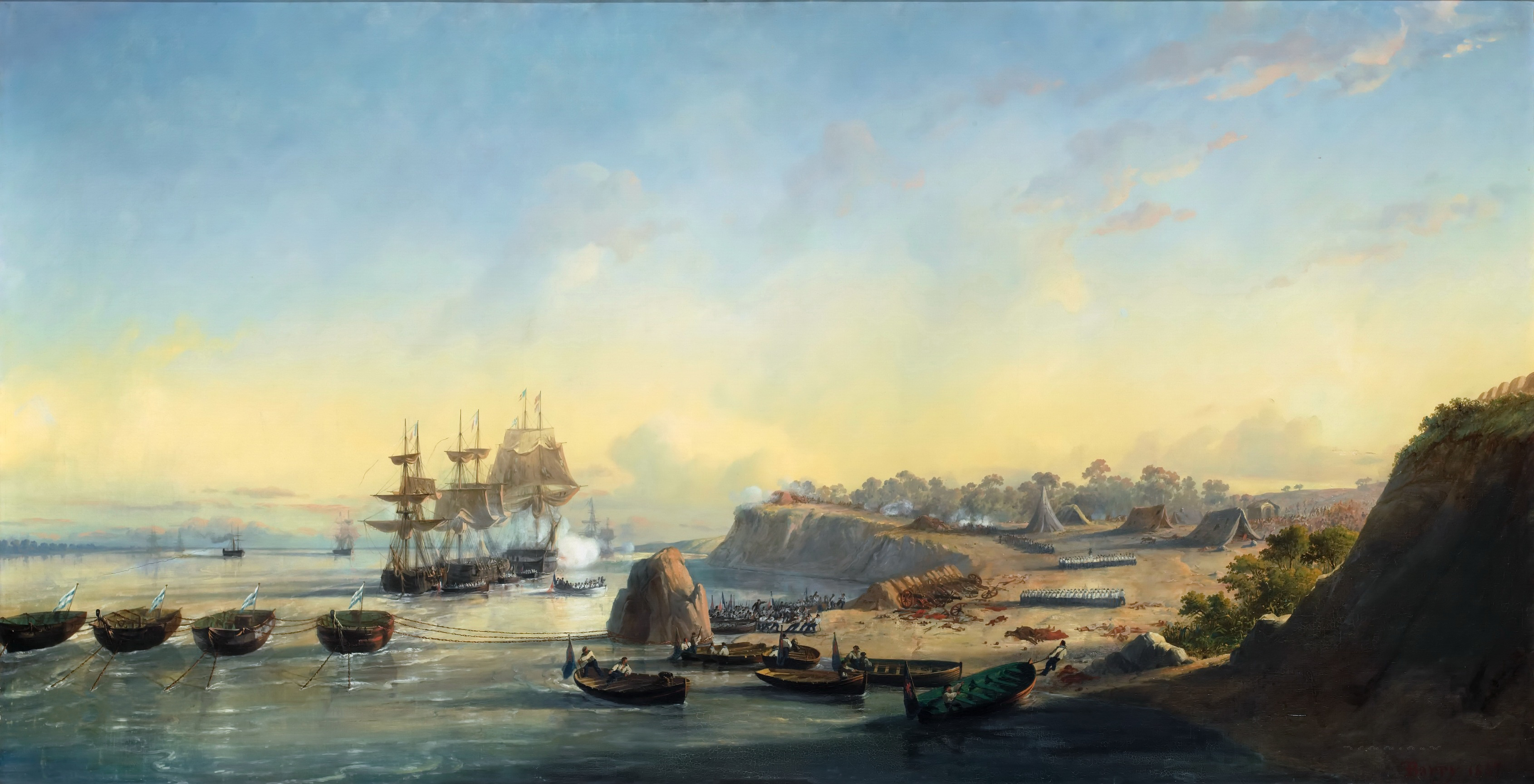
- A painting of the Battle of Vuelta de Obligado by François Pierre Barry
Date	1845–1850
Location	Río de la Plata Basin
Result	Argentine victory: Arana–Southern Treaty; Arana–Lepredour Treaty

Belligerents
Argentina; Supported by: White Party	United Kingdom; France; Supported by: Colorados; Redshirts

Commanders and leaders
Juan Manuel de Rosas; Lucio Norberto Mansilla; William Brown; Manuel Oribe	William Gore Ouseley; Samuel Inglefield; Antoine-Louis Deffaudis; François Thomas Tréhouart; Fructuoso Rivera; Giuseppe Garibaldi

Casualties and losses
At least 250 killed.	At least 150 killed, 6 merchant ships sunk and a large part of the naval fleet damaged.

The Anglo-French blockade of the Río de la Plata, also known as Paraná War, was a five-year naval blockade imposed by France and the United Kingdom on the Argentine Confederation during the Uruguayan Civil War. It was imposed by the Royal Navy and French Navy in 1845 against the Río de la Plata Basin to support the Colorado Party in Uruguay's civil war, resulting in the closure of Buenos Aires to maritime commerce. The Argentine government, led by Juan Manuel de Rosas, refused to drop their support for the Uruguayan White Party, which supported Argentina's resistance to the blockade. Eventually, both Britain and France ended the blockade, signing the Arana–Southern Treaty in 1849 and 1850 respectively, which acknowledged Argentine sovereignty over its rivers.

== Background ==
=== Local context ===
Buenos Aires faced the French blockade of the Río de la Plata between 1838 and 1840. The Peru–Bolivian Confederation, allied with France, fought the War of the Confederation with Argentina. Rosas resisted the blockade longer than France estimated he would do, and his strategy of generating disputes between France and England over the blockade eventually bore fruit. France lifted the blockade in 1840, exchanging mutual most favoured nation status between her and the Argentine Confederation.

Unable to deploy French troops during the blockade, France promoted civil wars against Rosas to support the naval actions. For this purpose, France aided Fructuoso Rivera against the Uruguayan president Manuel Oribe, who was forced to resign. Oribe escaped to Buenos Aires, and Rosas received him as the legitimate president of Uruguay, denying such recognition to Rivera. This started the Uruguayan Civil War, where the Blancos sought to restore Oribe in power and the Colorados to keep Rivera. As Rivera was hesitant to attack Rosas as the French expected, the Argentine expatriate Juan Lavalle was convinced to do so, but his army bolstered by French troops was nevertheless weakened by desertions and hostility from the local population on their march to Buenos Aires, and French monetary support was curtailed, as France conducted negotiated peace with Rosas by that time. Lavalle's army retreated to the north in disorder, without attacking Buenos Aires as intended.

Rivera's ambition was to expand the borders of Uruguay, annexing Paraguay, the Argentine Mesopotamia and the Riograndense Republic (part of Rio Grande do Sul, which had declared independence from Brazil and was fighting the Ragamuffin War), into a projected Federation of Uruguay. The Argentine José María Paz, allied with Rivera against Rosas, was against this project. Rivera took control of Paz's forces, but without his superior military training, he was completely defeated by Oribe at the battle of Arroyo Grande. Rivera's project never got off the ground, and he was forced to stand in Montevideo against Oribe's siege.

Brazil proposed a military alliance to Rosas: Rosas would take Uruguay with Brazilian support, and Brazil would take the Riograndese Republic with Argentine support. Tomás Guido, Argentine representative in Brazil, supported the proposal, but Rosas rejected it. Rosas thought that such treaty would violate Uruguayan sovereignty, and that it would be null if Oribe was not part of it. Honório Carneiro Leão, representative of Brazil, did not accept Rosas's alternative proposal, and Brazil distanced itself from Argentina.

=== International context ===
Britain did not have great interests at stake in Buenos Aires. The purpose of the war was to foster friendly diplomatic relations with France, so as to make possible later joint military operations elsewhere, such as the Opium War or the protection of the independence of the Republic of Texas. The British interests in South America grew when Texas was finally annexed by the United States. Texas supplied Britain with cotton, and the British calculated that it would be easier to secure cotton sources in South America (such as Paraguay) rather than waging war with the powerful United States. Britain republished many Uruguayan libels against Rosas, such as the Blood tables, so that people supported military action against him. As there was a strong British religious tradition, Rosas was accused of replacing the crosses of churches with his portrait, persecuting religion, and killing priests; and that he may have murdered his wife Encarnación Ezcurra and had incestuous relations with his daughter.

Two influential French politicians of the time were the foreign minister François Guizot and the nationalist Adolphe Thiers. Thiers proposed that France should continue the hostilities against Rosas. He explained his opinion with three main reasons and an accessory one: humanity, patriotism, international law and expansion of commerce. He viewed Rosas as a ruthless dictator, to justify the humanitarian reason. Although Montevideo was not a French colony, he referred to it as such due to its high population of French Basques. He considered that Rosas would be in contravention of the 4th article of the Mackau-Arana treaty (in which the Confederation recognized the independence of Uruguay) by attempting to impose an Argentine president on it. The expansion of commerce was not mentioned as a main reason, as Rosist protectionist policy limited but did not forbid French imports. Guizot rejected these ideas. He did not consider that Rosas contravened the Mackau-Arana treaty because the Confederation was not actually at war with Uruguay, but was merely supporting one Uruguayan faction against the other. He did not think that the French economy could be further benefited by taking action in La Plata, nor that it was workable to keep a colony in the zone. In respect to humanitarian reasons, he dismissed the purported Rosist crimes because they were based on reports by the Unitarian Florencio Varela, who had no reputation as an impartial reporter. However, Guitoz ultimately agreed to the proposal, in order to foster an alliance with Britain and reduce the popular acclaim of Thiers.

Brazilian viscount Miguel Calmon du Pin e Almeida met the British Lord Aberdeen to request that Brazil join Britain and France in the action against Rosas. But Britain did not have good relations with Brazil at that time, so Aberdeen rejected the Brazilian aid. Aberdeen complained that, if Brazil thought that civilization was tied with free trade, Brazil should accept extending their free trade agreement with Britain before imposing it on Rosas, and that if Brazil was concerned with humanitarian reasons they should start by abolishing slavery in their own country. Then he met Guizot, who was not receptive either. Guizot felt forced by circumstances to join a war where he did not expect to earn anything, and was reluctant to involve French troops in it. Britain would not resort to ground troops either, as the British invasions of the Río de la Plata had proved them ineffective. The viscount informed the Brazilian court of the Anglo-French resolution. The public purposes of the war were to protect the Uruguayan independence against Oribe, defend the recently proclaimed independence of Paraguay, and end the civil wars at La Plata. He also revealed the secret purposes: To turn Montevideo into a "commercial factory", to force the free navigation of the rivers, to turn the Argentine Mesopotamia into a new country, to set the borders of Uruguay, Paraguay and the Mesopotamia (without Brazilian intervention), and to help the antirosistas to depose the governor of Buenos Aires and to establish one loyal to the European powers. For the viscount, it was an all-losing situation for Brazil: if the intervention was defeated, they would be helpless against the counter-attack of Rosas, Oribe and perhaps the Ragamuffins; and if the intervention prevailed, Brazil would have neighbors even more powerful than the Confederation. Thus, he strongly advised against joining it, and restoring good relations with Rosas if possible.

William Brent, representative of the United States in Buenos Aires and supporter of the Monroe Doctrine, supported Rosas in the dispute with the European powers, and proposed to act as mediator. After the victory at the battle of India Muerta, Oribe was about to enter Montevideo. Brent proposed that he did so giving an amnesty to the supporters of Rivera, calling to elections in the Legislature, and then the Argentine forces supporting him should leave the country at that point. Oribe accepted, but the British arrived at Montevideo and refused to allow Oribe to enter the city. Arana, Deffaudis and Ouseley rejected Brent's mediation, and gave an ultimatum: if the army of Oribe and the Argentine navy of William Brown did not leave Uruguay in ten days, they would proceed to blockade Buenos Aires.

== Beginning of armed actions ==
The same night the ultimatum was issued, still during the ten days period, the British ship Cadmus and the French one D'Assas anchored next to the Argentine ships San Martín and 25 de mayo. William Brown requested permission to return to Buenos Aires, which was allowed but with the condition of delivering the British and French sailors. Brown requested permission to do so in Buenos Aires, as most of his crew was Irish, but received no answer. When he finally sailed back to Buenos Aires, he was attacked. The Anglo-French forcibly boarded and seized the complete Argentine navy, the ships San Martín, 25 de mayo, General Echagüe, Maipú and 9 de julio. The French raised their flag in the first two, and the British did so in the last three. The Argentine officers were returned to Buenos Aires, and William Brown and all the British sailors were forbidden to sail under the Argentine flag during the remainder of the conflict.

The following day, the Anglo-French forces disembarked in Montevideo, reinforcing the defenses of the city. Since the defeat at India Muerta, the Montevidean defenders were less than 3500. Rivera expressed gratitude for these actions, saying that they had secured Uruguayan independence. Many politicians of Buenos Aires criticized them during a meeting in the Junta of Representatives in Buenos Aires.

Rosas learned in 1838 that the Isla Martín García was difficult to defend, so he removed the forces from it. However, to prevent foreign claims of sovereignty, he left a force of twelve aged crippled soldiers, who would keep the flag of Argentina raised until the end. The only purpose of this army was to assert that the island was not left abandoned, and that the Anglo-French forces would only take it by an invasion. General Lucio Mansilla received the forces and infrastructure of Martín García, to select a point in the Paraná River and fortify it. The west side of the river was preferred, to have easier communications with Buenos Aires. However, the support to the Uruguayan Oribe took priority, and no Argentine forces supporting the siege would be retired from it, not even temporarily. Mansilla prepared the defenses at Obligado, Buenos Aires, near San Pedro.

=== Declaration of blockade ===
The blockade was formally declared on 18 September 1845. They cited many reasons. They said that Rosas did not stop the war despite their good intentions, or that the capture of the Argentine navy, invasion of Martín García and reinforcement of Montevideo were described in violent language at Buenos Aires newspapers, which was also found at the meeting of the Junta or in the messages that called the Unitarians savages. A decree of 27 August had forbidden all Argentines to communicate with the Anglo-French navy. They also said that the foreigners in Buenos Aires were abused and drafted into the army, that Oribe made a butchery after the victory at India Muerta, and that the police was headed by the Mazorca, which would make several abuses. The tone was closer to that of a declaration of war, and may have been written by Florencio Varela.

To counter those claims, Rosas arranged a meeting with diplomats from the United States, Portugal, Sardinia, Bolivia and France. The British diplomat refused to assist, but the French Mareuil did so. All of them declared unanimously that they had no complaints about the treatment to foreigners, that they had no knowledge of foreigners forced by terror into the military or to sign petitions, that they had no knowledge of abuses from the Mazorca, and that the information of alleged butcheries in India Muerta was inexact. Rosas included as well a petition signed by 15 000 British and French living in Buenos Aires, protesting against the blockade. Rosas was confident in that this formal declaration, signed by foreign diplomats, would counter the Montevidean propaganda and turn the international opinion to his side.

Durán de Mareuil, representative of French business in Buenos Aires, was among the signatories. He wrote a document requesting the end of the blockade, which included Rosas's demands. Those demands were the inclusion of Oribe in the negotiations, disarm of Montevideo, return of Colonia, Martín García and the captured navy, departure from the internal rivers, acknowledgement of the sovereignty of Argentina and an indemnification. As expected, it was rejected in Montevideo, so Mareuil moved to Paris to give it directly to the French government.

== Uruguay River ==
The Anglo-French navy navigated the internal Uruguay river by mid August, led by Lainé and Inglefield. They announced that they would block any ports supporting Oribe, and remove the people in them with gunshots. In response, the ports were closed to any communication with the Anglo-French navy. Lainé and Inglefield moved to Colonia del Sacramento, with Giuseppe Garibaldi and his legion of Italian volunteers. They had a total of 28 ships, whereas Jaime Montoro, colonel defending the city had only 300 soldiers and eight small cannons. The Italian legion disembarked in the city and pillaged it. José Luis Bustamante blamed Garibaldi for it, while Garibaldi would attribute it to a lack of military discipline among his Legion. He would write in his memoirs that "the repression of disorder was difficult, considering that Colonia had plenty of resources, and specially of spirituous [liquor] that increased the desires of the virtuous pillagers". Even the local church was sacked, and the drunk Italians spent the night in it.

The navy moved then to Martín García, 550 French troops defeating the 125-strong army detachment under Colonel Geronimo Costa stationed there. The flag of Argentina was removed, and replaced with the flag of Uruguay. The Argentine soldiers were removed, and the island was left abandoned.

The ship moved then into the Uruguay River. The pillage of Gualeguaychú was even worse than in Colonia, to the point that Bustamante wrote to Rivera worried about Garibaldi, fearing that his actions would discredit the whole operation. Garibaldi described that "The city of Gualeguaychú drove us to conquest by being a real emporium of wealth, capable to dress our ragged soldiers and supply us with harnesses. We acquired many and very good horses in Gualeguaychú, the clothes needed to dress all the people, the harnesses of cavalry and some money distributed among our poor soldiers and sailors, who suffered so much time of misery and privations". Garibaldi's plunder was valued at nearly £30,000.

Garibaldi was defeated at Paysandú by colonel Antonio Díaz, and then at Concordia, defended by Juan Antonio Lavalleja and an improvised navy. Then, he took control and pillaged Salto. By November, the Anglo-French navy had control of all the Uruguay River from Colonia to Salto.

== Paraná River ==
Once Montevideo had enough defenses, Ouseley and Defauis prepared a convoy to navigate the Paraná River. This way they would reach Corrientes and Paraguay and, once having complete control of Uruguay and both rivers, force the Mesopotamia out of the Confederation. The convoy was composed of three steamboats, capable to navigate independently from the winds and a number of heavily armed sailboats. Those ships would protect 90 merchant vessels, of diverse nationalities. Arana notified the foreign diplomats that the ships entering the Paraná unauthorized would be reputed as pirates, so they informed their respective ships that they would not have protection from their home countries if they got involved in the operation. However, such messages were delayed, and the 90 ships took part of the operation anyway.

The Anglo-French weaponry was the most advanced of the time. They used Peysar rifled cannons, and the French brought the new Paixhans guns. The allies also bombarded the Confederation batteries with Congreve rockets. This would be the first time such weapons would be used in South America, and they expected their firepower to be devastating.

The convoy stopped at the Paraná Guazú channel to study the situation. Initially, the admirals thought that they would navigate unopposed, but found that Lucio Mansilla had prepared many fortifications along the river. As a result, the merchant ships would stay behind, while the combat steams opened the way. There were fortifications at Ramada, Tonelero, Acevedo, and San Lorenzo. The most important fortification was located in Obligado, near San Pedro.

=== Battle of Vuelta de Obligado ===
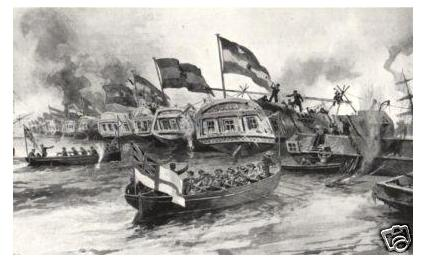
French and British ships breaking the chains in Obligado.

In Obligado the Paraná is only 700 m (2,300 ft) wide, and the turning made sailboat navigation difficult. Mansilla placed 24 boats in succession, holding three thick chains to close the river. The west coast was the only one fortified, with four batteries. The biggest Argentine cannons were of caliber 20, whereas the average in the Anglo-French navy was of 80. The land was defended by the Regiment of Patricians, and the volunteers from the countryside were led by Facundo Quiroga (son of the famed caudillo of the same name). Many artilleries were operated by British sailors from the captured Argentine fleet, who disobeyed the orders of not fighting against their home country. A brig of six cannons was the only Argentine combat vessel.

The first steam boats arrived to Obligado on 18 November, stopping beyond the range of the cannons. They waited for the captured San Martín ship, captained by Trehouart, who arrived the following day. The attack was delayed one more day, because the rain did not allow a clear sight of the fortifications. The ships advanced on 20 November. Lucio Mansilla arranged the troops saying: "There they are! Consider the insult they make to the sovereignty of our nation by navigating, with no more title than force, the waters of a river that flows across the territory of our country. But they won't achieve that unpunished! Let the blue and white banner wave in the Parana, and let's all of us die before seeing it come down from where it waves!"

The first ship to advance was the San Martín. She was about to break the chains when the wind suddenly ended and she got stuck in the place, too far from the other ships, which could not got near because of the lack of wind. The San Martín was hit more than a hundred times, two cannons were destroyed, and two officers and forty sailors died. Finally, the chain of San Martín's anchor was broken, and she moved down the river. The Dolphin and Pandour had to retreat as well.

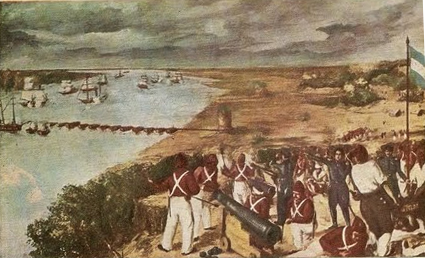
Battle of Vuelta de Obligado

When the Republicano ran out of ammunition, the captain blew it to prevent it from being captured. At this point, the steamboats (unaffected by the lack of wind) proceeded to the chains. Their powerful guns outranged the Argentine cannons. The Fulton got to the chains and broke them, and the wind blew again. The ships moved, and the defenses gradually ran out of ammunition as well. By the end of the day, all batteries were destroyed, and the cannons were destroyed or taken as trophies. 250 Argentine soldiers died, and 400 were injured. The Anglo-French fleet stayed 40 days in Obligado, making repairs.

=== Consequences of Obligado ===
Word of the actions in Obligado spread around the continent in 1846. Most of the press, that so far had repeated the Montevidean libels, turned instead to support Rosas. Brazilian newspapers such as O Brado de Amazonas and O Sentinella da Monarchia referred to Rosas as a great South American hero. Francisco Antonio Pinto, former president of Chile, declared that the Chilean people was ashamed of the presence in Chile of a pair of newspapers that supported the Anglo-French cause. The president of Bolivia José Ballivián, who was so far against Rosas, instructed his diplomat Manuel Rodríguez to congratulate Rosas for the action of Obligado and protest "with reason of the disloyal and unjust Anglo-French intervention in the Río de la Plata against the rights and interests of the Americas". José de San Martín wrote a supporting letter to Rosas and, despite his old age, offered his military assistance. He also wrote a letter to the British Morning Chronicle, explaining that a military occupation of Buenos Aires by Anglo-French forces would be nearly impossible.

The convoy resumed their navigation after the repairs, but with only 52 of the original 90 commercial ships, as the others returned to Montevideo. Mansilla made new attacks at the batteries in Tonelero and Acevedo, but the ships were not damaged very much. By moving to the east side of the river, they could fire against the batteries and destroy them from a safe distance. Mansilla made a more effective resistance at San Lorenzo on 4 June 1846, on the same site where José de San Martín fought the battle of San Lorenzo. The batteries here were hidden, and attacked the Anglo-French navy by surprise. Many merchant ships collided with others, and the steam ships fired for more than four hours. According to the British report, all ships received shots during the engagement.

The Fulton arrived to Asunción, with the intention to recognize the independence of Paraguay, recruit them against Rosas, and sign a treaty of commerce and friendship. Carlos Antonio López did not agree to the British terms; he expected recognition first, war later, and a treaty for the end, not all things at once. The commerce failed, as Corrientes and Paraguay were not as wealthy as the Anglo-French expected, and they returned with most of their products.

The return seemed difficult, as many ships were damaged and Mansilla was rearming the north of San Lorenzo, so they requested Montevideo to send reinforcements. The Philomel advanced at full speed, not answering fire whenever possible, reaching Montevideo in few days. The British steamboats Lizard and Harpy moved to reunite with the convoy. Those ships, however, stopped at Quebracho and returned fire, and the Lizard was badly damaged as a result.

Mansilla prepared a strong defense in Quebracho, against the returning convoy. He did not prepare chains to close the river this time, as the ships would be moving downstream, rather than upstream. This new attack was very successful. The Argentine cannons attacked the enemy ships at will, and the merchant ships attempted in vain to pass behind the warships. Two merchant ships were sunk, and others had to throw their cargo in the river to reduce their weight. The steam boats were the focus of the attack, the Harpy was disabled and the Gorgon suffered great damages. After three hours of fire, the ships escaped as they could, and four damaged merchant ships were set on fire to avoid Argentine capture.

== End of the conflict ==
After the failure of the expedition to the Parana, Ouseley wrote to his government requesting 10,000 British soldiers, 10,000 French soldiers and an open declaration of war to conclude the conflict. In 1846 the 73rd (Perthshire) Regiment of Foot sailed from Cork, and after docking at Rio de Janeiro, arrived in Montevideo, which it defended for seven months against besieging Argentine troops. However, unknown to Ouseley, Thomas Samuel Hood was already navigating to Buenos Aires with the opposite instructions from the allied countries: negotiate an end to the hostilities, at whatever price Rosas demanded. The repercussion of the battle of Vuelta de Obligado modified the international perception of the conflict in La Plata. Hood had also promoted an end to the conflicts because Rosas had suspended the payment of the Argentine foreign debt to Britain as long as Britain maintained the blockade, and a long conflict would harm the finances of the Baring Brothers bank. Besides, there was an ongoing political scandal in Britain, as The Times had written that Ouseley was favouring a personal business with the blockade.

Hood arranged with Rosas the conditions for peace, but Ouseley and Deffaudis refused to obey it. Deffaudis argued that he had no instructions from Paris to seek a peaceful resolution, and Ouseley that he had to work together with Deffaudis. Hood returned to Britain with the proposal negotiated with Rosas. The British government was inclined to leave the conflict, but it was reluctant to accept the Hood bases, as they would mean a capitulation. Britain and France sent two new diplomats, John Hobart Caradoc and Alexandre Florian Joseph Colonna, who would pretend to agree with the Hood bases but surreptitiously change the terms. Rosas realized the trick, and did not accept their new proposal. They moved then to Uruguay, and negotiated an armistice with Oribe. Oribe accepted the British terms, but Rivera did not. This broke the alliance: the British diplomat was convinced that the terms were reasonable, and decided to go on with his original mission of ending the conflict. The French one declared instead that they would keep the blockade, even if it meant doing so alone. In mid-1847, Britain withdrew from the blockade. Thereafter, only a single French warship remained stationed off Buenos Aires, before it too withdrew in late 1848.

In 1848, Rosas received new diplomats, Henry Southern and Lepredour, but refused to have an interview with them before being aware of their intentions. Rosas wanted them to agree to the Hood bases, and would not accept anything else. The Arana-Southern Treaty with Britain was finally signed on 3 March 1849, in strict conformity with the terms negotiated with Hood. Britain would return the captured ships, the Martín García island, remove their troops from Uruguay, accept the Argentine sovereignty over its internal waters, and condition the whole treaty to the approval of Oribe. Finally, the British navy would make a 21-gun salute to the flag of Argentina.

Negotiations with France took a longer time. There was a strong nationalism in France by that time, and a second defeat with Argentina would hurt the national pride. The parliament was divided in two proposals: to send Lepredour with a very powerful navy, to make a treaty favourable to the French terms by intimidating Rosas, or to openly declare war. The first proposal was accepted by 338 votes over 300. Rosas refused to negotiate unless the threatening navy was removed from Uruguay, and refused to acknowledge Lepredour as a diplomat. Lepredour made up an excuse for the navy, and negotiated for nearly five months. Rosas finally agreed on 31 August 1850, to a pair of small concessions that did not actually modify the important points of the treaty: Rosas would remove the Argentine troops from outside Montevideo at the same time that the foreign legion evacuated Montevideo, but keeping a portion of them during the first months of Oribe's rule to prevent anarchy; and Argentina would refer to Oribe in the document as "President of the Republic" while France would do so as "Brigadier General". Before leaving the city, the French vessel transporting Lepredour would also make a 21-gun salute to the flag of Argentina.

== Historical perspectives ==
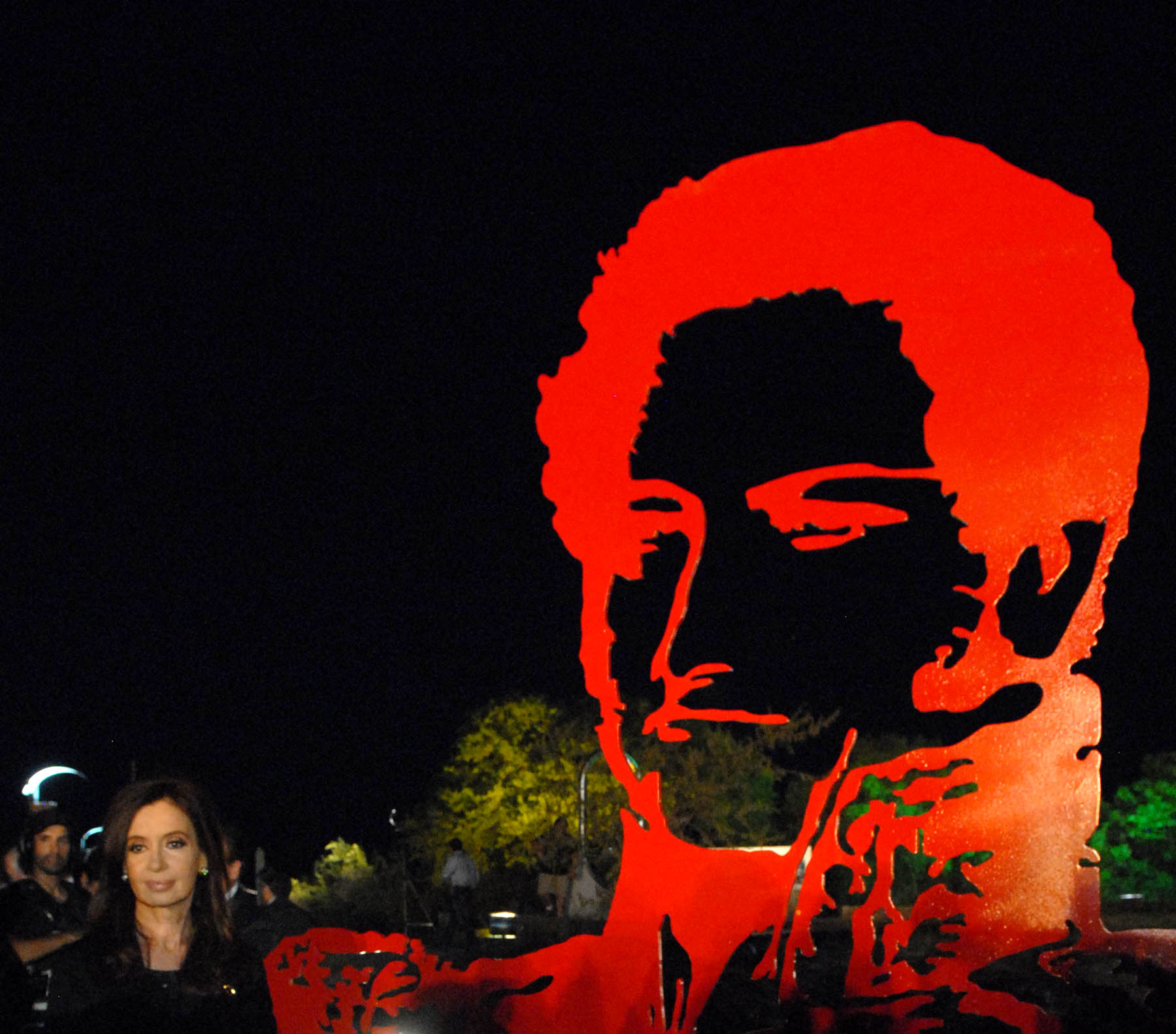
Cristina Fernández de Kirchner during the celebrations of the Day of National Sovereignty.

The historical significance of the conflict is disputed between Argentine historians. Revisionist authors consider it a key event in the history of Argentina, next to the Argentine War of Independence, while traditional historians disagree. A recent example of this conflicting viewpoints took place on 18 November 2010, before the first celebration of the National Sovereignty day (in commemoration of the main battle of the conflict, the Battle of Vuelta de Obligado) as a national holiday. The newspaper La Nación interviewed revisionist historian Pacho O'Donnell, traditional historian Luis Alberto Romero and British historian David Rock.

Luis Alberto Romero considers that the importance of the battle is overrated because it was a defeat: the Anglo-French navy destroyed the artilleries and proceed to the north, as they wanted to do. The end of the blockade in terms favourable to the Confederation was more the result of a change of policy by the Foreign Office after the appointment of Lord Palmerston than a success of Rosas' diplomacy. Pacho O'Donnell considers that, even though the combined fleet could force its way, it ultimately failed in its main purposes: they could not turn the Argentine Mesopotamia into a new country, nor gain total control of the Parana River, nor establish their presence in the zone. David Rock concurs, but considers that it is exaggerated to treat the battle as an "epic". He points that the number of casualties in it may be high in the context of the military history of Argentina, but not on a global scale, as it was nowhere near the 1916 Battle of the Somme, with more than 20,000 deaths in just half an hour.

Pacho O'Donnell considers as well that traditional historiography had concealed the battle of Vuelta de Obligado. Romero considers instead that, despite not giving it the higher importance, the battle is properly referenced at all the books about the time period.

According to Historicising intervention: strategy and synchronicity in British intervention 1815–50, the British government's intentions were "to pacify the republics of the Plate, secure the definitive independence of Uruguay, and the advancement of Britain's commercial and diplomatic relations with all the states in the region, perhaps also establishing contacts with Paraguay". The British expedition, commissioned without parliamentary authorisation and inconsistent with the non-intervention policy previously declared by the Foreign Office, then led by Lord Aberdeen, eventually withdrew, largerly under Rosas' terms. The British mission is assessed a failure, which exposed both at home and abroad the British weakness to deal with "half-civilised governments".

== Bibliography ==
- Cady, John Frank. Foreign Intervention in the Rio de la Plata, 1838–50: A Study of French, British, and American Policy in Relation to the Dictator Juan Manuel Rosas (University of Pennsylvania Press, 1929).
- Rosa, José María (1974) [1970], Historia Argentina [History of Argentina] (in Spanish), vol. V, Buenos Aires: Editorial Oriente
- de Santillán, Diego Abad (1965), Historia Argentina [Argentinian History] (in Spanish), Buenos Aires: TEA (Tipográfica Editora Argentina)
