= Agustina Ortiz de Rozas =

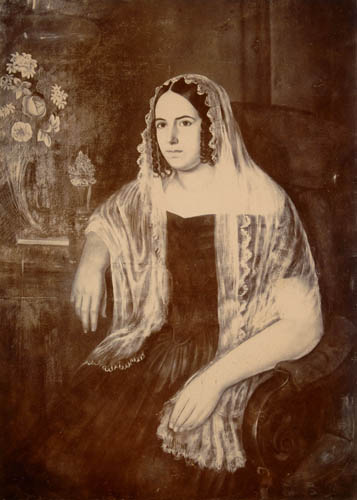
Portrait of Agustina Ortiz de Rozas

Agustina Ortiz de Rozas (1826-1898) was an Argentine philanthropist and political figure, president of the Sociedad de Beneficencia. She was the youngest sister of the general Juan Manuel de Rosas and was born in Buenos Aires. Ortiz married Lucio Norberto Mansilla at 15 years of age and had the five children: Lucio Victorio Mansilla, Eduarda, Lucio Norberto, Agustina and Carlos. She was renowned as one of the most beautiful women of her time according to many of her contemporaries. She played some role in Argentina's founding.
