= Napoleone Moriani =

Italian opera singer

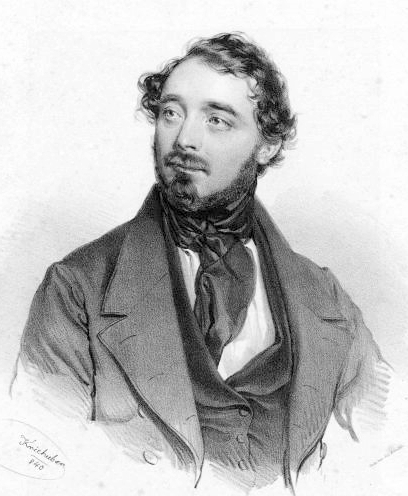
Portrait by Joseph Kriehuber

Napoleone Moriani (10 March 1808 – 4 March 1878) was an Italian operatic tenor, appearing in opera houses throughout Europe.

== Life ==
Moriani was born in Florence in 1808. He came from a wealthy family, and he studied law at the University of Pisa, intending to become a lawyer. Since his tenor voice was well regarded in society, he tried an operatic career: his debut, in Pavia at the Teatro dei Condomini in 1833, was successful.

During the following years he appeared on stage in many Italian cities, and from 1840 elsewhere in Europe: in Vienna at the Theater am Kärntnertor, in Germany including Dresden at the Court Theatre, in London at Her Majesty's Theatre and Drury Lane, and in Spain and Portugal, including the Teatro de la Cruz in Madrid; he was decorated by the Queen of Spain with the Order of Isabella.

Popular roles included Edgardo in Lucia di Lammermoor and Gennaro in Lucrezia Borgia, both operas by Gaetano Donizetti; he also appeared as Arturo in I Puritani by Vincenzo Bellini; in operas by Saverio Mercadante he was Ruggiero in Emma d'Antiochia, Odone in I normanni a Parigi and Carlo in Il bravo. He appeared in many other operas. Francesco Regli wrote that "every note was charged with a wave of passion". Moriani shared many acclaimed performances with Giuseppina Strepponi. Frank Walker in his book Verdi The Man came to the conclusion that Moriani was the father of two of the three Strepponi's children (born in 1838 and 1839, both dead early).

Julian Marshall wrote of his appearances in London in 1844 and 1845: "He came with a real Italian reputation, but he came too late in his own career, and too early for a public that had not yet forgotten what Italian tenors had been.... he pleased little here." Because of a chronic disease of the larynx, his career declined early, and from the 1850s he lived in retirement on an estate he purchased near Greve in Chianti.

Moriani and his wife Elvira had four children. He died in Florence in 1878.
