= Lucio Victorio Mansilla =

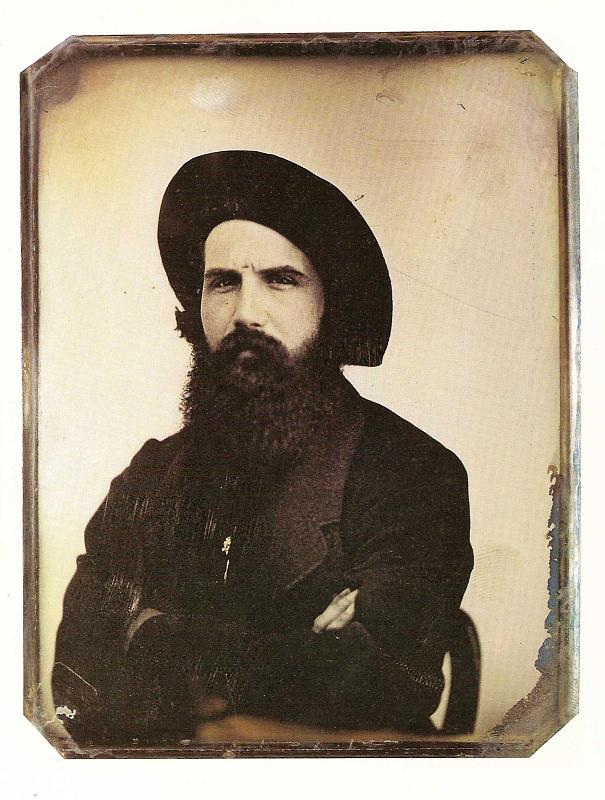
- Mansilla around 1855

Governor of Gran Chaco
- In office October 28, 1878 – May 15, 1879
- Preceded by: Pantaleón Gómez
- Succeeded by: Luis Jorge Fontana

President of the Honorable Chamber of Deputies of the Argentine Nation
- In office June 18, 1890 – December 15, 1890
- Preceded by: Benjamín Zorrilla
- Succeeded by: Benjamín Zorrilla

Personal details
- Born: December 23, 1831 Buenos Aires, Argentina
- Died: October 8, 1913 (aged 81) Paris, France
- Parents: Lucio Norberto Mansilla (father); Agustina Ortiz de Rozas (mother)

Lucio Victorio Mansilla (December 23, 1831 – October 8, 1913) was an Argentine general, journalist, politician and diplomat. He was later governor of the territory of the Gran Chaco between 1878 and 1879.

His best-known literary work is An Excursion to the Ranquel Indians, which was the result of an espedition he led in 1870 through the camps of the Ranquel people.

== Early life and family ==
Mansilla was born in Buenos Aires, in a house in the Montserrat neighborhood, on the corner of Tacuarí and Potosí streets (today Alsina), known in colonial times as "the old prison" on December 23, 1831 (Saint Victoria's Day). He was the first-born son of federal colonel Lucio Norberto Mansilla, the hero of the Battle of the Vuelta de Obligado, and Agustina Ortiz de Rozas, tenth sister and younger sister of Juan Manuel de Rosas, a 15-year-old girl who was called the beauty of the federation. His sister was the writer and journalist Eduarda Mansilla.

After finishing school, he was employed in a local firm, where he kept the accounting books. He met and fell in love with one of his cousins, Catalina, with whom he would then marry.

== Adulthood ==
After he returned to Buenos Aires, he was sent to work at the family salting plant located near San Nicolás, which was in charge of his father, where he lived in the latter's house in that town. There he entertained his leisure time reading books from the paternal library. One day he was surprised by his father reading the social contract of Rousseau, which determined that his father, fearing that such readings reach the ears of his uncle Juan Manuel, little affection to those inclinations, decided to send in committee in order to acquire goods on a trip to India, countries of the East and Europe where he knew exotic places for the time like Calcutta and Egypt, ending his trip in London and Paris.

Aware of Urquiza's uprising against his uncle, and worried about the fate of his family, he returned to the country after three years of absence. In 1852 he entered the army, militating among the supporters of the Confederation. After the overthrow of Rosas, as a consequence of the Battle of Caseros, he undertook another trip to Europe, accompanied by his father and brother Lucio Norberto, who shared part of the journey to Brazil with Sarmiento. After he had returned, in August 1852, the romance with his cousin Catherine was reborn.

A year later their first son, Andrés Pío, would be born. Around 1856, he gained an interest in journalism, but an incident in a theater occurred, where he insulted Senator José Mármol loudly, challenging him to a duel for an injury inflicted on his family in the novel Amalia. This ended with him in prison and he was exiled from the city, leading him to settle in the city of Paraná, the capital at the time of Argentina. He carried out political journalism and became secretary to Salvador María del Carril.

== Military and political career ==
After Argentina intervened in the Paraguayan War, he attended the battle of Humaitá and the Estero Bellaco, Tuyutí, Boquerón and Sauce battles. He suffered an injury in the hills of Curupaytí. In 1868 he reached the rank of major and later lieutenant colonel and served as military secretary.. Later he was promoted to colonel, thanks to his support for the campaign for the presidency of Domingo Faustino Sarmiento. By virtue of this, he tried to persuade president to appoint him Minister of War of his cabinet, but Sarmiento did not agree and instead assigned him to the service of the southern border of Córdoba.

Appointed commander of the southern borders of Córdoba, he devoted himself to meticulously exploring the area between the Cuarto and Quinto rivers, as a result drawing a detailed topographic map. Then he made preparations and went into the pampas accompanied by two Franciscan friars and a small escort to deal peacefully with the native people. He visited the chiefs Ramón Cabral and Baigorrita. As a result of this experience, he wrote a series of letters, first published in the Buenos Aires newspaper La Tribuna as a booklet and shortly thereafter edited in book format, an account that constitutes his best-known literary work, An excursion to the Ranquel indians.

On the return of his expedition, which lasted twenty days, in Villa Mercedes, Mansilla found himself suspended from his post because, proceeding without consulting his boss, he had ordered the execution of a recidivist deserter, after a very brief council of war. President Sarmiento closed the summary making it available, with a warning in his service record.

He then devoted himself to journalism, writing articles in the newspapers of the time. Two years later, his friend and president of Argentina, Nicolás Avellaneda, reinstated him in his military position as chief of staff in Córdoba and later chief of borders and military mayor.

From 1882 on he was a deputy during the government of Julio Argentino Roca, and carried out diplomatic missions abroad. His wife, Catherine, died at the end of 1895. He learned of her death months later, as he was on a mission in Nice. In 1896 he settled in Paris, from where he requested his discharge from the army and two years later he published a biography of his uncle Juan Manuel de Rosas with the character of a historical-psychological essay and then two political essays, "On the eve" (1903) and "A country without citizens" (1907) and sent collaborations for the Buenos Aires press.

He was 71 years old when he began to write his "Memories", in which he would recall episodes from his childhood and youth. Towards the end of 1898, on a brief trip to his country, he met Mónica Torromé, widow of Huergo, whose father had installed a commercial firm in London, where she married again the following year and then settled definitively in Paris, in 1902, after carrying out several diplomatic missions in other parts of Europe, functions that he resigned in that year. In his last years he was afflicted with an incipient blindness, and died in that city on October 8, 1913.

== Works ==
- From Aden to Suez (1855)
- An African Revenge (1864)
- An excursion to the ranqueles indians (1870)
- Between us: Thursday Causeries (1889/90, 5 volumes)
- Portraits and memories (1894)
- Moral studies, that is, the diary of my life (1896)
- Rosas, historical-psychological essay (1898)
- Maxims and Thoughts (1904)
- My Memories (1904)
- The hiker on the planet . Travel briefs. Selection of Sandra Contreras (2012)
