= Carlos Gutiérrez Mancilla =

Mexican politician (born 1994)

Member of the Chamber of Deputies
- Incumbent
- Assumed office 1 September 2024
- Constituency: Proportional representation

Personal details
- Born: 19 August 1994 (age 32) Tuxtla Gutiérrez, Chiapas, Mexico
- Party: PRI

Carlos Eduardo Gutiérrez Mancilla (Note: In this Mexican name, the surname is Gutiérrez and the second or maternal family name is Mancilla.) (born 19 August 1994) is a Mexican politician from the Institutional Revolutionary Party (PRI). He is a native of Tuxtla Gutiérrez, Chiapas.

In the 2024 general election, he was elected to a plurinominal seat in the Chamber of Deputies for the duration of the 66th Congress. He is also the president of the youth wing of the Permanent Conference of Political Parties of Latin America and the Caribbean (COPPPAL).

Gutiérrez Mancilla has been involved in several instances of legislative violence during his congressional term.
