= François Thomas Tréhouart =

French admiral (1798–1873)

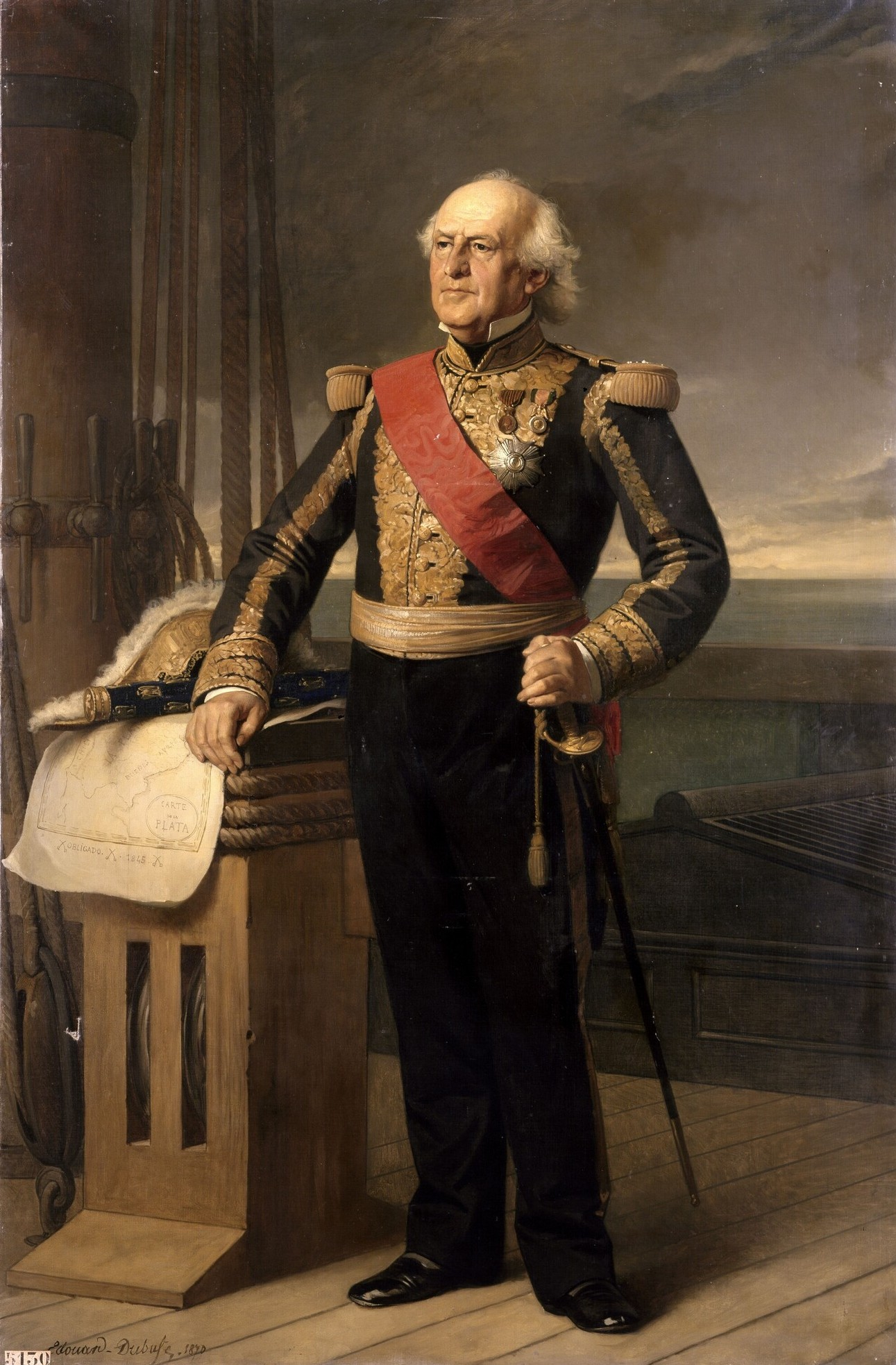
François Thomas Tréhouart

François Thomas Tréhouart (27 April 1798 – 8 November 1873) was a French admiral, notable as the last holder to date of the rank of Admiral of France, to which he was appointed on 20 February 1869. He was a recipient of the grand cross of the Order of Isabella II.

He first saw action at Navarino in 1827, then at the blockade of the Rio de la Plata. He was made a contre-amiral on 15 February 1846, becoming a grand officer of the Légion d'honneur on 18 July 1849. He rose to become a vice-admiral on 2 April 1851 before being sent to the Crimea to replace admiral Bruat. He was made préfet maritime of the 2nd maritime arrondissement maritime (Brest) from 1852 to 1855 and promoted to grand cross of the Légion d'honneur on 16 June 1856. He was then a senator from 16 August 1859 until his death.
