= National Sovereignty Day =

Public holiday of Argentina

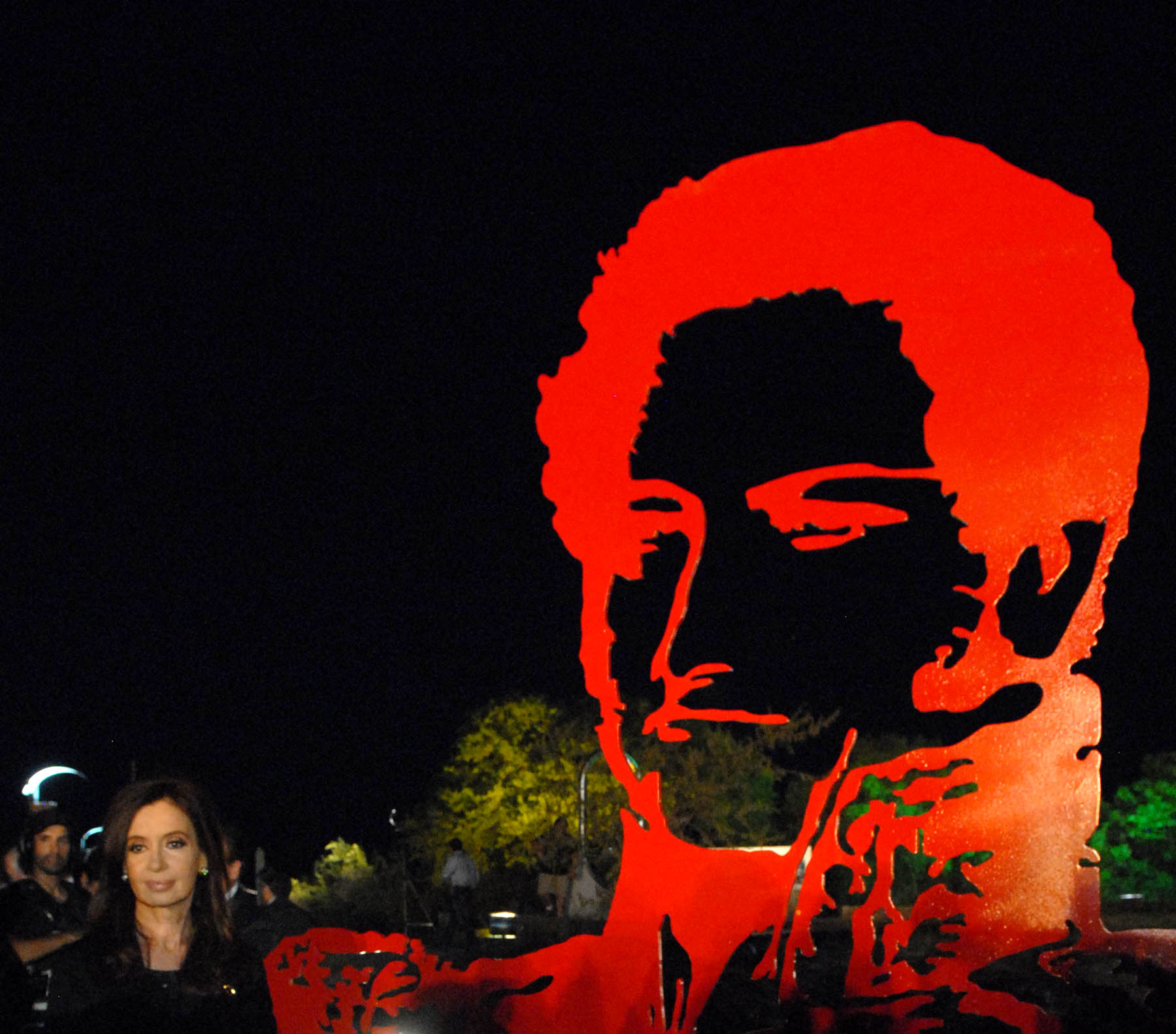
- Image of Juan Manuel de Rosas used during the 2010 celebration of the Day of National Sovereignty.
- Official name: Día de la soberanía nacional
- Observed by: Argentina
- Significance: The day the Argentine Confederation fought against an Anglo-French navy in the Battle of Vuelta de Obligado, during the Anglo-French blockade of the Río de la Plata
- Date: November 20
- Frequency: annual

The National Sovereignty Day (Spanish: Día de la Soberanía Nacional) is a national public holiday of Argentina, celebrated during November 20. It commemorates the Battle of Vuelta de Obligado, which took place on 20 November 1845 during the Anglo-French blockade of the Río de la Plata. Argentine Confederation forces, led by Juan Manuel de Rosas, were attacked by a combined Anglo-French fleet. Although the attackers broke through Argentine defenses and routed Rosas' forces, the heavy losses they suffered proved that foreign ships could not safely navigate Argentina's internal waters against its government's wishes. The battle also changed political attitudes toward the Argentine Confederation among other South American nations by increasing support for Rosas and his regime. The day was enacted as a national observance in 1974, following a request from the revisionist historian José María Rosa, and promoted into a national holiday in 2010.

== History ==
José María Rosa was the first one to make reference to November 20 as the Argentine's National Sovereignty day. It was in 1950, during the second administration of Juan Domingo Perón. The Peronist government did not endorse openly the historical revisionism of the history of Argentina (which sought to modify the mainstream perspectives over Juan Manuel de Rosas), but it allowed public manifestations of it. Perón himself admired Rosas and the battle of Vuelta de Obligado since his time in the military school, but did not engage in the historiographical controversy during his presidency: he maintained that "I have enough problems with living people, to fight with dead people as well". The Rosist revisionism was forbidden during the peronist proscription of the Revolución Libertadora. The first official mention to the date was done by the governor of Buenos Aires province Carlos Aloé in 1953.

In 1954 José María Rosa and Ernesto Palacio created the "Popular organization for the repatriation of the remains of General Rosas". Rosas died in 1877 in Southampton, and his body hadn't been returned to Argentina. Law 20.769 was proposed to both repatriate the body of Rosas and create a Day of National Sovereignty by Senator Cornejo Linares. The proposal was approved on November 14, 1973, by the Senate. It was approved with amendments by the Chamber of Deputies, and returned to the Senate. The new version did not include the new observance but just the repatriation. As a result, deputy Gallo proposed a new law, law 20.770, specifically for the new observance. Both laws were approved on September 25 and 26, 1974. Law 20.770 was promulgated by executive power the following October 3.

In 2010, year of the Argentina Bicentennial, president Cristina Fernández de Kirchner, who openly supports the Argentine historical revisionism, made a new proposal to increase the number of holidays in Argentina. One of the proposals was to turn the Day of National Sovereignty into a national holiday, instead of just an observance. The proposal was later promulgated by a Necessity and Urgency Decree on November 3.

== First celebration ==
The new holiday was first celebrated in 2010 at Obligado, the site of the battle, in an act with the presence of the president, revisionist historian Pacho O'Donnell and other politicians. The celebration included the inauguration of a monument of the event, created by Rogelio Polesello.

The Radical Civic Union (UCR) was Rosist at its early times, and praised the ideas of the old federalists. The colours of the shield, red and white, reflect that affiliation: federalists wore red badges, and white is the colour of the White Party from Uruguay (the modern National Party), of Rosas' ally Manuel Oribe. The UCR distanced from those ideas in later years, embracing the anti-rosist historiography instead. For this reason, some people was surprised by the presence of Leopoldo Moreau, one of the leaders of the UCR, among the invited guests.

The new holiday did not generate any political controversy.
