= Carlos Morel (painter) =

Argentine painter (1813–1894)

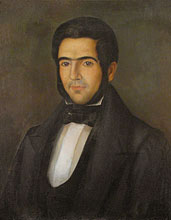
- Portrait in oils c.1838 by Fernando García del Molino
- Born: 12 February 1813; Buenos Aires
- Died: 10 September 1894 (aged 81); Quilmes

Carlos Morel (12 February 1813 – 10 September 1894) was a prominent Argentine painter in the nineteenth century, known as the first truly Argentine painter.

== Early years ==
Carlos Morel was born in Buenos Aires on 12 February 1813, the son of José María Morel y Pérez and Juliana Miró. His father was a wealthy Spanish merchant and his mother was daughter of a customs official. His father died on 6 June 1825. Carlos and his brother Estanislao both entered their late father's business at an early age.

Morel entered the art school of the University of Buenos Aires in 1827, studying under the Swiss José Guth, and graduating in 1830 at the age of seventeen. He then spent another year under the Italian Pablo Caccianiga. One of his classmates was Fernando García del Molino, who later helped him on some of his works. In 1830 his mother married the Italian painter Cayetano Descalzi, (Note: Some of the work by Morel's stepfather, Cayetano (or Gaetano) Descalzi, has survived, including an 1841 oil painting of Governor Juan Manuel de Rosas.) then legally separated from him eight years later. Descalzi may have also instructed Morel.

As early as 1837 Morel was described as a promising young painter by Marcos Sastre in his speech opening the literary salon. Morel painted a variety of subjects including portraits, miniatures, genre scenes and battle scenes. His first lithograph, The Descent dates to 1836. He became one of the masters of this medium, with works that excel in composition such as Buenos Aires Cathedral, Startled Horse, Cuirassiers and Cavalry.

== Brazil ==
Morel sailed from Buenos Aires on 22 February 1842 bound for Rio de Janeiro. That city was going through a cultural revival at that time, home to artists who had left France after the restoration of the absolute monarchy, encouraged by the Emperor Pedro II of Brazil. In Rio he learned the daguerreotype technique, which had been invented in 1839. At that time Prilidiano Pueyrredón was living in Rio with his family, as well as other intellectuals opposed to the regime of Juan Manuel de Rosas including Bernardino Rivadavia, José María Gutiérrez and Juan Bautista Alberdi. His brother-in-law José María Dupuy was arrested and killed during disturbances in Buenos Aires in April 1842. Soon after hearing of his death, Morel made a miniature portrait of Dupuy.

== Later years ==
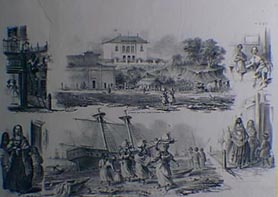
View of a house by a river

Morel returned to Buenos Aires in 1844, and in 1845 published his famous album of lithographs called "Manners and Customs of the Río de la Plata". During the years after 1844 his work declined in quality. His Combate de los bajíos de Arregui appeared in 1848 and then no other works are known until 1870. (Note: Some sources say that Morel suffered from a mental breakdown, but the evidence does not support this.) He moved to the home of his half sister, Indalecia Morel Dupuy de Dupuy, in 1870. She had been running a bakery in Buenos Aires to make a living after the murder of her husband, and had moved to Quilmes in 1853 after his expropriated property had been returned. She died in 1879.

An 1870 Quilmes business directory lists Morel as a photographer. Most of the paintings from his last years were about religious subjects. In 1877 he made an altarpiece for the church of Quilmes. Carlos Morel died in Quilmes, Buenos Aires Province, Argentina on 10 September 1894, aged 81. The "Carlos Morel School of Fine Arts" in Quilmes is named in his honor. His remains lie in the cemetery of the town.

== Work ==
Morel's more notable portrait subjects included Florencio Escardó and Patricio Peralta Ramos. He painted miniatures, including ones of General Juan Manuel de Rosas and his wife Encarnación Ezcurra. He also made genre scenes, battle scenes and later painted religious subjects, which are not considered his best work. He is best known for his lithographs. His most famous work is a series of 24 plates called "Manners and Customs of the Rio de la Plata", published in 1845. They were published in two volumes each with twelve plates.

Morel illustrated the streets of Buenos Aires, the grocery stores, the gauchos and other characters from the early years of Argentina. The genius of Morel, for the first time in Argentine, was to leave the picturesque tradition of European travelers, some of whom were technically more gifted than him, to uncover the essence of the Pampean environment.

== Gallery ==
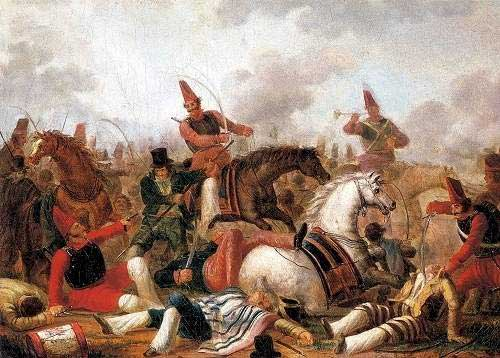
Cavalry fight in the age of Rosas (c. 1840)

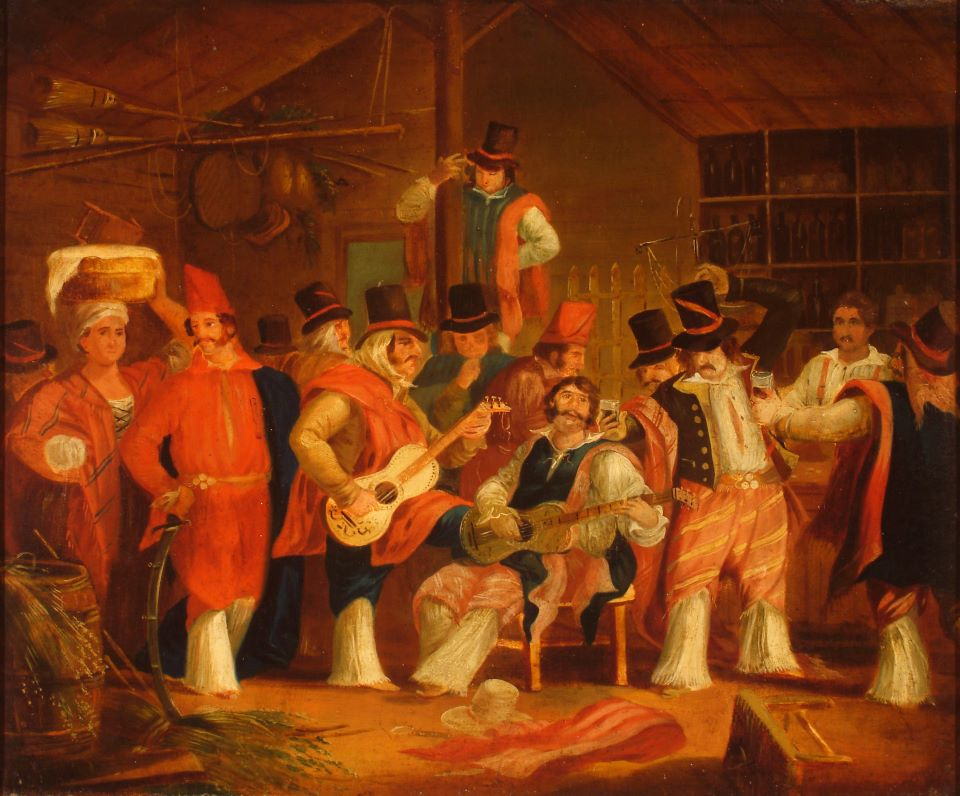
Payada in a store

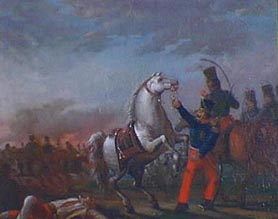
Federal army cavalry charge (1830)

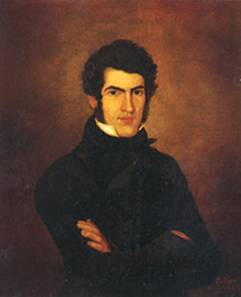
Portrait of Florencio Escardó (1840)

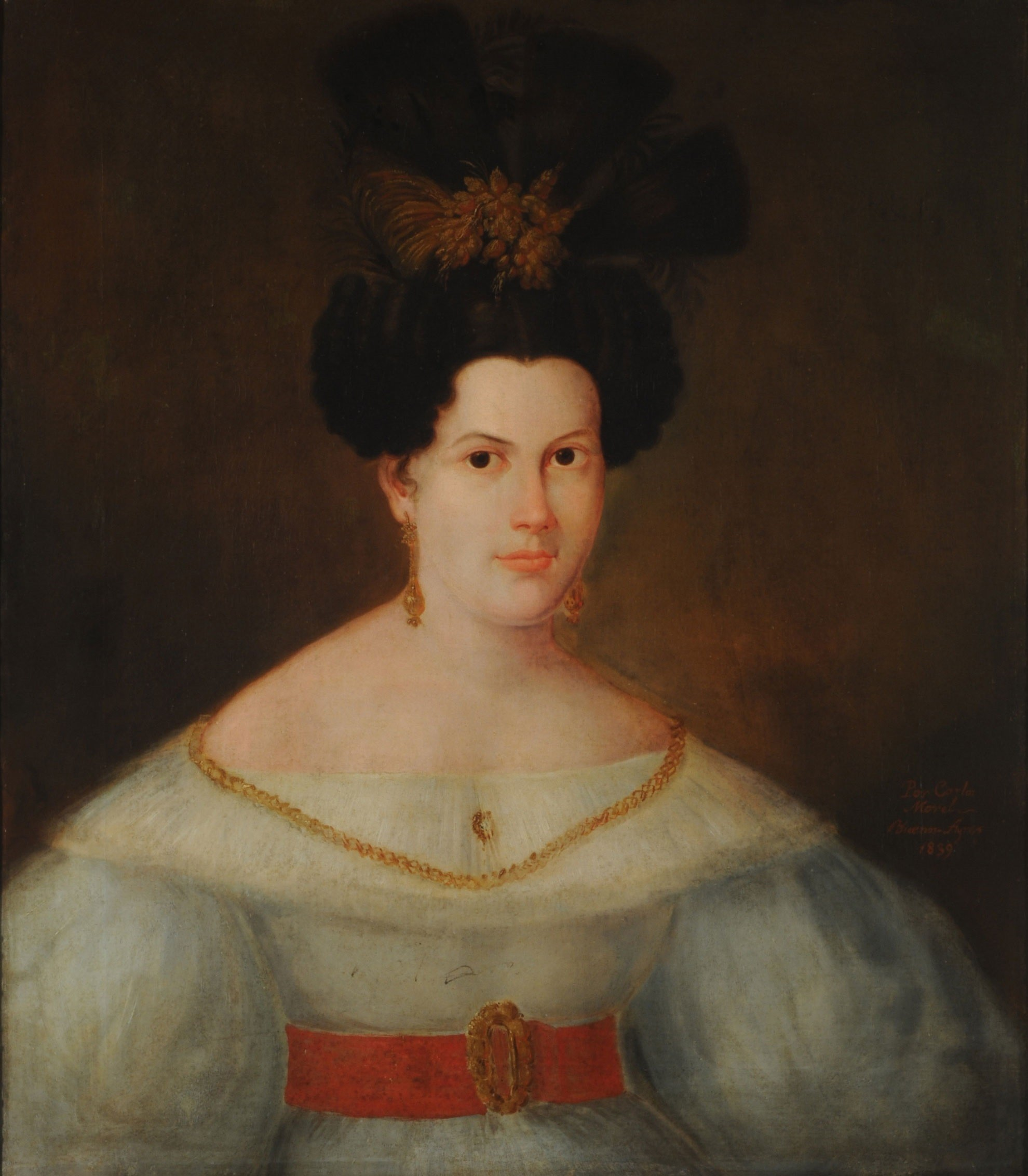
Portrait of Macedonia Escardó (1839)
