= HMS Dolphin (1836) =

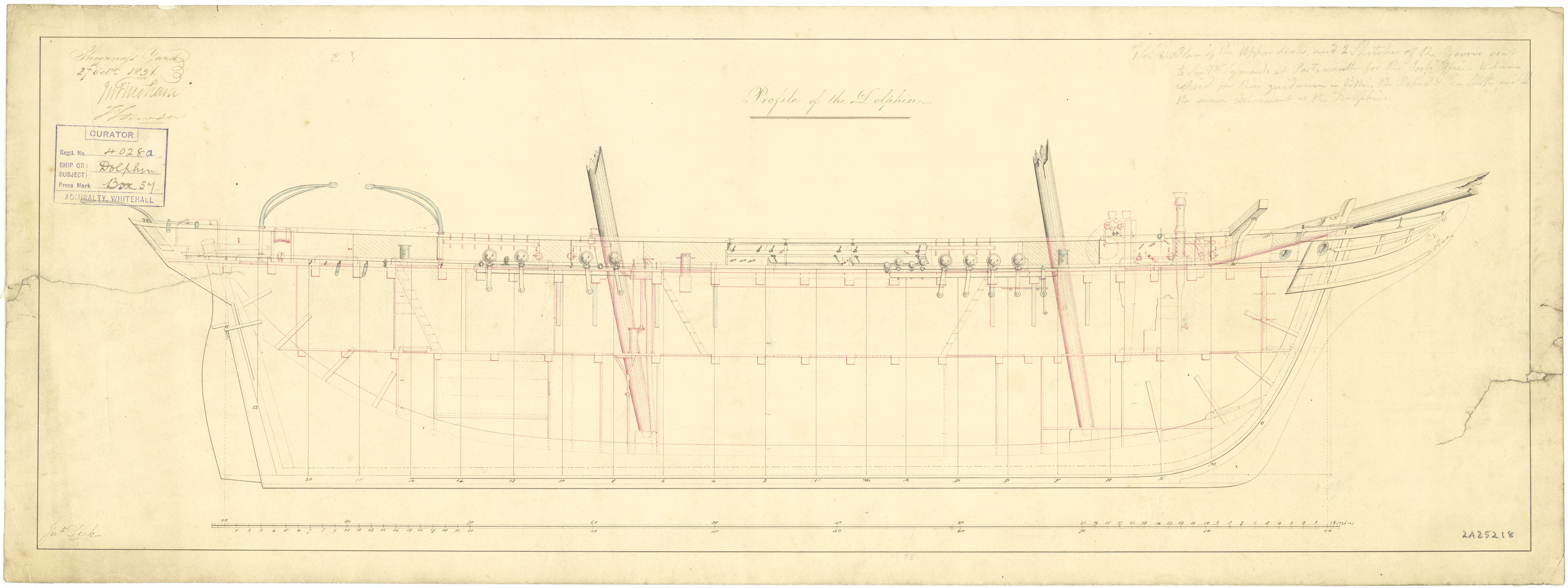
- Drawing of the profile of the Dolphin, from the archives of the Royal Museums Greenwich

History
- Launched: 1836
- Decommissioned: 1861
- Fate: Sold in 1894

General characteristics
- Complement: 33
- Armament: 1 × 32-pdr, 2 × 32-pdr carronades

HMS Dolphin was a 3-gun packet brigantine ship of the Royal Navy, launched in 1836.

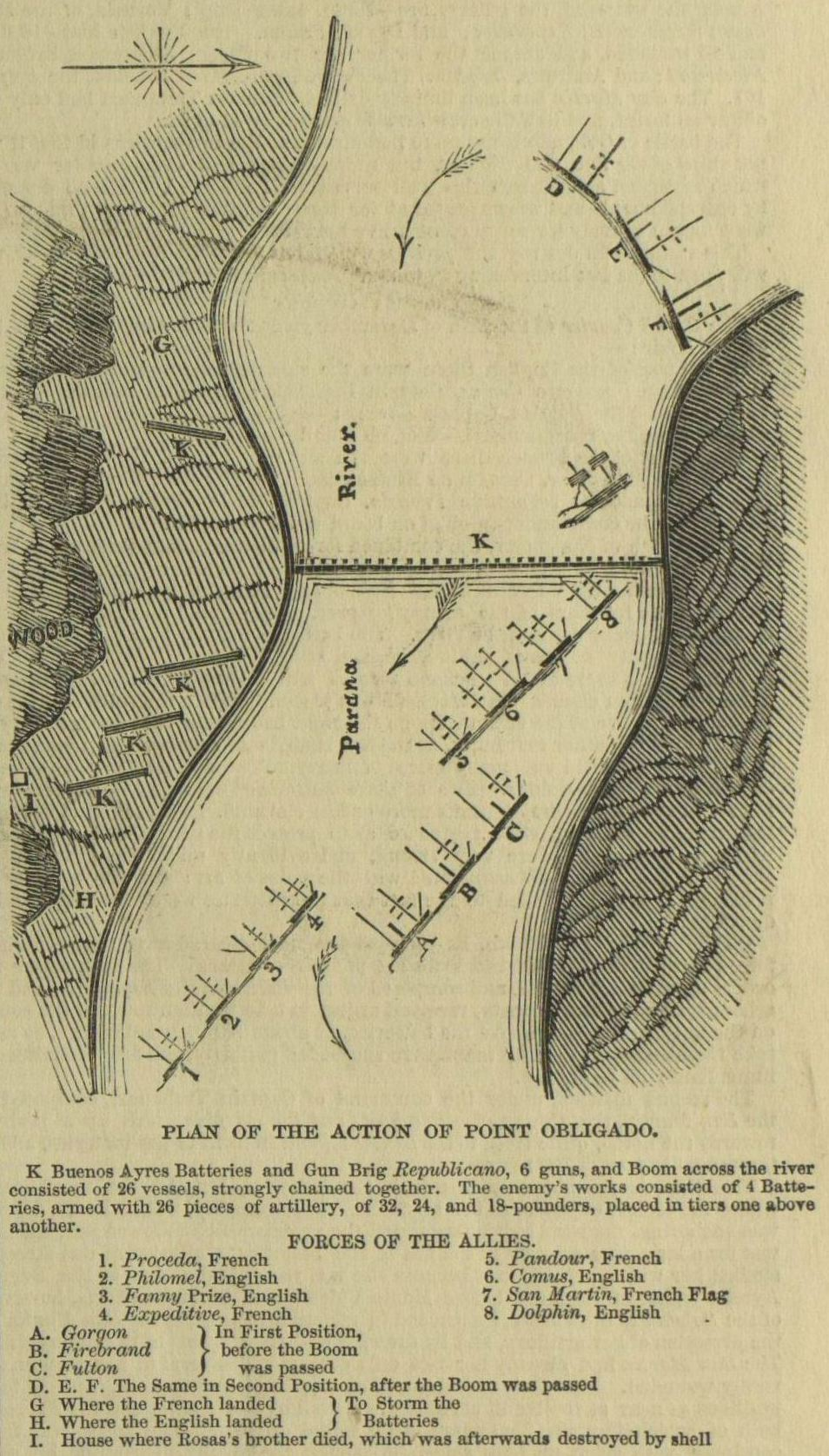
Dolphin during the action of Point Obligado in 1846

She participated in the Battle of Vuelta de Obligado. It was decommissioned in 1861 and sold in 1894.

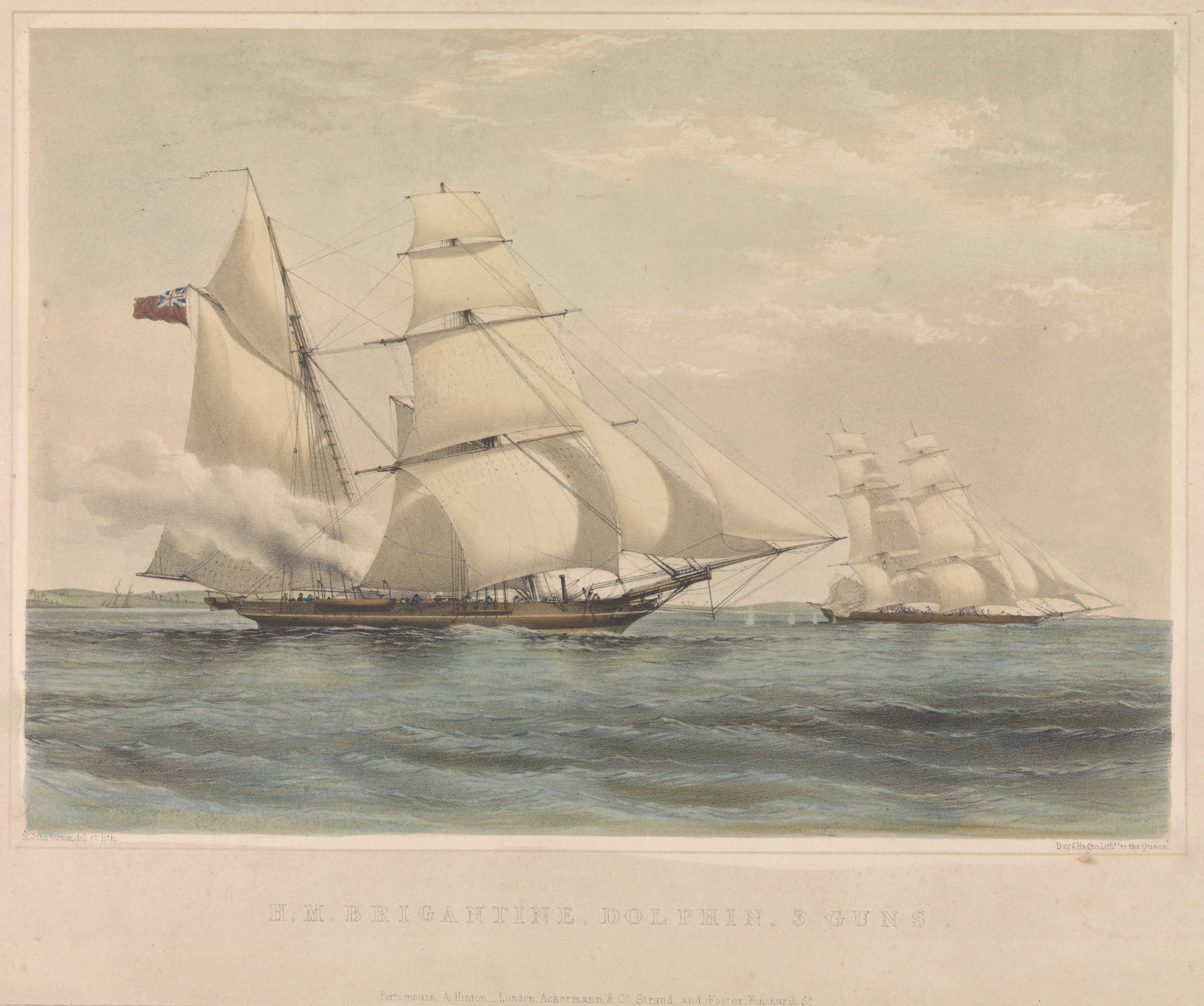
Dolphin firing at a slaver off the coast of Africa, by H. John Vernon, a print, c. 1853
