= Battle of Vuelta de Obligado =

Battle of the Anglo-French blockade of the Rio de la Plata

- Part of the Anglo-French blockade of the Río de la Plata
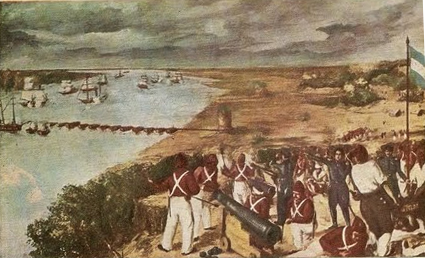
- Argentine forces on the riverbank attacking the Anglo-French force
Date	20 November 1845
Location	Paraná River, along San Pedro, Buenos Aires Province, Argentina 33°35′32″S 59°48′26″W
Result	See aftermath

Belligerents
Argentina	France; United Kingdom

Commanders and leaders
Lucio Mansilla; Francisco Crespo	François Tréhouart; Samuel Inglefield

Strength
2,160 men 4 coastal batteries 1 brigantine 2 gunboats	11 warships

Casualties and losses
150 killed 90 wounded 1 brigantine lost 21 cannons 20 barges	28 killed 95 wounded Multiple warships damaged, forcing emergency repairs.

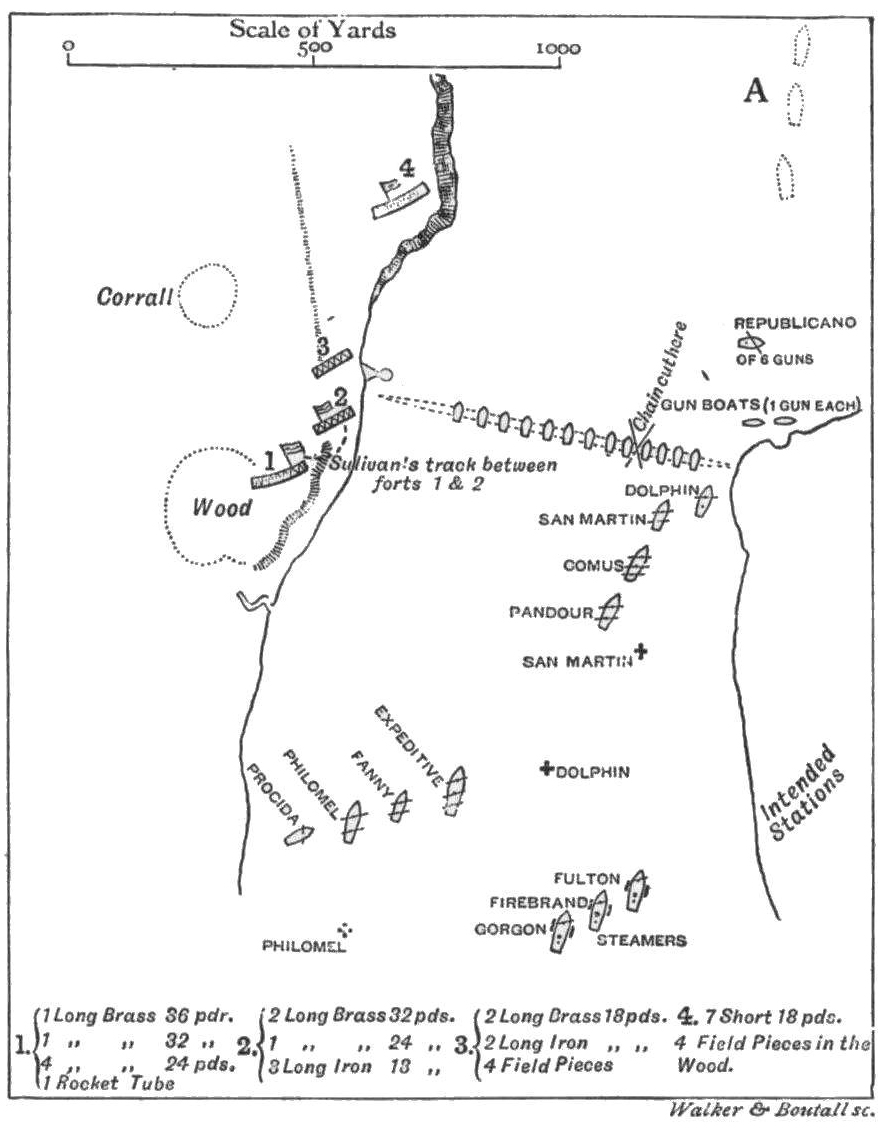
Plan of the battle

The Battle of Vuelta de Obligado took place on 20 November 1845, in the waters of the Paraná River, on its right bank and in the north of the province of Buenos Aires (Argentina), in a bend where the river narrows and turns, known as Vuelta de Obligado, in what is today the town of Obligado, in San Pedro district.

It was a confrontation between the province of Buenos Aires, governed by Brigadier Juan Manuel de Rosas – who appointed General Lucio Norberto Mansilla as commander of the defense forces – and the Anglo-French squadron, whose intervention was carried out under the pretext of achieving pacification in the face of the problems existing between Buenos Aires and Montevideo. The Europeans intended to establish direct trade relations between Britain and France with the provinces of Santa Fe, Entre Ríos and Corrientes, without going through Buenos Aires or recognizing Rosas' authority as the person in charge of foreign relations for the Argentine Confederation.

== Background ==
During the 1830s and 1840s, the British and the French governments were at odds with Juan Manuel de Rosas's leadership of the Argentine Confederation. Rosas's economic policies of requiring trade to pass through the Buenos Aires custom house, which was his method of imposing his will on the Littoral provinces, combined with his attempts to incorporate Paraguay and Uruguay to the confederation, were in conflict with French and British economic interests in the region. During his government, Rosas had to face numerous problems with those foreign powers, which in some cases reached levels of open confrontation. The incidents included two naval blockades: the French blockade in 1838 and the Anglo-French of 1845.

With the development of steam-powered sailing, which mainly took place in Britain, France, and the United States, in the third decade of the 19th century, large and thus ocean-going merchant and military ships became capable of sailing up rivers at good speeds and with heavy loads.

Rosas's government tried to stop the practice by declaring the Argentine rivers closed to foreign shipping and barring access to Paraguay and other ports in the process. The British and the French governments did not acknowledge that declaration and decided to defy Rosas by sailing upstream with a joint fleet, which set the stage for the battle.

== Battle ==
=== Order of battle ===
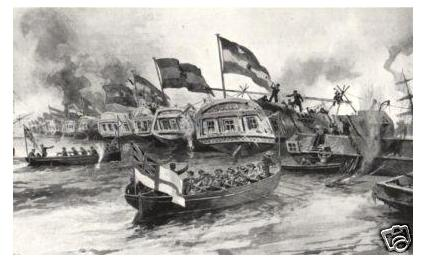
British and French boats assaulting the chain line at Obligado

The Anglo-French squadron that was sailing through the Paraná River in the first days of November was composed of eleven warships:

- British
  - Gorgon, paddle (six guns, Capt. Charles Hotham)
  - Firebrand, paddle (six guns, Capt. James Hope)
  - Philomel (eight guns, Commander Bartholomew James Sulivan)
  - Comus (eighteen guns, Commander Edward Augustus Inglefield (acting))
  - Dolphin (three guns, Lieut. Reginald Thomas John Levinge)
  - Fanny, schooner (one gun, Lieut. Astley Cooper Key)
- French
  - San Martin (eight guns, Capt. François Thomas Tréhouart)
  - Fulton, paddle (two guns, Lieut. Louis Mazères)
  - Expéditive (sixteen guns, Lieut. Miniac)
  - Pandour (ten guns, Lieut. Duparc)
  - Procida (four guns, Lieut. de La Rivière)

The ships were among the most advanced military machinery of their time, and at least three (Fulton, HMS Firebrand and HMS Gorgon) were steamers, which initially stayed behind the sailing vessels. They were partially armoured and had rapid-fire guns and Congreve rockets.

The main Argentine redoubt was located on a cliff rising between 30 and 180 m over the banks at Vuelta de Obligado, where the river was 700 m wide, and a turn made navigation difficult.

Argentine General Lucio N. Mansilla, the commander of the confederation forces, and Rosas's brother-in-law, set up three thick metal chains suspended from 24 boats completely across the river, to prevent the advance of the allied fleet. The operation was under the charge of the Italian immigrant Filipo Aliberti. Only three of the boats were naval vessels; the rest were requisitioned barges whose owners received a compensation in case of loss. Aliberti was the master of one of the boats, the Jacoba, that was sunk in the battle. At least 20 boats and barges were lost in the chain barrage at Obligado.

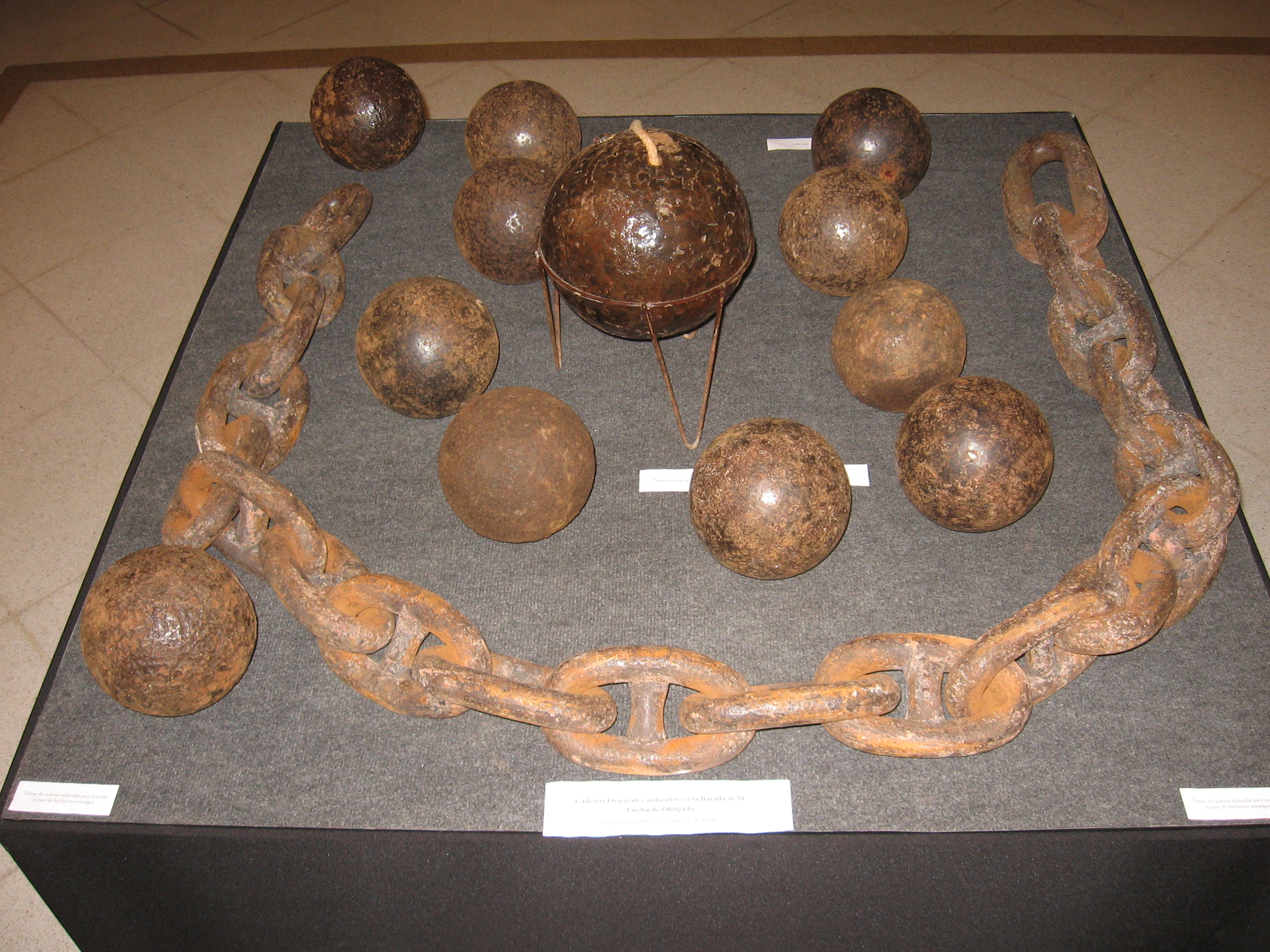
Chain links and ammunition used by the Argentine forces during the battle

On the right shore of the river, the Argentines mounted four batteries with 30 cannons, many of them bronze 8, 10, 12 and 20-pounders. They were served by a division of 160 gaucho soldiers. There were also 2,000 men in trenches under the command of Colonel Ramón Rodríguez, together with the brigantine Republicano and two small gunboats, Restaurador and Lagos, with the mission of guarding the chains across the river. Some sources increase the Argentine naval power to a third gunboat, the unarmed brigantine Vigilante, whose artillery had been dismounted and transferred to one of the batteries, eight armed launches and at least five armed barges.

=== Main action ===
The combat began at dawn, with intense cannon fire and rocket discharges over the Argentine batteries, which had less accurate and slower loading cannons. From the beginning the Argentines suffered many casualties: 150 dead and 90 wounded. Furthermore, the barges that held the chains were burnt down, and the Republicano was blown up by its own commander when he was unable to defend it any longer. A number of armed launches were also sunk in battle. The gunboats Restaurador and Lagos disengaged successfully and withdrew upriver, towards Tonelero Pass. The third gunboat and the armed barges also survived the action, but the dismantled brigantine Vigilante was scuttled by its crew, and the remaining launches were destroyed by the combined fleet on 28 November.

Shortly afterwards, the French steamer Fulton sailed through a gap open in the chain's barrier. Disembarked troops overcame the last defenders of the bluff, and 21 cannons fell into the hands of the allied forces.

The Europeans had won free passage at the cost of 28 dead and 95 wounded. However, their ships suffered severe damage, which stranded them at Obligado for 40 days to make emergency repairs.

=== Secondary action ===
Meanwhile, 40 km to the north, a small Argentine naval force composed of the sloop Chacabuco, the gunboats Carmen, Arroyo Grande, Apremio, and Buena Vista kept watch over a secondary branch of the Paraná whose control gives full access to the ports of Entre Ríos. Like at Obligado, a double chain, held by seven barges, was also deployed across the river. When news of the battle's outcome reached the squadron, the Chacabuco was scuttled, and the remainder of the flotilla took shelter in the port of Victoria.

=== Upstream ===
Only 50 out of 92 merchantmen awaiting at Ibicuy Islands continued their upriver trip. The rest gave up and returned to Montevideo. The British and the French ships that sailed past upriver were again attacked on their way back at Paso del Tonelero and at Angostura del Quebracho. The combined fleet suffered the loss of six merchant ships during the later engagement, on 4 June 1846.

== Aftermath ==
The Anglo-French victory did not achieve the Allies' goal. The severe damage to their naval forces and the loss of merchantmen indicated that it would be too costly to sail Argentine rivers without the authorisation of the Argentine authorities.

France and the United Kingdom eventually lifted the blockade and dropped their attempts to bypass Buenos Aires policies. They acknowledged Argentina's legal right over the Paraná and other internal rivers and its authority to determine who had access to it in exchange for the withdrawal of Rosas's army from Uruguay.

The Battle of Obligado is remembered in Argentina on 20 November, which was declared "Day of National Sovereignty" in 1974 and became a national holiday in 2010. The Paris Métro had a station named Obligado for this battle until 1947, when it was renamed Argentine as a goodwill gesture after the visit of Eva Perón to France that year.

== Consequences ==
Since the Anglo-French victory turned out to be pyrrhic: both the decision of the defending forces and the complications that the winding course of the Paraná imposed – and still imposes today – on navigation, made it excessively costly to try again to navigate it against the will of the Buenos Aires government.

The battle was widely publicised throughout the Americas. Chile and Brazil, which until then had been hostile to Rosas, changed their feelings and turned momentarily to the cause of the Argentine Confederation. Even some Unitarians, traditional enemies of Rosas, were moved and Colonel Martiniano Chilavert offered to join the army of the Confederation.

The General José de San Martín (1778–1850) expressed from his exile in France to his friend Tomás Guido:

I already knew about Obligado's action; what an inequity! In any case, the interveners will have seen from this demonstration that Argentines are not empanadas that can be eaten with no more work than opening their mouths. To such a course of action we have no other choice but not to look to the future and to fulfil our duty as free men, whatever fate may be in store for us, which in my intimate conviction would not be for a moment doubtful in our favour if all Argentines were persuaded of the dishonour that will befall our homeland if the European nations triumph in this contest, which in my opinion is as important as that of our emancipation from Spain.

— José de San Martín (1778–1850)

This battle – despite being a tactical defeat – resulted in a diplomatic victory for the Argentine Confederation, due to the high cost of the operation. Implicitly, the resistance put up by the Argentine government forced the invaders to accept Argentine sovereignty over the inland rivers. Britain, with the Arana-Southern Treaty of 1847, brought this conflict to a definitive end and in March of that year ordered the withdrawal of its fleet. France took another year, until the Arana-Lepredour Treaty was signed.

These treaties recognised the navigation of the Paraná River as an internal navigation of the Argentine Confederation and subject only to its laws and regulations, as well as that of the Uruguay River in common with the Eastern State.

== Sources ==
- Marley, David (1998), Wars of the Americas: a chronology of armed conflict in the New World, 1492 to the present, ABC-CLIO, ISBN 0-87436-837-5.
- Mansilla, Lucio Victorio (1994), Mis memorias y otros escritos [My memories and other writings] (in Spanish), Secretaría de Cultura de la Nación; Lugar Editorial, ISBN 950-9129-91-7.
- De León, Pablo (2008), Historia de la Actividad Espacial en la Argentina [History of the spatial activity in Argentina] (in Spanish), Lulu, ISBN 978-0-557-01782-9.
- Chapman, J (1889), The Westminster Review, vol. 131.
