= Mancilla (surname) =

Mancilla is a Spanish surname. Notable people with the surname include:

- Alicia Mancilla (born 1999), Guatemalan swimmer
- Eder Mancilla (born 1986), Venezuelan football manager
- Harrinson Mancilla (born 1991), Colombian footballer
- Héctor Mancilla (born 1980), Chilean footballer
- Horacio Mancilla, Mexican voice-over, dubbing actor and writer
- José Carrillo Mancilla (born 1995), Spanish footballer
- Luis Argel Mancilla (born 1959), Argentine skier
- Nicolás Mancilla (born 1993), Chilean footballer
- Niusha Mancilla (born 1971), Bolivian former middle and long-distance runner
- Patricia Mancilla (born 1966), Bolivian politician
- Sebastian Mancilla Olivares (1956–2009), Chilean writer, director, and playwright
- Sergio Mancilla Zayas (born 1971), Mexican politician
- Víctor Mancilla (1921–2011), Chilean footballer

== See also ==
- Mansilla (surname)
- Candelario Mancilla, a small settlement in the Aysén Region, Chile
- César Mancillas Amador (born 1958), Mexican politician
- Jorge Luis Mancillas Ramírez, Mexican jurist
