= Lucio Norberto Mansilla =

Argentine soldier and politician

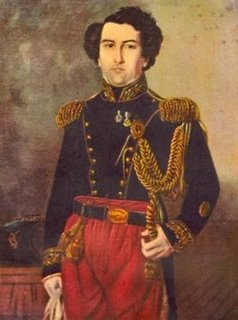
- Portrait by Jean Philippe Goulu (1786-1853), currently located at the National Historical Museum (Argentina)

Governor of Entre Ríos Province
- In office September 28, 1821 – February 12, 1824
- Preceded by: None
- Succeeded by: Juan León Sola

Personal details
- Born: March 4, 1792 Buenos Aires
- Died: April 10, 1871 (aged 82) Buenos Aires
- Party: Federal
- Other political affiliations: Patriot
- Spouse(s): Poloña Durante, Agustina Ortiz de Rozas
- Profession: Military

Military service
- Allegiance: (Spain) Viceroyalty of the Río de la Plata (1806–1807) (Argentina) United Provinces of the Río de la Plata; Argentine Confederation
- Years of service: 1806–1807/1810–1871
- Rank: General
- Battles/wars: Battle of Vuelta de Obligado

Lucio Norberto Mansilla (April 2, 1789 – April 10, 1871) was an Argentine military officer, surveyor and politician who played a prominent role in the Argentine War of Independence, the Cisplatine War and the Anglo-French blockade of the Río de la Plata. He was the first governor of the Entre Ríos Province. Although he commanded several units in many battles, he is most renowned for commanding the Argentine forces in the battle of Vuelta de Obligado on the Paraná River during the Anglo-French blockade of the Río de la Plata.

== Early life ==
Lucio Mansilla was born in Buenos Aires on April 2, 1789, son of Andrés Ximénez de Mansilla and Eduarda María Bravo. Lucio Mansilla was the 7th generation of the Mansilla family living in the Americas. His father was one of the most valiant defenders of the city of Buenos Aires during the first British invasion in 1806 and tragically died in 1807 during the second British invasion, during the British invasions of the River Plate.

Lucio began his military career in 1806, during the British invasions of the Río de la Plata, under the command of Santiago de Liniers. He was part of the Tercio de Gallegos regiment. He also fought in the 1807 invasions, in the combat of Miserere on June 2, and the actions of July 5 and 6. The Buenos Aires Cabildo allowed him to run a math school in 1809.

Mansilla, a widower, married Juan Manuel de Rosas' sister, Agustina Ortiz de Rozas. They had six children: Lucio Victorio Mansilla, Eduarda, Lucio Norberto, Agustina and Carlos.

In 1809, he was appointed as a licensed surveyor by Viceroy Liniers after passing an expert examination. That same year, with his surveyor’s title, he applied to the Cabildo (municipal council) and obtained permission to open and manage a rudimentary mathematics school.

When the May Revolution of 1810 occurred, he joined the movement. In his memoirs, he wrote:

""…at the cry of FREEDOM, I took up my sword, abandoning the promising future and social position I had obtained, and I placed myself at the service of my homeland."

By 1812, now holding the rank of lieutenant, he fought under the command of General José Gervasio Artigas in the campaign against Portuguese forces that had invaded the region. Later, he joined José Rondeau in the siege and eventual liberation of the fortified city of Montevideo, the capital of the Banda Oriental, which was under royalist control.

== War of independence ==
Mansilla joined the forces of José Gervasio Artigas in 1812, against the Portuguese armies summoned by the royalist Javier de Elío. When Artigas left the siege of Montevideo before the Second Banda Oriental campaign, he joined José Rondeau.

In 1813, he fought under Colonel Domingo French in the campaign to attack the fortress known as "El Quilombo," located on the banks of the Yaguarón River (now on the Brazil border). In the assault, carried out on May 12, he was severely wounded by a musket ball that passed through his body. Due to his bravery, the government publicly acknowledged his distinction, publishing it in La Gaceta on June 5, 1813. Once recovered from his wounds, he returned to the siege army and served until the royalist capitulation on July 23, 1814. For his actions during the siege, he was honored by the government with a silver shield and the title of "Distinguished Patriot in Heroic Degree.".

He joined the Army of the Andes in 1814, and fought in the battles of Chacabuco and Talcahuano, under the command of José de San Martín. He also fought the decisive battle of Maipú under the command of Juan Gregorio de Las Heras. He was rewarded by both Argentina and Chile for his actions, and returned to Buenos Aires.

== Entre Ríos ==
Francisco Ramírez called Mansilla to mediate between him and Artigas. When Artigas invaded Entre Ríos, he joined forces with Ramírez against him. He had an important role at the battle of Las Tunas. The conflict between Ramírez and Artigas led to the exile of Artigas in Paraguay. Ramírez declared the independence of the Republic of Entre Ríos and incorporated Corrientes and Misiones to it. Mansilla opposed these actions, and denied the help of his army. Ramírez died in an ambush, and the Republic of Entre Ríos was abolished and reincorporated into Argentina. Mansilla was appointed governor, as he was the commander of the only military unit in the area. He ended the hostilities between Entre Ríos and the Santa Fe Province. He ruled for three years and signed the Quadrilateral Treaty.

== War with Brazil ==
Mansilla became a general in 1826, and marched to the Argentine-Brazilian War under the command of Carlos María de Alvear, operating at Rio Grande Do Sul. He led the siege of Montevideo, and played an important role in the Battle of Camacuã. He was defeated in the Battle of Umbu, and fought in the battle of Ituzaingó.

== Civil War ==
Mansilla refused to join the coup of Juan Lavalle against the governor Manuel Dorrego in 1828. Lavalle was ousted from power some time later, and Juan José Viamonte appointed him head of the police of Buenos Aires, once the Federals returned to power. He joined the military again with the War of the Confederation, and moved to Tucumán. He did not take action during the campaign of Lavalle against Juan Manuel de Rosas during the French blockade of the Río de la Plata, because Rosas was his brother-in-law (Mansilla married the sister of Rosas, Marina Agustina Dominga del Corazón de Jesús Ortiz de Rozas y López de Osornio on April 2, 1831) and Lavalle his comrade in arms during the War of Brazil.

== Anglo-French blockade of the Río de la Plata ==
Britain and France began a war against Argentina, on behalf of the Colorados of Uruguay, as Argentina supported in Blancos in the Uruguayan Civil War. An Anglo-French navy sought to navigate the Paraná River, and Mansilla was appointed to the defense. He prepared the defense at Vuelta de Obligado, closing the river with chains, and prepared several artilleries, defended by 2000 men. However, the artillery had a lower range, precision and reload speed than the cannons of the ships. The battle of Vuelta de Obligado harmed a number of ships, but the navy prevailed after a couple of hours. Mansilla led a charge against French soldiers that tried to land and dismantle the artillery, being hurt in the chest and leaving Juan Bautista Thorne in command. The Argentine cavalry forced the French to return to their ships, but a second attack by both French and British had better success. The battle ended with 250 deaths and 400 injured for Argentina, and 26 deaths and 86 injured for the Anglo-French navy.

Mansilla prepared a new resistance at Quebracho, when the navy attempted to return to Montevideo. This attack gave serious damage to the ships.

Mansilla died in Buenos Aires on April 10, 1871, during an epidemic of Yellow Fever in the city.

== Bibliography ==
- Launay, Luis (2011). Lucio Norberto Mansilla: El héroe de Obligado. Buenos Aires: Fabro. ISBN 978-987-1677-41-2.
