= Cayetano Descalzi =

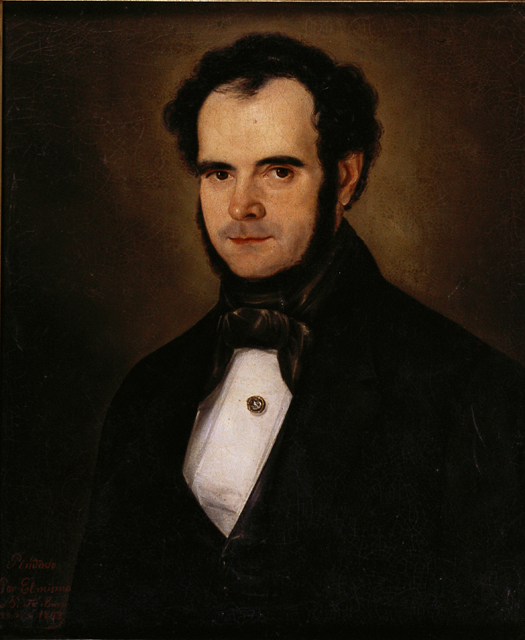
- Self portrait - 1843
- Born: 1809
- Died: 1886 (aged 76–77)

Cayetano Descalzi (or Gaetano Descalzi) (1809–1886) was an Italian painter and engraver who came to the Río de la Plata, now Argentina, in the 1820s.

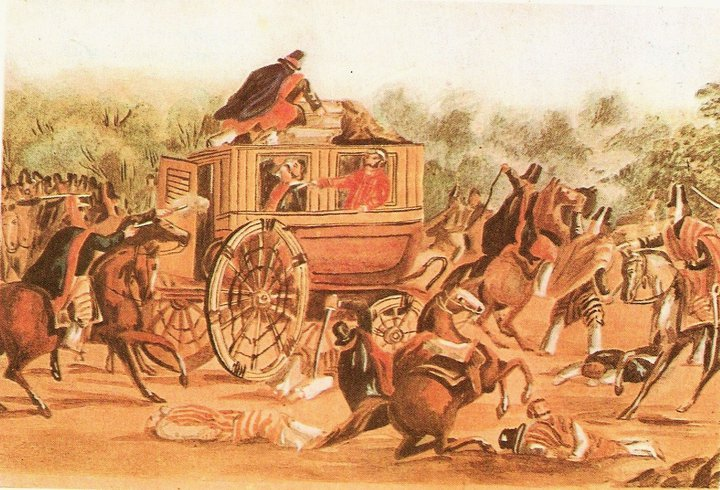
Muerte de Quiroga

In 1830, Descalzi married Juliana Miró, the widowed mother of Carlos Morel, who was also to become a celebrated artist. They legally separated eight years later.

Descalzi is recognized for his oil lithograph of Governor Juan Manuel de Rosas, made in 1841, entitled "Rosas, el Grande", printed the following year by Lemercier of París. He also made the portrait of the magistrate Don Tomas Giráldez in Quilmes. One of his pupils was Cándido López (1840-1902).

== Gallery ==
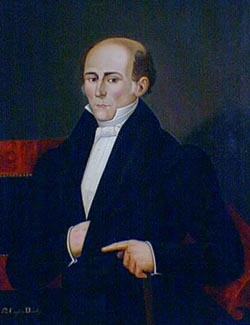
Tomás Giráldez y Giráldez, c. 1840

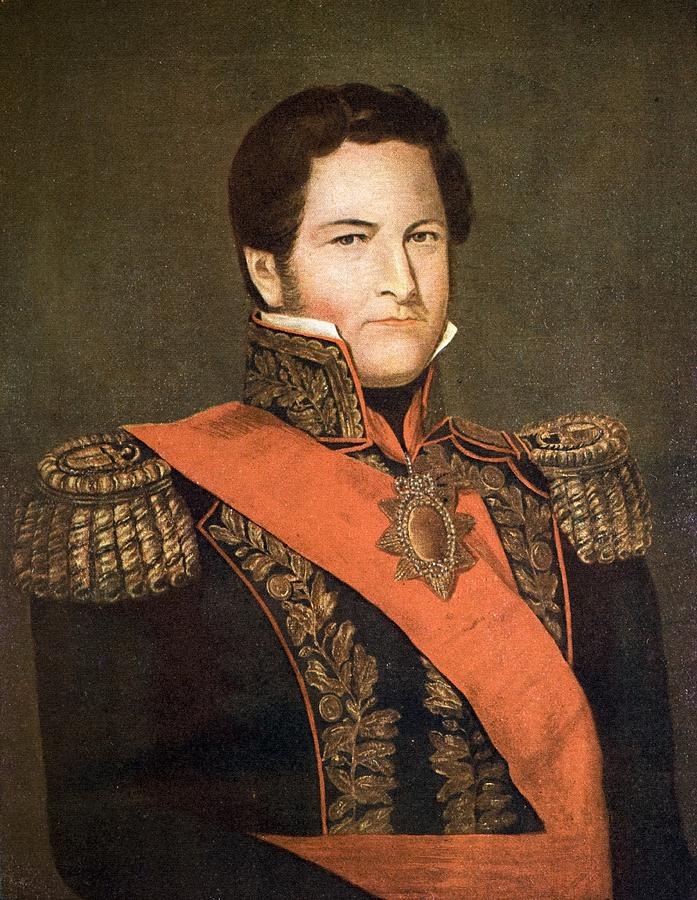
Juan Manuel de Rosas, governor of Buenos Aires province in Argentina

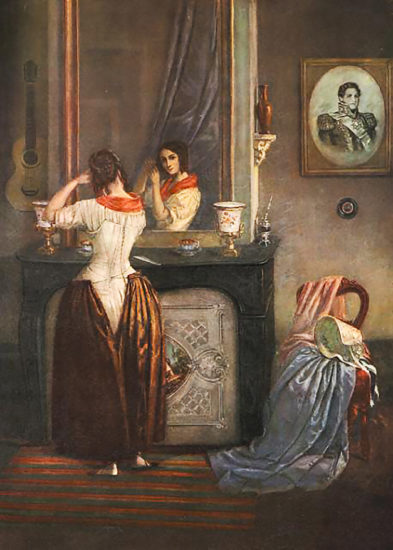
Boudoir federal, c. 1845. Note portrait of Rosas on the wall.

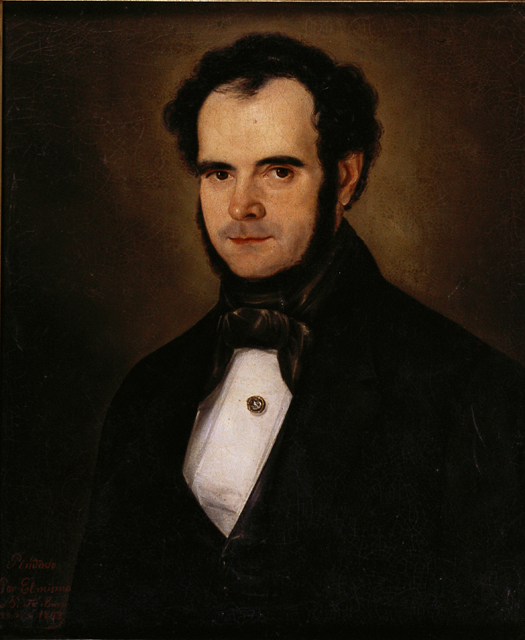
Autorretrato
