= Henry Southern (journalist) =

English journalist and diplomat

Henry Southern (1799–1853) was an English journalist and diplomat, best known as the founder of the Retrospective Review.

== Early life ==
Born in York, he was the son of Richard Southern. He entered Trinity College, Cambridge, on 31 December 1814, graduated B.A. in 1819 and proceeded M.A. in 1822. He became a member of the Middle Temple, but was not called to the bar.

== Journalist ==
Interested in early English literature, Southern in 1820 founded the Retrospective Review, which he edited on his own till 1826, by which time 14 volumes had been published. Between 1826 and 1828 two more were issued by him with Nicholas Harris Nicolas. The Review provided criticisms on "scarce old books", mainly of the sixteenth and seventeenth centuries. Two more volumes of another series of the title were published in 1853–4.

When Jeremy Bentham founded the Westminster Review in 1824, Southern was for a time co-editor with John Bowring; and in 1825 he became proprietor and editor of the second series of the later London Magazine. He was also a contributor to The Atlas at its beginning, and to The Spectator and The Examiner.

== Diplomat ==
In 1833 Southern accompanied the English ambassador, George William Frederick Villiers to Spain as his private secretary. He was then placed on the diplomatic staff, and, after remaining some years at Madrid, was appointed secretary to the legation at Lisbon.

In 1848 Southern became minister to the Argentine Confederation, and in 1851 was promoted to the court of Brazil, and received the insignia of a Companion of the Bath. He died at Rio de Janeiro on 28 January 1853.

== Notes ==
Attribution

This article incorporates text from a publication now in the public domain: Lee, Sidney, ed. (1898). "Southern, Henry". Dictionary of National Biography. Vol. 53. London: Smith, Elder & Co.
