= Order of Isabella II =

Order of the Infanta (1833) Order of Isabella II (1833–1868)
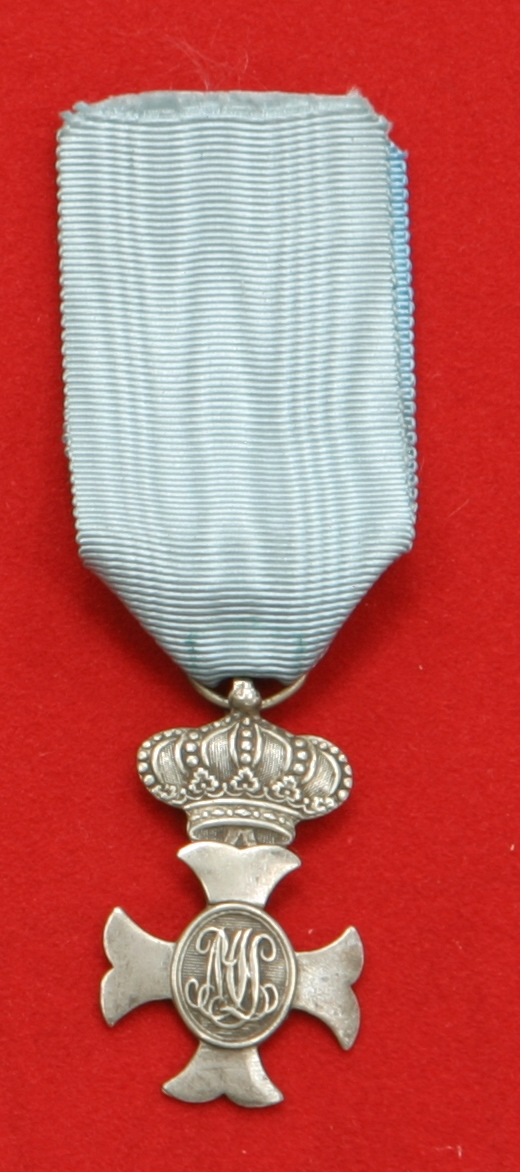
- The obverse of a silver class Order of Isabella II for other ranks
- Type: chivalric order
- Awarded for: Originally to mark the formal proclamation of the infanta María Isabel Luisa as heir to the Spanish throne; subsequently awarded to soldiers, both officers and other ranks, for general merit
- Country: Kingdom of Spain
- Eligibility: Spanish Armed Forces
- Status: Discontinued in 1868 and replaced by the Cross of Military Merit
- Established: Silver (other ranks') class — 19 June 1833; Gold (officer's) class — 19 March 1839
- Ribbon bar

The Order of the Infanta was a chivalric order of Spain, with only one class and awarded solely to soldiers, with a gold medal for officers and a silver one for other ranks, both on a blue ribbon attached to the lapel. It was established on 19 June 1833 by Ferdinand VII to mark the oath of loyalty he made that day to his daughter Isabella as heir to the throne. It was renamed the Order of Isabella II on her accession to the throne in 1833.
