= Eduarda Mansilla =

Argentine writer and composer

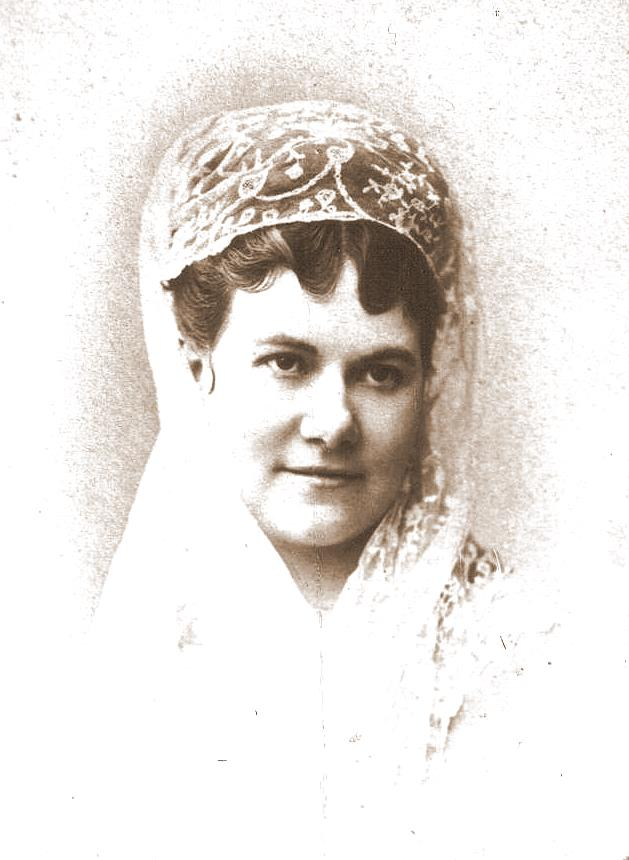
Eduarda Mansilla in 1875

Eduarda Damasia Mansilla Ortiz de Rozas de García (1834–1892) was an Argentine writer, composer, and musician.

== Biography ==
She was the daughter of Lucio Norberto Mansilla and niece of Juan Manuel de Rosas Her first literary work under her own name was the gauchesque novel Pablo ou la vie dans les Pampas, published in Paris in 1869. As the title implies, the novel was written in French. It concerned bringing order to the Pampas. After the publication of her novel, she spent time in Paris. Mansilla also wrote of her visits to the United States where she sympathized with the Native Americans in the United States, while nevertheless emphasizing them as primitive, but also sympathized with the slave-owners of the Confederate States of America. In life she had to deal with men of conflicting political beliefs as her husband was the son of an opponent of Juan Manuel de Rosas.

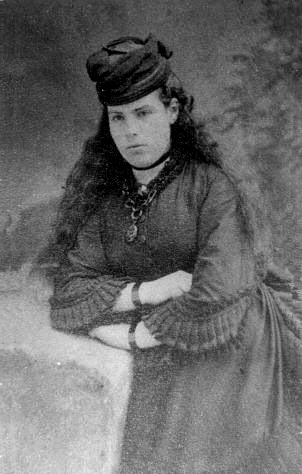
Eduarda Mansilla

== Musical influence ==
Eduarda Mansilla was formally trained to be a musician. Growing up in Buenos Aires she had learned to play the piano. This particular aspect of her up bringing was a result of the prevalent social norms of the times, which dictated that people of high social standing be well versed in music. Mansilla even composed music, and had published some of them.

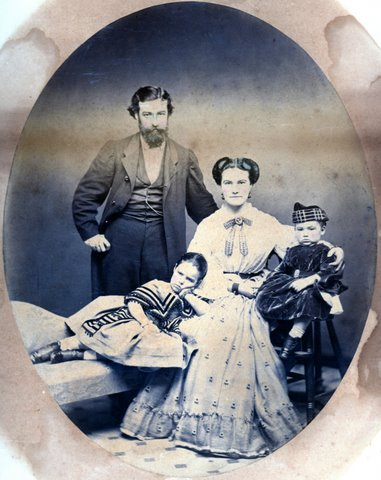
Family portrait taken during Eduarda Mansilla's U.S. visit, 1861.

Her musical training manifested in her writings as well. Music as a subject, its performance, and references to musical instruments are common in her literary works.

== See also ==
- Lists of writers
