= Manuel Rosas =

Manuel Rosas may refer to:

- Manuel Rosas (footballer, born 1912) (1912–1989), Mexican football defender
- Manuel Rosas (footballer, born 1983), Nicaraguan football left-back

== See also ==
- Manuela Rosas (1817-1898), Argentine personality and activist
- Juan Manuel de Rosas, Argentine military figure and strongman
