= Fernando García del Molino =

Chilean-born Argentine portrait painter, miniaturist and lithographer

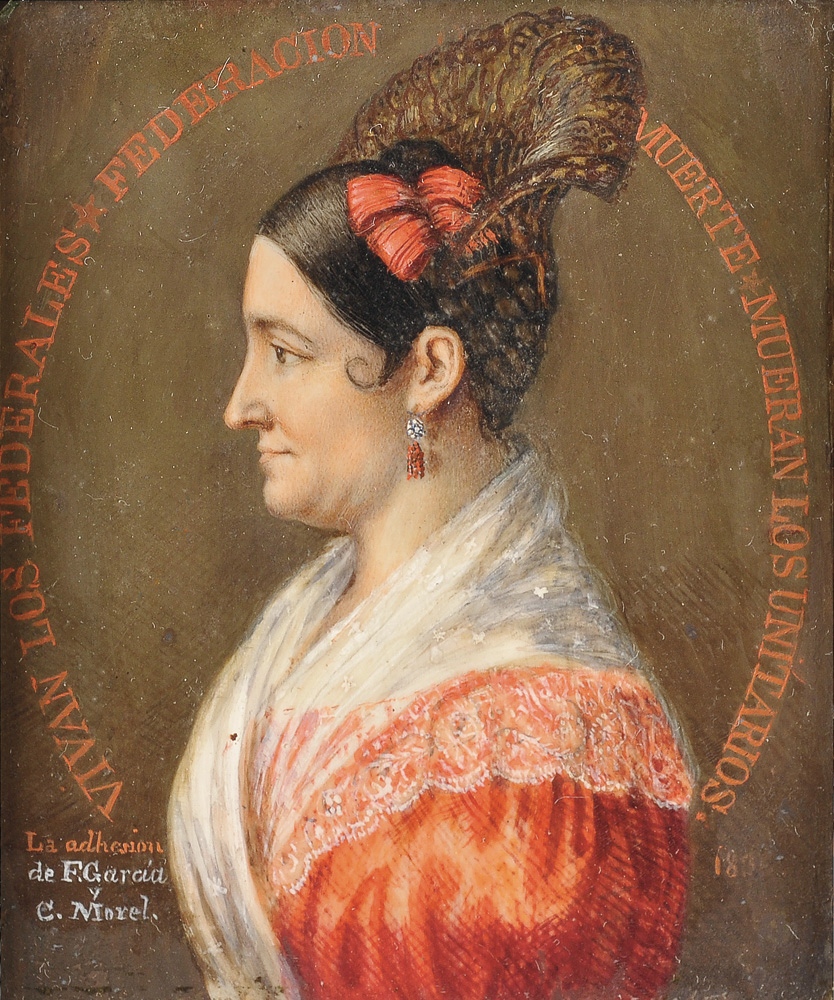
Portrait of Encarnación Ezcurra; possibly done with Carlos Morel. (c.1835)

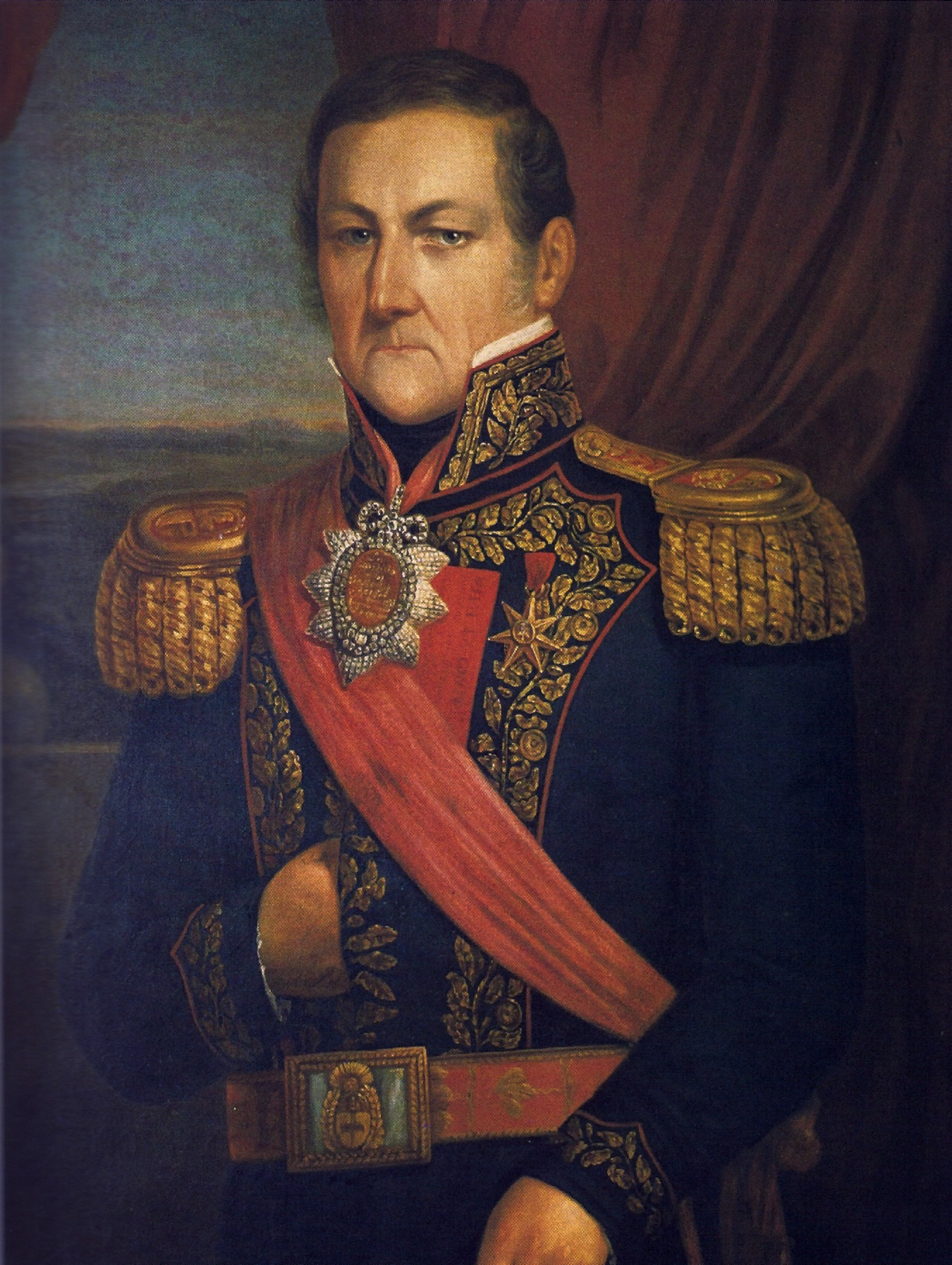
Portrait of Juan Manuel de Rosas. (c. 1850)

Fernando García del Molino (23 March 1813, Santiago — 1899, Buenos Aires) was a Kingdom of Chile-born (later naturalized Argentine) portrait painter, miniaturist and lithographer. Many of his portraits were done from photographs or daguerrotypes.

== Biography ==
He was born to a family of Spanish merchants. In 1822, when he was only nine, they moved to Buenos Aires. Shortly after, he began to show some artistic talent and was enrolled in classes at the "Academy of Drawing" of the University of Buenos Aires, where he studied with the Italian painter, Pablo Caccianiga (1798–1862). While there, he befriended his fellow student Carlos Morel and they often painted together. After graduating, he turned to teaching. One of his earliest students was Franklin Rawson, only six years his junior. He was already a well-known artist by the age of twenty-five.

During the Juan Manuel de Rosas administration, he created most of his best-known portraits, including those of Manuela Rosas, Encarnación Ezcurra, Rosas himself and many more of those in his immediate circle. He visited Rosas' home in the Palermo District so frequently, that he virtually became the Governor's official painter.

He also created portraits of notable figures from Argentine history, including Facundo Quiroga and José Félix Aldao. After Rosas went into exile, his commissions decreased dramatically. Later, he took a trip to London; invited by Manuela Rosas and her husband, Máximo Terrero (1817–1898), the son of rancher and businessman Juan Nepomuceno Terrero. While there, he painted another portrait of the elderly Rosas, probably in Southampton.
