= Amán Rawson =

American-Argentine physician and merchant

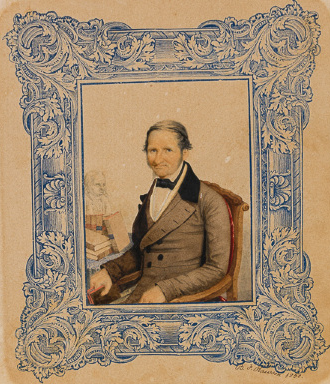
- Portrait by his son
- Born: Haman Rawson; 1792; Montague, Massachusetts, United States
- Died: January 1847 (aged 54–55); San Juan, Argentina
- Occupations: Doctor, politician
- Political party: Unitarian Party
- Children: Franklin Rawson; Guillermo Rawson

Amán Rawson (born Haman Rawson; 1792 – January 1847) was an American–Argentine medical doctor and merchant based in San Juan, Argentina, who was well known during the first half of the nineteenth century. He was the father of the Argentine interior minister Guillermo Rawson.

== Biography ==
Haman Rawson was born in 1792 in Montague, Massachusetts, United States. He received his doctorate in medicine in 1814 and was a surgeon in the United States Navy. He was a descendant of Edward Rawson. He arrived in Buenos Aires in 1818 and after a short time in Mendoza arrived in San Juan at the start of 1819. In 1819 he married Justina Rojo, after officially becoming a Catholic, although he never practiced that religion. Rawson devoted himself to medicine and opened a drugstore or pharmacy. He built an imposing mansion and was the father of the painter Benjamin Franklin Rawson and the physician and minister Guillermo Rawson. After his wife died in 1822, he had an illegitimate daughter with Carmen Castro Nuñez who was called Rosa Rawson.

In 1822 Rawson planned to found an agricultural colony of American immigrants, but ended with one of Argentine people. This was the origin of the present city of Caucete, and the extension of irrigation on the left bank of San Juan River. In the same year he was elected provincial deputy, but resigned in December of the next year. He opposed the revolution of the clergy who rejected the religious freedom advocated by Governor Salvador María del Carril. He was appointed chief physician of the province and had to face an epidemic of smallpox, which allowed him to expand the use of vaccine against the disease.

Rawson became a deputy in 1830, during the period when the province was ruled by the Unitarians. He was chairman of the government that took control for four days in April 1831, along with the priest José de Oro and Ignacio José Sánchez, following the news that Federalist forces led by General Facundo Quiroga were approaching. He called an election, which a moderate Federalist José Tomás Albarracín won. When a supporter of Quiroga, Valentín Ruiz, was elected governor in April the following year, he resigned as legislator.

In 1834 Rawson returned as a deputy, and supported the policy of Governor Martín Yanzón, a Federalist who had good relations with the Unitarians. He was Yanzón's minister for a few months, until he was replaced by Domingo de Oro, who persuaded the governor to organize a revolution in the neighboring province of Mendoza and engage in a war against La Rioja, which caused his fall. His replacement, Nazario Benavídez, appointed Rawson as his representative to negotiate the peace treaty with the government of La Rioja. Rawson was respected by all parties, but clearly sympathized with the Unitarians.

Rawson became provincial deputy again in 1839, and was president of the legislature. The following year he unsuccessfully funded bribes to the soldiers who wanted to change sides and overthrow caudillo Benavídez. He supported the invasions of General Mariano Acha and Gregorio Aráoz de Lamadrid in 1841, but on the return of Benavídez he remained deputy leader.

In his last days Rawson introduced copies of the Sarmiento's book "Facundo", which was considered an effective pamphlet against the political system ruled by Juan Manuel de Rosas. To avoid their being discovered, he hid them in drawers into which he introduced a chemical stench, with a large sign warning that were remedies for venereal diseases.

He died in San Juan on 12 January 1847.
