= Domingo Ortiz de Rozas y Rodillo =

Capitán Domingo Ortiz de Rozas y Rodillo
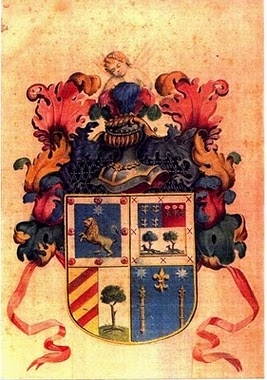
- Shield belonging to Ortiz de Rozas family

Personal details
- Born: 9 August 1721 Seville, Spain
- Died: 1785 (aged 63-64) Buenos Aires, Argentina
- Spouse(s): Catalina de La Cuadra; Gregoria de Gogenola
- Occupation: army government
- Profession: Armed forces
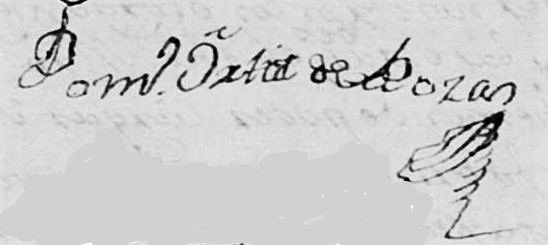
- Signature

Military service
- Allegiance: Spanish Empire
- Branch/service: Spanish Army
- Years of service: 1730-1780
- Rank: Captain
- Unit: Real Cuerpo de Guardias Españolas de Infantería

Domingo Ortiz de Rozas (1721 – 1785) was a Spanish nobleman, who served in the Royal Guards at the service of the Spanish monarchs.

He was born in Sevilla, Spain, the son of Bartolomé Ortiz de Rozas García de Villasuso and María Antonia Rodillo de Brizuela, belonging to a noble family from Santander. He began his military career as a cadet in the "Guardias de Corps", a special infantry corps created to serve as custodians of the Spanish monarchs.

In 1742 he was sent to serve in Buenos Aires by order issued in Madrid by Ferdinand VI. He arrived at the port of Buenos Aires, accompanying to his uncle the future Governor of the Río de la Plata Don Domingo Ortiz de Rozas y García de Villasuso.

Domingo Ortiz de Rozas Rodillo married in twice time, first with Catalina de La Cuadra, daughter of Pablo González de la Cuadra and Isabel Fernández Ponce de León. After widowed he married May 11, 1745 in Buenos Aires to Gregoria Antonia de Gogenola, daughter of Mateo de Gogenola Eguía and Isabel Cristina de la Cuadra.

Domingo Ortiz de Rozas Rodillo and his first wife were the parents of León Ortiz de Rozas. His grandson was the caudillo Juan Manuel de Rosas, the main political leader of Argentina towards the first half of the 19th century.
