= León Ortiz de Rozas =

Capitán León Ortiz de Rozas
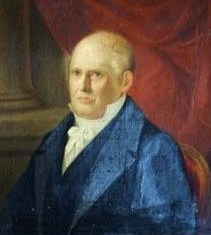
- portrait of León Ortiz de Rozas

Mayor of Buenos Aires
- In office 1814–1814
- Preceded by: ?
- Succeeded by: ?

Comandante of the Regimiento Fijo de Buenos Aires
- In office 1797–1809
- Preceded by: ?
- Succeeded by: ?

Personal details
- Born: León José Ortiz de Rozas y de la Cuadra; April 11, 1760 Buenos Aires, Argentina
- Died: August 15, 1839 (aged 79) Buenos Aires, Argentina
- Resting place: Cementerio de la Recoleta
- Spouse: Agustina López de Osornio
- Occupation: army politician landowner
- Profession: military man

Military service
- Allegiance: (Spanish Empire) Spain – until 1810 (Argentina) United Provinces of the River Plate
- Branch/service: Spanish Army
- Years of service: 1767–1809
- Rank: Captain
- Unit: Regimiento Fijo de Infantería de Buenos Aires
- Battles/wars: Campaigns prior to the Conquest of the Desert; Spanish–Portuguese War; British invasions of the River Plate

León Ortiz de Rozas (April 11, 1760 – August 15, 1839) was a Spanish military and politician, who had an active participation during the colonial and post colonial period of Argentina. He served as Commander in the military expeditions against the Indians during the Viceroyalty of the Río de la Plata.

== Biography ==
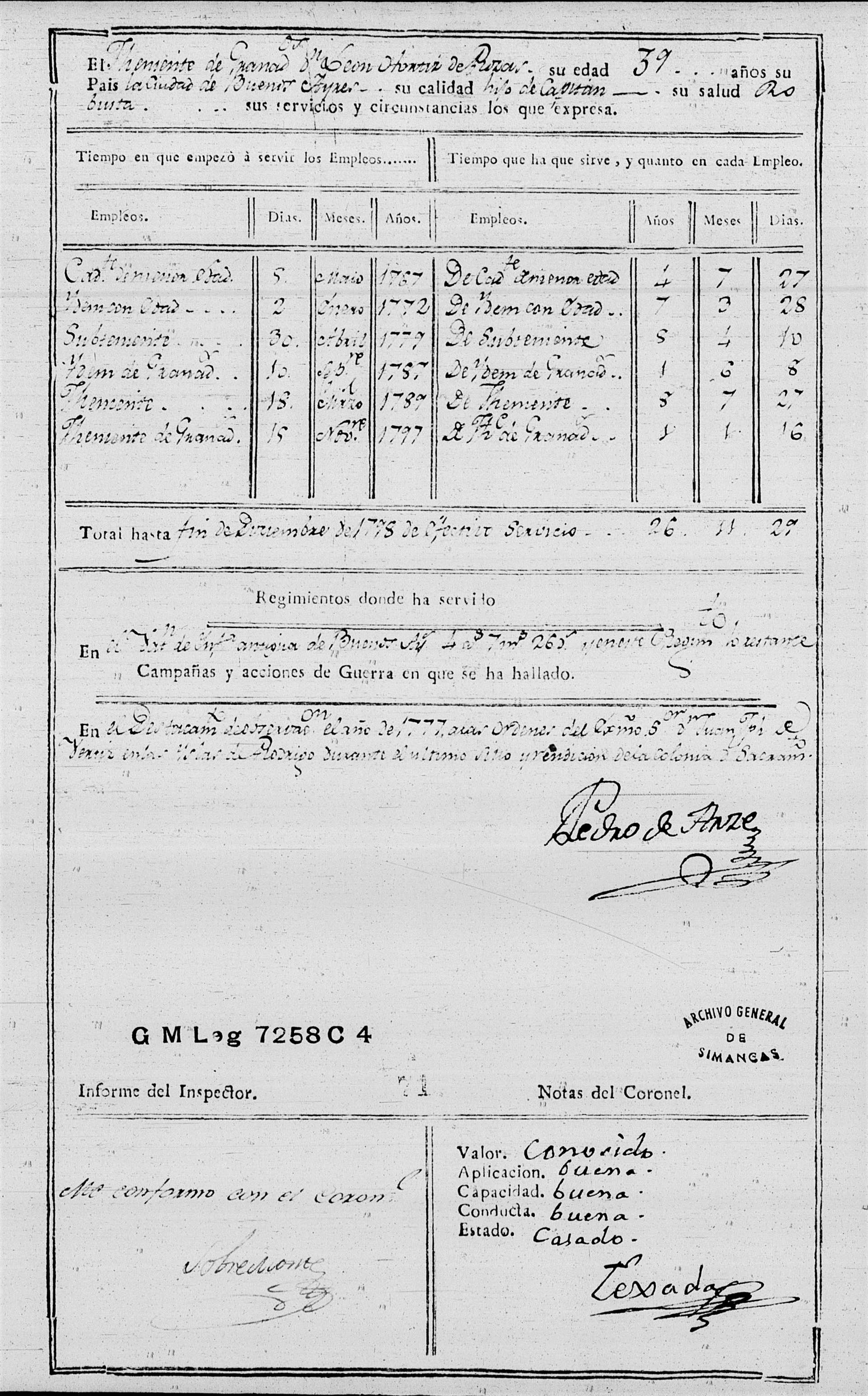
His record of services until the year 1798

He was born in Buenos Aires, the son of Captain Domingo Ortiz de Rozas y Rodillo, born in Seville, and Catalina de la Cuadra, a noblewoman born in the city. He began his military career in 1767 as a Cadet in the Infantry Battalion, then served in the Compañía de Granaderos with the rank of sublieutenant, and he was promoted to lieutenant on March 18, 1789. Some years later he reached the rank of captain, serving in the Regimiento Fijo de Buenos Aires.

He took part in numerous military campaigns against the indigenous who carried out massacres in the rural populations of the province of Buenos Aires. In 1785, he was taken prisoner by the tribes of the Pampas. He was captured on January 26, of that year and freed September 16, 1786.

He and his family participated in the defense and reconquest of the city against the English invaders. He retired from the army in 1809, after forty-two years of active service.

He also had a short political career, serving as regidor of the Cabildo de Buenos Aires between 1811 and 1814. In 1814 he held the position of interim alcalde and was appointed as supervisor of the weekly draws of the national lottery.

León Ortiz de Rozas married September 30, 1790 in Buenos Aires to Agustina López de Osornio, daughter of Clemente López de Osornio and María Manuela de Rubio, belonging to a distinguished Creole family. He and his wife had twelve children, Juan Manuel, María Dominga, Gregoria, Andrea Mercedes, Prudencio, Gervasio José, María, Juana, Benigno, Manuela, Dominga Mercedes and Martina Agustina.

Through his mother, Ortiz de Rozas descended from the first conquerors of the Río de la Plata and Paraguay. Among his ancestors was the famous conqueror Domingo Martínez de Irala, born in Gipuzkoa. He died on August 15, 1839, in Buenos Aires, being buried with military honors in the Recoleta Cemetery.
