= Guillermo Rawson =

Argentine doctor and politician (1821–1890)

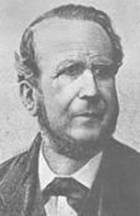
- Born: 24 June 1821; San Juan, Argentina
- Died: 2 February 1890 (aged 68); Paris, Third French Republic
- Occupation: Doctor
- Known for: Interior Minister of Argentina
- Political party: Nationalist Party

Guillermo Rawson (24 June 1821 – 2 February 1890) was a medical doctor and politician in nineteenth-century Argentina. In 1862, when he was the Interior Minister of Argentina, he met Captain Love Jones-Parry and Lewis Jones, who were on their way to Patagonia to investigate whether it was suitable for the creation of a Welsh settlement there. Rawson came to an agreement with them, and this resulted in the creation of a colony in the Chubut Valley in the following years. The city of Rawson, the capital of the province of Chubut, was named after him.

== Biography ==
Memorial to Guillermo Rawson in Buenos Aires

Rawson's parents were Amán Rawson, a doctor who had emigrated from the United States to Argentina, and Justina Rojo, a daughter of a wealthy family in San Juan, where Guillermo was born. His elder brother was the artist Franklin Rawson. His half-brother was Lieutenant Colonel Juan de Dios Rawson, grandfather of Arturo Rawson.

After a Jesuit education in San Juan, Rawson graduated from the Medical Faculty of University of Buenos Aires in 1844. Rawson became interested in politics and democracy. In 1853, he was jailed for opposing Nazario Benavidez, the caudillo or de facto governor of San Juan. The following year he was a member of the Paraná Congress, and from 1862, he was Interior Minister in the government of Bartolomé Mitre.

Apart from politics, Rawson was interested in medicine and hygiene. In 1876, he attended the Centennial Exposition in Philadelphia to present his work on public health in Buenos Aires, the most developed body of work on the subject at the time. In 1879, he was elected a member of the American Antiquarian Society.

Rawson spent a year in Paris in 1881 for medical treatment, before returning to Argentina. He returned to France for further treatment in 1885 and died in Paris in 1890.

The building of the first medical school in Buenos Aires is named Escuela Dr Guillermo Rawson in his honour.
