= Franklin Rawson =

Argentine painter

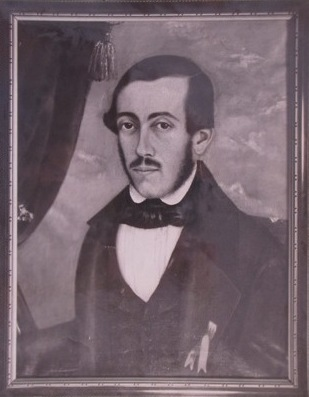
- Self-portrait (1838)
- Born: Benjamin Franklin Rawson; 29 March 1819 (or 1820); San Juan, Argentina
- Died: 14 March 1871; Buenos Aires

Benjamin Franklin Rawson (29 March 1819 or 1820 – 14 March 1871) was an Argentine painter who belonged to the first generation of Argentine painters called the "precursors". His best known works are the Murder of Manuel Vicente Maza and Rescue in the Cordillera.

== Early life ==
Benjamin Franklin Rawson was born on 29 March 1819 (or 1820) in the city of San Juan. He was the eldest son of the marriage between American doctor Amán Rawson and Justina Rojo y Frías. His younger brother, Guillermo Rawson (1821–1890) was also a physician and politician who served as minister of the Interior under President Bartolomé Mitre. He first studied with Domingo Faustino Sarmiento, his lifelong friend. He then started to paint, taught by Amadeo Gras and Pierre Douet.

Later, Rawson was part of the San Juan plastic movement promoted by the Philharmonic Dramatic Society, which had been created by Sarmiento. When he turned eighteen years old, his father sent him to Buenos Aires, where he was a pupil of Fernando García del Molino, under whom he perfected portrait and miniature painting. In 1838 he made his self-portrait and a year later, in 1839, painted an oil portrait of his brother.

== Exile, return and last years ==
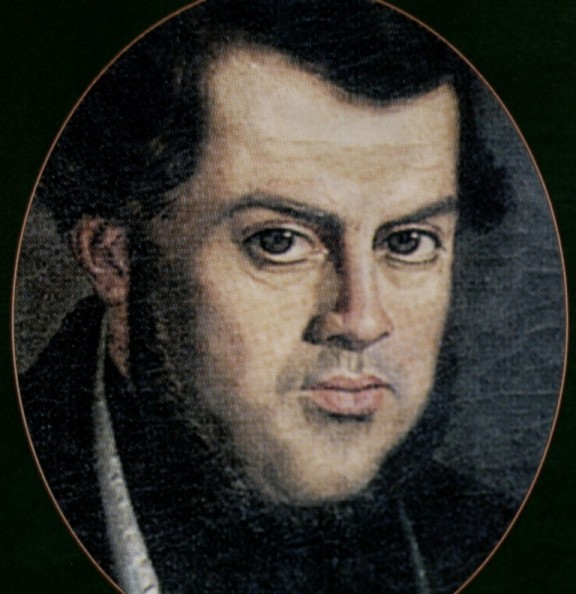
Portrait of Sarmiento (Chile, 1845)

After studying in Buenos Aires, Rawson returned to San Juan. However, due to the political conflicts that erupted in the province and his friendship with Sarmiento he was forced to leave the country in 1842, taking refuge in Chile. There he continued his apprenticeship with the painter French Augusto Quinsac Monvoisin, while sharing a house with Sarmiento, and sharing their studies with Procesa, Sarmiento's sister. Sarmiento describes this period in his book Recuerdos de provincia (Memories of the province).

On 25 March 1847, Rawson married Paz Mendieta. The only son of this marriage, Franklin, died in infancy. He returned to San Juan in the same year and was elected a provincial deputy. However, he resigned and moved back to Buenos Aires, where he continued his studies with Martín Boneo. In 1856, he hosted a show of historical works in this city. Sarmiento asked French painter Juan León Pallière for his opinion for a notice in the newspaper El Nacional. He replied as follows:

Of course, if you come to America from Europe and for many years have lived in an environment of great artists and great models, finding that these works exist is fascinating, but seeing such flawless execution in unexpected, and the carefully cultivated art, the correct study of drawing, nature perfectly understood, and the choice of color reveal a true painter.

According to Sarmiento, he was the best painter of his time. After this show, his importance began to decline due to the appearance of the daguerreotype or early photography that competed with the portrait.

Rawson died in Buenos Aires on 14 March 1871, one of the victims of an epidemic of yellow fever that struck the city in those years.

== Work ==
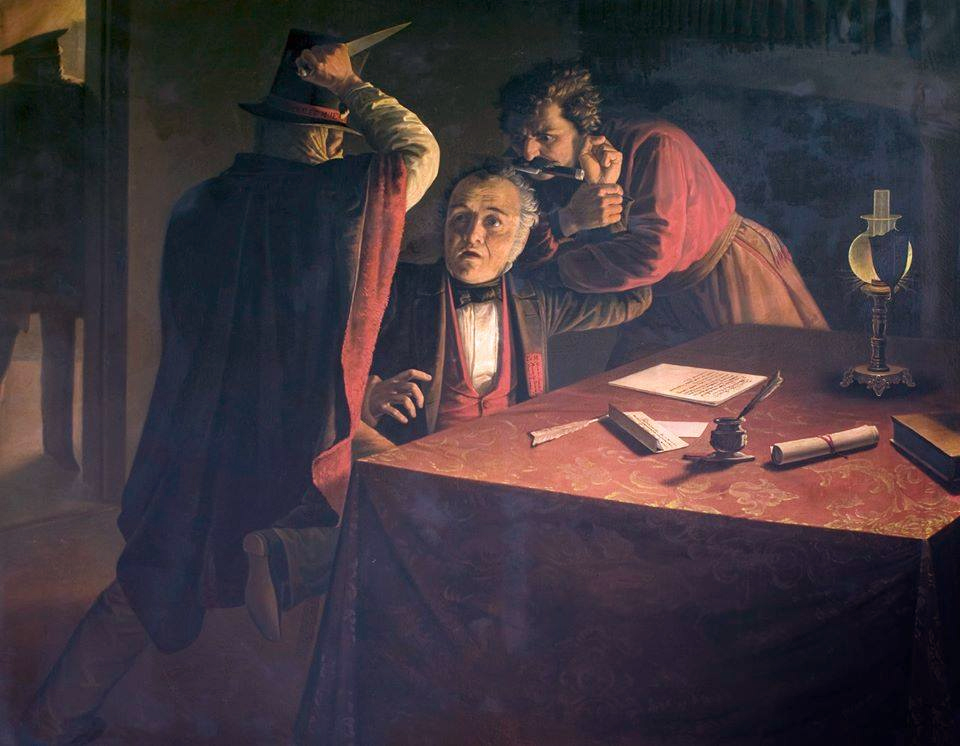
Murder of Manuel Vicente Maza (1860)

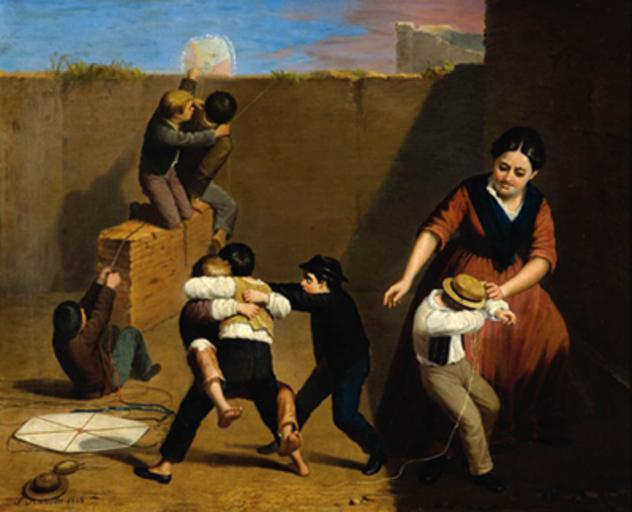
La cometa (the kite) (1868)

Rawson painted figures and scenes of his time, always characterized with a sense of balance. Most of his work consists of portraits and miniatures, lucrative genres because the wealthy social sector paid well to preserve their images. Three of his works are surprising for their realism: his self-portrait (1838), the oil painting of William Rawson (1839) and the young Sarmiento (1842). His portraits were very expressive, well-observed character studies, such as his portrait of Don Eustaquio Díaz Vélez. Among the female images is that of doña Tránsito Oro de Lerma, sister of the bishop Oro de Lerma, of Jacinta Paz Rojo and Paz Sarmiento de Laspiur. He also painted infants, such as the portrait of Adan Aberastain as a child.

Rawson also made several historically themed productions. Rescue in the Cordillera (1855) is a well-known work where his friend Sarmiento and McDonald appears in a heroic episode in which he was not actually involved, in distributing aid from Chile to the survivors of the Unitarian forces that were defeated at the Battle of Rodeo del Medio, surprised by a snowstorm. The hero gives out bread to help them overcome the natural elements. The Flight of Malon (1860) shows a father, mother and son on horseback leaving behind their house, which has been set of fire by Indians. The most important creation of the historical genre was also painted by the artist in 1860 and is called the Murder of Manuel Vicente Maza, which reproduces a moment in the murder of the former governor of Buenos Aires Province.

Among the few religious works of the painter, the Immaculate Conception (1845) is notable, oil on canvas more than 3 metres (9.8 ft) long. Everyday scenes include El Escobero (1865) and La Cometa (1868), one of his last works.

The San Juan Museum of Fine Arts, which houses one of the most important collections in Argentina, has taken his name since 1938 at the initiative of Alfredo Martin Palma, a member of the Commission of Fine Arts.
