= Revolution of the Restorers =

Rebellion that took place in Buenos Aires in 1833

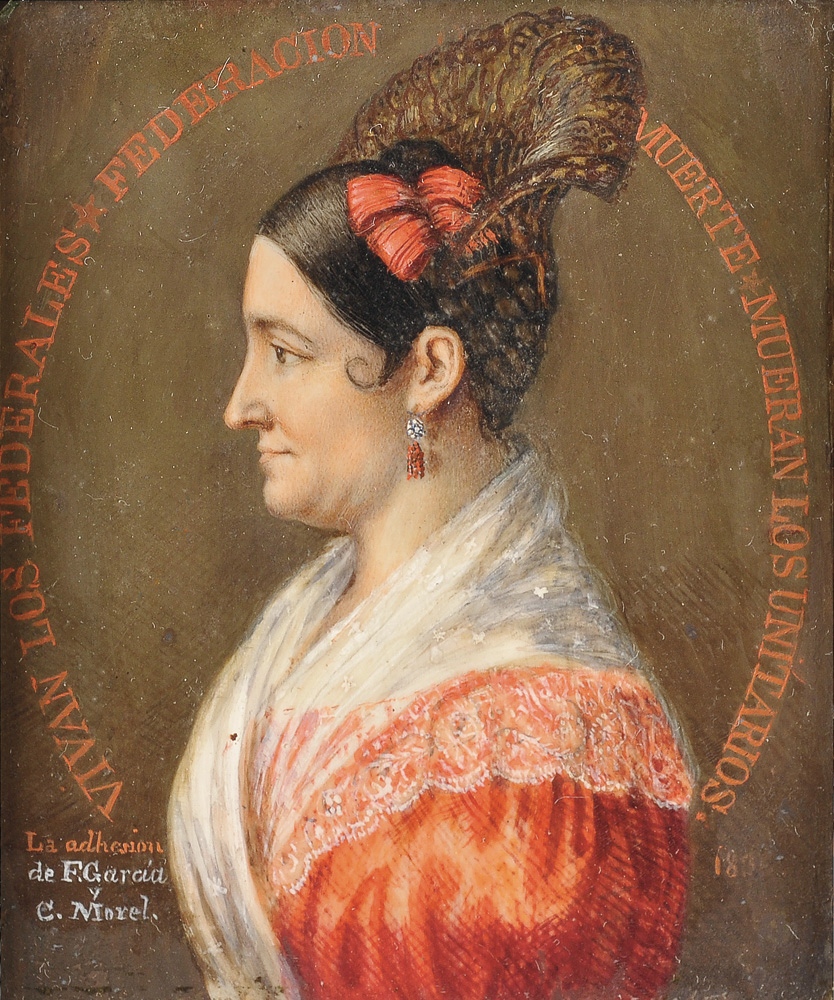
- Encarnación Ezcurra organized the Revolution of the Restorers
- Date: October 1833
- Location: Buenos Aires
- Participants: Federales
- Outcome: The governor Juan Ramón Balcarce was ousted from office and replaced by Juan José Viamonte.

The Revolution of the Restorers (Spanish: Revolución de los Restauradores) was a rebellion that took place in Buenos Aires in 1833. The governor Juan Ramón Balcarce was ousted from office and replaced by Juan José Viamonte. The rebellion was motivated by actions taken by Balcarce against former governor Juan Manuel de Rosas. Rosas was absent from the city by that time, but the rebellion was supported by his wife Encarnación Ezcurra. It strengthened the political power of Rosas, who would become governor a second time a short time later.

== Development ==
On October 11, 1833, Buenos Aires was filled with banners announcing a trial against Juan Manuel de Rosas. Rosas was not in the city at the time, he was instead in the south, waging the Desert Campaign (1833–34). The popular reaction was immediate. José María Benavente arrived with many riders from the pampas, and was followed by Cuitiño, Parra, Commander Hidalgo, José Montes de Oca, Lieutenant Cabrera, Commissars Chanteiro, Robles, Piedrabuena and others. They were known as "Restorers" because they were supporters of Rosas, who was known as the "Restorer of Laws". The commotion prevents the audience from taking place, and all shops were closed out of fear. Generals Pinedo and Izquierdo were ordered to lead the troops to control the demonstration, but they disobeyed and joined the demonstration as leaders instead.

The quick reaction was possible because of the active intervention of Encarnación Ezcurra, wife of Rosas. She had a fluent relation with the mentioned caudillos, and suspected that Balcarce may attempt to act against Rosas sooner or later. The movement also secured the arsenals kept at Quilmes, Ensenada and Dolores.

The government of Balcarce was left without military power of support. They tried to negotiate an end of hostilities, without success. The food in the city became scarce as the days passed. The threat of new hostilities raised on November 1, and the legislature requested an armistice. Pinedo offered to stay quiet for 24 hours, requesting the resignation of Balcarce. Balcarce called an assembly to decide what to do, on the promise of having an answer by the 6:00 of the morning of the following day. He finally decided to accept whatever the legislature decided. The legislature removed him from office, and designated Juan José Viamonte as the new governor.

The Revolution of the Restorers led to the creation of the Mazorca, which would later operate during the next term of Rosas.
