= Sociedad Popular Restauradora =

Argentine security agency

The Sociedad Popular Restauradora (Spanish: Popular Restorer Society) was an Argentine security agency that worked for Juan Manuel de Rosas in the mid-nineteenth century. It is usually equated to the organization called the "Mazorca", which was actually the security and military force working for it.

It was created by Encarnación Ezcurra, Rosas' wife, during the Revolution of the Restorers, and disbanded by Rosas in 1846. It was focused in locating people (mostly Unitarians, but also opposing Federals) involved in conspiracies against Rosas. Modern historical investigations that set apart the executions performed by the Mazorca and executions carried out by other forces loyal to Rosas number those deaths at nearly 20 in 1840 and 20 more in 1842.

== Etymology ==
Although some thought that the word Mazorca derived from "más horca" (more gallows), the more sinister (and orthographically plausible) belief was that the mazorca (Spanish for "corncob") referred to their chosen instrument of rectal torture. As explained by General John Thomond O'Brien (the Uruguayan Agent in England) for the benefit of the British Foreign Secretary Lord Aberdeen:

The Masorcas [sic], or secret affiliation, in support of Rosas's government, derives its name from the inward stalk of the maize, when deprived of its grain, and has been used by members of the clubs as an instrument of torture, of which your Lordship may form some idea when calling to mind the agonizing death of Edward II.

O'Brien, who claimed to have known Rosas for 25 years, added:

My Lord, I know of these tortures being inflicted. At the time that Oribe invaded the Banda Oriental, with the army and the Masorca [sic] commissioners of Rosas, I was residing on my estate in the country. I was aware of wretches being staked into the ground forty-eight hours before their heads were sawed, not cut, off; – of the lasso being flung over persons' necks, and then drawn by horse at full speed until life became extinct; – of spikes being driven into the mouths of human beings, and they, whilst living, thus nailed to trees.

== See also ==
- The Slaughter Yard
