= Encarnación Ezcurra =

Argentine politician

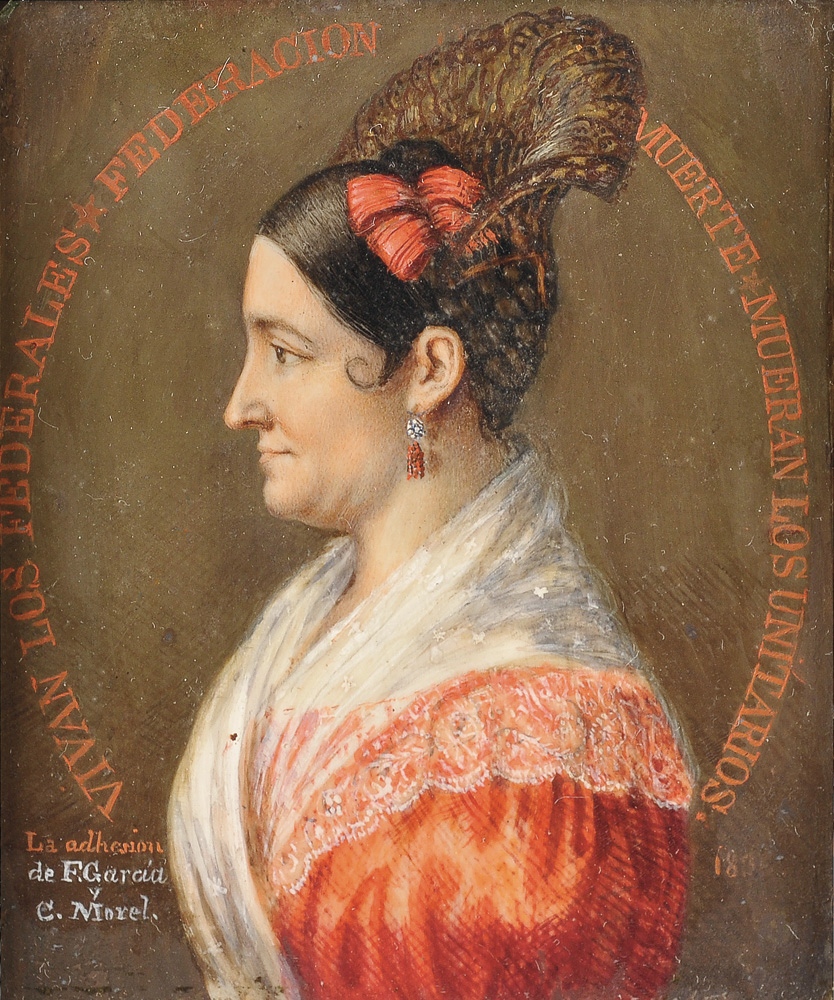
- Encarnación Ezcurra portrayed by García del Molino and Morel c. 1835. She wears a red ribbon on her hair, a symbol of the Federalist Party, as well as the fashionable peinetón.
- Born: María de la Encarnación Ezcurra; March 25, 1795; Buenos Aires, Viceroyalty of the Rio de la Plata
- Died: October 20, 1838 (aged 43); Buenos Aires, Argentina
- Resting place: San Francisco convent
- Known for: Revolution of the Restorers
- Political party: Federal party
- Spouse: Juan Manuel de Rosas
- Children: Pedro Pablo, Juan Manuel, María, Manuela Rosas
- Parent(s): Teodora de Arguibel and Juan Ignacio Ezcurra

María de la Encarnación Ezcurra (March 25, 1795 – October 20, 1838) was an Argentine political activist, wife of Juan Manuel de Rosas.

She was the daughter of Juan Ignacio Ezcurra and Teodora de Arguibel. She married Rosas on March 16, 1813. She became her husband's most faithful follower, helping him in many difficult circumstances. In 1833–1834, her husband was away from Buenos Aires leading an army in the Desert Campaign to extend Argentina's frontier. She was the driving force behind the Revolution of the Restorers, and was the president of the Mazorca, an organization which acted as a secret police.

The Revolution of the Restorers unseated Juan Ramón Balcarce the governor of the Buenos Aires. The Mazorca put pressure on every government worker to vocally campaign for the return of de Rosas. This forced the provincial legislature, the Board of Representatives, which had the power to designate governors, to regard her husband as the only option to restore social order in the province.

After the triumph of her husband in the Desert Campaign (1833–34), and with her success in securing the governorship for him, the people gave her the title of Heroine of the Holy Federation. It is particularly notable that at that time prejudices against women participating in politics ran high, yet Ezcurra achieved great responsibilities and a considerable following.

She died unexpectedly at the age of 43. Even today historians dispute the cause of her death although many believe that she died of cardiac arrest or a similar condition. Her death, however, caused great grief among the people and the political establishment. Twenty five thousand participated in her funeral procession from el Fuerte to the Convent of San Francisco, where she was buried. That would have represented 40% of the total population living in Buenos Aires at the time. The funeral costs were paid for by the Board of Representatives, whom Rosas formally thanked on November 1, 1838.
