= Manuela Rosas =

Argentine personality and political activist

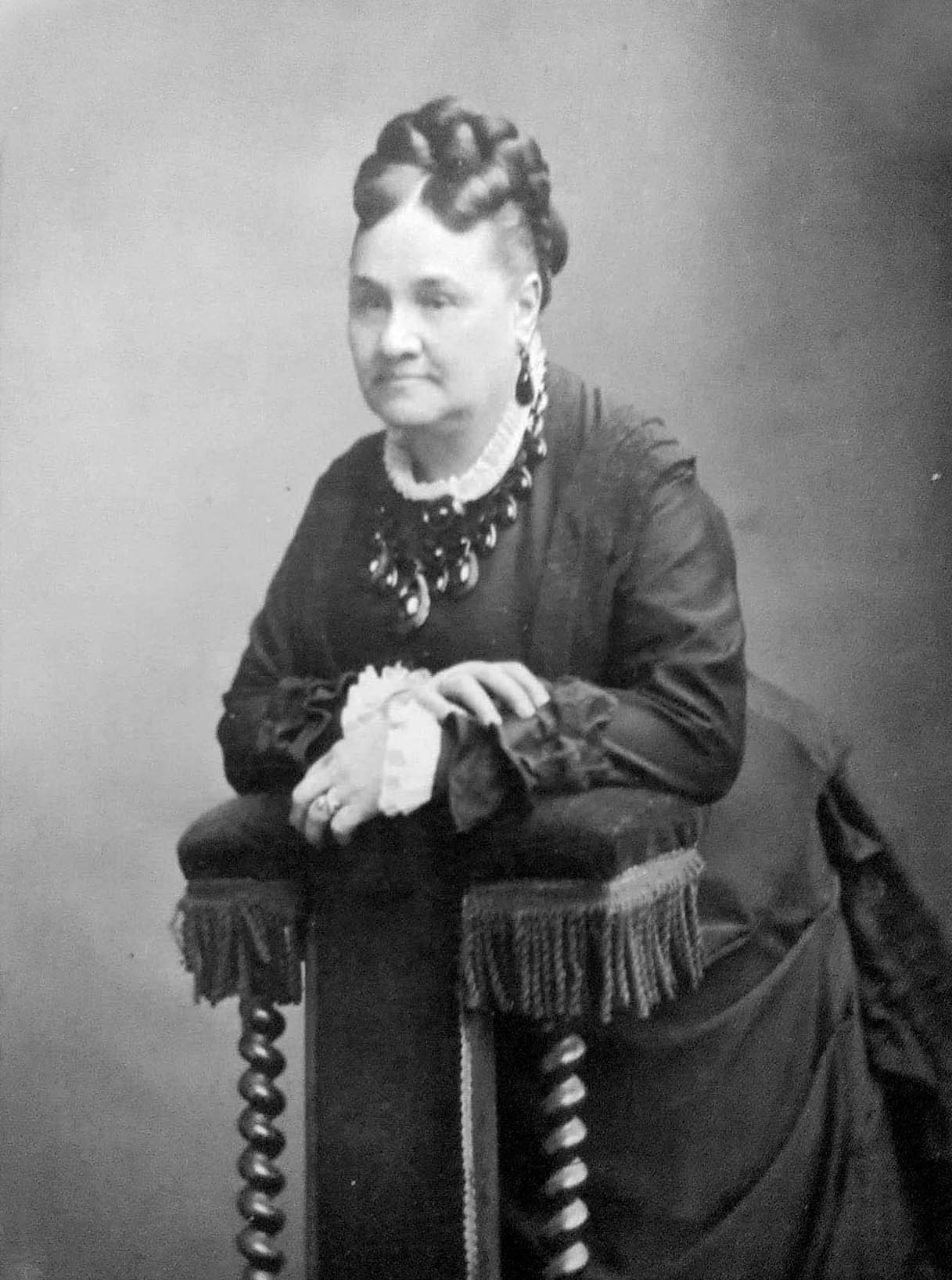
Rosas photographed in London in 1877

Manuela de Rosas (May 24, 1817 – September 17, 1898) or more commonly “Manuelita de Rosas”, was an Argentine personality and political activist. She was born in Buenos Aires, Argentina and the influential daughter of Juan Manuel de Rosas and Encarnación Ezcurra.

== Childhood ==
In a time of caudillos leading the region of Buenos Aires, Manuela grew up in household of ambition under her parents. No one else came close to matching the power and influence of Juan Manuel de Rosas. In addition, her mother was without equal for her position. This created a unique household environment for Manuela growing up. As Monteiro Lobato laments, “Manuelita’s home was a strange mixture of love without tenderness and of companionship without delicacy.”

In the chaos of having a caudillo father, Manuela thrived. She was presented to Argentina as a princess figure. Combined with her intellect, Manuela enhanced the image of her less diplomatic father. Where he was an abrasive strongman, she provided the softer touch. Some argue that her spoiled upbringing led to an unquestioning loyalty to her father. When her mother died, she moved to a more elevated status that her mother had occupied.

== Political life ==
Manuela followed the footsteps of her mother, playing an active role in the politics of Argentina. At a time when charisma and garnering support was crucial to becoming the leader, Juan Manuel de Rosas relied on his daughter as the link to the outside world. This was in part because it was dangerous for Juan Manuel de Rosas to be in the public due to his enemies, but also she excelled at her role in the public's eye.

Her management of her father’s public relations began early, even as a little girl, entertaining her father’s guests. As an adult, she entertained foreign diplomats and government officials. She could converse in French with Europeans and was also a skilled piano player. In addition, she excelled at building support from various group in Argentina for her father. While he was a symbol of power, she was a more subtle force that complemented her father. There is a famous story of her dancing with a black community that was coming to pay respects to the Rosas, winning them over. This isn’t an isolated example. She captured the attention of all that she hosted.

When many suitors wanted her hand in marriage, Juan Manuel de Rosas thought it best for her to remain “La Niña” to all of Buenos Aires. He made her swear that she would never marry and in exchange he would not remarry. During this time, she was very popular in the public’s eyes.

== Late life ==
Later in life, she married the son of an old associate of her parents, Máximo Terrero, on the 22nd of October in Southampton. Together, they had two children: Manuel Máximo Juan Nepomuceno and Rodrigo Tomás Terrero y Rosas. Her son Manuel married the English suffragette Jane Beddall in 1885. In breaking the promise to never marry, her father never forgave her. Despite this, when Juan Manuel de Rosas was sent in exile due to the Battle of Caseros in which he loses, he asks her not to keep contact, she remained loyal and kept correspondence. She died in London on September 17, 1898. She lived a quiet life in exile and never returned to Argentina after her father’s defeat at the Battle of Caseros.

== Painting by Prilidiano Pueyrredón ==
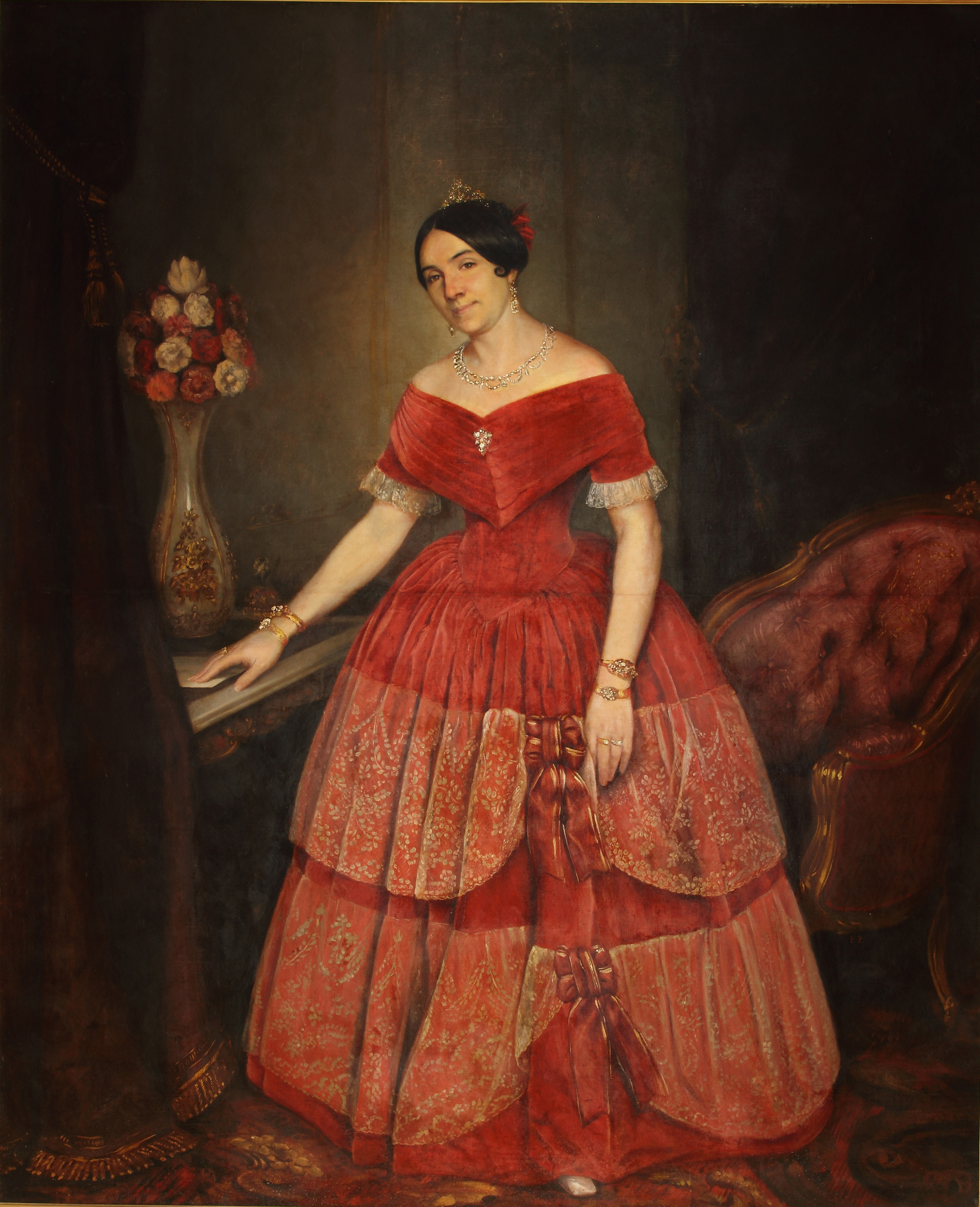
Portrait by Prilidiano Pueyrredón

The portrait of Manuela Rosas by Prilidiano Pueyrredón gives some insight into the Rosas period. Manuela de Rosas serves as an exemplar in this painting, and it was commissioned this way. The badge on her dress is meant to convey that everyone in Argentina has an obligation to the Federalist Party of her father.

Furthermore, her white skin and European dress is purposeful. Being the public figure that she was, this indicated a lot about what was seen as ideal. Beyond her loyalty to her father, she did break many norms of the time by holding a position in government.
