= Juan Manuel de Rosas =

Argentine politician and general (1793–1877)

Caudillo Juan Manuel de Rosas
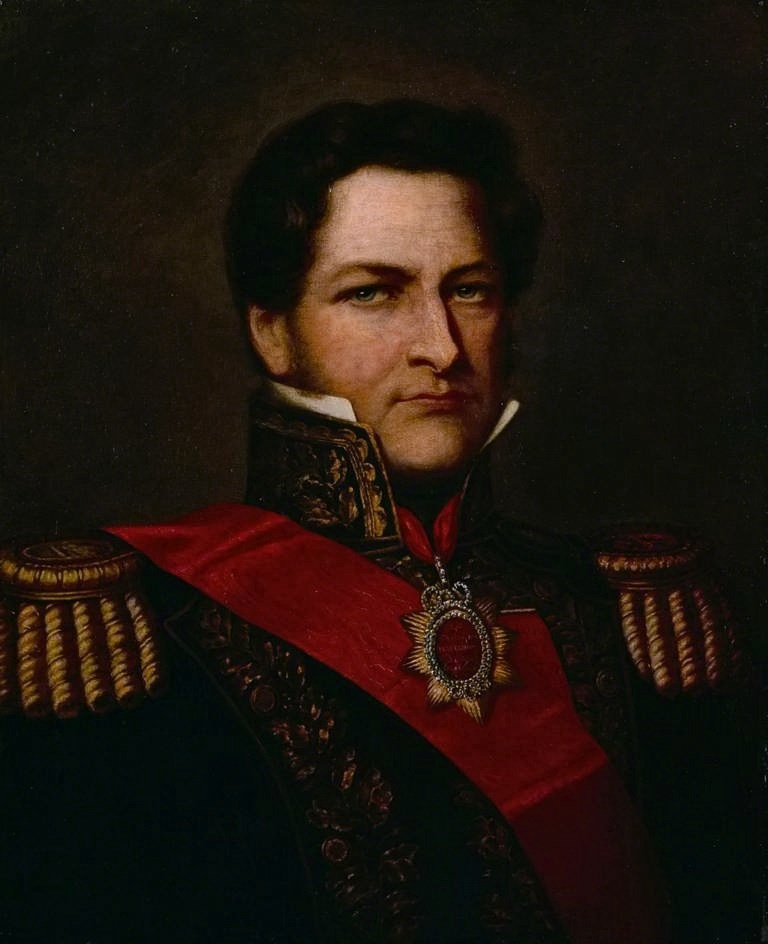
- Juan Manuel de Rosas in 1840

13th and 17th Governor of Buenos Aires Province
- In office 7 March 1835 – 3 February 1852
- Preceded by: Manuel Vicente Maza
- Succeeded by: Vicente López y Planes
- In office 6 December 1829 – 5 December 1832
- Preceded by: Juan José Viamonte
- Succeeded by: Juan Ramón Balcarce

Personal details
- Born: Juan Manuel José Domingo Ortiz de Rozas y López de Osornio; 30 March 1793 Buenos Aires, Viceroyalty of the Río de la Plata
- Died: 14 March 1877 (aged 83) Southampton, UK
- Resting place: La Recoleta Cemetery, Buenos Aires
- Party: Federalist Party (1826–1852)
- Spouse: Encarnación Ezcurra (m. 1813; died 1838)
- Children: Juan Bautista Ortiz de Rosas; Manuela Robustiana Rosas; Pedro de Rosas y Belgrano (adoptive); Ángela Rosas (not recognised); Emilio Rosas (not recognised); Joaquín Rosas (not recognised); Nicanora Rosas (not recognised); Justina Rosas (not recognised); Adrián Rosas (not recognised)
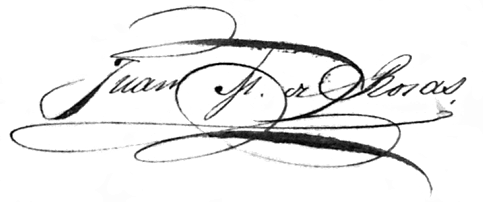
- Signature

Military service
- Battles/wars: British invasions of the River Plate; Argentine Civil Wars; Desert Campaign (1833–1834); Tarija War; French blockade of the Río de la Plata; Anglo-French blockade of the Río de la Plata; Platine War; Uruguayan Civil War; Battle of Caseros

Juan Manuel José Domingo Ortiz de Rozas y López de Osornio (30 March 1793 – 14 March 1877), nicknamed "Restorer of the Laws", (Note: The full title was "Restorer of the Laws and Institutions of the Province of Buenos Aires". It was given to Rosas by the House of Representatives of Buenos Aires on 18 December 1829. After the Desert Campaign he was called the "Conqueror of the desert" (Conquistador del desierto). As his dictatorship became more repressive, Rosas became known as the "Tiger of Palermo", after his main residence in Palermo, then located outside the town of Buenos Aires.) was an Argentine politician and army officer who ruled Buenos Aires Province and briefly the Argentine Confederation. Born into a wealthy family, Rosas independently amassed a personal fortune, acquiring large tracts of land in the process. Rosas enlisted his workers in a private militia, as was common for rural proprietors, and took part in the disputes that led to numerous civil wars in his country. Victorious in warfare, personally influential, and with vast landholdings and a loyal private army, Rosas became a caudillo, as provincial warlords in the region were known. He eventually reached the rank of brigadier general, the highest in the Argentine Army, and became the undisputed leader of the Federalist Party.

In December 1829, Rosas became governor of the province of Buenos Aires and established a dictatorship backed by state terrorism. In 1831, he signed the Federal Pact, recognising provincial autonomy and creating the Argentine Confederation. When his term of office ended in 1832, Rosas departed to the frontier to wage war on the indigenous peoples. After his supporters launched a coup in Buenos Aires, Rosas was asked to return and once again took office as governor. Rosas reestablished his dictatorship and formed the repressive Mazorca, an armed parapolice that killed thousands of citizens. Elections became a farce, and the legislature and judiciary became docile instruments of his will. Rosas created a cult of personality and his regime became totalitarian in nature, with all aspects of society rigidly controlled.

Rosas faced many threats to his power during the late 1830s and early 1840s. He fought a war against the Peru–Bolivian Confederation, endured a blockade by France, faced a revolt in his own province and battled a major rebellion that lasted for years and spread to five northern Argentine provinces. Rosas persevered and extended his influence in the provinces, exercising effective control over them through direct and indirect means. By 1848, he had extended his power beyond the borders of Buenos Aires and was ruler of all of Argentina. Rosas also attempted to annex the neighbouring nations of Uruguay and Paraguay. France and Great Britain jointly retaliated against Argentine expansionism, blockading Buenos Aires for most of the late 1840s, but were unable to halt Rosas, whose prestige was greatly enhanced by his string of successes.

When the Empire of Brazil began aiding Uruguay in its struggle against Argentina, Rosas declared war in August 1851, starting the Platine War. This short conflict ended with Rosas being defeated and exiled to Britain. His last years were spent in exile as a tenant farmer in Southampton, Hampshire, until his death in 1877. Rosas garnered an enduring public perception among Argentines as a brutal tyrant. Since the 1930s, an authoritarian, antisemitic and racist political movement in Argentina known as Nacionalismo has attempted to improve Rosas' reputation and establish a new dictatorship on the model of his regime. In 1989, his remains were repatriated by the government in an attempt to promote national unity, seeking to rehabilitate Rosas and pardon military personnel convicted of human rights abuses. Rosas remains a controversial figure in Argentina in the 21st century; he was represented on the 20 Argentine peso bill until 2017.

== Early life ==
=== Birth ===
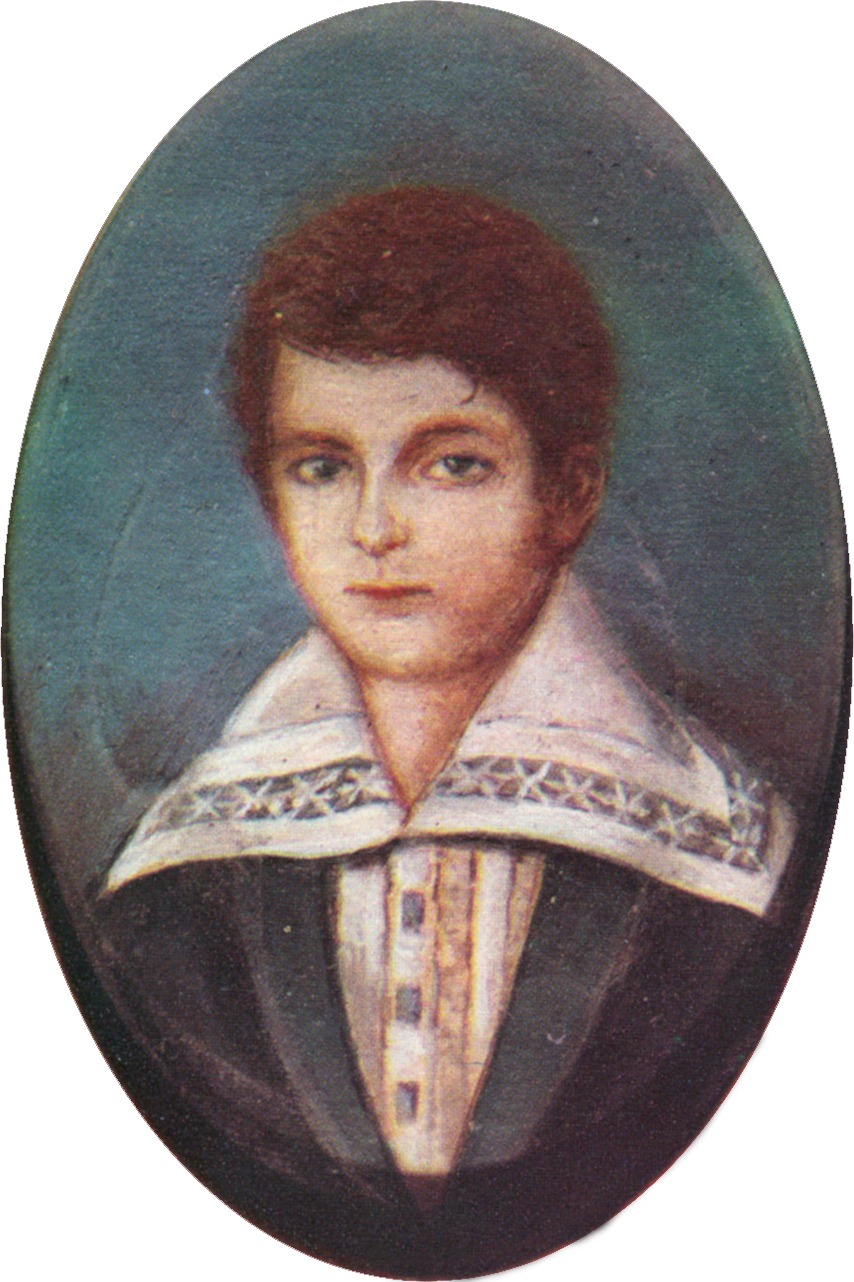
Rosas around age 10, c. 1803

Juan Manuel José Domingo Ortiz de Rozas (Note: According to his birth certificate, his given name was "Juan Manuel José Domingo". His surname, as seen on his marriage certificate, was "Ortiz de Rosas".) was born on 30 March 1793 at his family's town house in Buenos Aires, the capital of the Viceroyalty of the Río de la Plata. He was the first child of León Ortiz de Rozas, a military officer with an undistinguished career, and his wife Agustina López de Osornio, from a wealthy criollo family. His father was the son of Domingo Ortiz de Rozas y Rodillo, a Spanish officer from Seville. The young Juan Manuel de Rosas' character was heavily influenced by his mother Agustina, a strong-willed and domineering woman who derived these character traits from her father Clemente López de Osornio, a landowner who died defending his estate from an Indian attack in 1783.

As was common practice at the time, Rosas was schooled at home until the age of eight, and then enrolled in what was regarded the best private school in Buenos Aires. Though befitting the son of a wealthy landowner, his education was unremarkable. According to historian John Lynch, Rosas' education "was supplemented by his own efforts in the years that followed. Rosas was not entirely unread, though the time, the place, and his own bias limited the choice of authors. He appears to have had a sympathetic, if superficial, acquaintance with minor political thinkers of French absolutism".

In 1806, a British expeditionary force invaded Buenos Aires. A 13-year-old Rosas served in distributing ammunition to troops in a force organised by Viceroy Santiago Liniers to counter the invasion. The British were defeated in August 1806, but returned a year later. Rosas was then assigned to the Caballería de los Migueletes (a militia cavalry), although he was probably barred from active duty during this time due to illness.

=== Estanciero ===
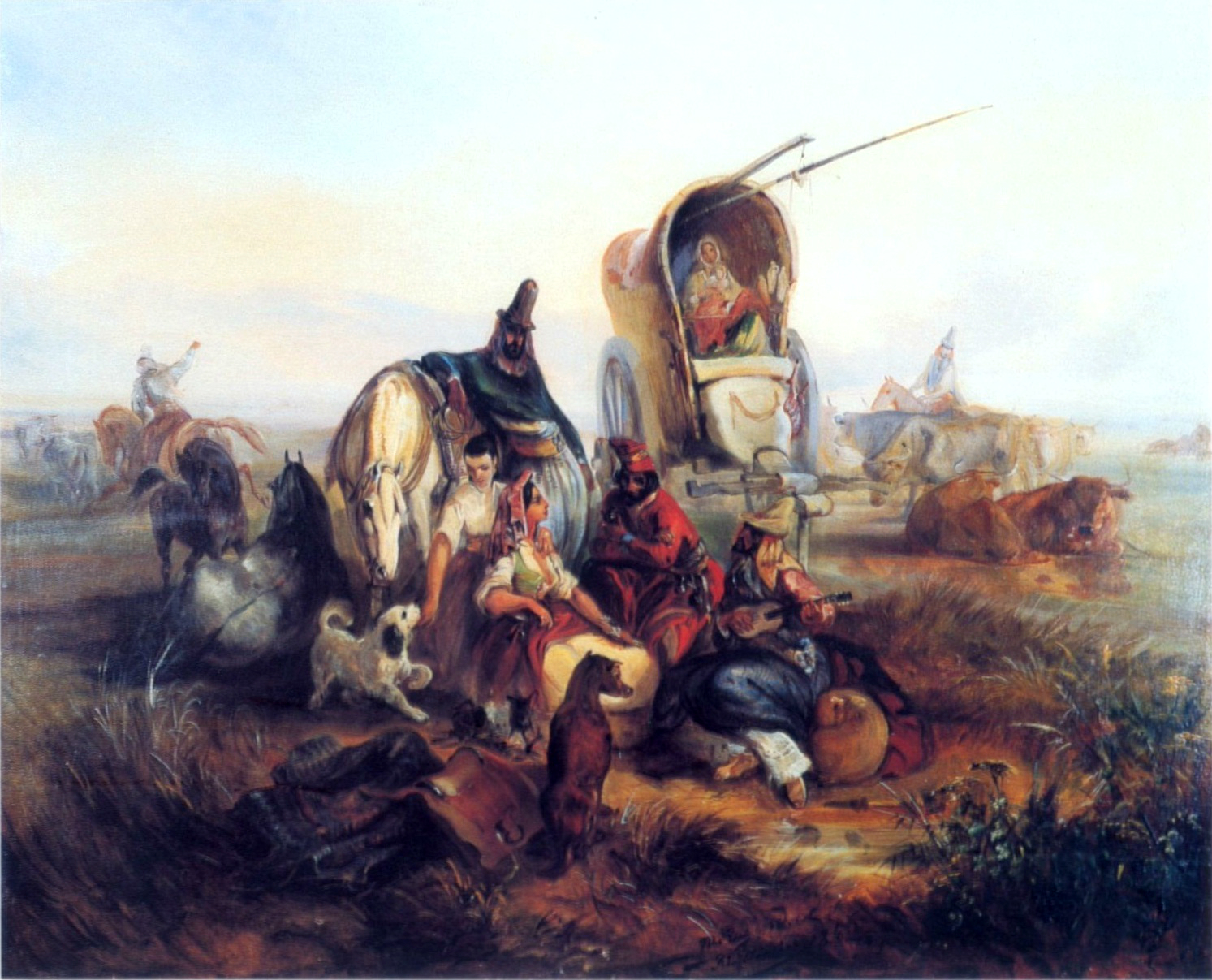
Gauchos resting in the pampas. Oil painting by Johann Moritz Rugendas

After the British invasions had been repelled, Rosas and his family moved from Buenos Aires to their estancia (ranch). His work there further shaped his character and outlook as part of the Platine region's social establishment. In the Viceroyalty of the Río de la Plata, owners of large landholdings (including the Rosas family) provided food, equipment and protection for families living in areas under their control. Their private defence forces consisted primarily of labourers who were drafted as soldiers. Most of these peons, as such workers were called, were gauchos. (Note: Robert Bontine Cunninghame Graham described them as "herdsmen, who lived on horseback ... In their great plains, roamed over by enormous herds of cattle, and countless horses in semi-feral state, each Gaucho lived in his own reed-built rancho [ranch] daubed with mud to make its weathertight often without another neighbour nearer than a league away. His wife and children and possibly two or three other herdsmen, usually unmarried, to help him in the management of the cattle, made up his society. Generally he had some cattle of his own, and possibly a flock of sheep; but the great herds belonged to some proprietor who perhaps lived two or three leagues away.")

The landed aristocracy of Spanish descent considered the illiterate, mixed-race gauchos, who comprised the majority of the population, to be ungovernable and untrustworthy. The gauchos were tolerated because there was no other labour force available, but were treated with contempt by the landowners. Rosas got along well with the gauchos in his service, despite his harsh, authoritarian temperament. He was known to dress like them, joke with them, take part in their horse-play, and pay them well, but he never allowed them to forget that he was their master rather than their equal. Shaped by the colonial society in which he lived, Rosas was conservative, an advocate of hierarchy and authority, like the other great landowners in the region.

Rosas acquired a working knowledge of administering ranch lands and, beginning in 1811, took charge of his family's estancias. In 1813, he married Encarnación Ezcurra, daughter of a wealthy family from Buenos Aires. Soon afterwards, he sought to establish a career for himself, leaving his parents' estate. (Note: An anecdote circulated in which Rosas supposedly related how he left his childhood home with no belongings, determined to start a new life, never to return. The story says that he went so far as to change the spelling of his surname at that point. Rosas denied the version of events contained in this tale. Although he was left a portion of his father's estate, he assigned this to his mother. He did not reclaim the inheritance upon his mother's death, and instead split it between her maid, his siblings and charities.) He produced salted meat and acquired landholdings in the process. As the years passed he became an estanciero (rancher) in his own right, accumulating land while establishing a successful partnership with second cousins from the politically powerful Anchorena clan. His hard work and organisational skills in deploying labour were key to his success, rather than creating new or applying nontraditional approaches to production.

== Rise to power ==
=== Caudillo ===
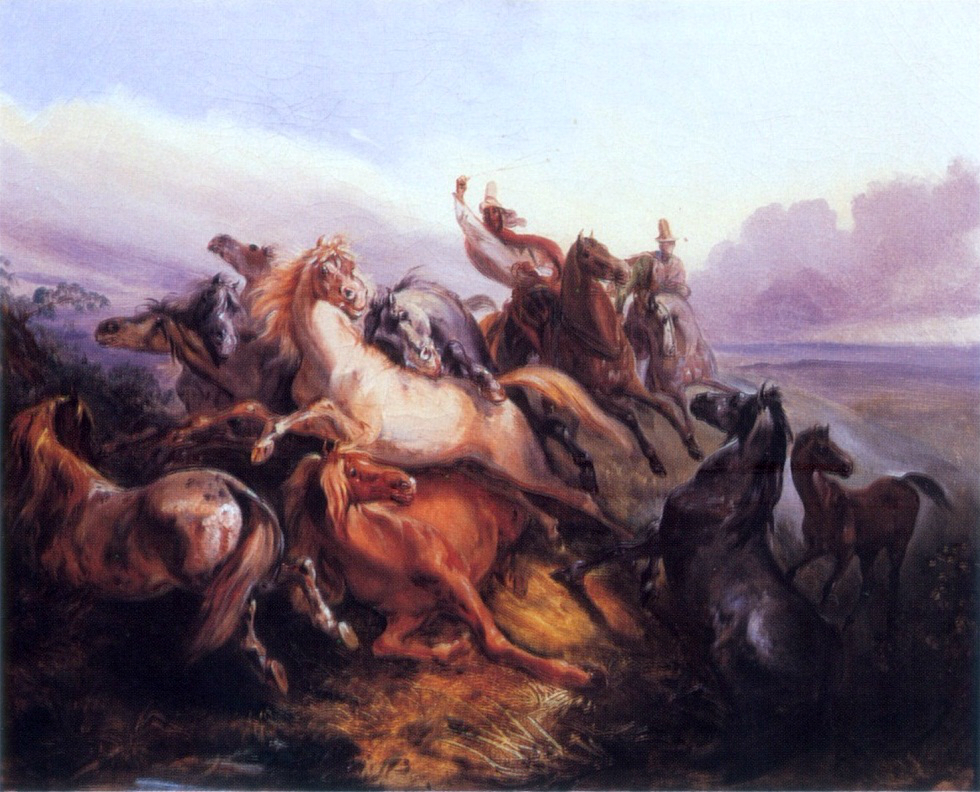
Gauchos hunting feral horses. They served in Rosas' private army

The May Revolution of 1810 marked the early stage of a process which later led to the disintegration of Spain's Viceroyalty of the Río de la Plata, independence and the eventual formation of Argentina. Rosas, like many landowners in the countryside, was suspicious of a movement advanced primarily by merchants and bureaucrats in the city of Buenos Aires. Rosas was specially outraged by the execution of Viceroy Santiago de Liniers at the hands of the revolutionaries. Rosas felt nostalgic about colonial times, seeing them as stable, orderly and prosperous.

When the Congress of Tucumán severed all remaining ties with Spain in July 1816, Rosas and his peers accepted independence as an accomplished fact. Independence resulted in a breakup of the territories that had formed the Viceroyalty of the Río de la Plata. The province of Buenos Aires fought a civil war with the other provinces over the degree of autonomy which the provincial governments were supposed to have. The Unitarian Party supported the preeminence of Buenos Aires, while the Federalist Party defended provincial autonomy. A decade of strife over the issue destroyed the ties between capital and provinces, with new republics being declared throughout the country. Efforts by the Buenos Aires government to quash these independent states were met with determined local resistance. In 1820 Rosas and his gauchos, all dressed in red and nicknamed Colorados del Monte ("Reds of the Mount"), enlisted in the army of Buenos Aires as the Fifth Regiment of Militia. They repulsed invading provincial armies, saving Buenos Aires.

At the end of the conflict, Rosas returned to his estancias having acquired prestige for his military service. He was promoted to cavalry colonel and was awarded further landholdings by the government. These additions, together with his successful business and fresh property acquisitions, greatly boosted his wealth. By 1830, he was the 10th largest landowner in the province of Buenos Aires (in which the city of the same name was located), owning 300,000 cattle and 420,000 acres (170,000 ha) of land. With his newly gained influence, military background, vast landholdings and a private army of gauchos loyal only to him, Rosas became the quintessential caudillo, as provincial warlords in the region were known. Rosas governance had a large impact on the Argentinian landscape, stiffening federal beliefs against the utilitarian resistance. He promoted self-determination while promoting his authority within Buenos Aires, directing conflicts with Utilitarian views that favored a centralized government. The issues between the Utilitarians and the Federalists constructed the course of Argentinian politics and contributed to the future of the nation.

=== Governor of Buenos Aires ===
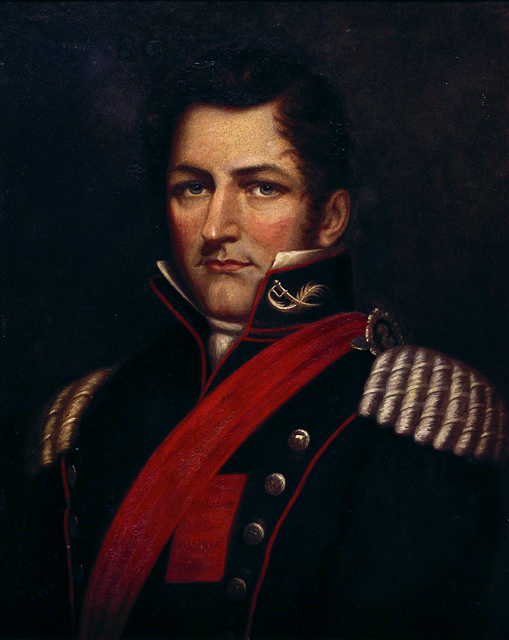
Rosas at age 36, 1829

National unity crumbled under the weight of a continuous round of civil wars, rebellions and coups. The Unitarian–Federalist struggle brought perennial instability while caudillos fought for power and laid waste to the countryside. By 1826, Rosas had built a power base, consisting of relatives, friends and clients, and joined the Federalist Party. He remained a strong advocate of his native province of Buenos Aires, with little concern for political ideology. In 1820, Rosas fought alongside the Unitarians because he saw the Federalist invasion as a menace to Buenos Aires. When the Unitarians sought to appease the Federalists by proposing to grant the other provinces a share in the customs revenues flowing through Buenos Aires, Rosas saw this as a threat to his province's interests. In 1827, four provinces led by Federalist caudillos rebelled against the Unitarian government. Rosas was the driving force behind the Federalist takeover of Buenos Aires and the election of Manuel Dorrego as provincial governor that year. Rosas was awarded with the post of general commander of the rural militias of the province of Buenos Aires on 14 July, which increased his influence and power.

In December 1828 Juan Lavalle, the Unitarian governor of Buenos Aires had Dorrego seized and executed without trial. With Dorrego gone, Rosas filled the vacant Federalist leadership and rebelled against the Unitarians. He allied with Estanislao López, caudillo and ruler of Santa Fe Province, and they defeated Lavalle at the Battle of Márquez Bridge in April 1829. When Rosas entered the city of Buenos Aires in November of that year, he was hailed both as a victorious military leader and as the head of the Federalists. Rosas was considered a handsome man, standing 1.77 metres (5 ft 10 in) tall with blond hair and "piercing blue eyes". Charles Darwin, who met Rosas during the Beagle survey expedition, assessed him as "a man of extraordinary character". (Note: Charles Darwin wrote in his journal in 1833: "He is a man of extraordinary character, and has a most predominant influence in the country, which it seems that he will use to its prosperity and advancement." Later, in 1845, he greatly revised his assertion, saying "This prophecy has turned out entirely and miserably wrong.") British diplomat Henry Southern said that in "appearance Rosas resembles an English gentleman farmer—his manners are courteous without being refined. He is affable and agreeable in conversation, which however nearly always turns on himself, but his tone is pleasant and agreeable enough. His memory is stupendous: and his accuracy in all points of detail never failing".

On 6 December 1829, the House of Representatives of Buenos Aires elected Rosas governor and granted him facultades extraordinarias (extraordinary faculties). This marked the beginning of his regime, described by historians as a dictatorship. He saw himself as a benevolent dictator, saying: "For me the ideal of good government would be paternal autocracy, intelligent, disinterested and indefatigable ... I have always admired the autocratic dictators who have been the first servants of their people. That is my great title: I have always sought to serve the country". He used his power to censor his critics and banish his enemies. He later justified these measures, stating: "When I took over the government I found the government in anarchy, divided into warring factions, reduced to pure chaos, a hell in miniature ..."

=== Desert Campaign ===
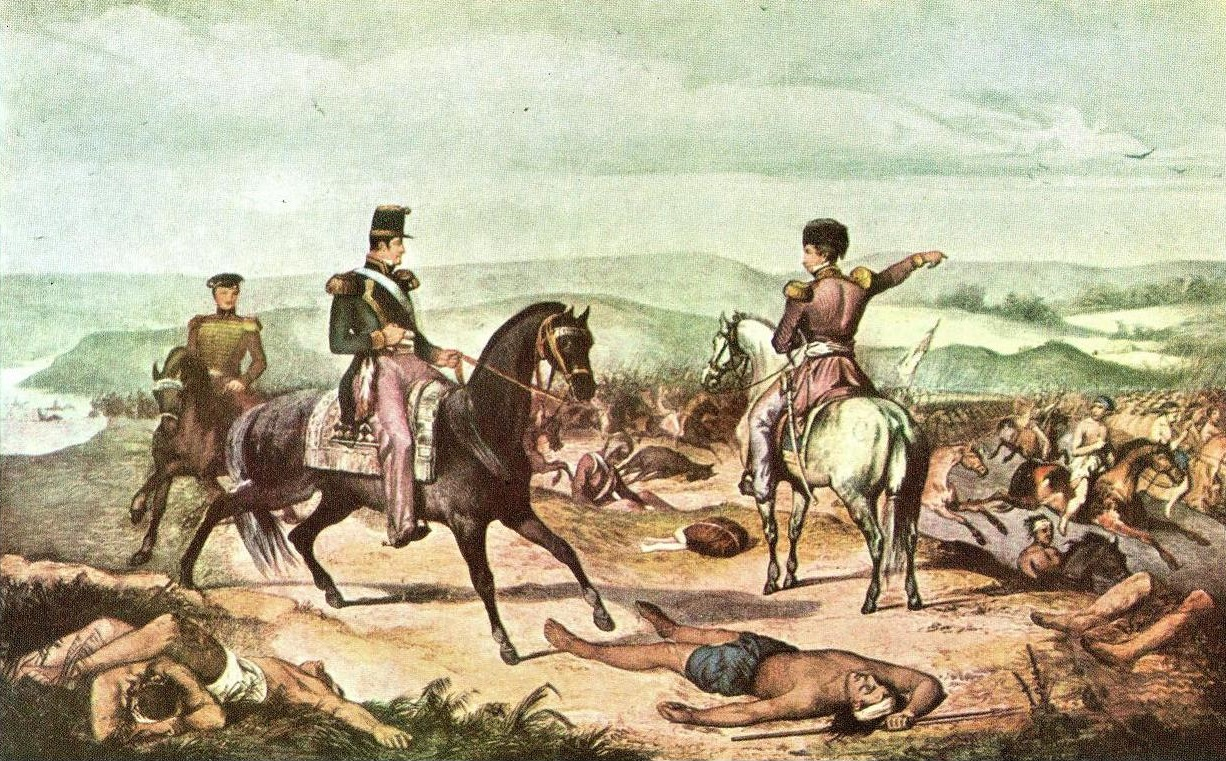
Rosas (mounted on dark horse) leading the war against Indians in the Desert Campaign, 1833

Rosas' early administration was preoccupied with the severe deficits, large public debts and the impact of currency devaluation which his government inherited. A great drought that began in December 1828, which would last until April 1832, greatly impacted the economy. The Unitarians were still at large, controlling several provinces that had banded together in the Unitarian League. The capture of José María Paz, the main Unitarian leader, in March 1831 resulted in the end of the Unitarian–Federalist civil war and the collapse of the Unitarian League. Rosas was content, for the moment, to agree to recognise provincial autonomy in the Federal Pact. In an effort to alleviate the government's financial problems, he improved revenue collection while not raising taxes and curtailed expenditure.

By the end of his first term, Rosas was generally credited with having staved off political and financial instability, but he faced increased opposition in the House of Representatives. All members of the House were Federalists, as Rosas had restored the legislature that had been in place under Dorrego, and which had subsequently been dissolved by Lavalle. A liberal Federalist faction, which accepted dictatorship as a temporary necessity, called for the adoption of a constitution. Rosas was unwilling to govern constrained by a constitutional framework and only grudgingly relinquished his dictatorial powers. His term of office ended soon after, on 5 December 1832.

While the government in Buenos Aires was distracted with political infighting, ranchers began moving into territories in the south inhabited by indigenous peoples. The resulting conflict with native peoples necessitated a government response. Rosas steadfastly endorsed policies which supported this expansion. During his governorship he granted lands in the south to war veterans and to ranchers seeking alternative pasture lands during the drought. Although the south was regarded as a virtual desert at the time, it had great potential and resources for agricultural development, particularly for ranching operations. The government gave Rosas command of an army with orders to subdue the Indian tribes in the coveted territory. Rosas was generous to those Indians who surrendered, rewarding them with animals and goods. Although he personally disliked killing Indians, he relentlessly hunted those who refused to yield. The Desert Campaign lasted from 1833 to 1834, with Rosas subjugating the entire region. His conquest of the south opened many possibilities for further territorial expansion, which led him to state: "The fine territories, which extend from the Andes to the coast and down to the Magellan Straits are now wide open for our children".

== Second governorship ==
=== Absolute power ===
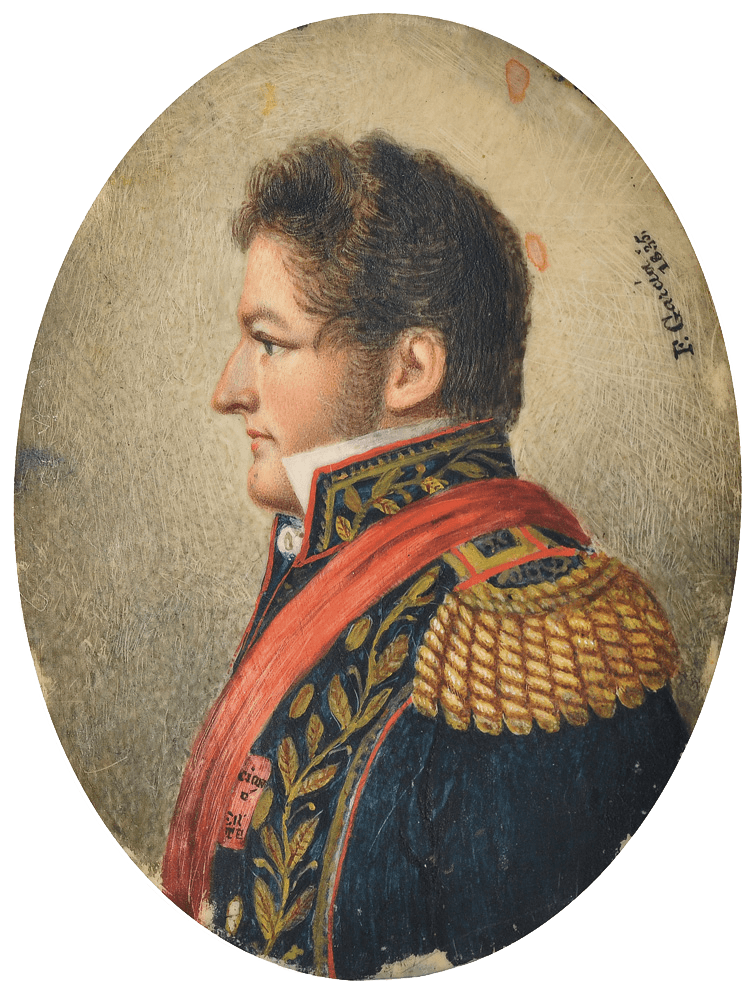
Profile view of Rosas at age 42, 1835; miniature by Fernando García del Molino

While Rosas was away on the Desert Campaign in October 1833, a group of Rosistas (Rosas' supporters) laid siege to Buenos Aires. Inside the city, Rosas' wife, Encarnación, assembled a contingent of associates to aid the besiegers. The Revolution of the Restorers, as the Rosista coup came to be known, forced the provincial governor Juan Ramón Balcarce to resign. In quick succession, Balcarce was followed by two others who presided over weak and ineffective governments. The Rosismo (Rosism) had become a powerful faction within the Federalist Party, and pressured other factions to accept a return of Rosas, endowed with dictatorial powers, as the only way to restore stability. The House of Representatives yielded, and on 7 March 1835, Rosas was reelected governor and invested with the suma del poder público (sum of public power).

A plebiscite was held to determine whether the citizens of Buenos Aires supported Rosas' reelection and resumption of dictatorial powers. During his governorship from 1829 to 1832, Rosas had reduced the election process to a farce. He had installed loyal associates as justices of the peace, powerful officeholders with administrative and judicial functions who were also charged with tax collection, leading militia and presiding over elections. Through the exclusion of voters and intimidation of the opposition, the justices of the peace delivered any result Rosas favored. Half of the members of the House of Representatives faced reelection each year, and the opposition to Rosas had quickly been eliminated through rigged elections, allowing him to control the legislature. Control over finances had been stripped from the legislature, and its approval of legislation turned into a rubber stamp to preserve a semblance of democracy. The result of the 1835 election was a predictable 99.9 per cent "yes" vote.

Rosas believed that the manipulation of elections were necessary for political stability, because most of the country's population was illiterate. He acquired absolute power over the province with the assent and support of most estancieros and businessmen, who shared his views. The estancia formed the power base on which Rosas relied. Lynch said that there "was a great deal of group cohesion and solidarity among the landed class. Rosas was the center of a vast kinship group based on land. He was surrounded by a closely knit economic and political network linking deputies, law officers, officials, and military who were also landowners and related among themselves or with Rosas".

=== Totalitarian regime ===
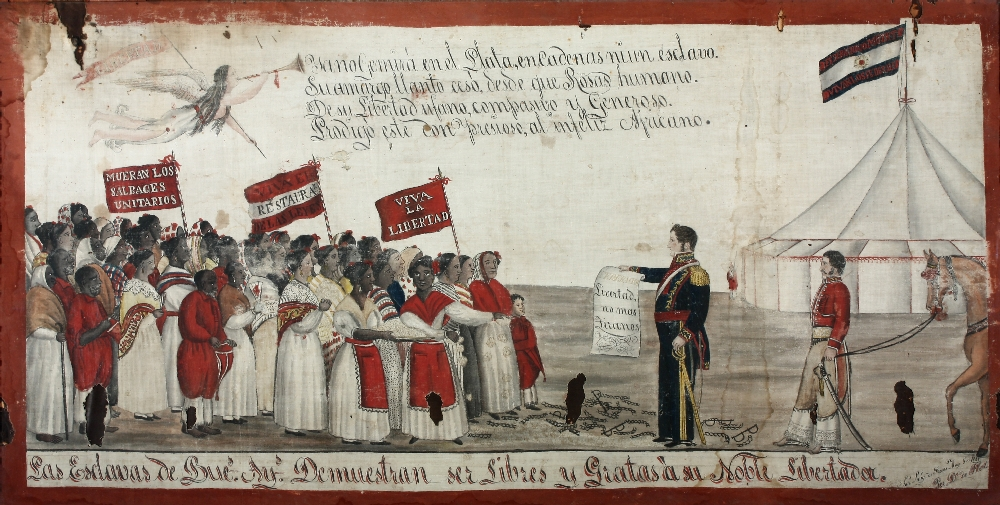
Argentine slaves paying homage to Rosas

Rosas' authority and influence spread far beyond the House of Representatives. He exercised tight control over the bureaucracy as well as his cabinet, stating: "Do not imagine that my Ministers are anything but my Secretaries. I put them in their offices to listen and report, and nothing more". His supporters were rewarded with positions within the state apparatus, and anyone he deemed a threat was purged. Opposition newspapers were burned in public squares. Rosas created an elaborate cult of personality, presenting himself as an almighty and fatherlike figure who protected the people. His portraits were carried in street demonstrations and placed on church altars to be venerated. Rosismo was no longer a mere faction within the Federalist ranks; it had become a political movement. As early as 1829, Rosas had confided to an Uruguayan diplomatic envoy: "I tell you I am not a Federalist, and I have never belonged to that party". During his governorship, he still claimed to have favoured Federalism against Unitarianism, although in practice Federalism had by that time been subsumed into the Rosismo movement.

Rosas established a totalitarian regime, in which the government sought to dictate every aspect of public and private life. It was mandated that the slogan "Death to the Savage Unitarians" be inscribed at the head of all official documents. Anyone on the state payroll—from military officers, priests, to civil servants and teachers—was obliged to wear a red badge with the inscription "Federation or Death". Every male was required to have a "federal look", i.e., to sport a large moustache and sideburns, leading many to wear false moustaches. The red colour—symbol of both the Federalist Party and of Rosismo—became omnipresent in the province of Buenos Aires. Soldiers wore red chiripás (blankets worn as trousers), caps and jackets, and their horses sported red accoutrements. Civilians were also required to wear the colour. A red waistcoat, red badge and red hat band were required for men, while women wore ribbons in that colour and children donned school uniforms based upon Rosismo paradigms. Building exteriors and interiors were also decorated in red.

Most Catholic clergy in Buenos Aires willingly backed Rosas' regime. The Jesuits, the only ones who refused to do so, were expelled from the country. When Rosas slashed expenditures, he cut resources from education, social services, general welfare and public works. The lower social strata in Buenos Aires, which formed the vast majority of its populace, experienced no improvement in the conditions under which they lived. None of the lands confiscated from Indians and Unitarians were turned over to rural workers, including gauchos. Rosas was a slave-owner, and helped revive the slave trade in 1831, but later abolished it in 1839. In 1836, Rosas ended the automatic conscription of the free children of slaves (libertos). Both of these actions resulted in a rise in his popularity among the Afro-Argentine population. He remained popular among blacks and gauchos. Rosas ended the ban on candombles, invited them to hold an all-day dance on Independence Day in 1838, and also occasionally donated to Afro-Argentine mutual aid societies. He employed blacks, patronised their festivities and attended their candombles. Black people experienced a rise in social mobility during the Rosas era, with some blacks having high positions in the secret police and military. After his daughter, Manuela Rosas, attended black dances in 1843, the Unitarians used this to insult the Rosas regime, leading to the Rosista newspaper La Gaceta Mercantil proclaiming that "the savage unitarians" were "unworthy to rub shoulders with the honored pardos and morenos". In October 1853, the Unitarian newspaper La Tribuna blamed Rosas for the black population's refusal to become servants. Afro-Argentines social position declined after the overthrow of the Rosas dictatorship. The gauchos admired his leadership and willingness to fraternise with them to some extent. However, educational opportunities for the black population remained limited and, in 1834 Rosas introduced automatic conscription of all foreign-born libertos.

Rosas pursued a protectionist economic policy. The importation of iron, tinplate manufactures, riding equipment, ponchos, belts, wool or cotton waistbands, coarse woollen cloth, farm products, carriage wheels, tallow candles, and combs was banned, and the tariffs on the importation of coaches, shoes, cordage, clothing, saddles, dried fruits, and alcohol were raised, with no tax on meat exported by Argentine ships. The tobacco-growing and saddlery industries were encouraged, over a hundred Buenos Aires factories thrived, and the Corrientes and Santa Fe shipyards, Córdoba and Tucumán textile and shoemaking industries, Salta cigar manufacturers and artisans, and the Mendoza and San Juan wineries experienced a similar boom in production. This effectively ended the monopoly Buenos Aires held over Argentina's customs and nationalised internal trade. However, the manufacturing sector stagnated and there was no growth in an industrial bourgeoisie, nor was there any redistribution of wealth to the provinces.

Whilst Rosas was a representative of the big ranch-owners, he was the first of Argentina's national populist leaders who appealed to workers, portrayed himself as the champion of Argentine nationalism, and encouraged a limited participation of the Argentine masses in politics. Whilst the Unitarians wanted European immigration and foreign investment, Rosas abandoned plans to encourage European immigration, deliberately defaulted on British loans, and opposed British and French involvement in South America in general.

=== State terrorism ===
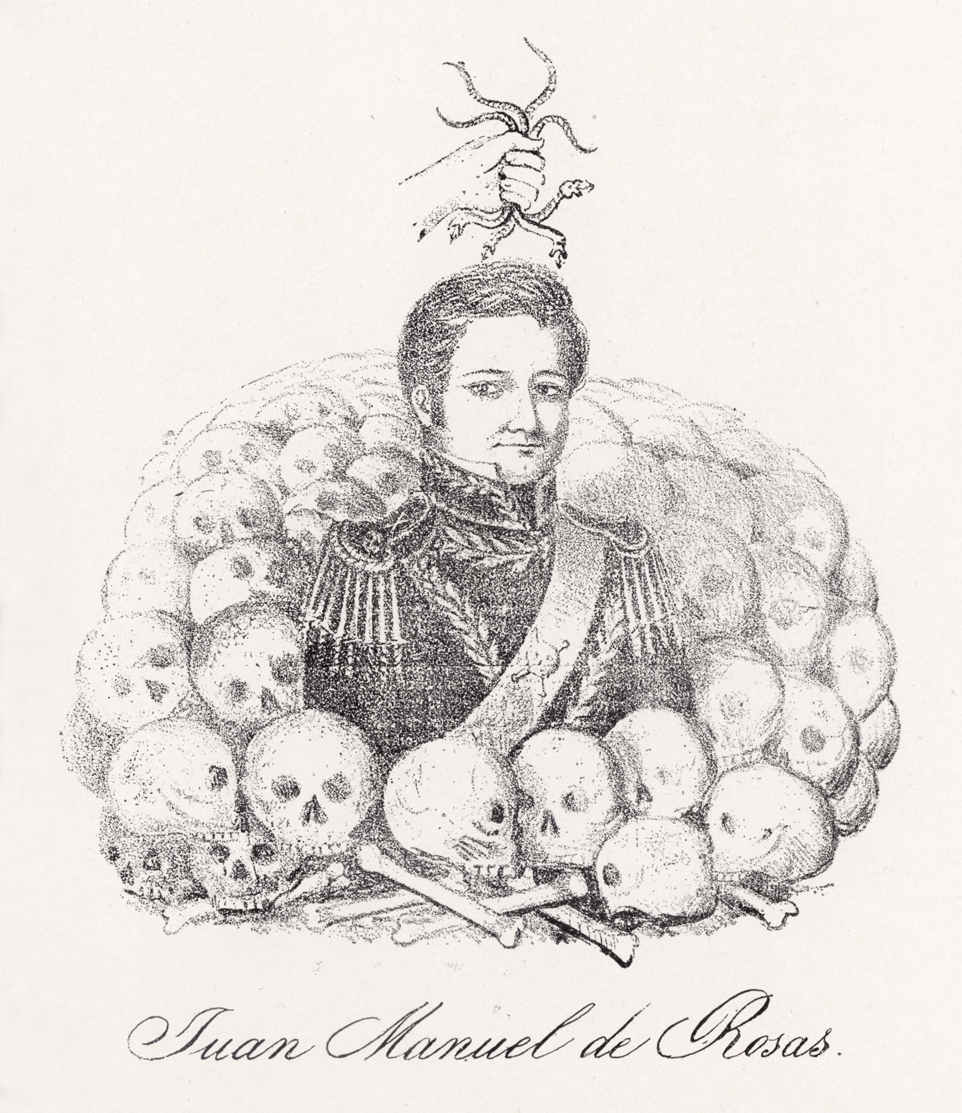
An anti-Rosas drawing published in a newspaper in 1841 or 1842

In addition to purges, banishments and censorship, Rosas took measures against the opposition and anyone else he deemed a threat that historians have considered state terrorism. Terror was a tool used to intimidate dissident voices, to shore up support among his own partisans and to exterminate his foes. His targets were denounced, sometimes inaccurately, as having ties to Unitarians. Those victimised included members of his government and party who were suspected of being insufficiently loyal. If actual opponents were not at hand, the regime found other targets that were punished to make an example. A climate of fear was used to create unquestioning conformity to Rosas' dictates.

State terrorism was carried out by the Mazorca, an armed parapolice unit of the Sociedad Popular Restauradora security agency. The Sociedad Popular Restauradora and the Mazorca were creations of Rosas, who retained tight control over both. The tactics of the mazorqueros included neighborhood sweeps in which houses would be searched and occupants intimidated. Others who fell into their power were arrested, tortured and killed. Killings were generally by shooting, lance-thrusting or throat-slitting. Many were castrated, or had their beards scalped or their tongues cut out. Modern estimates report around 2,000 people were killed from 1829 until 1852.

Although a judicial system still existed in Buenos Aires, Rosas removed any independence the courts might have exercised, either by controlling appointments to the judiciary, or by circumventing their authority entirely. He would sit in judgement over cases, issuing sentences which included fines, service in the army, imprisonment, or execution. The exercise of state terror as a tool of intimidation was restricted to Rosas himself; his subordinates had no control over it. It was used against specific targets, rather than randomly. Terrorism was orchestrated rather than a product of popular zeal, was targeted for effect rather than indiscriminate. Anarchic demonstrations, vigilantism and disorderliness were antithetical to a regime touting a law and order agenda. Foreigners were exempted from abuses, as were people too poor or inconsequential to serve as effective examples. Victims were selected for their usefulness as tools of intimidation.

== Struggle for dominance ==
=== Rebellions and foreign threat ===
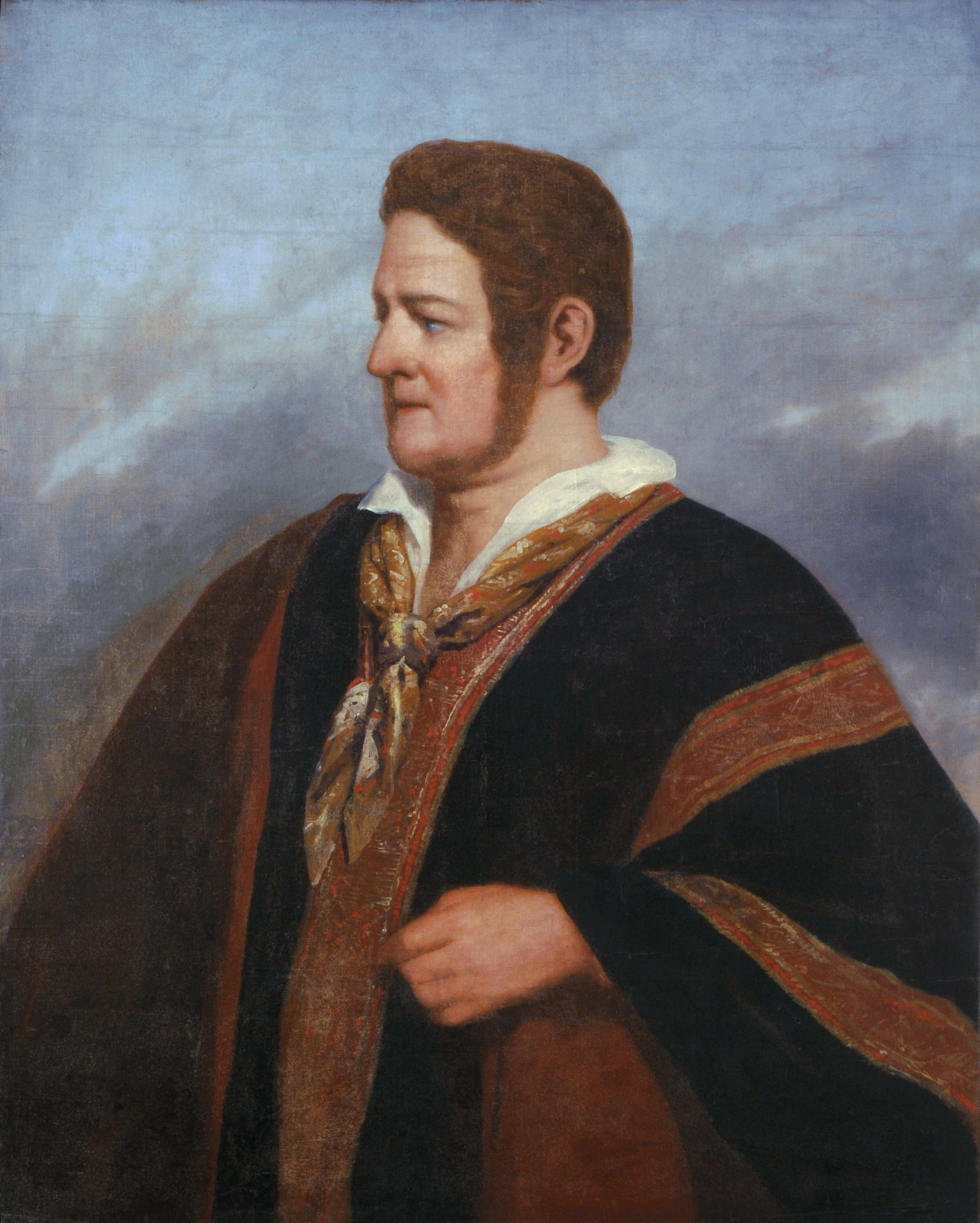
Rosas in gaucho attire, 1842. Oil painting by Raymond Monvoisin

Throughout the late 1830s and early 1840s, Rosas faced a series of major threats to his power. The Unitarians found an ally in Andrés de Santa Cruz, the ruler of the Peru–Bolivian Confederation. Rosas declared war against the Peru–Bolivian Confederation on 19 March 1837, joining the War of the Confederation between Chile and Peru–Bolivia. The Rosista army played a minor role in the conflict, which resulted in the overthrow of Santa Cruz and the dissolution of the Peru–Bolivian Confederation. On 28 March 1838, France declared a blockade of the Port of Buenos Aires, eager to extend its influence over the region. Unable to confront the French, Rosas increased internal repression to forestall potential uprisings against his regime.

The blockade caused severe damage to the economy across all the provinces, as they exported their goods through the port of Buenos Aires. Despite the 1831 Federal Pact, all provinces had long been discontent with the de facto primacy that Buenos Aires province held over them. On 28 February 1839, the province of Corrientes revolted and attacked both Buenos Aires and Entre Ríos provinces. Rosas counterattacked and defeated the rebels, killing their leader, the governor of Corrientes. In June, Rosas uncovered a plot by dissident Rosistas to oust him from power in what became known as the Maza conspiracy. Rosas imprisoned some of the plotters and executed others. Manuel Vicente Maza, president of both the House of Representatives and the Supreme Court, was murdered by Rosas' Mazorca agents within the halls of the parliament on the pretext that his son was involved in the conspiracy. In the countryside, estancieros, including a younger brother of Rosas, revolted, beginning the Rebellion of the South. The rebels attempted to ally with France, but were easily crushed, many losing their lives and properties in the process.

In September 1839, Juan Lavalle returned after ten years in exile. He allied with the governor of Corrientes, which revolted once again, and invaded Buenos Aires province at the head of Unitarian troops armed and supplied by the French. Emboldened by Lavalle's actions, the provinces of Tucumán, Salta, La Rioja, Catamarca and Jujuy formed the Coalition of the North and also rebelled against Buenos Aires. Great Britain intervened on behalf of Rosas, and France lifted the blockade on 29 October 1840. The struggle with his internal enemies was hard-fought. By December 1842, Lavalle had been killed and the rebellious provinces subdued, except for Corrientes, which was only defeated in 1847. Terrorism was also employed on the battlefield, as the Rosistas refused to take prisoners. The defeated men had their throats cut and their heads put on display.

=== Ruler of Argentina ===
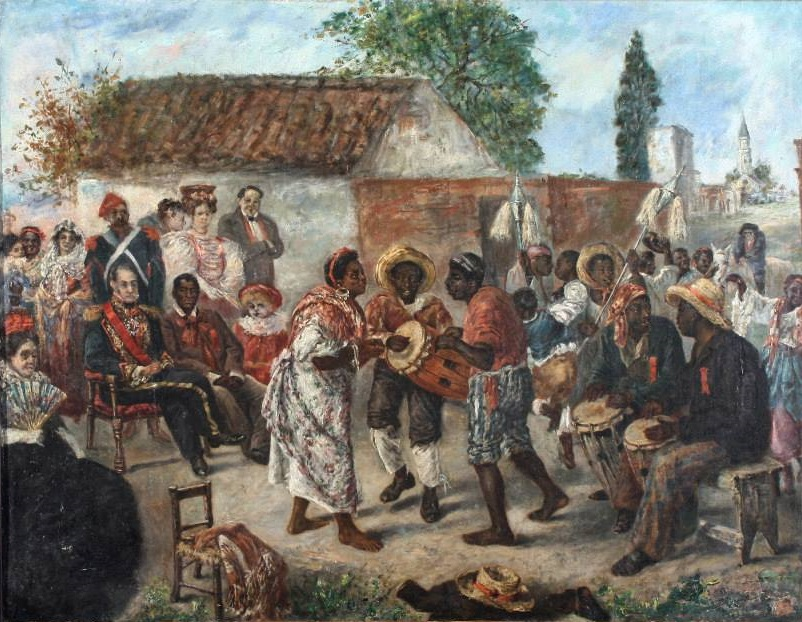
Rosas (seated, left) at a candombe performance, 1845

Around 1845, Rosas managed to establish absolute dominance over the region. His subordinates dominated all of Uruguay, with the exception of Montevideo. He offered help to the separatists of Ragamuffin War in order to seize the situation and possibly obtain control over the former Misiones Orientales territory. He exercised complete control over all aspects of society with the solid backing of the army. Rosas was raised from colonel to brigadier general (the highest army rank) on 18 December 1829. On 12 November 1840 he declined the newly created and higher rank of grand marshal (gran mariscal), which had been bestowed on him by the House of Representatives. The army was led by officers who had backgrounds and values similar to his. Confident of his power, Rosas made some concessions by returning confiscated properties to their owners, disbanding the Mazorca and ending torture and political assassinations. The inhabitants of Buenos Aires still dressed and behaved according to the set of rules Rosas had imposed, but the climate of constant and widespread fear greatly diminished.

When Rosas was elected governor for the first time in 1829, he held no power outside the province of Buenos Aires. There was no national government or national parliament. The former Viceroyalty of the Río de la Plata had been succeeded by the United Provinces of the Río de la Plata, which by 1831, following the Federal Pact and officially from 22 May 1835, had increasingly been known as the Argentine Confederation, or simply, Argentina. Rosas' victory over the other Argentine provinces in the early 1840s turned them into satellites of Buenos Aires. He gradually put in place provincial governors who were either allied or too weak to have real independence, which allowed him to exercise dominance over all the provinces. By 1848, Rosas began calling his government the "government of the confederacy" and the "general government", which would have been inconceivable a few years before. The next year, with acquiescence of the provinces, he named himself "Supreme Head of the Confederacy" and became the indisputable ruler of Argentina.

As Rosas aged and his health declined, the question of who would succeed him became a growing concern among his supporters. His wife Encarnación had died in October 1838 after a long illness. Although devastated by the loss of Encarnación, Rosas exploited her death to raise support for his regime. Not long after, at the age of 47, he began an affair with his fifteen-year-old maid, María Eugenia Castro, with whom he had five illegitimate children. From his marriage to Encarnación, Rosas had two children: Juan Bautista Pedro and Manuela Robustiana. Rosas established a hereditary dictatorship, naming the children from his marriage as his successors, stating that "[t]hey are both worthy children of my beloved Encarnación, and if, God willing, I die, then you will find that they are capable of succeeding me". It is unknown whether Rosas was a closet monarchist. Later during his exile, Rosas declared that Princess Alice of the United Kingdom would be the ideal ruler for his country. Nonetheless, in public he stated that his regime was republican in nature.

== Apogee and downfall ==
=== Anglo-French blockade ===
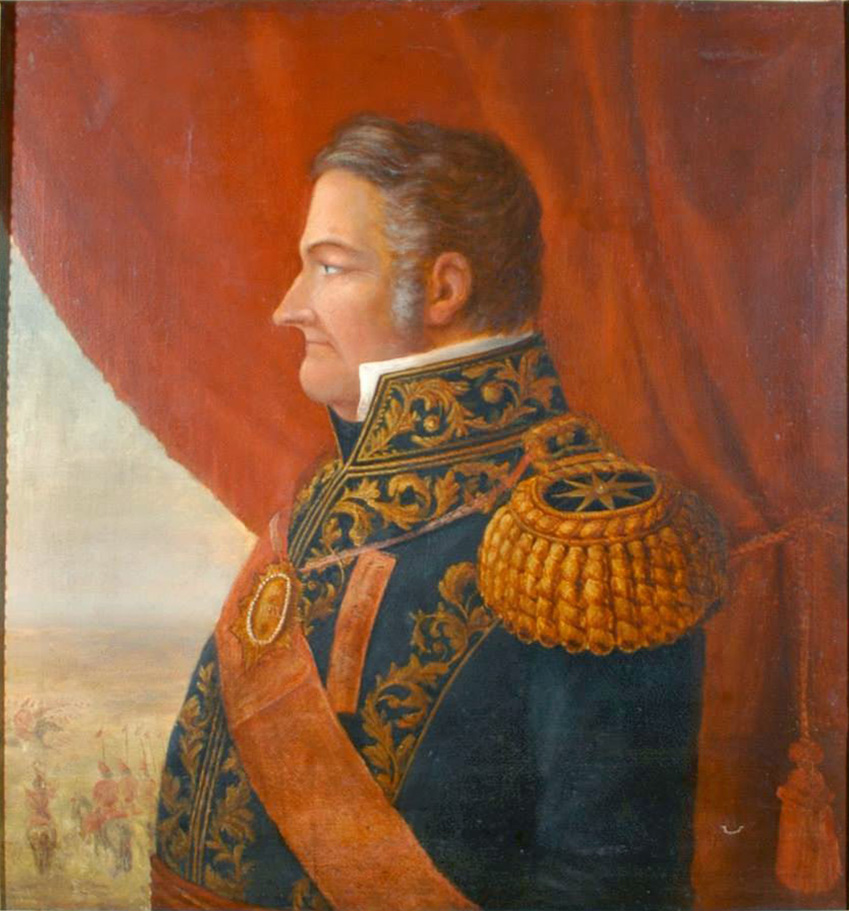
Rosas at age 52, 1845

The breakup of the old Viceroyalty of the Río de la Plata during the 1810s eventually resulted in the emergence of independent nations of Paraguay, Bolivia and Uruguay in the northern portion of the Viceroyalty, while its southern territories coalesced into the United Provinces of the Río de la Plata. Rosas planned to restore, if not all, at least a considerable part of the former borders of the old Viceroyalty of the Río de la Plata. He never recognised the independence of Paraguay and regarded it a rebel Argentine province that would inevitably be reconquered. He sent an army under Manuel Oribe who invaded Uruguay and conquered most of the country, except for its capital Montevideo that endured a long siege starting in 1843. When pressed by the British, Rosas declined to guarantee Uruguayan independence. In South America, all potential foreign threats to Rosas' plans of conquest collapsed, including Gran Colombia and the Peru–Bolivian Confederation, or were troubled by internal turmoil, as was the Empire of Brazil. To reinforce his claims over Uruguay and Paraguay, and maintain his dominance over the Argentine provinces, Rosas blockaded the port of Montevideo and closed the interior rivers to foreign trade.

The loss of trade was unacceptable to Britain and France. On 17 September 1845 both nations established the Anglo-French blockade of the Río de la Plata and enforced the free navigation in the Río de la Plata Basin (or Platine region). Argentina resisted the pressure and fought back to a standstill. This undeclared war caused more economic harm to France and Britain than to Argentina. The British faced increasing pressure at home once they realised that the access gained to the other ports within the Platine region did not compensate for the loss of trade with Buenos Aires. Britain ended all hostilities and lifted the blockade on 15 July 1847, followed by France on 12 June 1848. Rosas had successfully resisted the two most powerful nations on Earth; his standing, and Argentina's, increased among Hispanic American nations. The Venezuelan humanist Andrés Bello, summarizing the prevailing opinion, considered Rosas among "the leading ranks of the great men of America".

Although his prestige was on the rise, Rosas made no serious attempts to further liberalise his regime. Every year he presented his resignation and the pliant House of Representatives predictably declined, claiming that maintaining him in office was vital for the nation's welfare. Rosas also allowed exiled Argentines to return to their homeland, but only because he was so confident of his control and that no one was willing to risk defying him. The execution in August 1848 of the pregnant Camila O'Gorman, charged with a forbidden romance with a priest, caused a backlash throughout the continent. Nonetheless, it served as a clear warning that Rosas had no intention of loosening his grip.

=== Platine War ===
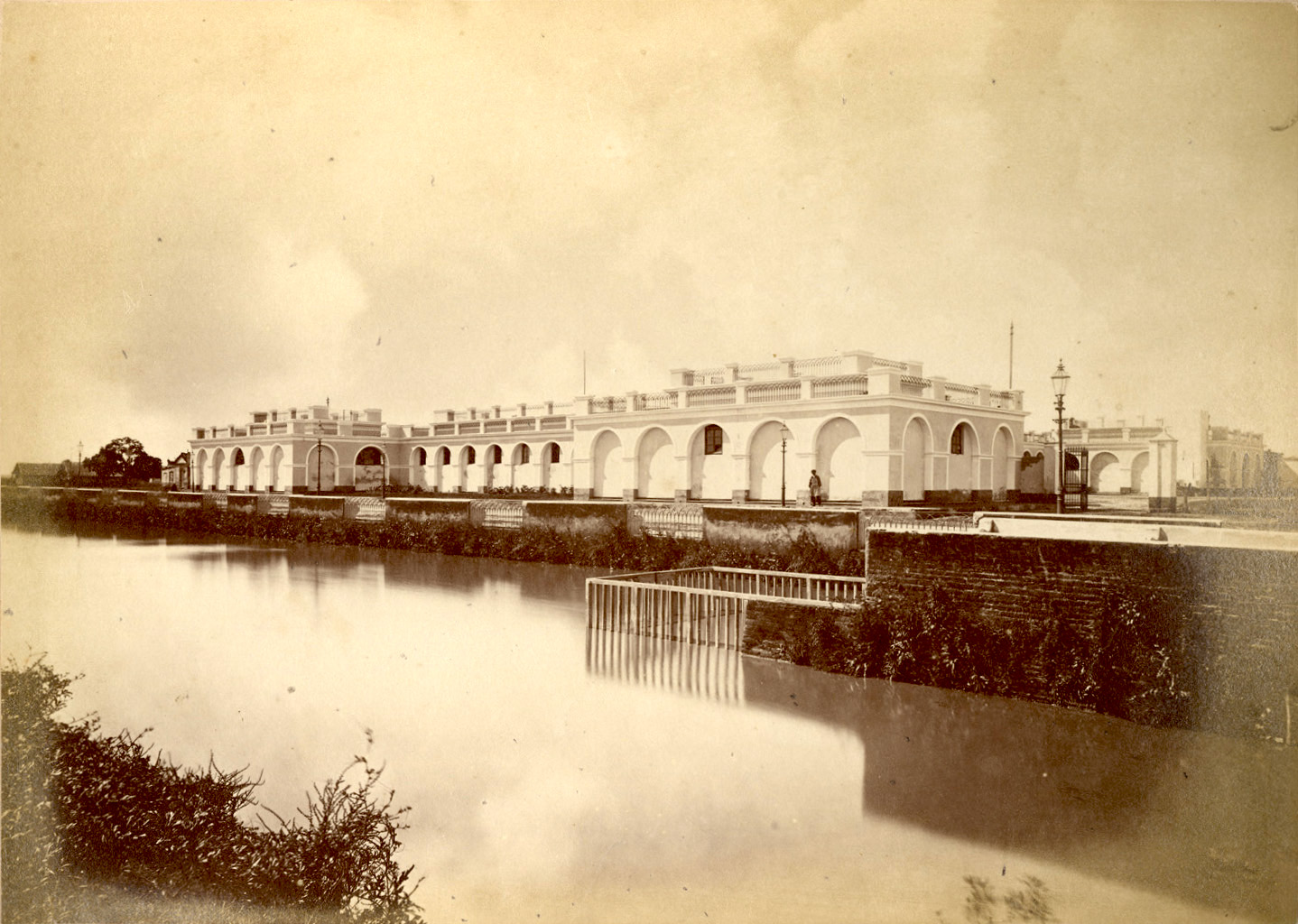
Rosas' residence in Palermo, Buenos Aires, 1876

Rosas failed to acknowledge that discontent was steadily growing throughout the country. Throughout the 1840s he became increasingly secluded in his country house in Palermo, some miles away from Buenos Aires. There he ruled and lived under heavy protection provided by guards and patrols. He declined to meet with his ministers and relied solely on secretaries. His daughter Manuela replaced his wife at his right hand and became the link between Rosas and the outside world. The reason for Rosas' increasing isolation was given by a member of his secretariat: "The dictator is not stupid: he knows the people hate him; he goes in constant fear and always has one eye on the chance to rob and abuse them and the other on making a getaway. He has a horse ready saddled at the door of his office day and night".

Meanwhile, Brazil, now ascendant under Emperor Dom Pedro II, provided support to the Uruguayan government that still held out in Montevideo, as well as to the ambitious Justo José de Urquiza, a caudillo in Entre Ríos who rebelled against Rosas. Once one of Rosas' most trusted lieutenants, Urquiza now claimed to fight for a constitutional government, although his ambition to become head of state was barely disguised. In retaliation, Rosas declared war on Brazil on 18 August 1851, beginning the Platine War. The army under Oribe in Uruguay surrendered to Urquiza in October. With arms and financial aid given by Brazil, Urquiza then marched through Argentine territory heading to Buenos Aires.

Uncharacteristically, Rosas remained passive throughout the conflict, but lost heart once he came to realise that he had fallen into a trap. Even if he defeated Urquiza, his forces would probably be weakened enough to prevent him from challenging the Brazilian army that was ready to invade Argentina. With no other alternative, Rosas remarked: "There is no other way; we have to play for the high stakes and go for everything. Here we are, and from here there is no retreat". After an unsuccessful battle against Urquiza on 3 February 1852, Rosas fled to Buenos Aires. Once there, he disguised himself and boarded a ship that took him to Britain to live in exile. Embittered, he remarked: "It is not the people who have overthrown me. It is the monkeys, the Brazilians". (Note: This comment was a racial nod to the presence of soldiers of African ancestry within Brazilian ranks.)

== Later years ==
=== Exile and death ===
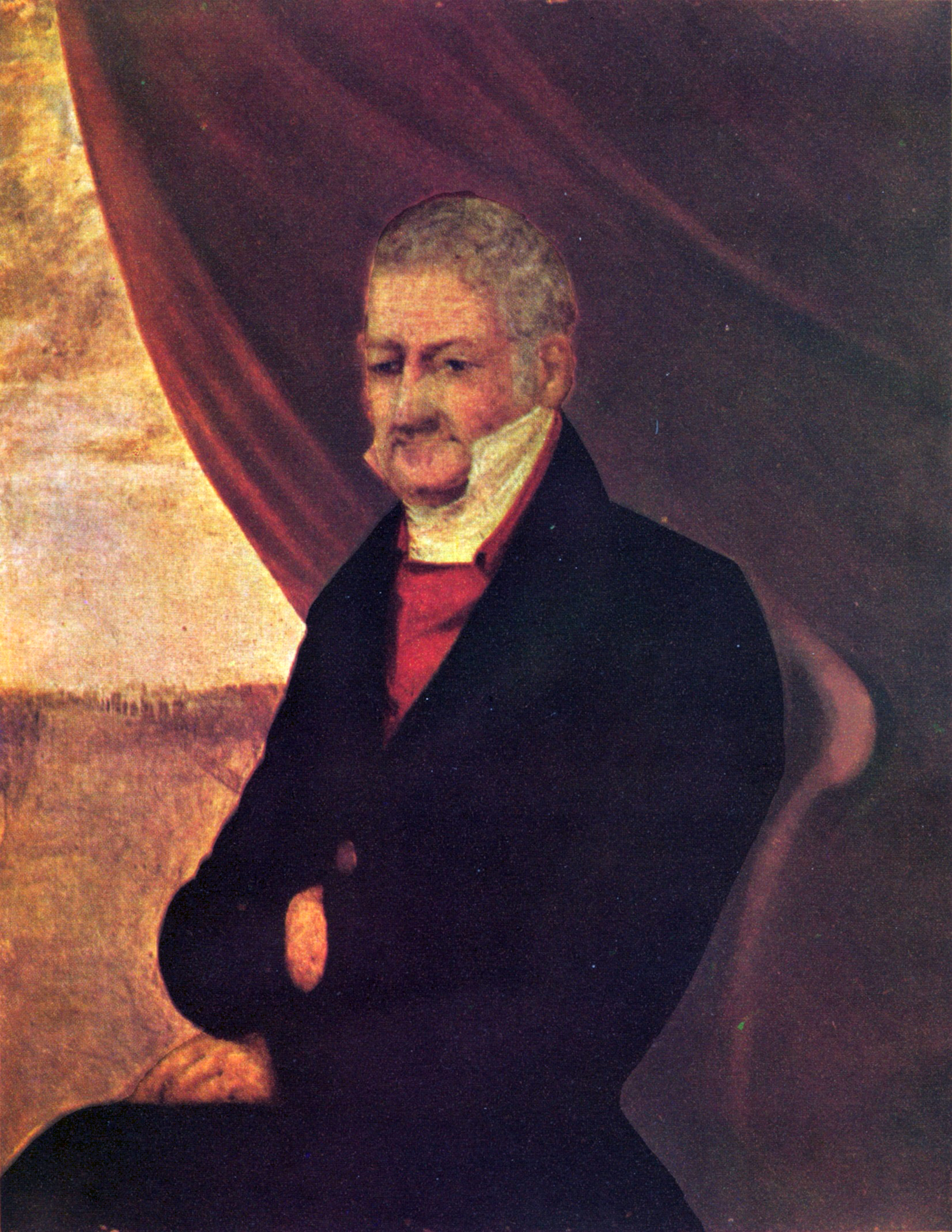
An elderly Rosas during his exile

Rosas arrived in Plymouth in England on 26 April 1852. The British gave him asylum, paid for his travel and welcomed him with a 21-gun salute. These honours were granted because, according to the British Foreign Secretary James Harris, 3rd Earl of Malmesbury, "General Rosas was no common refugee, but one who had shown great distinction and kindness to the British merchants who had traded with his country". Months before his fall, Rosas had arranged with the British chargé d'affaires Captain Robert Gore for protection and asylum in the event of his defeat. Both his children with Encarnación followed him into exile, although Juan Bautista soon returned with his family to Argentina. His daughter Manuela married the son of an old associate of Rosas, an act which the former dictator never forgave. A domineering father, Rosas wanted his daughter to remain devoted to him alone. Although he forbade her from writing or visiting, Manuela remained loyal to him and maintained contact.

The new Argentine government confiscated all of Rosas' properties and tried him as a criminal, later sentencing him to death. Rosas was appalled that most of his friends, supporters and allies abandoned him and became either silent or openly critical of him. Rosismo vanished overnight. "The landed class, supporters and beneficiaries of Rosas, now had to make their peace—and their profits—with his successors. Survival, not allegiance, was their politics", argued Lynch. Urquiza, a one-time ally and later an enemy, reconciled with Rosas and sent him financial assistance, hoping for political support in return—although Rosas had scant political capital left. Rosas followed Argentina's developments while in exile, always hoping for an opportunity to return, but he never again insinuated himself into Argentine affairs.

In exile Rosas was not destitute, but he lived modestly amid financial constraints during the remainder of his life. A very few loyal friends sent him money, but it was never enough. He sold one of his estancias before the confiscation and became a tenant farmer in Swaythling, near Southampton. He employed a housekeeper and two to four labourers, to whom he paid above-average wages. Despite constant concern over his shortage of funds, Rosas found joy in farm life, once remarking: "I now consider myself happy on this farm, living in modest circumstances as you see, earning a living the hard way by the sweat of my brow". A contemporary described him in final years: "He was then eighty, a man still handsome and imposing; his manners were most refined, and the modest environment did nothing to lessen his air of a great lord, inherited from his family". After a walk on a cold day, Rosas caught pneumonia and died at 07:00 on the morning of 14 March 1877. Following a private mass attended by his family and a few friends, he was buried in the town cemetery of Southampton.

== Legacy ==
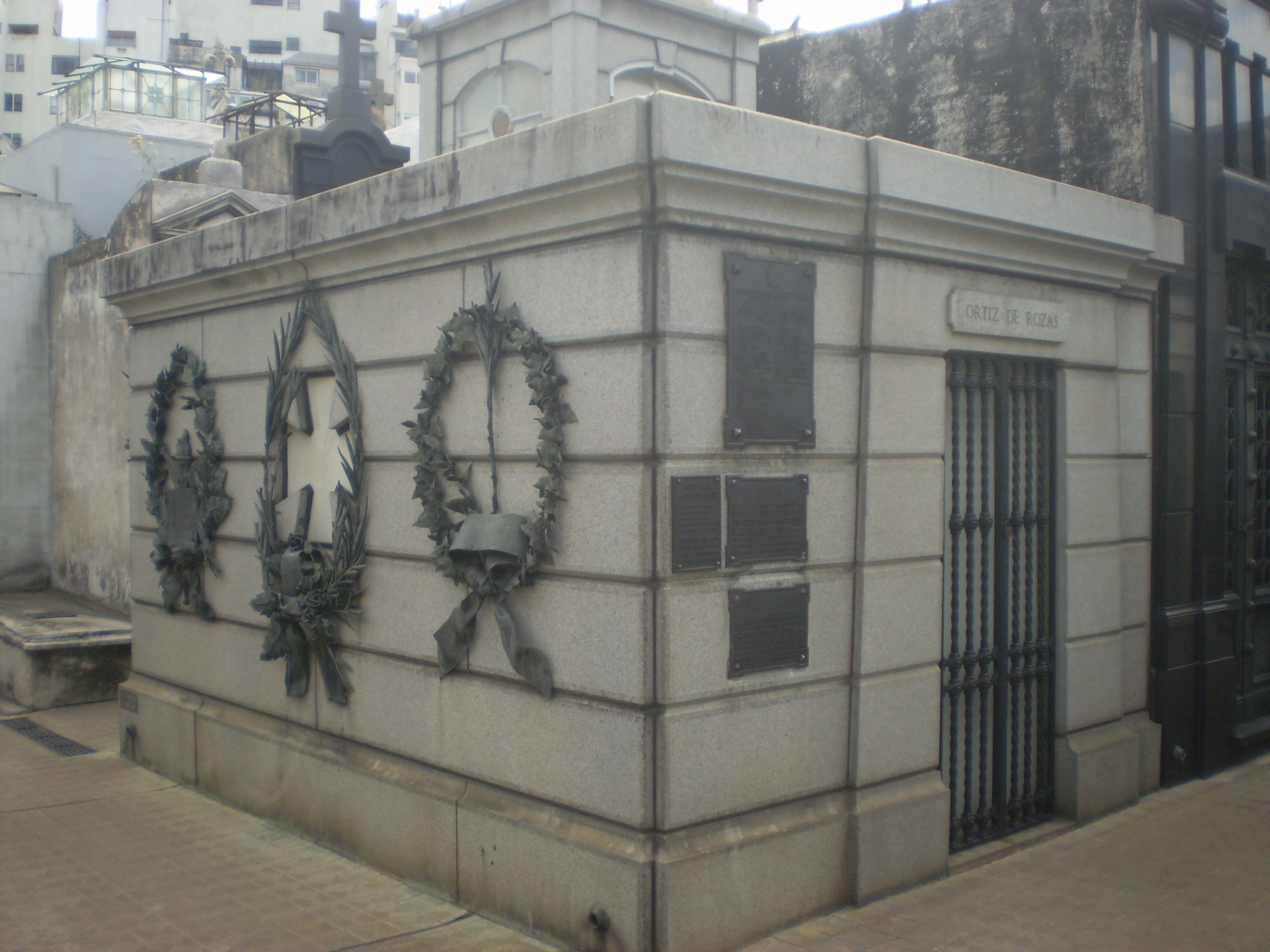
Rosas' family vault at La Recoleta Cemetery

Serious attempts to reassess Rosas' reputation began in the 1880s with the publication of scholarly works by Adolfo Saldías and Ernesto Quesada. Later, a more blatant "Revisionist" movement would flourish under Nacionalismo (Nationalism). Nacionalismo was a political movement that appeared in Argentina in the 1920s and reached its apex in the 1930s. It was the Argentine equivalent of the authoritarian ideologies that arose during the same period, such as Nazism, Fascism and Integralism. Argentine Nationalism was an authoritarian, anti-Semitic, racist and misogynistic political movement with support for racially based pseudo-scientific theories such as eugenics. Revisionismo (Revisionism) was the historiographical wing of Argentine Nacionalismo. The main goal of Argentine Nacionalismo was to establish a national dictatorship. For the Nacionalismo movement, Rosas and his regime were idealised and portrayed as paragons of governmental virtue. Revisionismo served as a useful tool, as the main purpose of the revisionists within the Nacionalismo agenda was to rehabilitate Rosas' image.

Despite a decades-long struggle, Revisionismo failed to be taken seriously. According to Michael Goebel, the revisionists had a "lack of interest in scholarly standards" and were known for "their institutional marginality in the intellectual field". They also never succeeded in changing mainstream views regarding Rosas. William Spence Robertson said in 1930: "Among the enigmatical personages of the 'Age of Dictators' in South America none played a more spectacular role than the Argentine dictator, Juan Manuel de Rosas, whose gigantic and ominous figure bestrode the Plata River for more than twenty years. So despotic was his power that Argentine writers have themselves styled this age of their history as 'The Tyranny of Rosas'." In 1961, William Dusenberry said: "Rosas is a negative memory in Argentina. He left behind him the black legend of Argentine history—a legend which Argentines in general wish to forget. There is no monument to him in the entire nation; no park, plaza, or street bears his name".

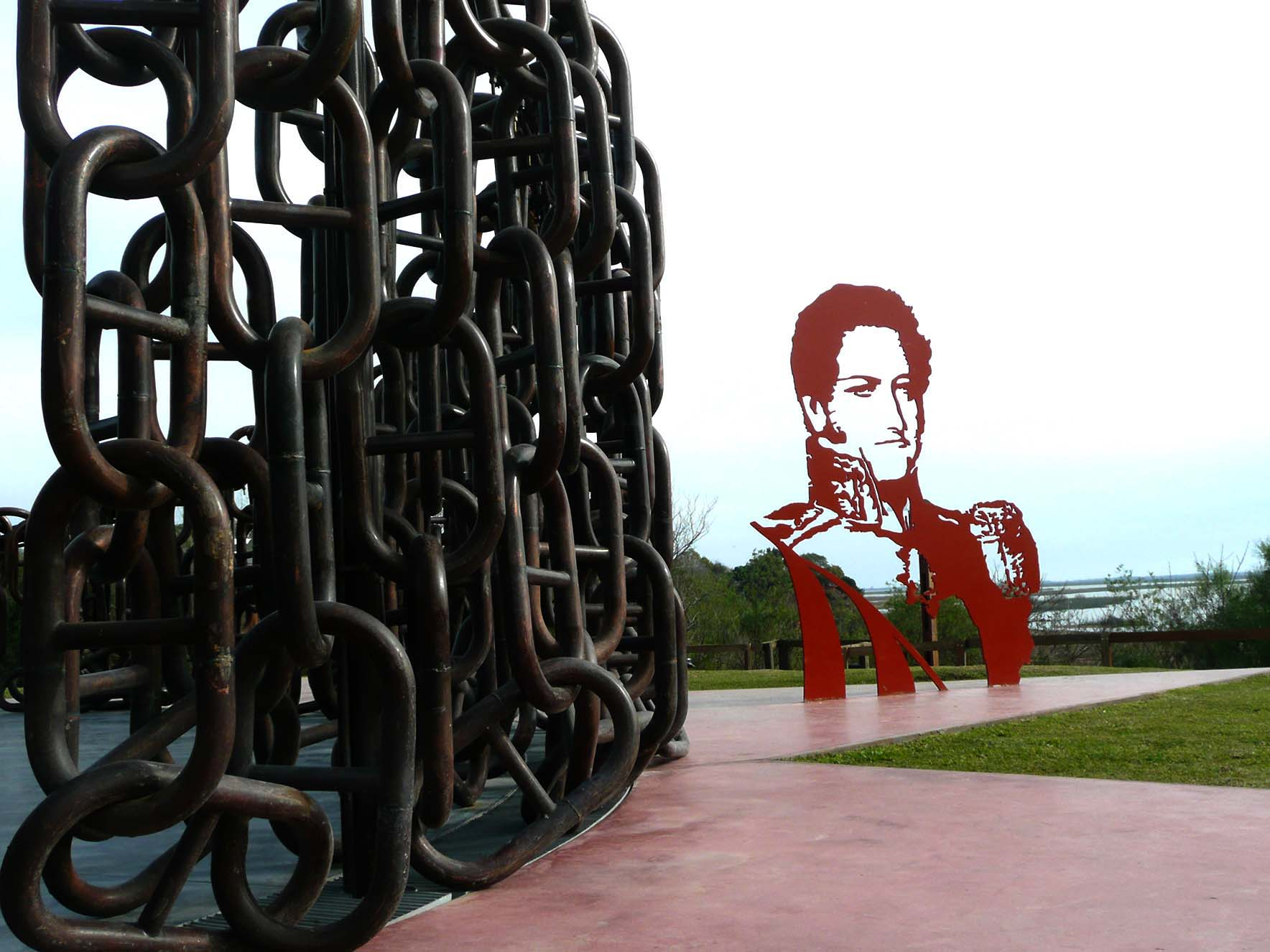
Sculpture with the image of Rosas at the Monument to the Battle of Vuelta de Obligado

In the 1980s, Argentina was a fractured, deeply divided nation, having faced military dictatorships, severe economic crises and a defeat in the Falklands War. President Carlos Menem decided to repatriate Rosas' remains and take advantage of the occasion to unite the Argentines. Menem believed that if the Argentines could forgive Rosas and his regime, they might do the same regarding the more recent and vividly remembered past. On 30 September 1989, an elaborate and enormous cortege organised by the government was held, after which the remains of the Argentine ruler were interred in his family vault at La Recoleta Cemetery, Buenos Aires. A week after the repatriation Menem felt able to pardon nearly 300 military personnel convicted of abuses in the Dirty War. Closely allied with neorevisionists, Menem (and his fellow Peronist presidential successors Néstor Kirchner and Cristina Fernández de Kirchner) have honoured Rosas on banknotes, postage stamps and monuments, causing mixed reactions among the public. Rosas remains a controversial figure among Argentines, who "have long been fascinated and outraged" by him, as historian John Lynch noted.

== See also ==
- The Slaughter Yard

== Sources ==
- Bassi, Angel C. (1942). El Tirano Rosas (in Spanish). Buenos Aires: Editorial Claridad.
- Bethell, Leslie (1993). Argentina since independence. Cambridge: Cambridge University Press. ISBN 0-521-43376-2.
- Bilbao, Manuel (1919). Historia de Rosas (in Spanish). Buenos Aires: Casa Vaccaro.
- Calabrese, Humberto (1975). Juan Manuel de Rosas (in Spanish). La Plata: Instituto Cardenal Cisneros.
- Castro, Donald S. (2001). The Afro-Argentine in Argentine Culture: El Negro Del Acordeón. Lewiston, New York: Edwin Mellen Press. ISBN 0-7734-7389-0.
- Cevasco, Aníbal César (2006). Argentina violenta (in Spanish). Los Angeles: Dunken. ISBN 987-02-1922-5.
- Chamosa, Oscar (2010). The Argentine Folklore Movement: Sugar Elites, Criollo Workers, and the Politics of Cultural Nationalism, 1900–1955. Tucson: University of Arizona Press. ISBN 978-0-8165-2847-9.
- Clayton, Lawrence A.; Conniff, Michael L. (2005). A History of Modern Latin America (2 ed.). Belmont, California: Thomson Learning Academic Resource Center. ISBN 0-534-62158-9.
- Crow, John Armstrong (1980). The Epic of Latin America (3 ed.). Los Angeles: University of California Press. ISBN 0-520-03776-6.
- Darwin, Charles (2008). The Voyage of the Beagle. New York: Cosimo. ISBN 978-1-60520-565-6.
- Deutsch, Sandra McGee; Dolkart, Ronald H. (1993). The Argentine Right: Its History and Intellectual Origins, 1910 to the Present. Wilmington, Delaware: Scholarly Resources. ISBN 0-8420-2418-2.
- Dusenberry, William (November 1961). "Juan Manuel de Rosas as Viewed by Contemporary American Diplomats". The Hispanic American Historical Review. 41 (4). Durham, North Carolina: Duke University Press: 495–514. doi:10.1215/00182168-41.4.495.
- Edwards, Todd L. (2008). Argentina: A Global Studies Handbook. Santa Barbara: ABC-CLIO. ISBN 978-1-85109-986-3.
- Fernandez, Fernando (1983). El Dictador (in Spanish). Buenos Aires: Corregidor.
- Geisler, Michael E. (2005). National Symbols, Fractured Identities: Contesting The National Narrative. Lebanon, New Hampshire: University Press of New England. ISBN 1-58465-436-8.
- Goebel, Michael (2011). Argentina's Partisan Past: Nationalism and the Politics of History. Liverpool: Liverpool University Press. ISBN 978-1-84631-238-0.
- Graham, Robert Bontine Cunninghame (1933). Portrait of a dictator. London: William Heinemann.
- Hanway, Nancy . (2003). Embodying Argentina: Body, Space and Nation in 19th Century Narrative. Jefferson, North Carolina: McFarland & Company. ISBN 0-7864-1457-X.
- Hooker, Terry D. (2008). The Paraguayan War. Nottingham: Foundry Books. ISBN 978-1-901543-15-5.
- Hudson, William Henry (1918). Far Away and Long Ago. London and Toronto: J.M. Dent and Sons, Ltd.
- Kraay, Hendrik; Whigham, Thomas (2004). I die with my country: perspectives on the Paraguayan War, 1864–1870. Dexter, Michigan: Thomson-Shore. ISBN 978-0-8032-2762-0.
- Lanctot, Brendan (2014). Beyond Civilization and Barbarism: Culture and Politics in Postrevolutionary Argentina. Lanham, Maryland: Bucknell University Press/Rowman & Littlefield. ISBN 978-1-61148-545-5.
- Leuchars, Chris (2002). To the bitter end: Paraguay and the War of the Triple Alliance. Westport, Connecticut: Greenwood Press. ISBN 0-313-32365-8.
- Lewis, Daniel K. (2003). The History of Argentina. New York: Palgrave Macmillan. ISBN 1-4039-6254-5.
- Lewis, Paul H. (2006). Authoritarian Regimes in Latin America: Dictators, Despots, And Tyrants. Lanham, Maryland: Rowman & Littlefield Publishers. ISBN 0-7425-3739-0.
- Loveman, Brian (1999). For la Patria: Politics and the Armed Forces in Latin America. Wilmington, Delaware: Scholarly Resources. ISBN 0-8420-2772-6.
- Lynch, John (1981). Argentine dictator: Juan Manuel De Rosas, 1829–1852. Oxford: Oxford University Press. ISBN 0-19-821129-5.
- Lynch, John (2001). Argentine Caudillo: Juan Manuel de Rosas (2 ed.). Wilmington, Delaware: Scholarly Resources. ISBN 0-8420-2897-8.
- Meade, Teresa A. (2016). A History of Modern Latin America: 1800 to the Present (2 ed.). Malden, Massachusetts: John Wiley & Sons. ISBN 978-1-118-77248-5.
- Mejía, José María Ramos (2001). Rosas y su tiempo (in Spanish). Buenos Aires: Emecé.
- Miller, Nicola (1999). In the Shadow of the State: Intellectuals and the Quest for National Identity in Twentieth-century Spanish America. London: Verso. ISBN 1-85984-738-2.
- Moreno, Isidoro J. Ruiz (1999). Alianza contra Rosas (in Spanish). Buenos Aires: Academia Nacional de la Historia. ISBN 950-9843-52-0.
- Nállim, Jorge (2012). Transformations and Crisis of Liberalism in Argentina, 1930–1955. Pittsburgh: University of Pittsburgh Press. ISBN 978-0-8229-6203-8.
- Pradère, Juan A. (1970). Juan Manuel de Rosas, su iconografía (in Spanish). Vol. 1. Buenos Aires: Editorial Oriente.
- Quesada, María Sáenz (2001). La Argentina: Historia del país y de su gente (in Spanish). Buenos Aires: Editorial Sudamericana. ISBN 950-07-1877-4.
- Rein, Mónica Esti (1998). Politics and Education in Argentina: 1946–1962. New York: M. E. Sharpe. ISBN 0-7656-0209-1.
- Robertson, William Spence (May 1930). "Foreign Estimates of the Argentine Dictator, Juan Manuel de Rosas". The Hispanic American Historical Review. 10 (2). Duke University Press.
- Rock, David (1987). Argentina, 1516–1987: From Spanish Colonization to Alfonsín. Los Angeles: University of California Press. ISBN 0-520-06178-0.
- Rock, David (1995). Authoritarian Argentina: The Nationalist Movement, Its History and Its Impact. Berkeley and Los Angeles: University of California Press. ISBN 0-520-20352-6.
- Rotker, Susana (2002). Captive Women: Oblivion and Memory in Argentina. Minneapolis: University of Minnesota Press. ISBN 0-8166-4029-7.
- Sagastizábal, Leandro de, ed. (2000). La Configuración de la República Independiente, 1810–1914. Nueva Historia de la Nación Argentina (in Spanish). Vol. V. Buenos Aires: Editorial Planeta Argentina/Academia Nacional de la Historia. ISBN 950-49-0249-9.
- Sala de Representantes de la Provincia de Buenos Aires (1842). Rasgos de la vida publica de S. E. el sr. brigadier general d. Juan Manuel de Rosas (in Spanish). Buenos Aires: Imprenta del Estado.
- Shumway, Jeffrey M. (2004). ""Sometimes Knowing How to Forget Is Also Having Memory": The Repatriation of Juan Manuel de Rosas and the Healing of Argentina". In Johnson, Lyman L. (ed.). Death, Dismemberment, and Memory: Body Politics in Latin America. Albuquerque: University of New Mexico Press. ISBN 0-8263-3200-5.
- Shumway, Jeffrey (30 September 2013). "Juan Manuel de Rosas". Oxford Bibliographies. Oxford University Press. doi:10.1093/OBO/9780199766581-0069. Archived from the original on 2 February 2017.
- Shumway, Nicolas (1993). The Invention of Argentina. Los Angeles: University of California Press. ISBN 978-0-520-08284-7.
- Szuchman, Mark D.; Brown, Jonathan Charles (1994). Revolution and Restoration: The Rearrangement of Power in Argentina, 1776–1860. Lincoln: University of Nebraska Press. ISBN 0-8032-4228-X.
- Trias, Vivian (1970). Juan Manuel de Rosas (in Spanish). Montevideo: Ediciones de la Banda Oriental.
- Whigham, Thomas L. (2002). The Paraguayan War: Causes and early conduct. Vol. 1. Lincoln: University of Nebraska Press. ISBN 978-0-8032-4786-4.

Political offices
Preceded by Juan José Viamonte	Governor of Buenos Aires Province (Head of State of Argentina); 1829–1832	Succeeded by Juan Ramón Balcarce
Preceded by Manuel Vicente Maza	Governor of Buenos Aires Province (Head of State of Argentina); 1835–1852	Succeeded by Justo José de Urquiza
