= Historiography of Juan Manuel de Rosas =

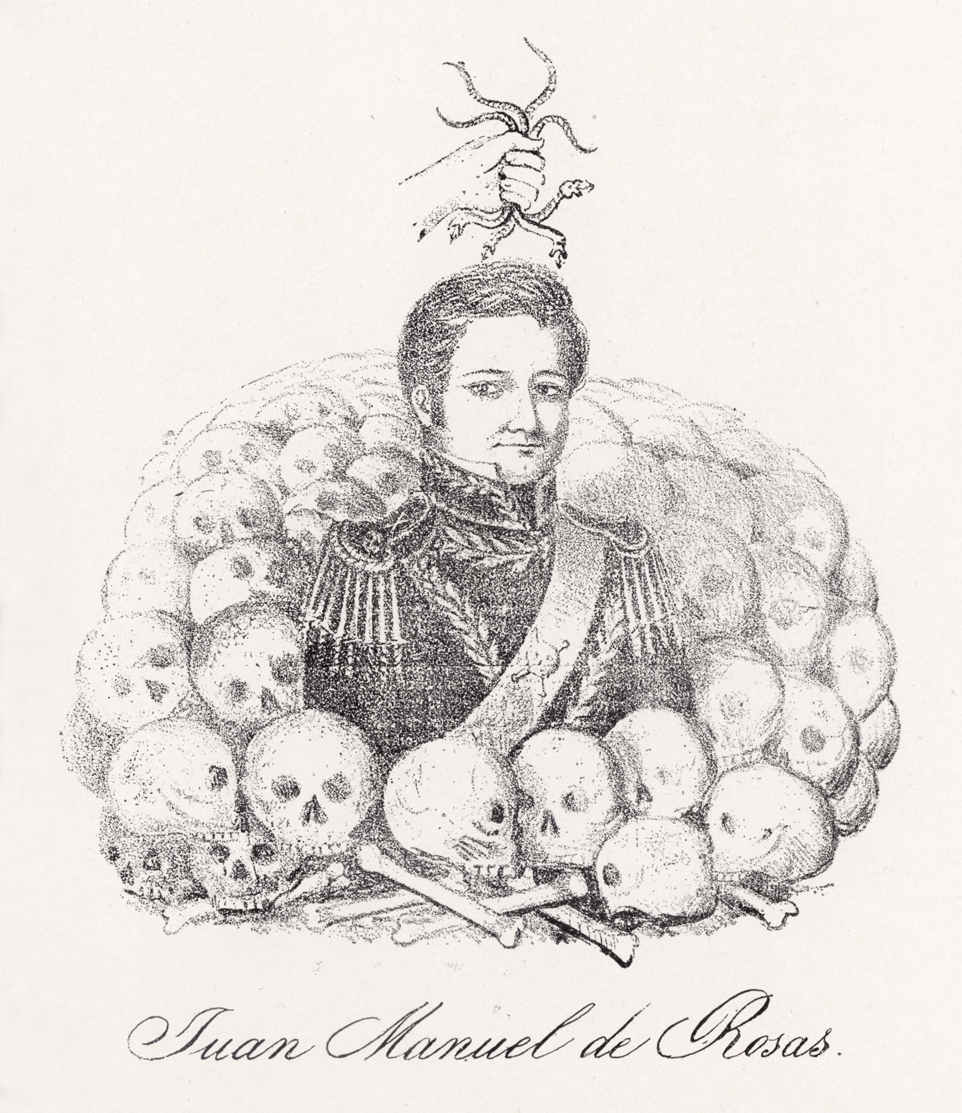
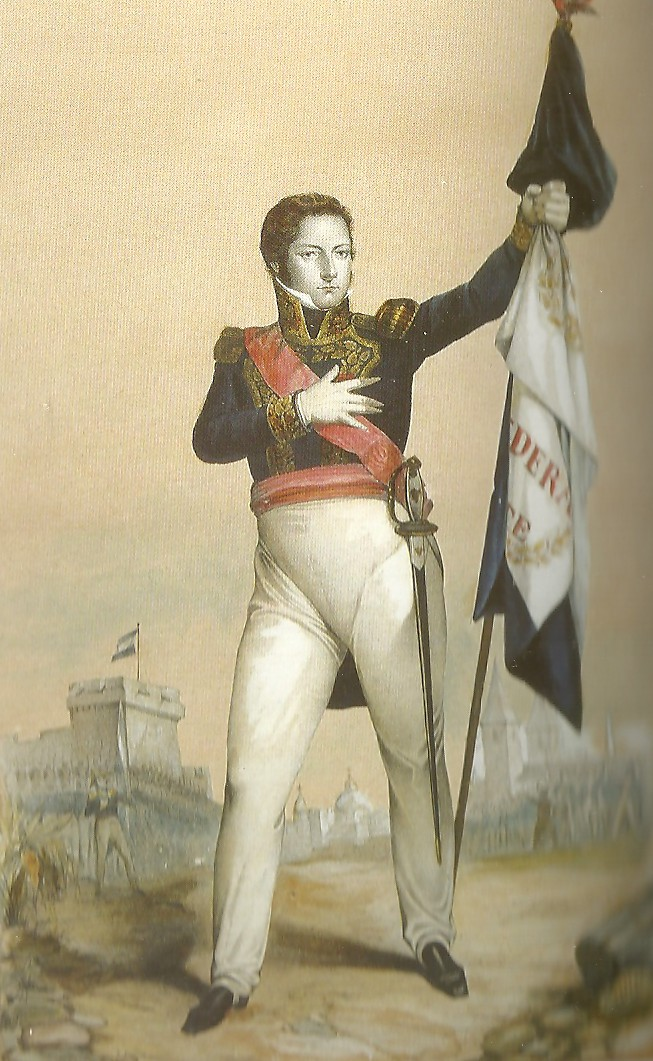
Left: A 19th-century depiction of Juan Manuel de Rosas, surrounded by skulls Right: Portrait of Juan Manuel de Rosas holding the flag of the Argentine Confederation

The historiography of Juan Manuel de Rosas is highly controversial. Most Argentine historians take an approach either for or against him, a dispute that has influenced much of the entire historiography of Argentina.

== Contemporary descriptions ==
Rosas' government of Argentina, during the period of the civil wars, attracted wide criticism. Most leaders of the Unitarian Party exiled themselves to other countries during Rosas' rule. Domingo Faustino Sarmiento, living in Chile, wrote Facundo, a biography of Facundo Quiroga whose real intention was to attack Rosas.

Most Unitarians established themselves in Montevideo. In their writings they criticized Rosas, calling him a ruthless dictator and accusing him of many crimes. These statements were not intended for merely local effect but were designed to promote a European intervention in the conflict. José Rivera Indarte wrote a work called Blood Tables (Tablas de Sangre) which was published in Europe. It was intended to be a complete list of the known victims of Rosas. It attributed more than 22,000 deaths to his government. The Argentine politician Manuel Moreno considered this work to be libel. The reports from Montevideo were echoed in France, as many French citizens resided in Montevideo at that time. Alexandre Dumas wrote the novel Montevideo, or the New Troy based on the reports of Melchor Pacheco. Adolphe Thiers urged François Guizot to intervene in the conflict. On its own initiative France imposed a blockade of the Río de la Plata between 1838 and 1840, which was followed in 1845 by a joint blockade with Great Britain.

The intervention by the European powers won sympathy for Rosas from other South Americans, who saw him as a fellow American standing against powerful foreign aggressors. He was supported by Francisco Antonio Pinto, José Ballivián, and many international newspapers. Some of those newspapers were the American New York Sun (5 August 1845) and New York Herald (7 September 1845), the Brazilians O Brado de Amazonas (9 August 1845) and O Sentinella da Monarchia (20 August 1845) and the Chilean El Tiempo (15 August 1845). The liberator José de San Martín, who was living in France, corresponded with Rosas, offering his full support, both against the Europeans and the Unitarians. San Martín showed his respect by bequeathing his sword to Rosas.

== Later descriptions ==
Rosas was deposed by Justo José de Urquiza in 1852, in the battle of Caseros, and Buenos Aires seceded from the Argentine Confederation later in the year. Rosas moved into exile in Southampton. The Unitarians confiscated all his properties and repudiated him in a variety of ways. José Mármol wrote the novel Amalia, the first Argentine novel, and included several criticisms to Rosas, such as "not even the dust of your bones the America will have". However, such authors cannot be considered exclusively from the perspectives of historiography or the history of ideas, as they were politically active people, even with main roles in the political struggles of their time; and their works were used as tools to advertise their ideas. Most documents of the time were burned during the aftermath of Caseros. The legislature of Buenos Aires charged him with High treason in 1857; Nicanor Arbarellos supported his vote with the following speech:

Rosas, sir, that tyrant, that barbarian, even if barbarian and cruel, was not considered as such by the European and civilized nations, and that judgment of the European and civilized nations, moved to posterity, will hold in doubt, at least, that barbarian and execrable tyranny that Rosas exercised among us. It's needed, then, to mark with a legislative sanction declaring him guilty of lèse majesté so at least this point is marked in history, and it is seen that the most potent court, which is the popular court, which is the voice of the sovereign peoples by us represented, throws to the monster the anathema calling him traitor and guilty of lèse majesté. Judgments like those must not be left for history.

What will be said, what might be said in history when it's seen that the civilized nations of the world, for whom we are but just a point, have acknowledged in this tyrant a being worthy to deal with them? That England has returned his cannons taken in war action, and saluted his bloody and innocent-blood stained flag with a 21-gun salute? This fact, known by history, would be a great counterweight, Sir, if we leave Rosas without this sanction. The France itself, which started the crusade that was shared by general Lavalle, in its due time also abandoned him, dealt with Rosas and saluted his flag with a 21-gun salute. I ask, Sir, if this fact won't erase from history everything we may say, if we leave this monster that decimated us for so many years without a sanction.

The judgment of Rosas must not be left to history, as some people desire. It's clear that it can't be left to history the judgment of the tyrant Rosas. Let's throw to Rosas this anathema, which perhaps can be the only one to harm him in history, because otherwise his tyranny will always be doubtful, as well as his crimes! What will be said in history, sir? And this is sad to tell, what will be said in history when it is said that the brave Admiral Brown, the hero of the Navy of the Independence war, was the admiral who defended the tyranny of Rosas? What will be said in history without this anathema, when it is said that this man who contributed with his glories and talents to give shine to the Sun of May, that the other deputy referenced in his speech, when it is said that General San Martín, the conqueror of the Andes, the father of the Argentine glories, made him the greatest tribute that can be given to a soldier by handing him his sword? Will this be believed, sir, if we don't throw an anathema to the tyrant Rosas? Will this man be known as he is in 20 or 50 years, if we want to go further, when it is known that Brown and San Martín were loyal to him and gave him the most respectful tributes, along with France and England?

No, sir: they will say, the savage unitarians, his enemies, lied. He has not been a tyrant: far from that, he has been a great man, a great general. It's needed to throw without doubts this anathema to the monster. If at least we had imititated the English people, who dragged the corpse of Cromwell across the streets of London, and had dragged Rosas across the streets of Buenos Aires! I support, Mr. President, the project. If the judgment of Rosas was left to the judgment of history, we won't get Rosas to be condemned as a tyrant, but perhaps he may be in it the greatest and most glorious of Argentines. (Note: Spanish: Rosas, señor, ese tirano, ese bárbaro, así bárbaro y cruel, no era considerado lo mismo por las naciones europeas y civilizadas, y ese juicio de las naciones europeas y civilizadas, pasando a la posteridad, pondrá en duda, cuando menos, esa tiranía bárbara y execrable que Rosas ejerció entre nosotros. Es necesario, pues, marcar con una sanción legislativa declarándole reo de lesa patria para que siquiera quede marcado este punto en la historia, y se vea que el tribunal más potente, que es el tribunal popular, que es la voz del pueblo soberano por nosotros representado, lanza al monstruo el anatema llamándole traidor y reo de lesa patria... Juicios como éstos no deben dejarse a la historia... ¿Qué se dirá, qué se podrá decir en la historia cuando se viere que las naciones civilizadas del mundo, para quien nosotros somos un punto... han reconocido en ese tirano un ser digno de tratar con ellos?, ¿que la Inglaterra le ha devuelto sus cañones tomados en acción de guerra, y saludado su pabellón sangriento y manchado con sangre inocente con la salva de 21 cañonazos?... Este hecho conocido en la historia, sería un gran contrapeso, señor, si dejamos a Rosas sin este fallo. La Francia misma, que inició la cruzada en que figuraba el general Lavalle, a su tiempo también lo abandonó, trató con Rosas y saludó su pabellón con 21 cañonazos... Yo pregunto, señor, si este hecho no borrará en la historia todo lo que podamos decir, si dejamos sin un fallo a este monstruo que nos ha diezmado por tantos años... No se puede librar el juicio de Rosas a la historia, como quieren algunos... Es evidente que no puede librarse a la historia el fallo del tirano Rosas... ¡Lancemos sobre Rosas este anatema, que tal vez sea el único que puede hacerle mal en la historia, porque de otro modo ha de ser dudosa siempre su tiranía y también sus crímenes... ¿Qué se dirá en la historia, señor?, y esto sí que es hasta triste decirlo, ¿qué se dirá en la historia cuando se diga que el valiente general Brown, el héroe de la marina en la guerra de la independencia, era el almirante que defendió los derechos de Rosas? ¿Qué se dirá en la historia sin este anatema, cuando se diga que este hombre que contribuyó con sus glorias y talentos a dar brillo a ese sol de Mayo, que el señor diputado recordaba en su discurso, cuando se diga que el general San Martín, el vencedor de los Andes, el padre de las glorias argentinas, le hizo el homenaje más grandioso que puede hacer un militar legándole su espada? ¿Se creerá esto, señor, si no lanzamos un anatema contra el tirano Rosas? ¿Se creerá dentro de 20 años o de 50, si se quiere ir más lejos, a ese hombre tal como es, cuando se sepa que Brown y San Martín le servían fieles y le rendían los homenajes más respetuosos a la par de la Francia y de la Inglaterra? No, señor: dirán, los salvajes unitarios, sus enemigos, mentían. No ha sido un tirano: lejos de eso ha sido un gran hombre, un gran general. Es preciso lanzar sin duda ninguna ese anatema sobre el monstruo... ¡Ojalá hubiéramos imitado al pueblo inglés que arrastró por las calles de Londres el cadáver de Cromwell, y hubiéramos arrastrado a Rosas por las calles de Buenos Aires!... Yo he de estar, señor Presidente, por el proyecto. Si el juicio de Rosas lo librásemos al fallo de la historia, no conseguiremos que Rosas sea condenado como tirano, y sí tal vez que fuese en ella el más grande y el más glorioso de los argentinos.)

A notable exception to this trend was Juan Bautista Alberdi, who was among the Unitarian expatriates in Montevideo and attacked Rosas during his rule. He met with him during the latter's exile in England in 1857, an event which changed his mind into supporting him and even led to their becoming friends. Alberdi would condemn the aforementioned sanction against Rosas, lauded that he never plotted to regain power, compared the barbarism attributed to him with the contemporary United States, Russia, Italy and Germany, and pointed that Urquiza deposed Rosas to organize the country but the actual result was the secession of Buenos Aires. Domingo Faustino Sarmiento changed his view of Rosas during his late life as well. Bartolomé Mitre maintained his hatred towards him all his life, which may be explained by family reasons: Mitre's father was appointed as treasurer of Uruguay by Fructuoso Rivera and fired by Manuel Oribe; and Rosas supported Oribe against Rivera during the Uruguayan Civil War.

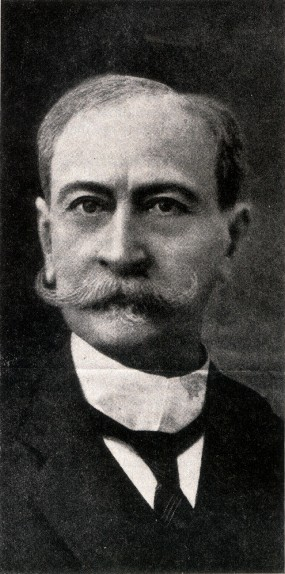
Adolfo Saldías

Bartolomé Mitre started the first noteworthy historiographic studies shortly afterwards, but opted to avoid the period of Rosas rule altogether. He wrote biographies for Manuel Belgrano and José de San Martín, which actually detailed the Spanish rule in the Americas, the Argentine War of Independence and the War with Brazil, but made no mention afterwards. His biography of San Martín ended at the point when San Martín ended his military career, and he declined to write his projected book "The ostracism and apotheosis of General San Martín", as he would have to write about San Martín's disputes with Bernardino Rivadavia, his repudiation of the execution of Manuel Dorrego and the rule of Juan Lavalle, his steady appreciative correspondence to Rosas and his rejection to the European interventions against him; all of which would hint that San Martín was closer to the Federalists than to the Unitarians. Similarly, Mitre wrote a series of small biographies of men from the War of Independence; some of them worked with Rosas later but those details were carefully omitted. Mitre established a version of history with an explicit bias against his enemies of the civil war; this method constrated sharply with the historiography of the United States, which avoided the arbitrary divisions into heroes and villains and preferred a fair and dispassionate perspective. The liberal historiography promoted by Mitre and Sarmiento was highly influenced by Anglophilia.

The first major attempt to study Rosas and the Confederation as a historical period was done by Adolfo Saldías. Being one generation after the contemporaries of Rosas, he attempted to make a scientific and dispassionated account of his rule. His work was based on a high number of sources, from varied origins. He visited Rosas' daughter Manuela Rosas in Southampton to check the archive of state documents that Rosas took with himself to the exile: mails sent and received, draft copies of official announcements and diplomatic reports, confidential reports of his ministers in London, París, Washington and Río de Janeiro, and confidential police reports. Saldías checked as well the documents published at the newspapers of the time, interviews with contemporaries and memoirs of military leaders. Saldías rejected the civilization and barbarism dichotomy introduced by Sarmiento, and described the ranchers of the countryside as a mere political faction with specific interests. He gave new significance to the Federal Pact, a perspective that would be shared by both future revisionists and authors as Emilio Ravignani and Ricardo Levene.

== The Generation of '80 ==
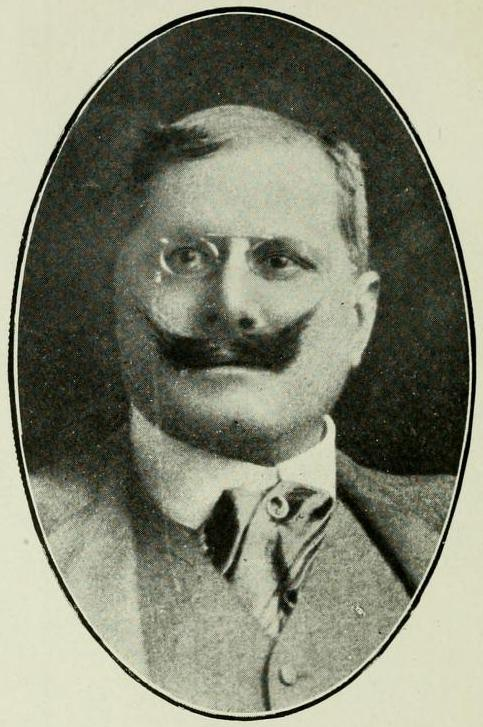
Ernesto Quesada

The years between 1880 and 1930 saw a rise of positivist essayists. They modified the approach in the study of history, but with little changes to general interpretations; for instance, the Great Man theory was gradually dismissed, favoring instead perspectives that explained history through social, mental, cultural or economic factors. José María Ramos Mejía tried to explain key biographies, specially Rosas', through a phrenologist analysis. Vicente Fidel López and Domingo Faustino Sarmiento praised his original approach, but López pointed out the lack of clinical records from the period being studied, and Sarmiento that Mejía trusted too much on libelles from that time (even by Sarmiento himself) which were more concerned with the political conflicts than with historical accuracy.

Another author from this period was Ernesto Quesada, who worked with Rosas and wrote "La época de Rosas" (Spanish: The age of Rosas) and the influential "Rosas y su tiempo" (Spanish: Rosas and his time). Quesada applied the standards of the current German scholarship, as he had studied in that country. He considered that the events of the civil war were best explained by characteristics of Argentine society rather than by Rosas' own personality, and compared the rise of Rosas after the anarchy of the year XX with the rule of the king Louis XI of France. He did not consider Rosas a tyrant, at least not in comparison with the Unitarian rules, and attributed the failure of the early attempts of political organization to the lack of political education. His book was well documented, and detailed how the image of Rosas was distorted after his exile, and many key documents concealed or destroyed. However, he was critical of Saldías' work, and had disputes with him.

A common assumption of the time considered that Argentina began an age of prosperity after the defeats of Rosas and Urquiza at Caseros and Pavón. This perspective was weakened after the 1912 Grito de Alcorta and the raise of Hipólito Yrigoyen to the presidency. Juan Álvarez, influenced by the new state of affairs, wrote a history of Argentina from an economic perspective, and redeemed the protectionist policy of Rosas as an attempt to restore the economy of the country that had been badly damaged by wars and free trade.

== The new historical school ==
The new historical school was a new generation of historians, influenced by the University Revolution, who sought to modernize the historiographical work with new methodologies. The New Historical School did not share common ideas about historical topics in themselves, but rather a common modus operandi. They were not part of the social upper classes that ruled Argentina since 1852, but sons of immigrants who arrived to Argentina during the great immigrations waves at the turn of the century. As a result, they were less influenced by factionalism and preconceived ideas.

One of the authors of the New Historical School that worked with Rosas was Emilio Ravignani, his main interest being the origins of federalism and the national organization. He presided the "Institute of historical investigations", and joined the Junta of History and Numismatics by recommendation of Ricardo Levene. As subsecretary of international relations during the administration of Hipólito Yrigoyen he could check a lot of documents and bibliography, which allowed him to write a book about the first meeting of Rosas and the British diplomat Henry Southern. In his study of the Argentine Constitution of 1853, he considered that the Federal Pact was a strong precedent which established Federal rule, later confirmed in 1853. Unlike the authors that dismissed the period as anarchic, Ravignani considered that the pacts and the role of the caudillos was instrumental to maintain national unity. Ravignani gave new significance to the caudillos, Rosas and Artigas, his work was influenced by Saldías and Quesada. His work was discussed by Ricardo Levene, who thought that the civil war and the delegation of the sum of public power generated a dictatorship, and that Rosas was a special caudillo, unlike the others.

A notable historian of the 1920s was Dardo Corvalán. All his works reinvidicated the actions of Rosas. He employed a less scholarly language than Saldías or Quesada, favoring instead a language closer to the average reader, although Saldías was almost exclusively the source of his work. He did not focus his criticism on other historians, but on writers of poetry or pamphlets against Rosas, such as Rivera Indarte. Though he was an Yrigoyenist, he did not portray Rosas as a popular or populist leader – pointing instead to his support among the wealthy people.

Another important historian was Carlos Ibarguren, minister of Roque Sáenz Peña and teacher of History of Argentina at the Faculty of Philosophy and Literature. He organized a number of conferences about Rosas, which were compiled and published in an influential book. High interest in Rosas existed for political reasons: politicians opposing Hipólito Yrigoyen (the president at the time) compared him with Rosas under a negative light, and his supporters took pride of the comparison by pointing similarities between Rosas and Yrigoyen. Ibarguren is neither critical nor supportive of Rosas, trying to provide explanations for his actions based on psychology.

== Historical revisionism ==
The 1930s saw the work of the first revisionist historians in Argentina. The historiography of Argentina is usually simplified as having a liberal or "official" history, that would be hegemonic, scientific and endorsed by the formal institutions, and a "counter history" closer to the writing of essays than to historical work and influenced by political movements. However, the context is much more complicated than that, and the frontiers between both types of history are rather diffuse. Authors deemed as "liberal" did not always follow scientific procedures, nor had homogeneous perspectives in all topics. It was not always hegemonic either, and several revisionists hold public offices or were supported by the current governments. Moreover, revisionist historians did not even have homogeneous points of view: Saldías is commonly considered the first revisionist, but his work praised Bernardino Rivadavia as well as Rosas, suggesting a continuity between both, whereas most revisionists would praise Rosas and reject Rivadavia. The 1930s revisionists were divided into right-wing nationalists, who rejected the black legend and praised the Catholic Church and the Hispanic heritage, and popular nationalists, who rejected the exclusion of the masses from political life and praised Rosas's popular support.

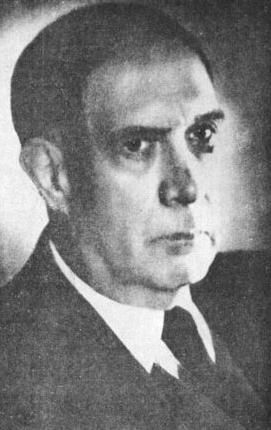
Manuel Gálvez

The starting point of the historical revisionism in the 1930s is disputed, according to the perspective held over such revisionism. Authors who consider revisionism a phenomenon related to ongoing political movements point to the 1934 book La Argentina y el imperialismo británico (Spanish: Argentina and the British imperialism), by the Irazusta brothers. This work, highly critical of the recent Roca–Runciman Treaty, considered that Britain had been imperialistic towards Argentina since its beginnings. Authors that focus instead on the historiographical merits of revisionism choose instead Ensayo sobre el año 20 (Spanish: Essay about the Year 20) and Ensayo sobre Rosas y la suma del poder (Spanish: Essay about Rosas and the sum of power), by Julio Irazusta, also from 1934. The first essay analyzed the anarchy of the year XX, and the second the historiography of Rosas. Irazusta diverged with previous works supporting Rosas: unlike Saldías, he did not consider Rosas and Rivadavia as part of a same political project but part of divergent ones. Quesada did not think Rosas to be a skilled politician, while Irazusta did think so. Neither Saldías nor Quesada considered the battle of Caseros a turning point in the history of Argentina, while Irazusta considered it a lost chance to become a global power.

There were many works about Rosas written at the end of the 1930 decade and beginning of the 1940s: Vida de Juan Manuel de Rosas (Spanish: Life of Juan Manuel de Rosas) by Manuel Gálvez in 1940, the first volume of Vida política de Juan Manuel de Rosas a través de su correspondencia (Spanish: Political life of Juan Manuel de Rosas though his correspondence) by Julio Irazusta in 1941, and Defensa y pérdida de nuestra independencia económica (Spanish: Defense and loss of our economic independence) by José María Rosa in 1942. The studies about Rosas were channeled through a new institute, the Juan Manuel de Rosas national institute of historical investigations, established in 1938. This institute and similar ones thought that public instruction was instrumental in generating a new nationalist sentiment in the population, but using new historical structures in place of the ones used in previous decades. Along with the institute, there was Pro-Repatriation Rosas Committee, which promoted the repatriation of Juan Manuel de Rosas's body.

Popular interest in Rosas further increased with the start of the Spanish Civil War and World War II, which increased and radicalized the disputes between supporters of fascism and anti-fascism to its highest level in Latin America. Most historians tried to avoid the modern political controversies and stay focused on the time period under study; Emilio Ravignani warned in 1939 that the figure of Rosas should not be used to justify modern dictatorships. Still, those disputes influenced the way people perceived history. Academics as Diego Luis Molinari and José María Rosa were attacked by student unions that considered them Nazis because of their support to Rosas, and tried to prevent them from teaching at universities. Many authors, on the other hand, opted instead to avoid Rosas altogether.

The Rosas National Institute quickly abandoned its historiographical purposes, and focused instead in merely promoting Rosas' image. It was considered that historical revisionism had already prevailed and that Rosas should be considered a national hero. Thus, the institute made little work in creating archives of the time period (although that was one of its initial purposes) and actual historical investigation, and worked instead with conferences, parades and literary comment. Although they were accused of holding fascist ideas, they did not support Francisco Franco or other modern fascist governments, supporting instead Argentine neutrality in World War II.

Palacio thought that historiography should be a reflection of the values of the society that generates it, so the historiography of decades ago was correct for its own time period but outdated in the 1930s. Manuel Gálvez compared the actions of Rosas with those of other world leaders under similar circumstances, such as Louis XI of France, Diego Portales, and considered him a leader of Republicanism in Argentina, unlike the monarchist Unitarians. Irazusta considered instead that Rosas was a great historical figure, not only in Argentina or even in South America, but in world history as well. José María Rosa rejected the Great Man theory, and thought that history should not focus on specific isolated men or events but on the evolution of society as a whole.

== Peronism ==
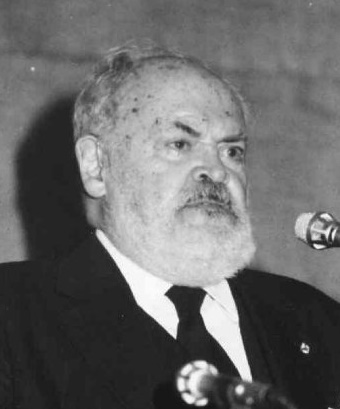
José María Rosa

The Revolution of '43 benefited revisionist historians. National universities were intervened and revisionism got a prominent role in them. However, the radical role of Jordán Bruno Genta at the National University of the Littoral was highly criticized, both by antifascists and by other revisionists as Arturo Jauretche and the Irazusta brothers. Jauretche was imprisoned for his criticism, and the magazine run by the Irazusta was closed. Others as Vicente Sierra tried a more integrationist approach.

The historical revisionism lost the high hierarchical roles achieved in the Revolution of '43 when Juan Perón was elected president. Revisionists had divided opinions towards him: Manuél Gálvez, Vicente Sierra, Ramón Doll and Ernesto Palacio gave their full support to Peronism; Juan Pablo Oliver and Federico Ibarguren supported him from other political parties; José María Rosa and Raúl Scalabrini Ortiz supported him at a mere personal level, without getting involved in politics, but Genta and the Irazusta brothers became antiperonists. The government of Perón avoided taking sides in the ideological disputes of the times, and did the same in historical topics, without endorsing nor rejecting revisionism. Other than replacing the title "The Rosas dictatorship" for "Rosas and his era" in high school textbooks, Peronism did not endorse revisionism or Rosas in any way. The state only made official praise to universally accepted national heroes, such as José de San Martín, whose centennial was celebrated in 1950. After the railway nationalization no railway received the name of Rosas; being named instead Urquiza, Mitre and Sarmiento (all of them historical enemies of Rosas) and Belgrano and San Martín (universally accepted national heroes of Argentina). On the other hand, antiperonism condemned revisionism and Rosas, extrapolating in him the criticism towards Perón. Most notably, they celebrated the centennial of the battle of Caseros in which Rosas was ousted from power. Still, the antiperonist coup that deposed Perón saw no need to modify the history curriculum, which continued to be used in schools with no modifications.

The analogies between Perón and Rosas became explicit during the Revolución Libertadora, a coup that ousted Perón from power and banned Peronism. Eduardo Lonardi, de facto president, used the quote "ni vencedores ni vencidos" (Spanish: "neither victors nor vanquished"), which was used by Urquiza after deposing Rosas in Caseros. The official perspective was that Perón was "the second tyranny", the first one being Rosas, and that both ones should be equally rejected, and conversely both governments that ousted them should be praised. This perspective was condensed into the line of historical continuity "May - Caseros - Libertadora". According to it, the purpose of the May Revolution was to build government institutions, and that purpose would only be achieved after Rosas' defeat.

This approach backfired. So far revisionism had success in academic contexts, but failed to change the popular perception of history. Perón was highly popular and the military coup unpopular; this made revisionism popular by embracing the comparison established between Rosas and Perón, but viewing him with a positive light instead. The strategy, however, was not immediate. José María Rosa was one of the most benefited revisionist historians in this context.

== Modern times ==
The Repatriation of Juan Manuel de Rosas's body, a project begun in the 1930s, finally took place in 1989, at the beginning of the first presidency of Carlos Menem. His body, until that time kept at the Southampton Old Cemetery in the United Kingdom, was moved to La Recoleta cemetery. The procession, attended by both descendants of Rosas and descendants of his historical enemies, was a symbol of the national unification promoted by Menem, who called for an end to historical enmities.

According to the historian Félix Luna, the disputes between supporters and detractors of Rosas are outdated, and modern historiography has incorporated the several corrections made by historical revisionism. Luna points that Rosas is no longer seen as a horrible monster, but as a common historical man as the others; and that it is anachronistic to judge him under modern moral standards. Luis Alberto Romero, leader historian of the CONICET, the University San Martín and the UBA, pointed that the ideas of revisionism have been smoothly included into high-school textbooks, with no visible contradictions with other perspectives. Horacio González, head of the National Library of the Argentine Republic, points a paradigm shift in the historiography of Argentina, where revisionism has moved from being the second most important perspective into being the mainstream one. However, divulgative historians often repeat outdated misconceptions about Rosas. This is usually the case of historians from outside of Argentina, who have no bias towards the Argentine topics but unwittingly repeat cliches that have long been refuted by Argentine historiography.

== Bibliography ==
- Bethell, Leslie (1996). Ideas and Ideologies in Twentieth-Century Latin America. Cambridge: Cambridge University Press. ISBN 0-521-46341-6.
- García, Irene Pilar (2011). Juan Bautista Alberdi: su bicentenario. San Miguel de Tucumán: Junta de estudios históricos de Tucumán. ISBN 978-987-25142-2-8.
- Gelman, Jorge; Raúl Fradkin (2010). Doscientos años pensando la Revolución de Mayo (in Spanish). Buenos Aires: Sudamericana. ISBN 978-950-07-3179-9.
- Devoto, Fernando; Nora Pagano (2009). Historia de la Historiografía Argentina (in Spanish). Buenos Aires: Sudamericana. ISBN 978-950-07-3076-1.
- Johnson, Lyman (2004). Death, dismemberment, and memory: body politics in Latin America. Albuquerque: University of New Mexico Press. ISBN 0-8263-3200-5.
- Knight, Alan; Rock, David; et al. (2008). Informal Empire in Latin America: Culture, Commerce, and Capital / edited by Matthew Brown. Oxford: Blackwell Publishing. ISBN 978-1-4051-7932-4.
- Lascano, Marcelo (2005). Imposturas históricas e identidad nacional (in Spanish). Buenos Aires: El Ateneo. ISBN 950-02-5900-1.
- Miller, Nicola (1999). In the shadow of the state: Intellectuals the quest for national identity in the twentieth-century Spanish-America. London: Verso. ISBN 1-85-984-738-2.
- Otero, José Pacífico (1978). Historia del libertador don José de San Martín. Buenos Aires: Biblioteca del Oficial (Círculo Militar).
- Rein, Mónica Esti (1998). Politics and Education in Argentina: 1946-1962. Armonk (N. Y.): M.E.Sharpe inc. ISBN 0-7656-0209-1.
- Shumway, Nicolas (1991). The Invention of Argentina. Berkeley: University of California Press. ISBN 0-520-08284-2.
- Spinelli, Spinelli, María Estela (2005). Los vencedores vencidos: el peronismo y la "Revolución libertadora". Argentina: Editorial Biblos. ISBN 950-786-494-6.
- Félix Luna; Arturo Jauretche; Benjamín Villegas Basavilbaso; Jaime Gálvez; León Rebollo Paz; Fermín Chávez; José Antonio Ginzo; Luis Soler Cañas; Arturo Capdevilla; Julio Irazusta; Enrique de Gandia; Ernesto Palacio; Bernardo González Arrili; Emilio Ravignani; José Antonio Saldías; Arturo Orgaz; Manuel Gálvez; Diego Luis Molinari; Ricardo Font Ezcurra; Héctor Pedro Blomberg; Ramón Doll; Adolfo Mitre; Rafael Padilla Rorbón; Alberto Gerchunoff; Mariano Bosch; Ramón de Castro Ortega; Carlos Steffens Soler; Julio Donato Álvarez; Roberto de Laferrere; Justiniano de la Fuente; Federico Barbará; Ricardo Caballero (2010). Con Rosas o contra Rosas (in Spanish). Santa Fe: H. Garetto Editor. ISBN 978-987-1493-15-9.
