= Historiography of the Paraguayan War =

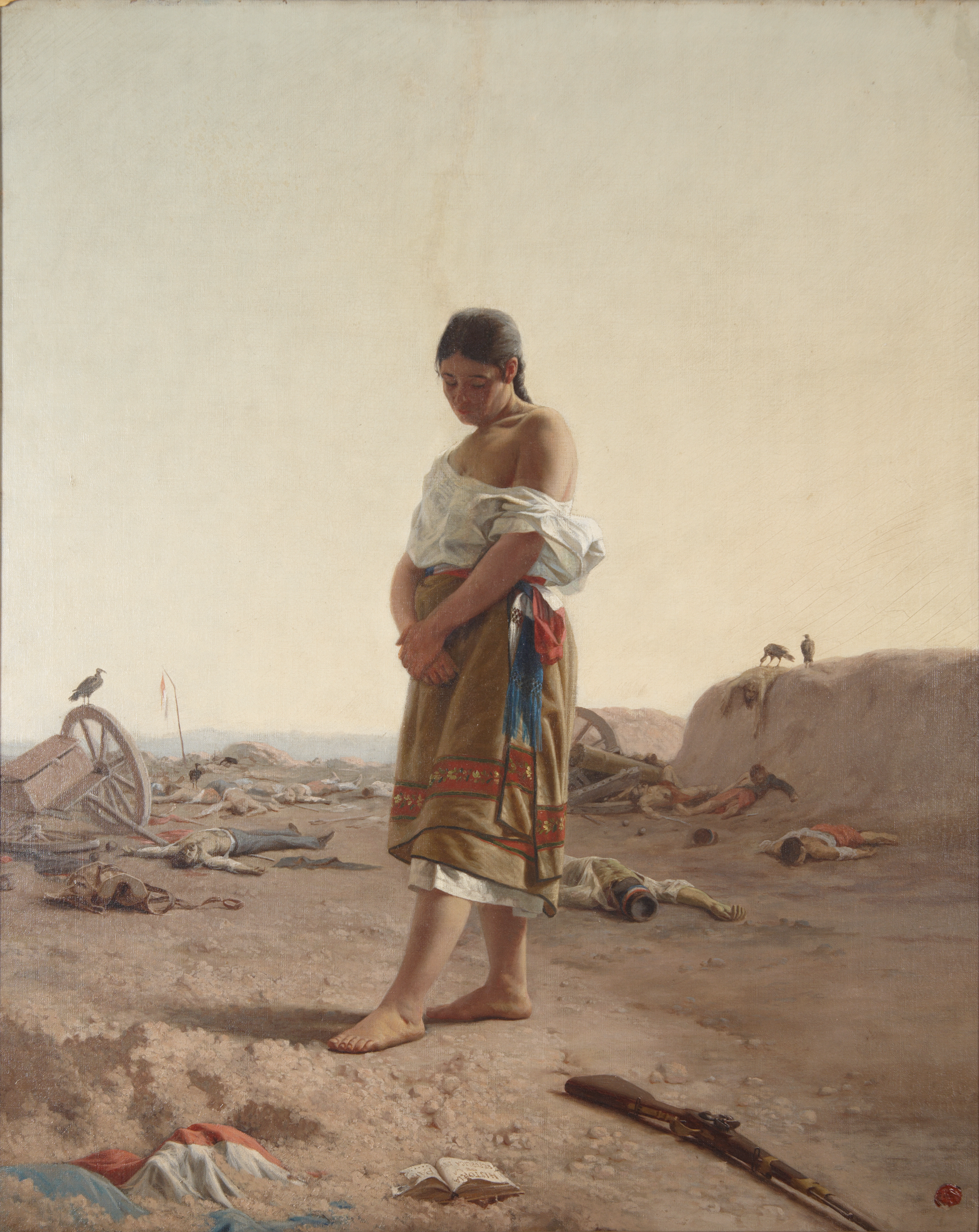
La Paraguaya, by Juan Manuel Blanes

The historiography of the Paraguayan War has undergone profound changes since the outbreak of the conflict. During and after the war, the historiography of the countries involved, for many, was limited to explaining its causes as due only to the expansionist and excessive ambition of Paraguayan president Francisco Solano López. However, since the beginning of the war there was a strong movement pointing out the conflict as the responsibility of the Empire of Brazil and of Argentina led by president Bartolomé Mitre. In this reading, Argentine and Uruguayan federalist intellectuals, such as Juan Bautista Alberdi, are brazen. In Uruguay, the criticism of Luis Alberto de Herrera stood out.

In Paraguay, the response to liberal historiography, which resumed the alliance's theses about the Paraguayan War, was also precocious and very strong. This literature was inserted in a broader revisionist context about the country's history, with emphasis on the appreciation of the action of José Gaspar Rodríguez de Francia as the founder of independent Paraguay. Among the main revisionist historians are Cecilio Báez (1862–1941); Manuel Domínguez (1868–1935); Blas Garay (1873–1899) and, finally, Juan E. Leary (1879–1969), considered as the initiator of the "positive lopizta" historiography, that is, that positively explained the war from the action of Francisco Solano López. This literature was and continues to be largely ignored in Brazil. It never embraced the thesis that Britain was responsible for the conflict.

In the 1950s, in Argentina, important literature appeared with a Marxist, populist and revisionist influence on the Paraguayan War, with emphasis on authors such as José María Rosa; Enrique Rivera and Milcíades Peña; Adolfo Saldías, Raúl Scalabrini Ortiz, also little studied and rarely mentioned in Brazil. In the 1960s, a second historiographic current, more committed to the contemporary ideological struggle of this decade between capitalism and communism, and right and left, presented an interpretation that the conflict was motivated by the interests of the British Empire, which sought to prevent the rise of a militarily and economically powerful Latin American nation.

From the 1980s, new studies proposed different reasons, revealing that the causes were due to the nation building processes of the countries involved. Many of these authors radically denied the thesis of Britain's guilt in the conflict, blaming the Empire of Brazil and Argentina, as in the case of Milcíades Peña and Enrique Rivera, in their classic work. Milcíades Peña was explicit: "Neither the Brazilian monarchy nor the Mitrist oligarchy waged the war in Paraguay on behalf of England". Paradoxically, this historiography also remains unknown in Brazil. Currently, there is an effort to read the conflict that overcomes the mythologies of positive and negative lopizmo.

== Traditional historiography (1864–1870) ==
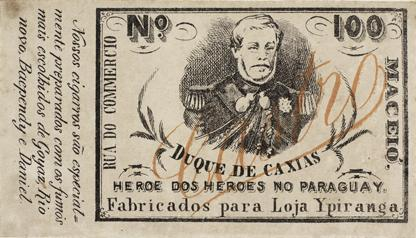
Luís Alves de Lima e Silva, the Duke of Caxias, on a cigarette label honoring his participation in the war, referring to him as "hero of heroes in Paraguay"

The traditional historiography, also called "official", emerged immediately after the conflict and lasted until the end of the 1960s. It was a simplistic and exaggerated view of the causes of the Paraguayan War, claiming that it took place thanks to the infinite ambitions of a supposedly megalomaniac and bloodthirsty Solano López who had the intention to create the "Greater Paraguay" through the conquest of territories of the neighboring countries. The Allies' reaction would then have occurred in a desperate attempt to make the "civilization" of constitutional and democratic countries prevail against the "tyrannical barbarism" of Paraguay ruled by López.

The war's long duration was justified by emperor Pedro II's obstinacy in seeing López defeated for despising him by considering him another Latin American caudillo and consequently, it would be necessary to wash the honor of Brazil. It has also been claimed that the emperor's irritation occurred after a proposal by López to marry princess Isabel, but this never occurred and is a later invention by an American author. Later, the official cult of war heroes such as the Duke of Caxias, the Marquis of Tamandaré, the Marquis of Erval and Mitre emerged. While in Paraguay, from the end of the war to the mid-1930s, López was also seen as a megalomaniac leader who destroyed the country in an unnecessary and futile war.

This was the opinion, for example, of Gustavo Barroso:

The documents clearly prove that the Paraguayan War did not arise from any of the causes that have been attributed to it until now, nor from the danger of Paraguay being absorbed by Brazil, nor from the Paraguayan interest in defending Uruguay invaded by the Empire, nor from its obligation to in maintaining the balance in the Platine basin, nor even the lying and ridiculous fable of a marriage planned by the despot with a daughter of Pedro II. It came straight from Solano López's secret thinking. He premeditated it, as is proven, which absolves the Brazilian Empire of any guilt. Either he wanted to give wings to his morbid vanity and enormous ambition with war, or he intended, at the expense of his neighbors, to extend the territorial domain of his homeland, taking it to the ocean. In this case, his thinking corresponded to the hidden desire of his nation. If that was not the case, not even that justification remains in the memory of El Supremo, as the author of the horrible tragedy.

== Revisionist historiography (1968–1990) ==
The so-called revisionist historiography emerged in the late 1960s and gained strength during the 1970s–80s, mainly pushed by Argentine historians. Its remote origins date back to the end of Brazil's imperial period, when dissatisfied republicans and soldiers influenced by Positivism (such as Benjamin Constant) carried out attacks and criticisms regarding Brazil's participation in the conflict. Behind these accusations there was an ideology in common among Brazilian republicans, as well as Argentines and Uruguayans, who aimed to discredit the imperial regime by considering it the only culprit for triggering the Paraguayan War and the supposed atrocities committed. While from the 1920s onwards, a new vision of the war emerged in Paraguay thanks to the efforts of dictators who sought legitimacy for their authoritarian governments by presenting an earlier model represented by Francia, Carlos López and his son Solano López.

The historical revisionism of the Paraguayan War received a boost in 1968 with the publication of the work La Guerra del Paraguay – Gran Negocio! (The Paraguayan War – Big business!) by Argentine writer León Pomer where he claimed that the war took place thanks to Britain's sole interest (Pomer later acknowledged that it was not Britain that "triggered" the war). In the work, like in many others published in the period, Paraguay is presented as a socialist and egalitarian country, in addition to being extremely modern, rich and powerful. Its ruler, Solano López, is presented as a visionary, anti-imperialist and socialist leader who sought to make his country free from foreign imperialist influences. Great Britain, supposedly afraid of this autonomous model and fearing that it could serve as an example for neighboring countries, tried to order Brazil, Argentina and Uruguay, mere "puppets", to destroy Paraguay, consequently exterminating practically the entire Paraguayan population.

Defending the revisionist version, historian Júlio José Chiavenato argued:

In its process of domination, never before has British imperialism been so subtle in form and so forceful in content, as in the conduction of this war. With it, England inaugurates a new type of domination: it stops direct armed interventions with its troops and finances corrupt governments to achieve its ends. The war basically started in 1850 when Paraguay began to develop a strong autonomous economy. The then president Carlos Antonio López, unable to foresee the evolution of international relations, governs the country as if the strengthening of its economy were enough for him. And he falls into the trap that destroys Paraguay: the stronger and more organized internally, the weaker externally a developing country that faces a great power becomes. In 1864, under the government of Francisco Solano López, Paraguay ended up facing a process that provoked an equal confrontation of unequal forces: an emerging and free state against an overdeveloped world power, using its economic satellites as an armed wing.

In a similar vein, historian Eric Hobsbawm argued that:

The Paraguayan War can be seen as part of the integration of the La Plata basin into England's world economy: Argentina, Uruguay and Brazil, with their faces and economies facing the Atlantic, forced Paraguay to lose its self-sufficiency, achieved in the only area in Latin America where Indians resisted white settlement effectively, thanks perhaps to the original Jesuit domination.

Such a view, now considered simplistic and without empirical basis, became widespread from the 1960s onwards by different schools of historians, of the most diverse nationalities and strands.

Among those linked to the Marxist left, there was an interest in transforming Solano López's Paraguay into a kind of precursor of the communist regime in Cuba. According to the revisionism adopted by these historians, Solano López intended to implement an autonomous nationalist regime in Paraguay, opposed to the great empire of his time, in this case Great Britain, in a similar way to the opposition made by Cuba to the USA after the rise of Fidel Castro. There was also the intention, on the part of these historians, to harm the image of the war heroes worshiped by the dictatorial military regimes of the time that persecuted them.

The Great Soviet Encyclopedia, considered the official encyclopedic source of the USSR, presented a short view about the Paraguayan War, favorable to the Paraguayan government, claiming that the conflict was a "war of imperialist aggression" long planned by slave-owners and the bourgeois capitalists, waged by Brazil, Argentina and Uruguay under instigation of Great Britain, France and the United States. The same encyclopedia presents Francisco Solano López as a statesman who became a great military leader and organizer, dying heroically in battle. The Great Russian Encyclopedia, created by official mandate of President Vladimir Putin, continues with the "Russian Tradition" of presenting the Paraguayan War as a military conflict provoked by the "Triple Alliance" with the financial and military support of the British Empire, in a version that remains sympathetic towards Paraguay.

However, Marxists were not the only ones to embrace such an interpretation. The reinforcement of Solano López's supposed heroism also served those linked to the nationalist right. Among the latter, Paraguayan dictator Alfredo Stroessner himself stands out, who even sponsored the filming of the epic movie Cerro Corá, with the aim of reinforcing the image of Francisco Solano López as a Paraguayan martyr.

This revisionist view, which is still taught in most schools in Latin American countries, lacks any kind of hard evidence, data or empirical evidence.

However, the effects of the revisionist historiographical view of the conflict were seen in several generations of Latin Americans (mainly Argentines, Brazilians and Uruguayans) who came to observe their past in a pessimistic way and to despise the historical figures of their countries. Such effects were felt mainly in Paraguay, where, as previously mentioned, the revisionist version was assumed as an official State doctrine, even more so after Solano López's transformation into a flawless hero. Brazilian historian Francisco Doratioto argued that:

Blaming Britain for the conflict satisfies, in the 1960s and 1980s, different political interests. For some, it was about showing the possibility of building a model of non-dependent economic development in Latin America, pointing to the Paraguayan State of the López family as a precedent. They ended up denying this possibility, insofar as they presented the central power – Great Britain – as omnipotent, capable of imposing and disposing of peripheral countries, to destroy any attempt at non-dependence. As a result, the unsuspecting reader, or the students who learned from this booklet, may have concluded that the history of our continent cannot or cannot be done here, as the central countries decide everything irrevocably. Latin Americans, in this perspective, cease to be the subject of their own history, or, in another way, they see their potential to be such subjects denied.

In his preface to the second edition of The Paraguayan War: Causes and Early Conduct, Thomas L. Whigham wrote:

Revisionists of the extreme right and left (who have far more in common with each other than the empiricists they tend to condemn) continue to churn out studies and polemics that repeat the "populist" interpretations of the war’s causes and conduct. The only real difference with the earlier works is that the newcomers find it harder to distinguish between assertions and facts and display little interest in documentary evidence.

== Modern historiography (1990–) ==
Territorial disputes in the Platine basin, 1864

Already in 1930 the British historian Pelham Horton Box in his The Origins of the Paraguayan War had rejected the "mad dictator" theory of the war's origins. The first book, certainly in the English language, to seek to ascertain the war's causes by a thorough investigation of the available documents, Box wrote that "What emerges most clearly is the fact that the war germinated in the political and economic instability of the states of the Río de la Plata at this period in the history of South America. The uncertain and shifting factors were Argentina, Uruguay and, to a less extent, Brazil". The complex set of circumstances he described went back deep into the colonial era. Although Box was an admirer of Leon Trotsky his book is not written from a Marxist perspective.

In 1990, Brazilian historian Ricardo Salles published the work Guerra do Paraguai: Escravidão e Cidadania na Formação do Exército (Paraguayan War: Slavery and Citizenship in the Formation of the Army), where he presented an analysis of traditional and revisionist historiography: "If traditional studies on the war suffer from an excess of officialism and factualism, in turn, revisionist versions of the history of the conflict tend to simplifications not always based on deeper investigations". This work was one of the first of a new generation of historians who sought to analyze the Paraguayan War.

The studies carried out by these professionals revealed that the causes of the conflict were not due to external influence or the pure and simple ambition of a single man. But the result of a series of factors related to the formation as nation-states of the countries involved and the geopolitical and economic processes of the region, resulting from the historical, political and geographical inheritance of two different cultures: Portuguese and Spanish. Historian Francisco Doratioto concisely presented this new view of the causes of the conflict:

"The Paraguayan War was the result of the Platine basin contradictions, with the ultimate reason being the consolidation of nation states in the region. These contradictions crystallized around the Uruguayan Civil War, which began with the support of the Argentine government to the insurgents, in which Brazil intervened and Paraguay as well. However, this does not mean that the conflict was the only way out of the difficult regional situation. War was one of the possible options, which ended up materializing, since it was in the interest of all the States involved. Its rulers, based on partial or false information about the Platine context and the potential enemy, foresaw a quick conflict, in which their objectives would be achieved at the lowest expense possible. Here there are no "bad guys" or "good guys", as childish revisionism wants, but interests. The war was seen from different perspectives: for Solano López it was the opportunity to place his country as a regional power and gain access to the sea through the port of Montevideo, thanks to the alliance with the Uruguayan blancos and the Argentine federalists, represented by Urquiza; for Bartolomé Mitre, it was the way to consolidate the centralized Argentine state, eliminating external support to the federalists, provided by the blancos and Solano López; for the blancos, Paraguayan military support against Argentines and Brazilians would make it possible to prevent their two neighbors from continuing to intervene in Uruguay; For the Empire, the war against Paraguay was neither expected nor desired, but once it started, it was thought that the Brazilian victory would be quick and would put an end to the border dispute between the two countries and the threats to free navigation, and would allow Solano López to be deposed". "Of the errors in analysis by the statesmen involved in these events, the one that had the greatest consequences was that of Solano López, as his country was materially devastated at the end of the war. And, remember, he was the aggressor, initiating the war against Brazil and, later, with Argentina".

The most detailed analysis, at least in the English language, is Thomas L. Whigham's The Paraguayan War: Causes and Early Conduct (2nd ed., 2018), available as open access. Professor Whigham was not only interested in why the war started, but why it continued so long. This he described in his sequel book The Road to Armageddon: Paraguay versus the Triple Alliance, 1866–70, also open access.
