= Blood tables: it is a holy action to kill Rosas =

Book by José Rivera Indarte

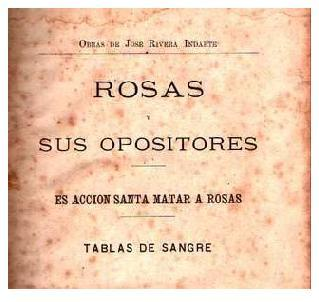
- Author: José Rivera Indarte
- Original title: Tablas de Sangre: es acción santa matar a Rosas
- Language: Spanish
- Subject: Juan Manuel de Rosas
- Genre: Libel
- Publication date: 1843
- Publication place: Argentina

Blood tables: it is a holy action to kill Rosas (Spanish: Tablas de Sangre: es acción santa matar a Rosas) is an 1843 Argentine libelle written by José Rivera Indarte against the governor of Buenos Aires, Juan Manuel de Rosas. It details 465 purported crimes committed by Rosas or the Popular Restoring Society; later editions increased the number by 22,560. The book was used as a primary source by the early historiography of Juan Manuel de Rosas; modern historians consider its figures to be inflated.

== Context ==
The book was written during the Argentine Civil Wars between federals who wanted to organize the country as a federation, and unitarians who preferred a centralist country with the capital in Buenos Aires. Unitarian Juan Lavalle made a coup against the governor Manuel Dorrego and executed him, but the federal counteroffensive led by Juan Manuel de Rosas deposed him from power, and most unitarians escaped to Montevideo, Uruguay. From that country they plotted new attacks. They allied with the Colorados, who deposed the Uruguayan president Manuel Oribe; Oribe and the Blancos allied with the Argentine federals. Rosas was appointed governor of the Buenos Aires province by the provincial legislature, and managed the international relations of the country. France imposed the French blockade of the Río de la Plata in support of the War of the Confederation, and the Unitarians allied with the French. Lavalle launched a new ill-fated invasion of Argentina, and the French gave up the blockade.

José Rivera Indarte was one of the unitarians living in Montevideo. He was once a federal and a member of the Popular Restoring Society, and wrote the "Anthem of the Restorers" and the "Federal Anthem", which were highly eulogistic of Rosas. Indarte was expelled from the university of Buenos Aires for swindling and forging documents and moved to Montevideo, joining the unitarians.

The Atlas of London detailed on March 1, 1845, that the Lafone house paid Indarte a penny for each death attributed to Rosas. The initial edition allowed Indarte to receive two pounds sterling. He published a new edition, increasing the deaths attributed to Rosas with 22,560 deaths and possible deaths that took place in battles since 1829. The Lafone house, led by Samuel Lafone, owned the wealth of the foreign trade of Montevideo up to 1848, and would benefit greatly from a naval blockade of Buenos Aires, even if short-lived. Indarte's libel generated huge controversy in Europe, leading to the Anglo-French blockade of the Río de la Plata.

== Content ==
The book includes a list of Argentine people who died in the period between 1829 and 1843, considering all of them as victims of political repression. However, the list includes several entries that can hardly fit into that description, such as soldiers who died in military actions against French forces. Several names are repeated, and others are only marked "N.N." (nomen nescio). Indarte also mentions deaths by poisoning, even though only the unitarians employed that technique.

In addition, the cases are taken from all the Argentine provinces of the time (14 provinces and one national territory), and from Uruguay. There are a total of 49 cases from the 1829–1839 period, which was before 1840, the most violent year of Rosas' administration. Fourteen cases took place in the 1832–1835 period when Rosas left the province to wage the Desert Campaign. The remaining 35 cases took place over a period of 10 years, which equals 3.5 cases each year, and 0.3 cases each month. The five-year period between 1839 and 1843 is associated with 416 cases. This equals 83.2 cases per year, which amounts to an average of five cases per year and 0.4 cases per month by political unit.

The book encouraged the women of Buenos Aires to kill Rosas, detailing how to prepare poisons for that purpose. Even Manuela Rosas, daughter of Juan Manuel, was encouraged to do so. The book claimed that Juan Manuel de Rosas had incestuous relations with his daughter, and that she once served the ears of a prisoner as a delicacy. Indarte included a chapter to justify himself against the criticisms by federal newspapers, resorting to tu quoque arguments.

The book also says that the heads of Rosas' victims were shown in the local marketplace, decorated with blue ribbons. This is a misrepresentation of a known incident: a local butcher had killed his whole family, placed their heads in a trolley and paraded them as peaches for sale; this incident was reported in newspapers of the time. Indarte turned the crime of passion into a political crime, recast the deaths as unitarian deaths, and added the local marketplace and the blue ribbons for shock value.

== Criticism ==
Writer Alberto Palcos considers that the book contains highly immoral vocabulary and attacks on Rosas, to the point that it maintains a false allegation of child sexual abuse by Rosas of his daughter. He also criticizes the fact that the book preached that murder was a "holy action". He thought that the book should have not been republished.

== Bibliography ==
- Rosa, José María (1974) [1970]. Historia Argentina [History of Argentina] (in Spanish). Vol. V. Buenos Aires: Editorial Oriente S.A.
- Smith, Carlos (1936). Juan Manuel de Rosas ante la posteridad. Buenos Aires: Bernabé y Cía.
