= Aurora Venturini =

Argentine novelist, short story writer, poet, translator and essayist

Aurora Venturini (December 20, 1922 – November 24, 2015) was an Argentine novelist, short story writer, poet, translator and essayist.

== Biography ==
Aurora Venturini was born in 1922 in La Plata, Buenos Aires, Argentina. She graduated in Philosophy and Education Sciences at the National University of La Plata. She was an adviser to the Institute of the Child's Psychology and Re-education (Instituto de Psicología y Reeducación del Menor) where she met Eva Perón who was an intimate friend and with whom she worked. In 1948, Jorge Luis Borges personally handed her the Initiation Award (Premio Iniciación) for her book El solitario. She studied Psychology at the University of Paris, city in which she self-exiled for 25 years after the Liberating Revolution. In Paris she lived in company of Violette Leduc and became a friend of Jean-Paul Sartre, Simone de Beauvoir, Albert Camus, Eugène Ionesco and Juliette Gréco; in Sicily she frequented the friendship of Salvatore Quasimodo. She was married to historian Fermín Chávez. She was Philosophy professor at the Antonio Mentruyt Normal School (Escuela Normal Antonio Mentruyt) in Banfield. She translated and wrote critical essays on poets such as Isidore Ducasse, Conde de Lautréamont, François Villon and Arthur Rimbaud; for the translations of the latter two authors she received the Iron Cross decoration granted by the French government. In 2007, she received the Página/12 New Novel Award for Las primas (The Cousins). She died on November 24, 2015, in Buenos Aires at the age of 92.

== Works ==
- Versos al recuerdo (1942)
- El anticuario (1948)
- Adiós desde la muerte (1948)
- El solitario (1951)
- Peregrino del aliento (1953)
- Lamentación mayor (1955)
- El ángel del espejo (1959)
- Laúd (1959)
- La trova (1962)
- Panorama de afuera con gorriones (1962)
- La pica de la Susona; leyenda andaluza (1963)
- François Villon, raíx de iracunida; vida y pasión del juglar de Francia (1963)
- Carta a Zoraida; relatos para las tías viejas (1964)
- Pogrom del cabecita negra (1969)
- Jovita la osa (1974)
- La Plata mon amour (1974)
- Antologia personal, 1940-1976 (1981)
- Zingarella (1988)
- Las Marías de Los Toldos (1991)
- Nosotros, los Caserta (1992)
- Estos locos bajitos por los senderos de su educación (1994)
- Poesía gauchipolítica federal (1994)
- Hadas, brujas y señoritas (1997)
- 45 poemas paleoperonistas (1997)
- Evita, mester de amor (1997), in collaboration with Fermín Chávez.
- Me moriré en París, con aguacero (1998)
- Lieder (1999)
- Alma y Sebastián (2001)
- Venid amada alma (2001)
- Racconto (2004)
- John W. Cooke (2005)
- Bruna Maura-Maura Bruna (2006)
- Las primas (2008)
