= Repatriation of Juan Manuel de Rosas's body =

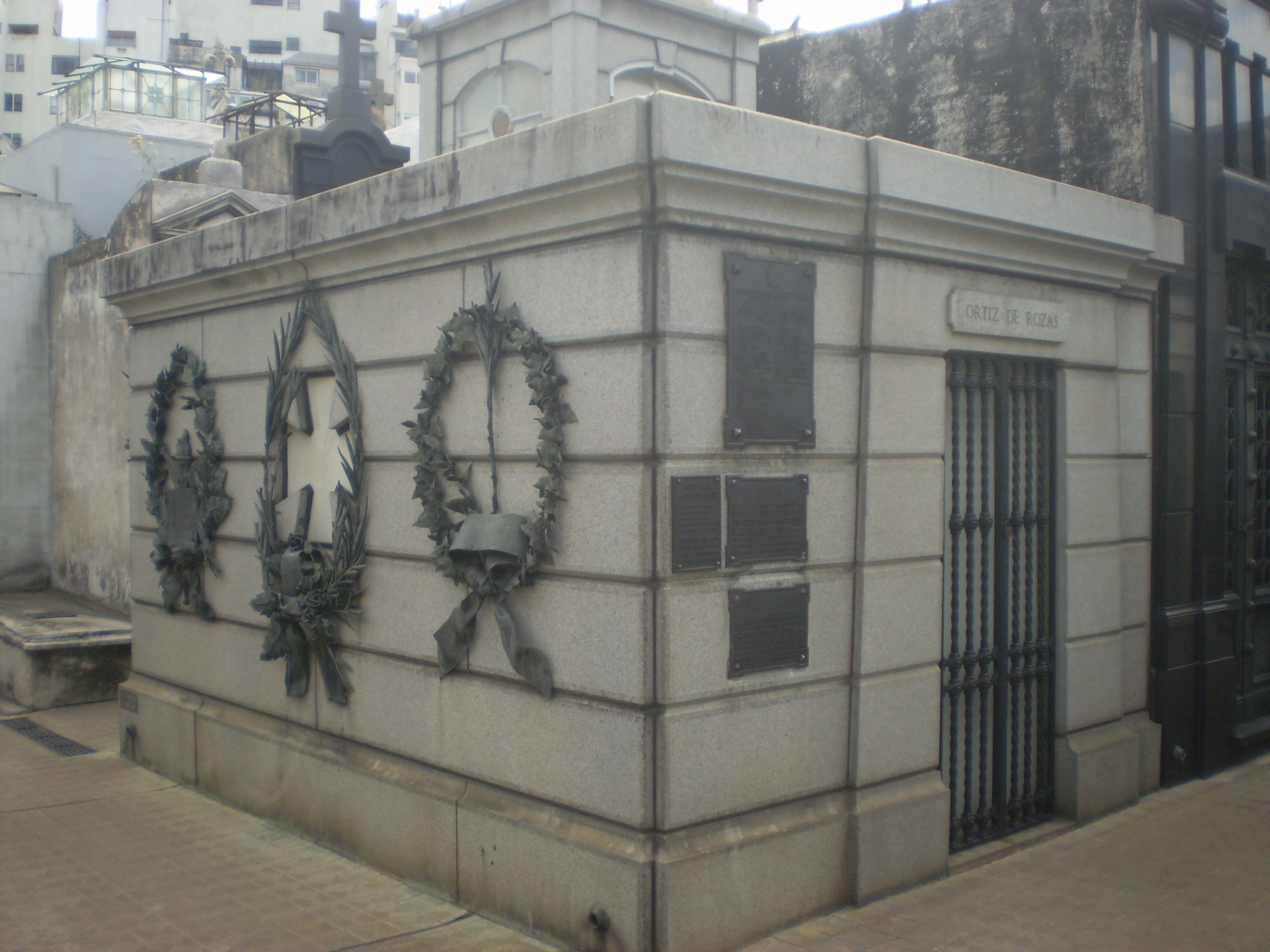
Mausoleum of Juan Manuel de Rosas at La Recoleta cemetery

Juan Manuel de Rosas was Governor of Buenos Aires Province during the Argentine Civil Wars. Deposed during the battle of Caseros, he spent his later life in exile in Southampton, England, where he died on March 14, 1877. He was buried at the Southampton Old Cemetery, and after a number of failed attempts the body was repatriated to Argentina and taken to La Recoleta Cemetery, where his remains are buried.

== Death ==
Juan Manuel de Rosas was the Governor of Buenos Aires Province from 1829 to 1832 and 1835 to 1852. He's also famous for defeating an Anglo-French invasion during the Battle of Vuelta de Obligado in 1845. At the time the country fought many civil wars between Federals and Unitarians, Rosas being a federal leader. He was ousted from power by Justo José de Urquiza, governor of the Entre Ríos Province, at the battle of Caseros. Defeated, he was rescued by a British warship and moved to Southampton, where he stayed the rest of his life. He died on March 14, 1877, and he was buried at the Southampton Old Cemetery. Fearing pro-Rosas demonstrations, the Argentine government forbid any commemoration in his honour, and made instead a mass for the people that died during Rosas's government.

With Rosas out of the country, the Unitarians returned to Buenos Aires. They sought to erase or denigrate the legacy of Rosas, confiscated their property and charged him with high treason. Bartolomé Mitre, who fought in Caseros, did so with the first histographic works of Argentina, with a high negative bias against Rosas and other caudillos. This historiographical perspective was soon confronted by the end of the 19th century by revisionist scholars like Adolfo Saldías and Ernesto Quesada, who described Rosas under a positive light.

== Repatriation projects ==
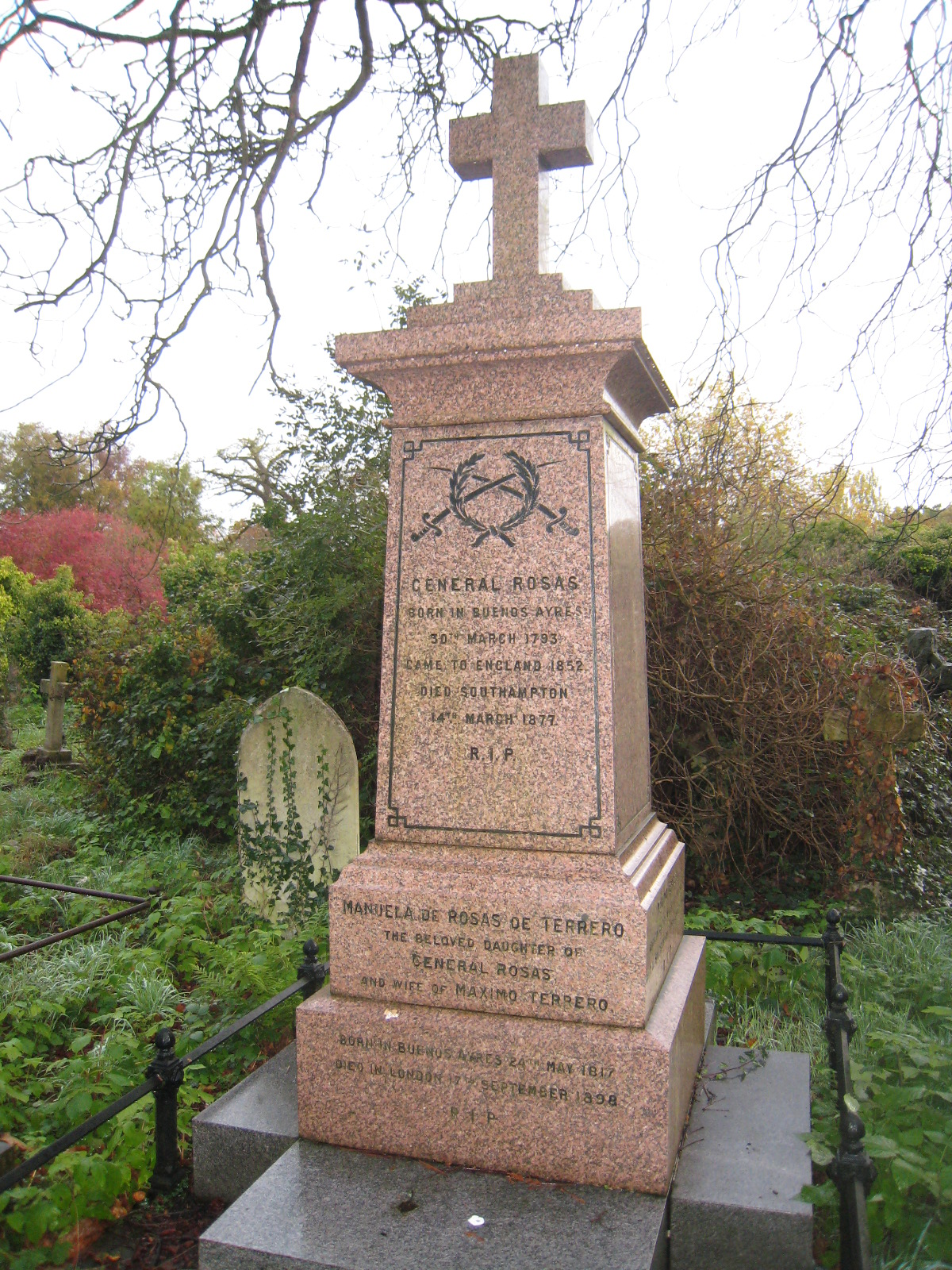
Rosas memorial in Southampton Old Cemetery.

Anticipating the controversy, Rosas wrote in his will that "once my country recognizes, along with its government, the justice owed me by my services", then his body shall be returned to Argentina. Revisionism kept growing, specially in the 1920s and 1930s. The 1930s saw the establishment of the Pro-Repatriation of Rosas Committee. Revisionist authors got state recognition during the Revolution of '43 (the United Kingdom was fighting World War II at that time) and lost it during the first presidencies of Juan Perón, as Perón tried to avoid ideological disputes. Perón was deposed in 1955 by the Revolución Libertadora military coup and sent to exile, and Peronism was proscribed. Perón became a supporter of revisionism in the 1960s, and helped Manuel de Anchorena in the renewed efforts of the Committee.

Perón returned from exile and became president in 1973. He appointed Anchorena ambassador in England, and instructed him to negotiate the repatriation of Rosas's body. Great Britain authorized it, and the Argentine Congress passed a resolution for this purpose. The repatriation was imminent, but the country began a period of turmoil: Perón died in 1974, his wife Isabel Perón could not keep the Dirty War under control (a conflict between left-wing guerrillas and right-wing anti-communist groups), and a new military coup, the National Reorganization Process, deposed Isabel Perón. It is unknown if the repatriation was paused by the military or by the committee.

The military left in 1983, and Raúl Alfonsín became the new president. He did not take action to resume the repatriation.

== Final repatriation ==
Alfonsín was followed by Peronist Carlos Menem in 1989, amid an economic crisis. Menem announced that the main task of his presidency would be the national reconciliation, the end of the dichotomies that once plagued the country. In the case of Rosas, he claimed that he wanted to be "the president of Rosas and Sarmiento", of "Mitre and Quiroga". Both pairs were historical enemies, and Menem sought to end those conflicts. With those ideas in mind, Menem gave the final boost to the repatriation project. The body would be taken from the cemetery, placed in a new coffin in France, and them moved by plane to Argentina.

There were projects to place the coffin in the Buenos Aires Cathedral, next to the one of José de San Martín, but a 1982 papal regulation forbid to bury people in cathedrals except for popes, archbishops and cardinals. The committee attempted to bypass the regulation, to no avail. As a result, it was placed in La Recoleta Cemetery instead.

The body was received in France with the honours of a head of state: red carpet, full military honours and the flag at half staff. In Argentina, the newspaper La Nación (founded by Bartolomé Mitre) declared that it was not against the repatriation. The huge procession took place on September 30, 1989, and had the presence of both descendants of Rosas and descendants of Rosas's enemies, who marched together in peace.
