= Edwin Moon =

English aviation pioneer (1886–1920)

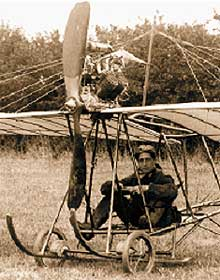
- Edwin Moon in Moonbeam II, the first plane to take off from Southampton Airport
- Born: 8 June 1886; Southampton, England
- Died: 29 April 1920 (aged 33); Felixstowe, England
- Resting place: Southampton Old Cemetery
- Occupations: Pioneer aviator and RNAS pilot
- Spouse(s): Isabel Madeline Waldron (from 1911–1920)
- Children: Daughter Mary (b. 1915)
- Parent(s): Edwin George Wade Moon; Catherine Esther Butt
- Awards: DSO and bar The Legion of Honour – Croix de Chevalier; Royal Humane Society silver medal

Squadron Leader Edwin Rowland Moon DSO* (8 June 1886 – 29 April 1920) was an English aviation pioneer who served in the Royal Naval Air Service and Royal Air Force during the First World War. He was a prisoner of war and he was twice awarded a DSO.

== Family ==
Moon was one of four children of Edwin George Wade Moon and Catherine Esther Butt, who lived in Cranbury Avenue in Southampton. He was educated at Cranleigh School in Surrey.

Moon married Isabel Madeline Waldron in 1911 and had a daughter named Mary in 1913.

== The aviation dream ==
The Moon family owned a boat-building business based at the Wool House. The Moonbeam Engineering Company Limited built motor launches and later expanded to include the sale of wrought iron propellers and marine engines for export around the world. Edwin Moon, possibly inspired by the 1903 Wright brothers flight, took a corner of the workshop to realise his dream of constructing and flying an aircraft of his own design.

He tested his first plane, Moonbeam I, in the Fawley area, near the home of his future bride. His first short "hop" took place on Websters Field at Ower Farm, near Calshot and at Moulands Field, Regents Park. Following these test flights on the prototype plane, he built a second plane, Moonbeam II.

Moonbeam II was a monoplane, weighing 260 lbs, of which 160 lbs was engine and propeller. A V-4 cylinder, 20 h.p. J.A.P engine was fitted, and it had a 6 ft wooden propeller. Moonbeam II was first tested at Beaulieu Heath (close to the Royal Oak public house at Hill Top) on 3 February 1910. The Hampshire Independent reported on Saturday 5 February:

The first Southampton-built aeroplane was tried on Beaulieu Heath on Thursday. The machine is an all-British made, and was built and designed by Mr Edwin Moon, of Southampton. It is a small monoplane, and contains several original ideas, one of which is in the steering arrangements, the machine being entirely controlled by one wheel. ... The aeroplane, which has been christened ‘Moonbeam’, was taken to Beaulieu on Tuesday night, but owing to the strong wind prevailing on Wednesday the trials were postponed till Thursday. Considering that the trials are only initial ones, they were quite as good as could be expected, though owing to the bumpy state of the ground, which was like a quagmire, the machine did not rise. The bumping broke the scag, which supports the hind part of the machine, and the tail striking the ground was broken, making further trials that day impossible. Mr. Moon hopes, however, to have another try on Monday.

Later in 1910, the plane was conveyed by horse-drawn cart to the meadows belonging to North Stoneham farm from where he made the first successful flight; the precise date of the first flight is not known, although researchers believe that it was between 12 April 1910 and 11 June 1910.

The following year, on 2 April 1911, a French pilot, Maurice Tétard, flying from Brooklands to Larkhill, called at North Stoneham to make some adjustments; although he only stayed for about half an hour, a large inquisitive crowd rapidly gathered to admire the plane. In 1917, the field at North Stoneham was requisitioned by the War Office as an Aircraft Acceptance Park, but before completion, the base was given to the US Navy to develop an assembly area; this subsequently evolved into Southampton International Airport.

Moon later regularly flew his plane from Stoneham, as well as from Paultons Park. He gained his aviator's certificate in 1914.

== Military career ==
Following the start of World War I, Moon soon enlisted in the Royal Naval Air Service with the rank of flight sub-lieutenant. His military service took him to East Africa, based on HMS Hyacinth, from where on 6 January 1917 he was on a reconnaissance flight with Cdr. Richard Bridgeman as observer. They were forced to land with engine trouble and came down in a creek of the Rufiji River delta where they destroyed the seaplane to avoid the possibility of its being captured by the enemy. They then spent three days wandering in the delta trying to avoid capture and to rejoin their ship. During this time they had little or nothing to eat, and were continually obliged to swim across the creeks, the bush on the banks being impenetrable.

On 7 January, they constructed a raft from the window frame of a house; after two days of drifting on the raft they were swept out to sea on the morning of 9 January, where Cdr. Bridgeman, who was not a strong swimmer, died of exhaustion and exposure. Moon tried to keep Bridgeman on the raft but he slipped off into the sea. After Moon had been on the raft for some thirteen hours the tide turned and the raft was thrown onto the shore. Moon was rescued by natives who handed him over to the Germans, who interred him in a prisoner of war camp. He was released from captivity on 21 November 1917.

In June 1917, Moon was awarded the Distinguished Service Order; the citation read:

Since April 1916, has carried out constant flights over the enemy's coast, including reconnaissances, bomb-dropping and spotting for gun fire in all weathers. Has shown great coolness and resource on all occasions.

Following his release from captivity, Moon received a bar to his DSO, for the display of "the greatest gallantry in attempting to save the life of his companion". Bridgeman's body was recovered from the sea and is buried in Dar es Salaam CWGC Cemetery.

As well as the DSO, Moon was awarded the Royal Humane Society's silver medal for his attempts to save Bridgeman's life and The Legion of Honour – Croix de Chevalier. He was also recommended for the Victoria Cross, but this was not awarded.

His other military awards were:

- 1914–15 Star
- British War Medal
- Victory Medal with oak palm

== Later career and death ==
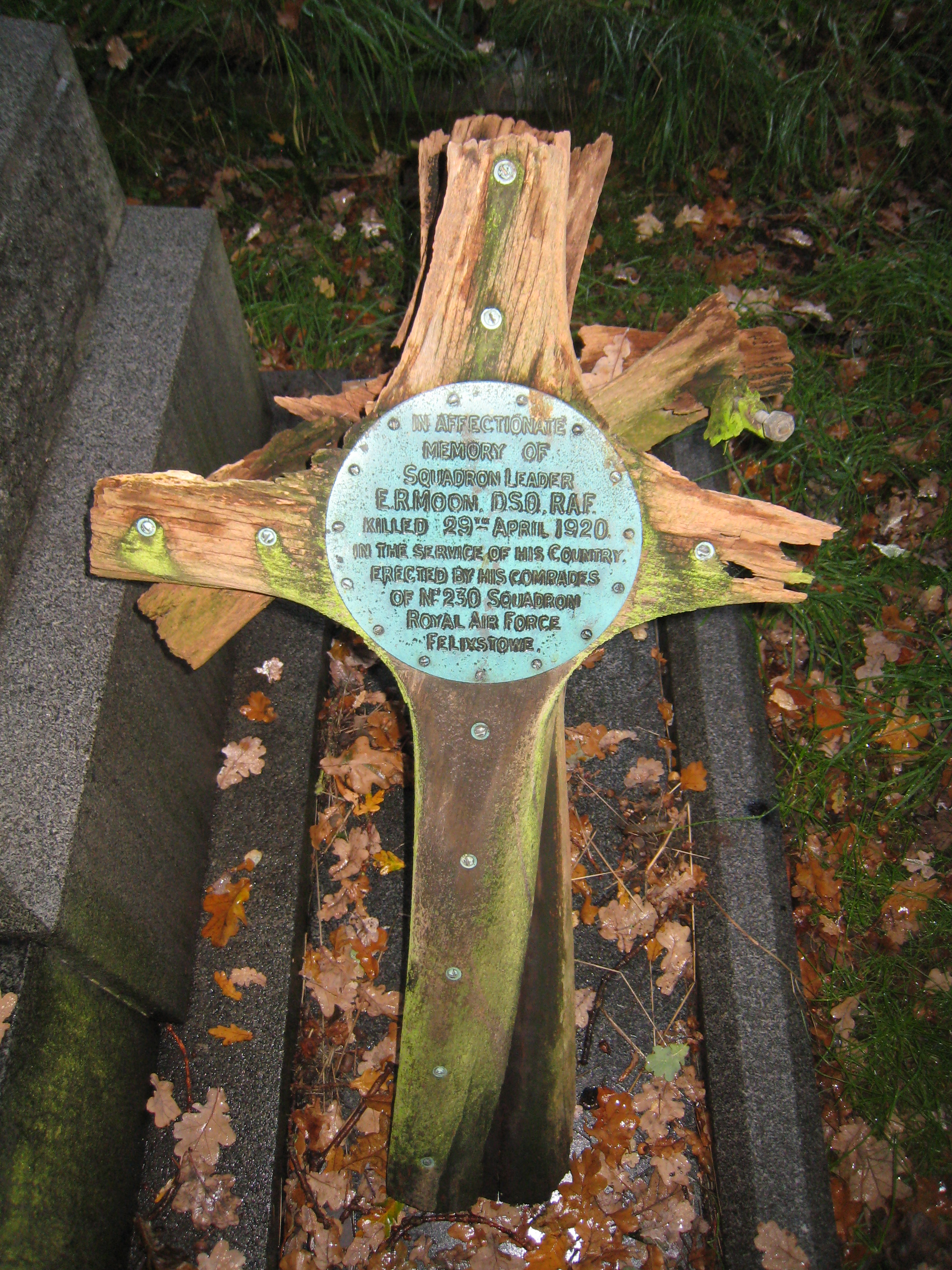
Moon's grave marker in 2010

After the war, Moon was in command of the flying boat station at Felixstowe with the rank of Squadron Leader in the newly formed RAF.

On 11 August 1919, Moon survived the crash of the Felixstowe Fury flying boat which killed one of the crew. The Fury was a large five-engined flying boat which had just left Felixstowe on a test flight to Plymouth; she was due the next day to attempt a long-distance 8,000-mile (12,875 km) flight from England to South Africa and return.

In December 1919, Moon represented Winston Churchill, Secretary of State for War at the funeral of Sir John Alcock the transatlantic pioneer.

On 29 April 1920, Moon was at the controls of a flying boat on an instructional cruise when it crashed into the sea. Moon and three other crew members were killed, while two were rescued, slightly injured. At the inquest a survivor, Observer-Officer L. H. Pakenham Walsh, D.F.C. gave evidence saying that "the flying boat started off all right, and it had made several practice landings on the water". Squadron-Leader Moon took control to do a glide. At about 1,500 ft (460 m) "the machine received a bump on the tail which threw the machine out of control and developed into a spin". Although Squadron-Leader Moon tried to regain control, they were too close to the water to complete the recovery. The aircraft collapsed upon hitting the water. Pakenham Walsh "went under, and when he came up he did not see anybody else".

The Coroner said, so far as he could make out, there was nothing wrong with the machine or the piloting. It appeared to be a pure accident. He recorded a verdict of "Death from injuries received through the sudden accidental fall of a flying boat."

Moon was buried at Southampton Old Cemetery with a wooden marker which is believed to be part of the propeller of the plane in which he died, which was erected by his comrades of 230 Squadron, Royal Air Force.
