= Adolfo Saldías =

Argentine historian, lawyer, politician, soldier and diplomat

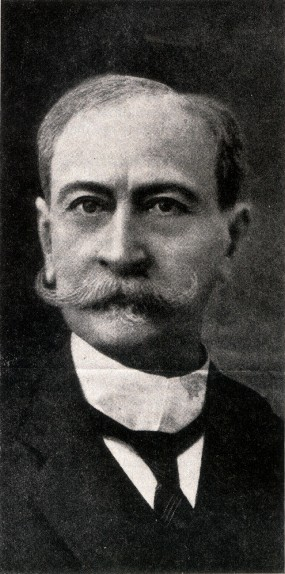
- Born: September 6, 1849
- Died: October 17, 1914 (aged 65)
- Military career
- Allegiance: Argentina
- Conflicts: Revolution of the Park

Adolfo Saldías (Buenos Aires, 6 September 1849; La Paz, Bolivia 17 October 1914) was an Argentine historian, lawyer, politician, soldier and diplomat.

Saldías received his law degree in 1875 and published a thesis on the subject of Civil matrimony. he started to participate in politics through the popular Autonomist Party of Buenos Aires, led by Adolfo Alsina and confronting Bartolomé Mitre, along with Aristóbulo del Valle, Leandro Alem and Bernardo de Irigoyen with whom he would form the future Radical Civic Union party.

He took an active part on the Revolution of the Park and was one of the first to enter the Artillery Park, along with Leandro Alem, being arrested and exiled to Uruguay. A founding member of the Radical Civic Union in 1891, he was again part of an armed insurrection in the Revolution of 1893, being arrested, incarcerated in Ushuaia and again exiled to Uruguay. In 1898, he was named Minister of Public Works and in 1902, Vicegobernor of Buenos Aires Province, following Bernardo de Irigoyen.

He was an active freemason. José María Rosa and Fermín Chávez recognize in Saldías the precursor of the revisionist school of Argentine politics. He wrote works on the life of Juan Manuel de Rosas and the Argentine Confederation, which earned him intellectual prestige and good sales income, and the favor of being considered as part of the Buenos Aires intellectual elite. In 1881 he published the first version of what in 1888 would be his master work, the Historia de la Confederación Argentina. With ingenuity, he dedicated it to Mitre and sent it to him for consideration. Mitre responded harshly, condemning the work, his conclusions and the author. The press of the day ignored the book, limiting its publication. As author, he was practically condemned to a civil death, as it was not even commented upon in the press, not even to criticize it.

In 1912, he travelled to Bolivia as official envoy and ambassador, a post he maintained until his death.

Saldías station in Buenos Aires is named after him.

== Writings ==
- Ensayo sobre la historia de la Constitución Argentina, 1878
- Historia de Rosas later retitled Historia de la Confederación Argentina, 1881/1883
- Bianchietto, 1896
- La Evolución republicana durante la Revolución Argentina, 1906
- Papeles de Rozas, two volumes (1906–1907)
- La Idea del Simbolismo Masónico
- Los Números de línea del ejercito argentino, 1888

== See also ==
- Historiography of Juan Manuel de Rosas

== Bibliography ==
- Proyecto Ameghino, Adolfo Saldías: historiador (in Spanish), Buenos Aires: Educ.ar
