= Nogoyá =

- City
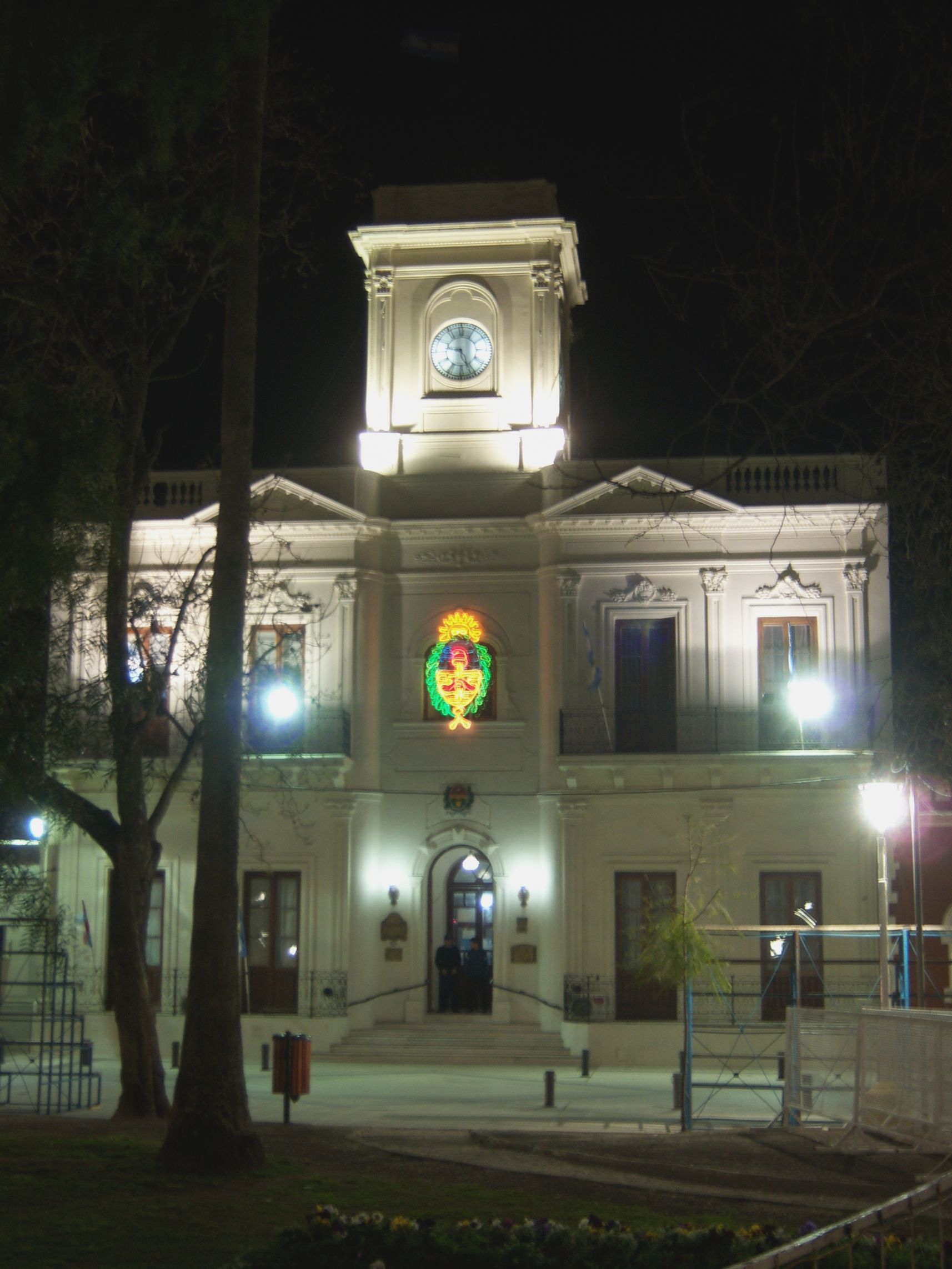
- Municipality of Nogoyá at night (2010).

- Location of Nogoyá in Argentina
- Coordinates: 32°24′S 59°48′W
- Country: Argentina
- Province: Entre Ríos
- Department: Nogoyá

Area
  - Total: 7.1 km^{2} (2.7 sq mi)

Population (2010 census)
  - Total: 22,824
  - Density: 3,200/km^{2} (8,300/sq mi)
- Time zone: UTC−3 (ART)
- CPA base: E3150
- Dialing code: +54 3435

Nogoyá (Spanish pronunciation: [noɣ̞oˈʝa]) is a city in the province of Entre Ríos, Argentina. It has 22,824 inhabitants per the 2010 census [INDEC] and is the head town of the Nogoyá Department. It lies in the province's southwest, by the Nogoyá Stream (a tributary of the Paraná River), about 95 km southeast from the provincial capital Paraná, on National Route 12.

== History ==
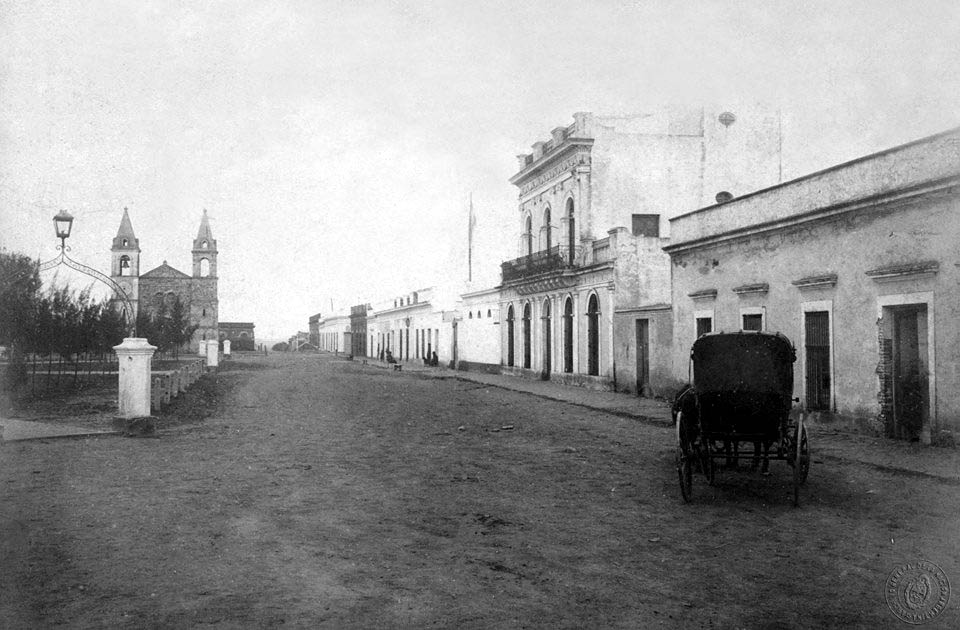
View of the city in 1887. At the left background, the "Basílica Nuestra Señora del Carmen".

The town of Nogoyá has a rich history that dates back to around 1760, when it started as an informal settlement by the Nogoyá River. The name 'Nogoyá' itself means 'Wild Water'. In 1782, Father Fernando Andrés Quiroga y Taboada built a chapel to serve the region. This place of worship, now the Basilica of Nuestra Señora del Carmen, served as a focal point for more settlers and is considered the foundational event of Nogoyá.

Nogoyá, a town rich in culture, was recognized as a town in 1826. There is no exact date for the foundation's anniversary. Still, locals observe City Celebration Day on July 16, the same day that Roman Catholics celebrate the Virgin under the invocation of "Nuestra Señora del Carmen;" She is considered the spiritual mother of the town. Every year, on July 16, the venerated image is taken out of the temple and carried by volunteers through the streets of Nogoyá, followed by thousands of pilgrims. At the end of her pilgrimage, she returns to the Basilica, receiving a salute of white tissues shaken in the air by the multitude. The image is honored with a unique crown, called Alianza de las Alianzas ("alliance of alliances"), made of gold and jewelry, including wedding rings, offered by settlers.

Cipriano Urquiza, the brother of provincial caudillo Justo José de Urquiza, was murdered in Nogoyá in 1844. In 1849, the town was assigned its own Partido, or county, and made its capital. In 1860, the city was the convention seat that reformed Entre Ríos's Constitution. The Entre Ríos Central Railway arrived in Nogoyá in 1887.

A center of cattle ranching in the 19th century, the area around Nogoyá has seen significant economic growth. From a growing number of dairy farms during the 20th century to the establishment of La Sibila, the most significant dairy that now processes over 1,000,000 liters of powdered milk a day, Nogoyá's economy is thriving. Other critical installations include a Molinos Río de la Plata mill, Nogopaint, and a microbrewery, Cerveza Nogoyá.

The completion of the Rosario-Victoria Bridge in 2003, which gave Nogoyá a direct highway link to Rosario, further bolstered the city's economy.

== Economy ==
The main economic activity in the area is the dairy industry (producing milk and cheese), which makes Nogoyá the unofficial dairy capital in Entre Ríos. Agriculture is also significant, featuring wheat, corn, sorghum, sunflower, and soybean crops. Additionally, Nogoyá has gained recognition as the hometown of Emilia Mernes, a prominent singer and actress whose international success has brought cultural attention to the city.

== Notable people ==
- Roque Alfaro (born 1956), football player and coach
- Fermín Chávez (1924–2004), historian
- Carlos Contín (1915–1991), Governor of Entre Ríos (1963–66) and Chairman of the UCR (1981–83)
- Juan Carlos Ghiano (born 1920), writer, essayist and playwright
- Raymundo Salvat (1881–1940), lawyer, author of the Treaty on Civil Law
- Luis María Sobrón (1932–2010), poet
- Juan León Solas (1787–1841), military governor of Entre Ríos
- Emilia Mernes (b.1996), singer, songwriter, dancer and model.
