= Fermín Chávez =

Argentine historian, poet and journalist (1924–2006)

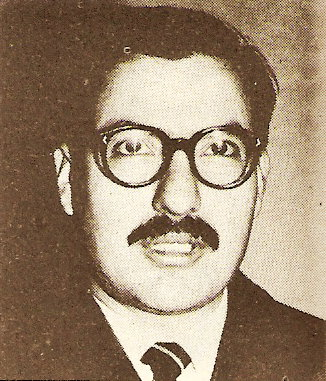
Fermín Chávez in 1979

Fermín Chávez (Nogoyá 13 July 1924 – 28 May 2006) was an Argentine historian, poet and journalist, born in El Pueblito, a small town near Nogoyá, province of Entre Ríos. He studied humanities in Córdoba, philosophy in Buenos Aires, and devoted three years to the study of theology, canon law, archaeology and Ancient Hebrew in Cuzco, Peru.

Under the rule of Juan Perón (1946–1955) he was a militant Justicialist, close to Eva Perón, whom he met in 1950. He joined the Peronist cause along with other Catholic intellectuals, like his friend José María Castiñeira de Dios. He then formed part of the resistance to those who ousted Perón in 1955, and was a member of the delegation that returned with Perón to Argentina after his exile in Spain, in 1973.

His journalistic career started in 1947 the nationalistic newspaper Tribuna. He wrote in Peronist publications and in the newspapers La Capital (Rosario), La Opinión, Mayoría, and Clarín. He also collaborated with magazines, dictionaries and encyclopedias; in 1949 founded the poetry magazine Nombre, and in 1967, Ahijuna. He was the press chief of the state oil company YPF from 1970 to 1973, and worked in the official press of the city of Buenos Aires during the administration of General José Embrioni, since 1973. He was also a professor of History of Education in the Faculty of Philosophy and Letters of the University of Buenos Aires.

As a revisionist, he questioned the traditional, "official" version of Argentine history, such as the view of founding fathers as flawless, unquestionable idols. He wrote more than 40 books about different aspects of this history, including some about caudillos, Peronism, and Che Guevara, and supervised an edition of the complete works of Juan Perón. He also completed José María Rosa's Historia Argentina. In 2004 he published a History and Anthology of Gauchesque Poetry.

Chávez died in 2006 at the age of 81, in Buenos Aires, after being hospitalized due to heart problems.

== Publications ==
- Civilization and barbarism in the history of the culture of Argentina, 1a. ed. Buenos Aires: Trafac, 1956; 2a. ed. 1965; 3a. ed. revised and enlarged, Buenos Aires: Ed Theoria, 1974.
- The story around the house (with Ignacio Corbalán). Buenos Aires: Publishing Center of Latin America, 1971.
- Jose Hernandez, 1a. ed. Buenos Aires: Argentine Cultural Issues, 1959; 2a. ed. Buenos Aires: Ed Plus Ultra, 1973
- Alberdi and Mitrismo. Buenos Aires: Peña Lillo, 1961.
- Poetry "rioplatense" gaucho style. Buenos Aires: Argentine Cultural Issues, 192.
- José Luis Busaniche. Buenos Aires: Argentine Cultural Editions, 1964.
- The return of Jose Hernandez. Federalism to the liberal republic. Buenos Aires: Ed Theory lessons, 1973
- The culture at the time of Rosas. Contributions to mental decolonization Argentina. Buenos Aires: Ed Theory lessons, 1973
- "Perón and Peronism" in contemporary history. Buenos Aires: East, 1975. ISBN 950-9048-34-8
- Eva Perón in history. Buenos Aires: East, 1986. ISBN 950-9048-44-5
- Eva Perón without myths. Buenos Aires: Ed Fraternal, 1990. ISBN 950-9097-92-6 (ed. augmented and corrected Buenos Aires: Ed Theory lessons, 1996. ISBN 987-9048-11-3)
- Here I sing: poets and troubadours del Plata. Buenos Aires: Ed Theory lessons, 1993. ISBN 987-99211-1-9
- Historicism and Enlightenment culture in Argentina. Buenos Aires: Centro Latin America Editor, 1982. ISBN 950-25-0640-5
- Perón and Peronism. Buenos Aires: Centro Latin America Editor, 1984
- History of the Argentine nation. 3rd ed. Buenos Aires: Ed Theoria, 1978 (7th ed., Revised and enlarged. Buenos Aires: Ed Theoria, 1985)
- The National Thought-breviary and itinerary Buenos Aires: Ed New Generation – Pleamar, 1999.
- The spark of Perón: The art of politics in seventy stories with humor, sarcasm and judgment. San Martín (Buenos Aires): Pitcher, 1990. ISBN 950-99091-8-1
- Life and death of Lopez Jordan. Buenos Aires: Ed Theoria, 1957.
- A province east (poems). Ed of Entre Ríos, 1993 (reed.)
- Roses book. Buenos Aires: National Institute of Historical Research Juan Manuel de Rosas, 1995.
- Don Juan Don Juan Manuel Bautista. Buenos Aires: National Institute of Historical Research Juan Manuel de Rosas, 1997.
- Castañeda. Buenos Aires: National Institute of Historical Research Juan Manuel de Rosas, 1998. ISBN 987-9278-09-7
- Peronism seen by Victor Frankl. Buenos Aires: Ed Theory lessons, 1999. ISBN 987-9048-30-X
- Poems and matreras matreros. Buenos Aires: Ed Theory lessons, 1999. ISBN 987-9048-26-1
- Herder, German outlaw. Buenos Aires: Ed New Generation, 2004. ISBN 987-43-7390-3
- Alpargatas and books – Dictionary of Peronist culture. Buenos Aires: Ed Theoria, 2004. ISBN 987-9048-51-2
- 45 poems paleoperonistas (with Aurora Venturini . Buenos Aires: Ed Pueblo Entero, 1997. ISBN 987-9148-01-0
- Ten children of Evita (Foreword by Angel Nunez]. Buenos Aires: Ed New Generation, 2005. Collection National Consciousness: History. ISBN 987-9030-49-4
- Another round with Martin Fierro. Buenos Aires: Ediciones Theoria, 1999. ISBN 987-9048-28-8
- Flora and fauna in the Martín Fierro. Paraná: Editorial Entre Ríos, 1997. ISBN 950-686-060-2
- National consciousness: History of his eclipse and recovery. Buenos Aires: Ediciones Theoria. ISBN 987-99211-9-4
- Goya in Argentina: The punishment of a genius misleading. Buenos Aires: Ediciones Pueblo Entero, 1995. ISBN 987-99211-6-X
- Because this is another key. Vico Wittgenstein. Buenos Aires: Ediciones Pueblo Entero, 1992. ISBN 987-99211-2-7
- Social-Democracy?, Why?. Buenos Aires: Ediciones Pequén, 1984. ISBN 950-9333-05-0
- Chacho Life. Buenos Aires: Ediciones Theoria, 1a. 1962 edition, 2a. expanded edition 1967, 3rd. enlarged edition 1974.
- Che, Peron and León Felipe. Buenos Aires: New Generation, 2002.
- History and Anthology of Poetry Gauchesca. Buenos Aires: Ediciones Margus, 2004. ISBN 950-9534-08-0 .
- Seven Scholia About Peron. Buenos Aires: Ediciones Theoria, 2000. ISBN 987-9048-38-5
- Evita is a single. Buenos Aires: Corregidor, 1999. ISBN 950-05-1233-5

== Sources ==
- Página/12, 29 May 2006. El refutador de la historia oficial.
- La Nación, 29 May 2006. Falleció el historiador Fermín Chávez.
