= Civilization and barbarism =

The Civilization and Barbarism was a dichotomy used during the Argentine Civil War by the Unitarian Party. The dichotomy can be found in books such as Facundo, by Domingo Faustino Sarmiento, or The New Troy by the contemporary French Alexandre Dumas, who wrote it based on reports by the Unitarian Melchor Pacheco.

In this dichotomy, "civilization" makes reference to the values and ideas of Europe, and "barbarism" to the rejection of them. Unitarians thought that Buenos Aires should impose those values to the other regions of the country. The Federal party thought instead that the country should follow its own traditions and develop their own political systems, allowing autonomy to each region.

Various groups of European immigrants also embraced the concept of bringing civilization and uplifting Argentina as a way to carve out a place for themselves in the new society.

== See also ==
- Argentine Civil War
