= José Rivera Indarte =

Argentine poet and journalist (1814–1845)

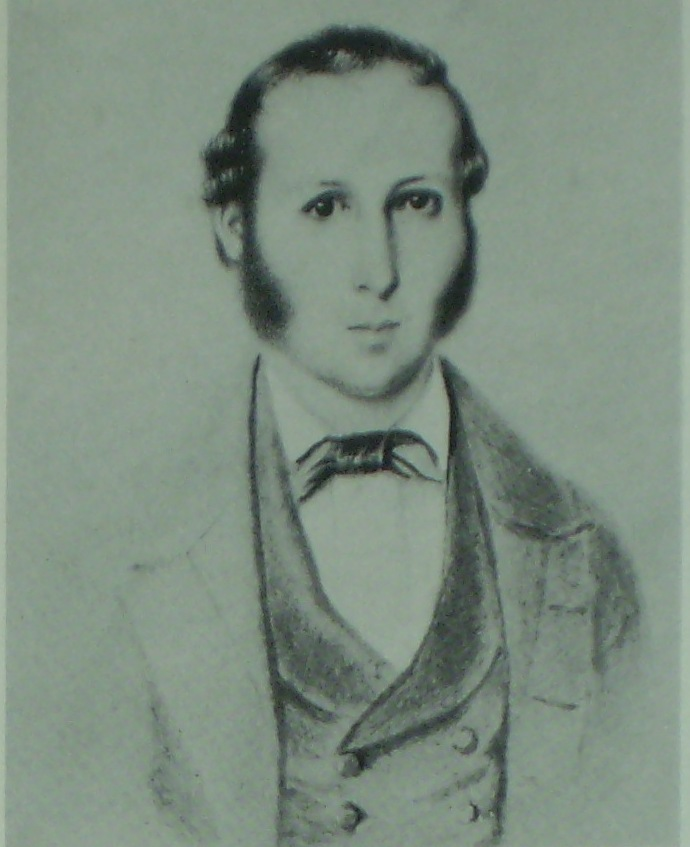
- Born: 1814; Cordoba, Viceroyalty of Rio de la Plata
- Died: 1845 (aged 30–31); Santa Catarina, Brasil
- Occupations: Journalist, poet
- Writing career
- Language: Spanish

José Rivera Indarte (1814 in Córdoba – 1845 in Santa Catarina) was an Argentine poet and journalist. He was at times both a supporter and critic of Juan Manuel de Rosas, writing first the "Anthem of the Restorers" and later the "Blood tables".

== Early political career ==
Indarte studied in Buenos Aires, and developed a taste for poetry. He later moved to Montevideo, where he wrote the newspaper "El Investigador" (The Investigator). He was deported back to Buenos Aires by Uruguayan President Fructuoso Rivera, at the request of his minister Manuel Oribe. In Buenos Aires, he joined the federalist party and wrote a poem comparing Rosas with an ear of corn ("Mazorca") because of his blond hair. The members of the Popular Restoring Society would take the name "Mazorca" as a distinctive name. He also wrote the "Anthem of the Restorers" for Rosas; Rosas was then known as the "Restorer of laws".

== Move to Montevideo ==
In 1837, Indarte started to be monitored by the Popular Restoring Society, and left the country. Unitarians state that he escaped from Rosas' political persecution, Federals consider that he had committed acts of fraud and falsification. He stayed some months in Europe, and then moved back to Montevideo. He supported Juan Lavalle, and urged him to join the French armies that were attacking the Confederation by that time.

In 1841 Rosas survived a terrorist attack made with a gift that secretly contained a complex mechanism of guns, which would fire in all directions when opened. The mechanism failed and did not fire, and Indarte was accused of being responsible for it.

== The Blood Tables ==
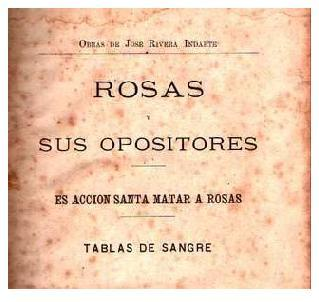
The "Blood Tables"

In 1843 the French firm Lafone & Co. hired Indarte to write an account of deaths caused in Argentina by the government of Rosas; the resulting document was known as the Blood tables. The deal specified that he would be paid a penny for each death listed. The list included deaths caused by military actions of the unitarians (including Lavalle's invasion of Buenos Aires), soldiers shot during wartime because of mutiny, treason or espionage, victims of common crimes and even people who were still alive. He also listed NN deaths (unidentified people), and some entries were repeated more than once. He also blamed Rosas for the death of Facundo Quiroga. Indarte listed 480 deaths, and was paid with two Pound sterling (U$S 8.400 in modern prices). He tried to add to the list another 22.560 names, the number of deaths caused by military conflicts in Argentina from 1829 to that date, but the French refused to pay for them.

Indarte died in Brazil in 1845.

== Bibliography ==
- O'Donnell, Pacho (2009). Juan Manuel de Rosas, el maldito de la historia oficial. Buenos Aires: Grupo Editorial Norma. pp. 271–272. ISBN 978-987-545-555-9.
