= Southampton Old Cemetery =

Cemetery in Southampton, Hampshire, England

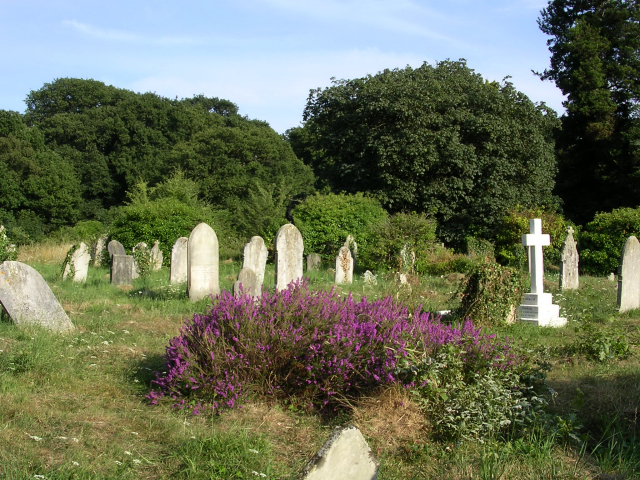
- Graves in the Old Cemetery
- Interactive map of Southampton Old Cemetery

Details
- Established: 7 May 1846
- Location: Cemetery Road, Southampton
- Country: England
- Coordinates: 50°55′13″N 1°24′47″W
- Type: Municipal
- Owned by: Southampton City Council
- Size: 27 acres (11 ha)
- No. of graves: 116,800

The cemetery has had various titles including The Cemetery by the Common, Hill Lane Cemetery and is currently known as Southampton Old Cemetery. An Act of Parliament was required in 1843 to acquire the land from Southampton Common. It covers an area of 27 acres (11 ha) and the total number of burials is estimated at 116,800. Currently there are 6 to 8 burials a year to existing family plots.

== History ==
On 9 November 1841, Southampton Town Council resolved "that the Town Clerk be directed to give notice of an application to parliament at the next session for establishing a cemetery or burial ground on part of Southampton Common". The town council approached John Claudius Loudon. He was a well known landscaper, designer of arboretums and cemeteries including Histon Road Cemetery at Cambridge and Bath Abbey Cemetery. Loudon, normally based in London, had been staying on the Isle of Wight whilst his wife was writing a book. The damp sea air had a debilitating effect on his health and he moved to take temporary lodgings in Southampton. Southampton Town council had no previous experience of laying out a cemetery and was pleased that Loudon was conveniently available. They paid him £37 for his services, but decided not to use his proposed layout. The Bishop of Winchester was not willing to concede that the proposed Anglican chapel would adjoin a nonconformist chapel.

=== Competition ===
As was customary in the planning of early cemeteries, the council held a competition and asked for suggested layouts to replace the one made by Loudon. A design by William Rogers, a local nurseryman and councillor, was accepted and he was awarded the contract.

=== Opening ===
The cemetery was opened on 7 May 1846 when the Bishop of Winchester consecrated part of the grounds. A section was left unconsecrated for the "Dissenters" (non-conformists) and agnostics while another part was provided for the Hebrew community. In 1856, the Roman Catholics were given ground within the cemetery for their use.

The Southampton Cemetery Act 1843 allowed for up to 15 acres (6.1 ha) to be taken from the common but it was initially laid out as a 10 acres (4.0 ha) site with the remaining 5 acres (2.0 ha) being added in 1863. In 1884 a further act of parliament was obtained to transfer another 12 acres (4.9 ha) to the cemetery.

== Notable incumbents and memorials ==
The cemetery has 60 headstones associated with RMS Titanic, although no bodies were returned to Southampton.

Charlie Barr (1864–1911), the three times winner of the America's Cup, is also buried in the cemetery.

Charles Rawden Maclean (1815–1880), alias "John Ross" friend of King Shaka and an opponent of slavery, died on board a ship bound for Southampton and was buried in a pauper's grave. On 2 May 2009, the grave was marked with a headstone in a ceremony attended by representatives of his home town, Fraserburgh, and of the Zulu nation.

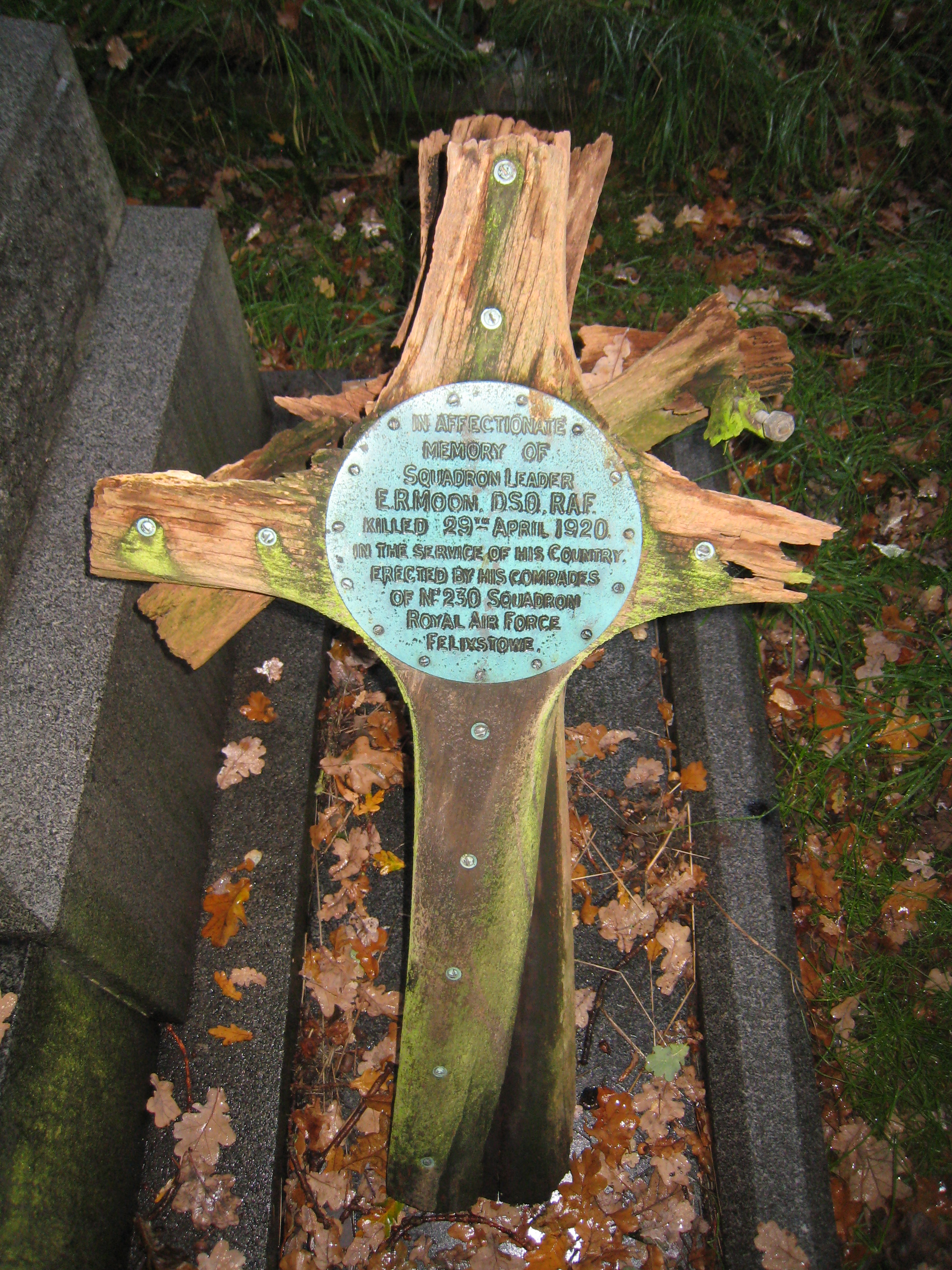
Edwin Moon's grave marker

Squadron Leader Edwin Moon (1886–1920), has a grave marker made from the propeller of the aircraft in which he was killed in 1920.

Moon is one of 140 identified casualties in the cemetery whose graves are registered and maintained by the Commonwealth War Graves Commission, 125 from World War I and 15 from World War II. A war graves plot contains the graves of 21 Belgian servicemen.

The Robert Pearce family grave is marked by a sculpture depicting the figures of Faith, Hope and Charity, surmounted by a draped urn. The memorial was sculpted by Richard Cockle Lucas from Chilworth and is English Heritage Listed, Grade II. Captain Thomas Richard Pearce (1859–1908) survived three shipwrecks.

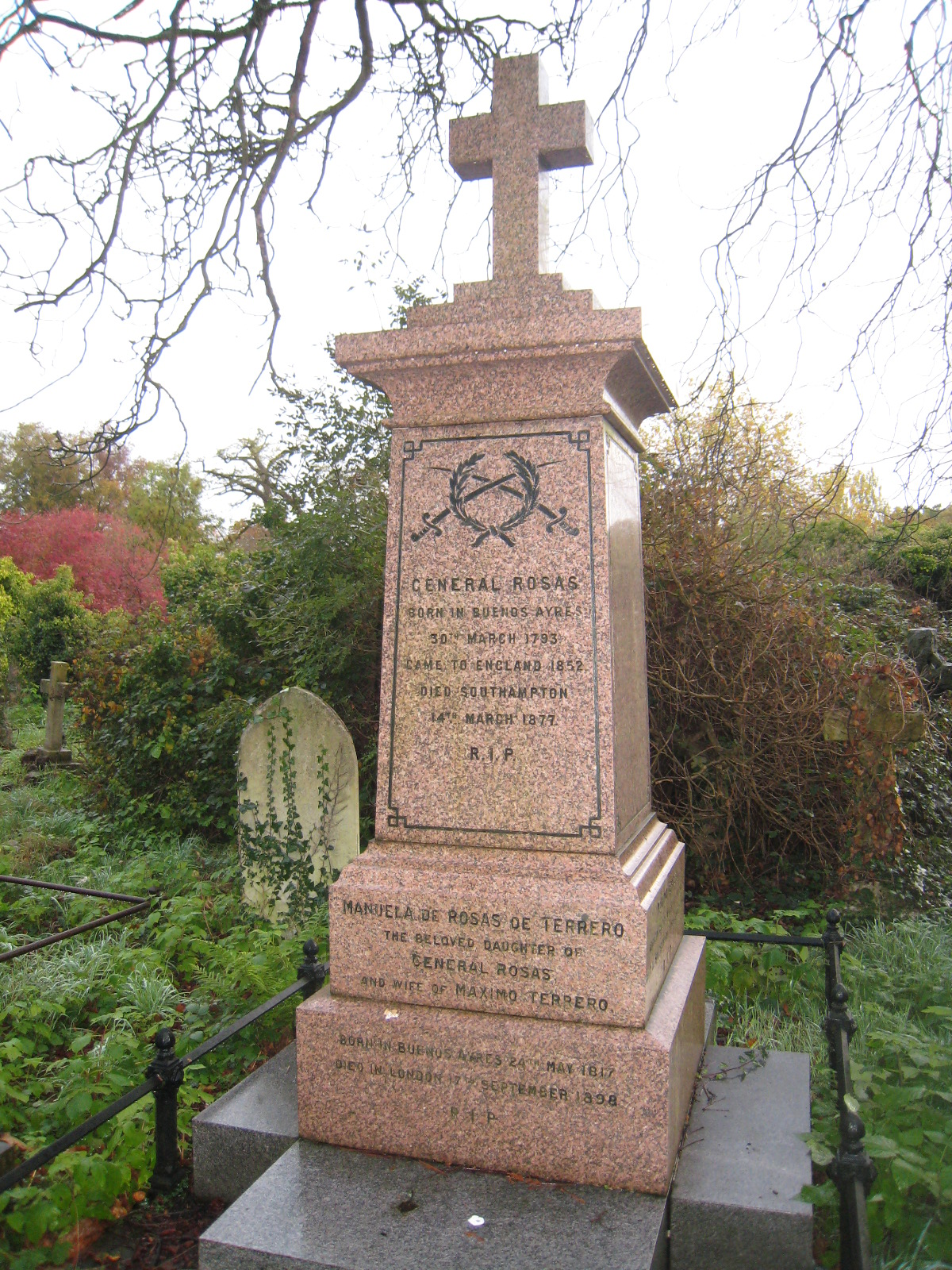
Rosas memorial in Southampton Old Cemetery.

Juan Manuel de Rosas (1793–1877), the exiled Argentine politician, was initially buried in Southampton Old Cemetery until his body was exhumed in 1989 and repatriated to the La Recoleta Cemetery in Argentina. His tomb remains as a memorial. His grandson Manuel Terrero and his wife, the militant suffragette Janie Terrero are buried here.

Edward Askew Sothern (1826–1881), Victorian comedy actor, famous as Lord Dundreary in the play Our American Cousin is buried here.

There is also a memorial to RMS Rhone, wrecked off the coast of Salt Island in the British Virgin Islands on 29 October 1867 during a hurricane with the loss of over 120 lives. The memorial was badly damaged by vandals in October 2011.

== Listed buildings ==
Most of the buildings and some memorials in the cemetery are Grade II listed structures:

- Former Jewish Mortuary Chapel (now part of a house) (c. 1850)
- Church of England Mortuary Chapel (c. 1850)
- Allen Memorial (neo-classical mausoleum dating to about 1900 built of Portland stone ashlar blocks)
- Lodge (dated 1848 and 1882)
- Gate piers to eastern gate (c. 1880)
- Pearce Memorial (erected 1861)
- Wall fronting Hill Lane (mid-19th century)
- Gates and gate piers (c. 1880)
- Nonconformist Mortuary Chapel (c. 1850)
- Gate piers to north-western gate (mid-19th century)

== Ecology ==
The cemetery's ecology is managed by the wildlife team from Southampton City Council in conjunction with Friends of Southampton Old Cemetery, a voluntary group who also take guided tours and assist families to maintain graves.

== Gallery ==
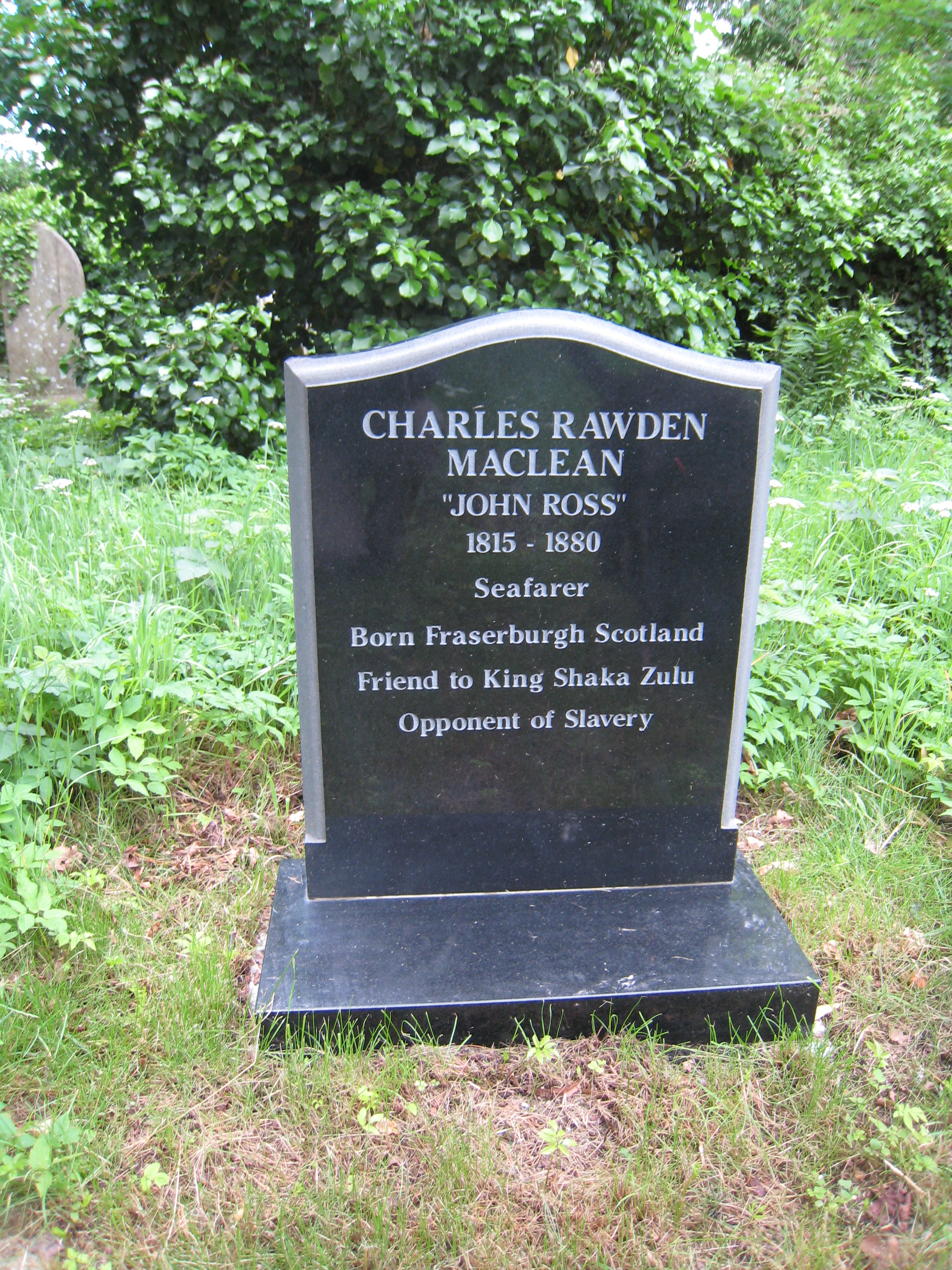
The gravestone of "John Ross"

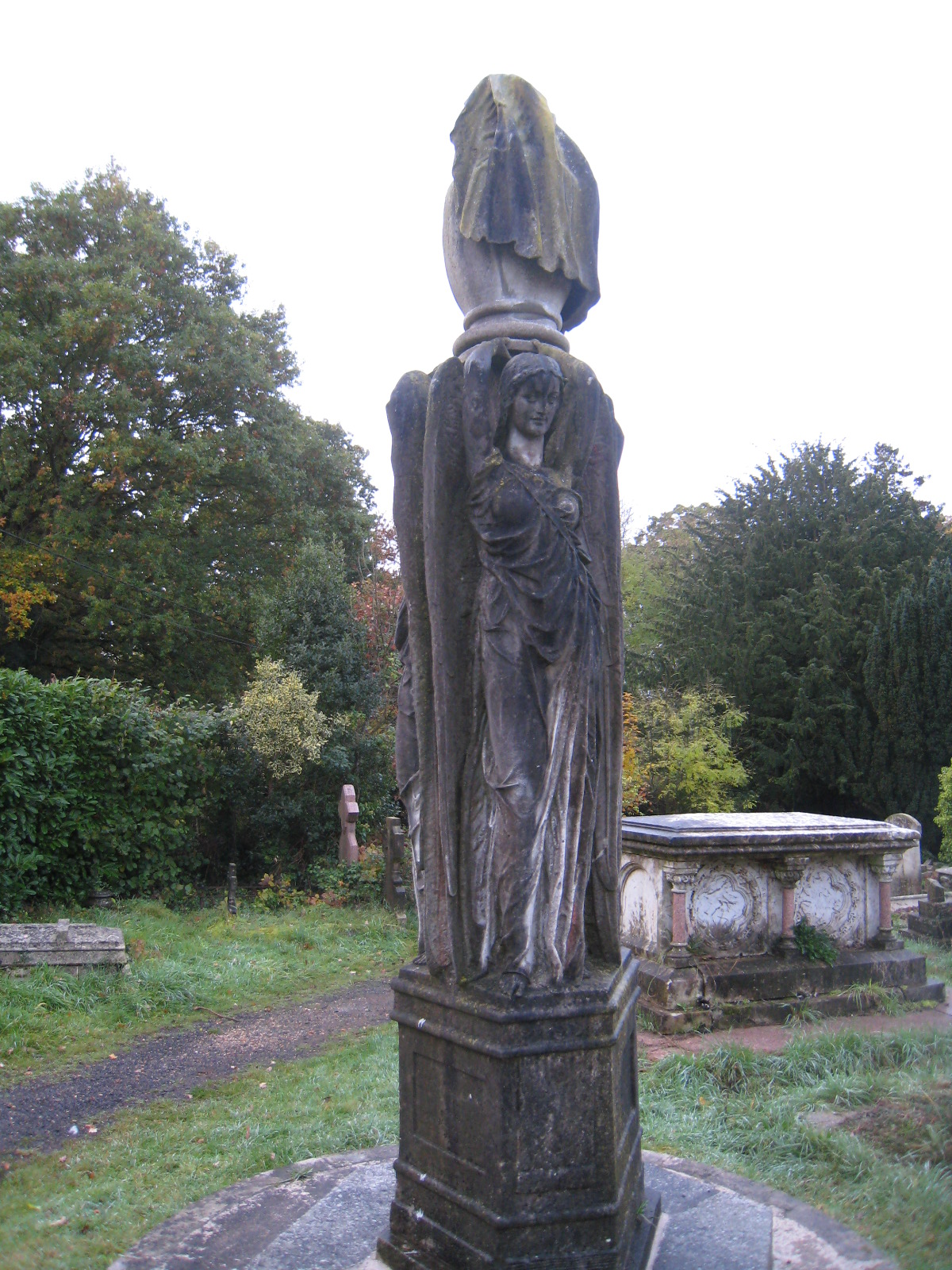
Pearce family grave

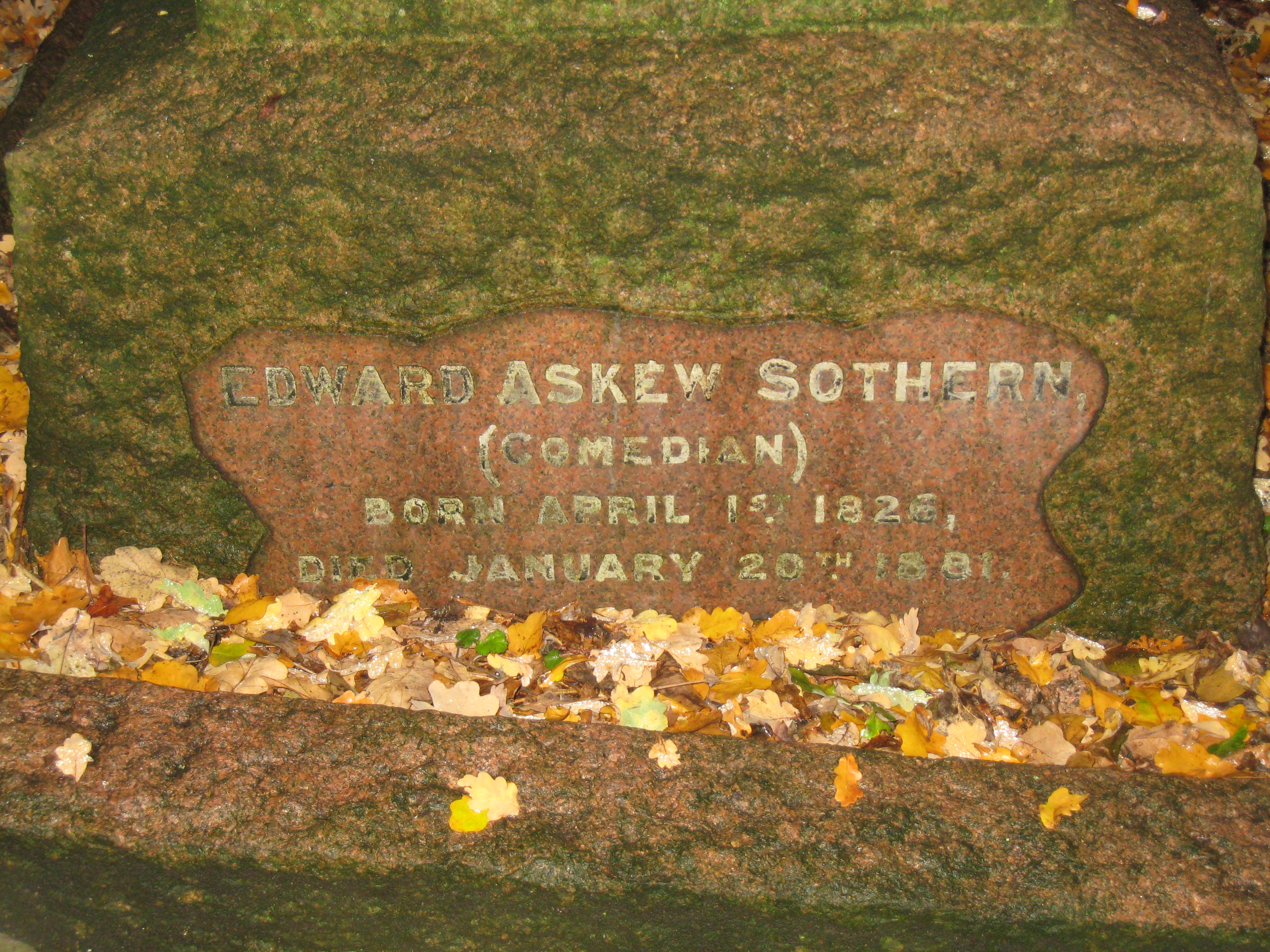
The grave of Edward Askew Sothern

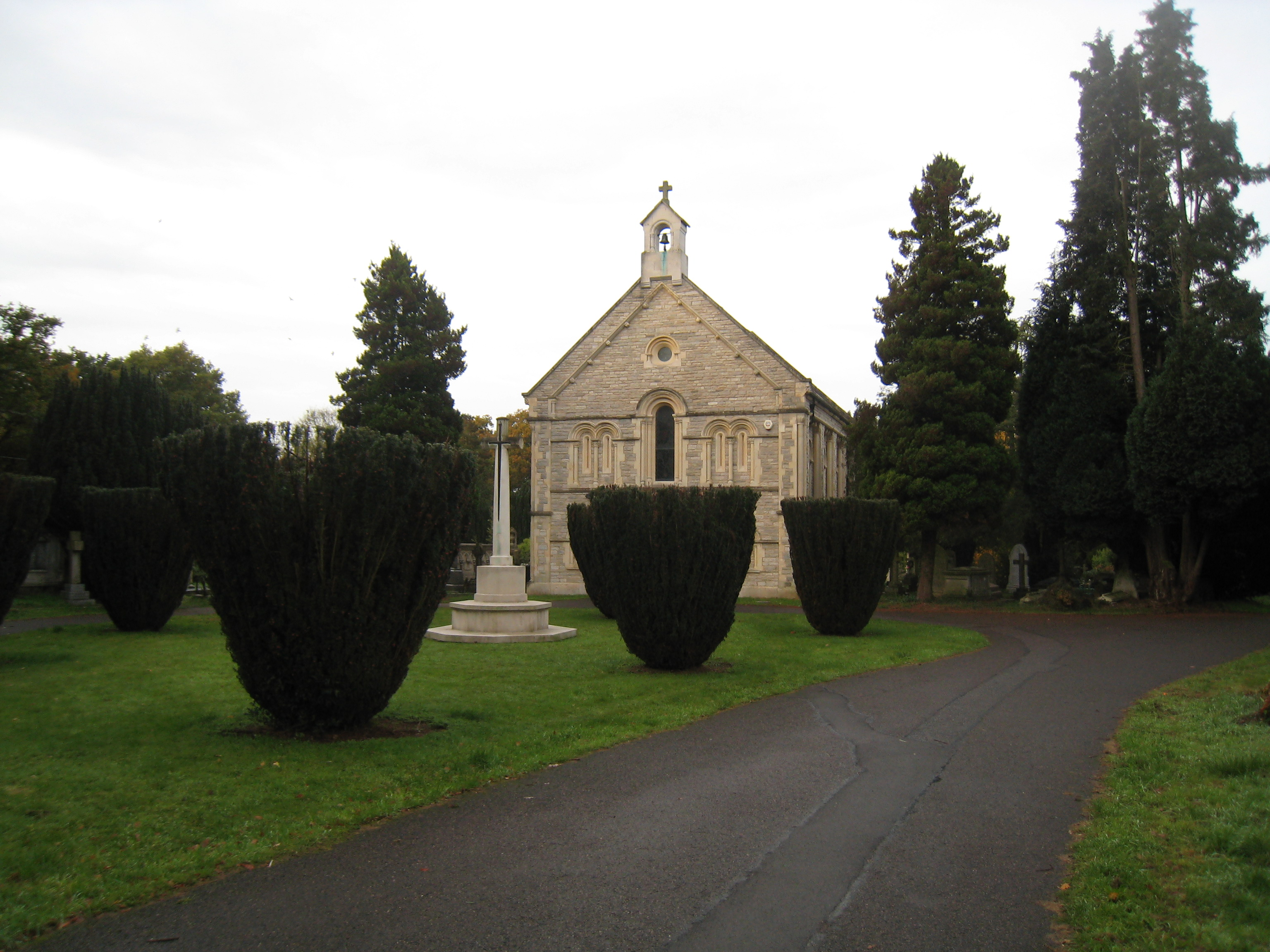
Anglican Chapel in Southampton Old Cemetery
