= José María Rosa =

Argentine historian and diplomat

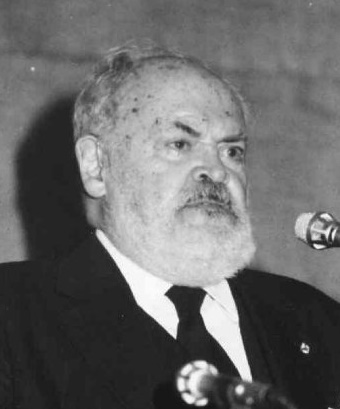
- Born: August 20, 1906; Buenos Aires, Argentina
- Died: July 2, 1991 (aged 84)
- Writing career
- Pen name: Pepe Rosa
- Language: Spanish
- Notable work: Historia Argentina
- Literary movement: Historical revisionism

José María Rosa (August 20, 1906 – July 2, 1991), also known as Pepe Rosa, was an Argentine historian, one of the most notable of the Argentine nationalist revisionist historians.

== Biography ==
Rosa was born in Buenos Aires in 1906. He studied law, later teaching history at high schools and universities. In 1938, he established the Institute of Federalist Studies in Santa Fe, studying the history of Argentina under a revisionist viewpoint. His view of the past was used to justify critics of contemporary country, and he considered that there was an ongoing neglect of national authorities of national interests since the May Revolution.

Those viewpoints, as well as the positive image of Juan Manuel de Rosas, were shared by all revisionists, but they were divided by the rise of Peronism. Unlike Julio Irazusta, who was anti-Perón, Rosa supported his government. His support increased when the Revolución Libertadora attempted a coup against Perón; he would join the Perónist resistance.

From there, Rosa started working on the history of the Argentine population, which he saw as potentially revolutionary at times, but always oppressed by the higher classes. He saw Perónism as a revolutionary movement, capable of promoting the delayed changes in society. He supported in 1956 the failed attempt of General Valle against Aramburu. Fearing a political reaction, he moved to Uruguay and then to Spain, returning in 1958. He joined the Juan Manuel de Rosas National Institute of Historical Investigations, becoming its president several times.

He was designated ambassador to Paraguay during the third government of Perón; he would resign following his death and move to Greece. He returned during the National Reorganization Process; however, his books were banned and taken out of public libraries. He founded a magazine called Línea ("The voice of those who do not have a voice"), which was censored many times. He died on July 2, 1991.

At his request, November 20 was declared National Sovereignty Day (Día de la Soberanía Nacional) in commemoration of the 1845 battle of Vuelta de Obligado. His ideas about the history of Argentina had prominent acceptance, and, according to his adherents, they are currently accepted as mainstream.

== Works ==
- Más allá del código (Beyond the code) (1933)
- Interpretación religiosa de la historia (Religious interpretation of history) (1936)
- Defensa y pérdida de nuestra independencia económica (Defense and loss of our economic independence) (1943)
- Artigas, prócer de la nacionalidad (Artigas, leader of nationality) (1949)
- La misión García ante Lord Strangford (The García mission before Lord Strangford) (1951)
- El cóndor ciego; la extraña muerte de Lavalle (The blind cóndor; Lavalle's strange death) (1952)
- Nos, los representantes del pueblo (We, the people's representatives) (1955)
- Del municipio indiano a la provincia Argentina (From the Indian municipality to the Argentine province) (1958)
- La caída de Rosas (The fall of Rosas) (1958)
- El pronunciamiento de Urquiza (The uprising of Urquiza) (1960)
- Artigas, la revolución de mayo y la unidad Hispano-americana (Artigas, the May Revolution and the Hispanic-American unit) (1960)
- El revisionismo responde (Revisionism answers) (1964)
- Rivadavia y el imperialismo financiero (Rivadavia and financial imperialism) (1964)
- La guerra del Paraguay y las montoneras argentinas (The war of Paraguay and the Argentine montoneras) (1965)
- Doctores, militares e ingleses en la independencia nacional (Doctors, military and English people in the national independence) (1968)
- Historia del revisionismo (History of revisionism) (1968)
- Rosas, nuestro contemporáneo (Rosas, our contemporary) (1970)
- Historia Argentina (Argentine History; 13 volumes) (1970)
- El fetiche de la constitución (The fetish of the constitution) (1984)
- Análisis de la dependencia Argentina (Analysis of the Argentine dependency) (?)

== Bibliography ==
- Gelman, Jorge; Raúl Fradkin (2010). Doscientos años pensando la Revolución de Mayo. Buenos Aires: Sudamericana. ISBN 978-950-07-3179-9.
- Jose Maria Rosa. Historia del revisionismo y otros ensayos. Editorial Merlín, Buenos Aires, 1968.
