= Pact of San José de Flores =

1859 treaty between Argentina and Buenos Aires

- Stamp commemorating the centennial of the 1859 Pact of San José de Flores
- Date: November 11, 1859
- Location: Flores, Buenos Aires
- Also known as: Pacto Unión San José de Flores; Pacto de Unión Nacional
- Participants: State of Buenos Aires: Juan Bautista Peña and Carlos Tejedor; Argentine Confederation: Tomás Guido, Daniel Aráoz, and Juan Esteban Pedernera; Mediator: Francisco Solano López (Paraguay).
- Outcome: Province of Buenos Aires readmitted into the Argentine Confederation. Agreement proved tentative until the 1861 Battle of Pavón affirmed Buenos Aires' position.

The Pact of San José de Flores (Pacto Unión San José de Flores, or Pacto de Unión Nacional) was a treaty signed between the Argentine Confederation and the State of Buenos Aires on November 11, 1859, on the aftermath of the Battle of Cepeda. It established guidelines for the entry of the latter into the Confederation, and Buenos Aires' acceptance of the Argentine Constitution of 1853.

== Overview ==
=== Background ===
The Argentine Confederation, consisting of thirteen provinces in the interior, and the State of Buenos Aires, formed by the Province of Buenos Aires had divided what today is Argentina since the 1852 Battle of Caseros removed the paramount Governor of Buenos Aires, Juan Manuel de Rosas (who had wielded the sum of public power since 1835, thereby keeping the nation tenuously united). The division was caused by the refusal of Buenos Aires to endorse the San Nicolás Agreement of 1853 or to recognize the Constitution of Argentina, promulgated that year.

The most contentious issue remained the Buenos Aires Customs, which remained under the control of the city government and was the chief source of public revenue. Nations with which the Confederation maintained foreign relations, moreover, kept all embassies in Buenos Aires (rather than in the capital, Paraná).

The Buenos Aires government also enjoyed numerous alliances in the hinterland, including that of Santiago del Estero Province (led by Manuel Taboada), as well as among powerful Liberal Party governors in Salta, Corrientes, Tucumán and San Juan. The 1858 assassination of San Juan's Federalist governor, Nazario Benavídez, by Liberals inflamed tensions between the Confederation and the State of Buenos Aires. Relations deteriorated further with the signing of a free trade agreement between the Port of Rosario (the chief Confederate port) and the Port of Montevideo to the detriment of Buenos Aires. The election of Valentín Alsina as Governor of Buenos Aires made hostilities imminent, culminating in the Battle of Cepeda of October 23, 1859.

Buenos Aires forces, led by General Bartolomé Mitre, were defeated by those led by the President of the Confederacy, Justo José de Urquiza. Ordered to subjugate Buenos Aires separatists by force, Urquiza instead invited the defeated to a round of negotiations. The son of the President of Paraguay, General Francisco Solano López, had attempted to prevent the Battle of Cepeda, persuaded Governor Alsina to accept Urquiza's offer, and a meeting place was soon arranged in the village of San José de Flores (west of the capital), by Buenos Aires emissaries Juan Bautista Peña (Minister of the Economy) and jurist Carlos Tejedor.

=== Negotiations ===
Buenos Aires was represented by Peña, Tejedor and Antonio Cruz Obligado. The Confederation was represented by Senate Vice President Tomás Guido, Urquiza, San Luis Province Governor Juan Esteban Pedernera (who had played a decisive military role at Cepeda), and Jujuy Province Governor Daniel Aráoz.

The negotiations were guarded by Urquiza's forces, despite objections to this by Buenos Aires delegates. Urquiza, furthermore, demanded the resignation of Buenos Aires Governor Alsina and his cabinet. Faced with the threat of invasion, Alsina's government resigned, and he was replaced by Vice Governor Felipe Llavallol.

Following an impasse, General López succeeded in restarting talks on November 9, and on November 11, the Pact of National Union was signed.

=== Treaty and terms ===
The final text closely followed President Urquiza's stipulations, though with a number of concessions toward Buenos Aires. The principal terms were:

- Buenos Aires was declared part of the Argentine Confederation.
- The city government would convene a provincial convention to review and propose amendments to the National Constitution.
- Any amendments would be discussed by a National Constitutional Convention, meeting in Santa Fe, with the participation of all provinces.
- The territory of Buenos Aires could not be divided without the consent of the Provincial Legislature. This was prescient because of the Constitutional stipulation that the nation's capital was the city of Buenos Aires as a federal district; the creation of such as district would by definition separate it from the surrounding province.
- Buenos Aires would forfeit any diplomatic relations.
- The Province of Buenos Aires would retain all public properties and buildings, with the exception of the Customs, which would be nationalized.
- Blanket amnesty would be declared for all participants in the past disputes, and for any actions pursuant to those disputes.
- The occupying Argentine Army would withdraw from the Province of Buenos Aires.

=== Aftermath ===
The constitutional convention ultimately met on September 14, 1860, and approved the amendments outlined in the treaty on September 23. Elections on March 6, 1860, resulted in victory for the incumbent Federalist Party, electing Santiago Derqui (who had administered San Juan Province following the Benavídez assassination, and whom Urquiza trusted) and General Pedernera. The influence of the new governor of Buenos Aires, Bartolomé Mitre, on the Derqui presidency was strong, and Mitre obtained numerous important bills from Derqui, including an extension on the province's customs house concession and measures benefiting the Bank of the Province of Buenos Aires, whose currency was authorized for use as legal tender at the customs house (thereby controlling much of the nation's foreign trade). These concessions would strain Derqui's relations with Urquiza, who had been returned as governor of Entre Ríos, though the enactment of the new constitution on October 8 temporarily placated ongoing tensions.

This impasse continued until, on November 16, Domingo Sarmiento organized a revolt in his native San Juan Province, leading to Governor José Antonio Virasoro's murder and renewed hostilities. The insurrection spread to neighboring Córdoba Province, which the president (who was from Córdoba) attempted to quell by personally assuming the governor's post.

The absence of the president from the nation's capital led to Mitre's abrogation of the Pact of San José de Flores and -inevitably- to renewed civil war. These hostilities culminated in the September 17, 1861, Battle of Pavón, and the victory on the part of Mitre and Buenos Aires over Urquiza's national forces. President Derqui resigned, and the national government was taken by Mitre who, despite victory, reaffirmed his commitment to the 1860 constitutional amendments and was to be elected the first president of the reunited Argentine Republic on September 4, 1862.
