= Pastor Obligado =

Argentine lawyer and lawmaker

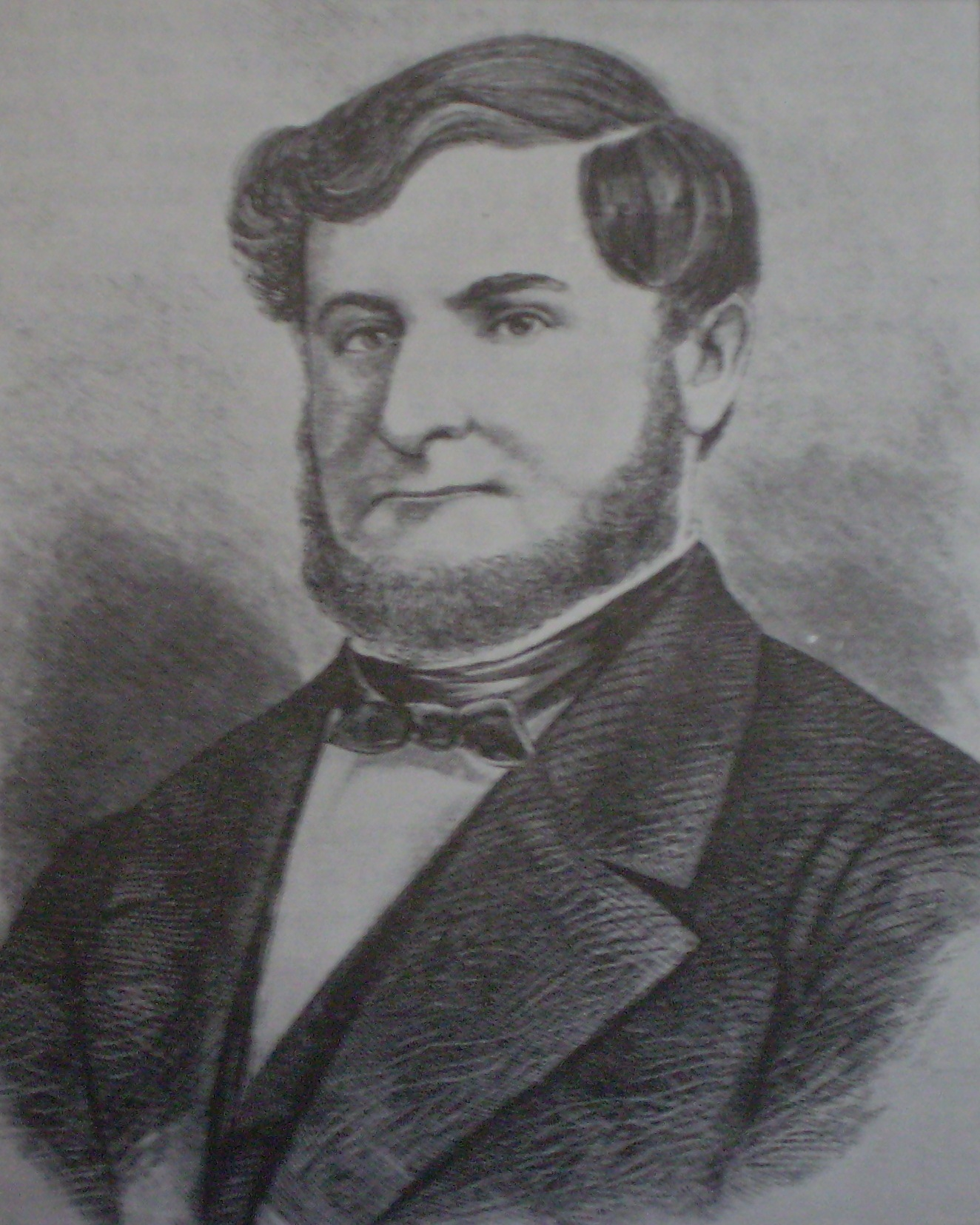

Governor of the State of Buenos Aires
- In office June 28, 1853 – December 21, 1858
- Preceded by: Manuel Guillermo Pinto
- Succeeded by: Valentín Alsina

Personal details
- Born: August 9, 1818 Buenos Aires
- Died: March 12, 1870 (aged 51) Jesús María, Córdoba
- Party: Unitarian Party
- Spouse: Fortunata Gómez
- Education: University of Buenos Aires
- Occupation: Lawyer

Pastor Obligado (August 9, 1818 – March 12, 1870) was an Argentine lawyer and lawmaker who served as Governor of the secessionist State of Buenos Aires from 1853 to 1858.

== Life and times ==
=== Early life and career ===
Obligado was born in Buenos Aires to Juana María Tejedor and Manuel Obligado. The elder Obligado had enrolled at the bar at the Royal Audiencia of Charcas, was among the signatories of the Open Cabildo of May 22, 1810, that ushered the May Revolution, and served as Economy Minister for the subsequent Directorate.

The younger Obligado married the former Fortunata Gómez in 1839, and they had four children. He earned a law degree at the University of Buenos Aires in 1845, and despite having publicly supported Governor Juan Manuel de Rosas, Obligado was appointed provincial circuit judge the day after Rosas' 1852 overthrow. He advocated against Buenos Aires' ratification of the San Nicolás Agreement, and became one of a leading group of Unitarian Party lawmakers most opposed to any pact signed with the now paramount Entre Ríos Governor, Justo José de Urquiza.

This group, which also included Adolfo Alsina, Valentín Alsina, José Mármol, and Carlos Tejedor, spearheaded the September 11, 1852, establishment of the State of Buenos Aires, seceding from the Argentine Confederation led by Urquiza. Obligado's advocacy on behalf of the Port of Buenos Aires and the Buenos Aires Customs (the chief sources of public revenue), as well as the support from Domingo Sarmiento and Rufino de Elizalde helped result in his election as Governor by the Legislature on June 28, 1853.

=== Tenure as Governor ===
Governor Obligado obtained passeage of the Constitution of Buenos Aires on April 12, 1854, and initiated an ambitious public works program, installing the first gas lamps and running water system in the city, and establishing what later became the Colegio Nacional de Buenos Aires, as well as a network of public primary schools for the largely illiterate population at the time. The 1854 constitution, drafted by Dalmacio Vélez Sársfield, asserted the sovereignty of Buenos Aires, including its right to engage in its own diplomatic relations, as well as a bicameral legislature and freedom of worship.

Obligado reformed the practice of emphyteusis, after which land could be sold at a regulated rate of 16,000 silver pesos (pesos fuerte, nearly at par with the U.S. dollar) per square league (4,428 acres). He established a national mint under the auspices of the Bank of the Province of Buenos Aires, and subsidies for industry and commerce; on August 30, 1857, the recently established Buenos Aires Western Railway inaugurated its first line, designed by British engineer William Bragge.

Obligado attended the first demonstration of the telegraph in Argentina on October 14, 1855. The event, coordinated by French engineer Adolphe Bertonnet, failed to persuade the governor, however, despite its enthusiastic coverage by the official news daily, Dalmacio Vélez Sársfield's El Nacional.

The establishment of a free trade agreement by the Confederation between the Port of Rosario (its chief port) and the Port of Montevideo proved detrimental to Buenos Aires trade. Worsening relations thus led to the re-election of the more intransigent Valentín Alsina as Governor at the end of 1858, and in February 1859, Alsina enacted retaliatory tariffs against Confederate goods. Tensions culminated in the Battle of Cepeda (1859) and the Battle of Pavón (1861), leading to significant concessions from the Confederation toward Buenos Aires, and to their reunification in December 1861.

Obligado served in the Buenos Aires Legislature following the end of his tenure as governor, fought in the Battles of Cepeda and Pavón, and served in Bartolomé Mitre's cabinet as Minister of War following the 1862 election of the Buenos Aires leader as President of Argentina. Obligado served concurrently in the Argentine Chamber of Deputies, to which he was elected in 1862.

He died in Córdoba Province in 1870, at age 51, and was interred at La Recoleta Cemetery.
