= Revolution of 11 September 1852 =

State of Buenos Aires declares independence

Coordinates: 34°36′30″S 58°22′19″W

- Part of Argentine Civil Wars
Date	11 September 1852
Location	Buenos Aires
Result	Province of Buenos Aires separates from Argentine Confederation and declares independent State

Belligerents
The Military forces of Buenos Aires	Confederation forces

Commanders and leaders
Justo José de Urquiza; José Miguel Galán	Benjamín Virasoro; Manuel Urdinarrain
- A bloodless coup d'etat
- Location within Argentina

The Revolution of 11 September 1852 was a conflict between the Province of Buenos Aires and the government of Justo José de Urquiza after the latter triumphed over Juan Manuel de Rosas at the Battle of Caseros.

A period known as "National Organization" was initiated after the Battle of Caseros. Every political faction agreed on authorizing a national Constitution. However, in opposition to the rest of the country, the ruling upper class in Buenos Aires aspired to impose political requirements on the Argentine provinces, so as to maintain the traditional political and economic preeminence of the capital city.

The result was a ten-year separation between the Argentine Confederation and the State of Buenos Aires. Both states claimed to be part of a single nation. But in reality, they behaved like separate states.

== Background ==
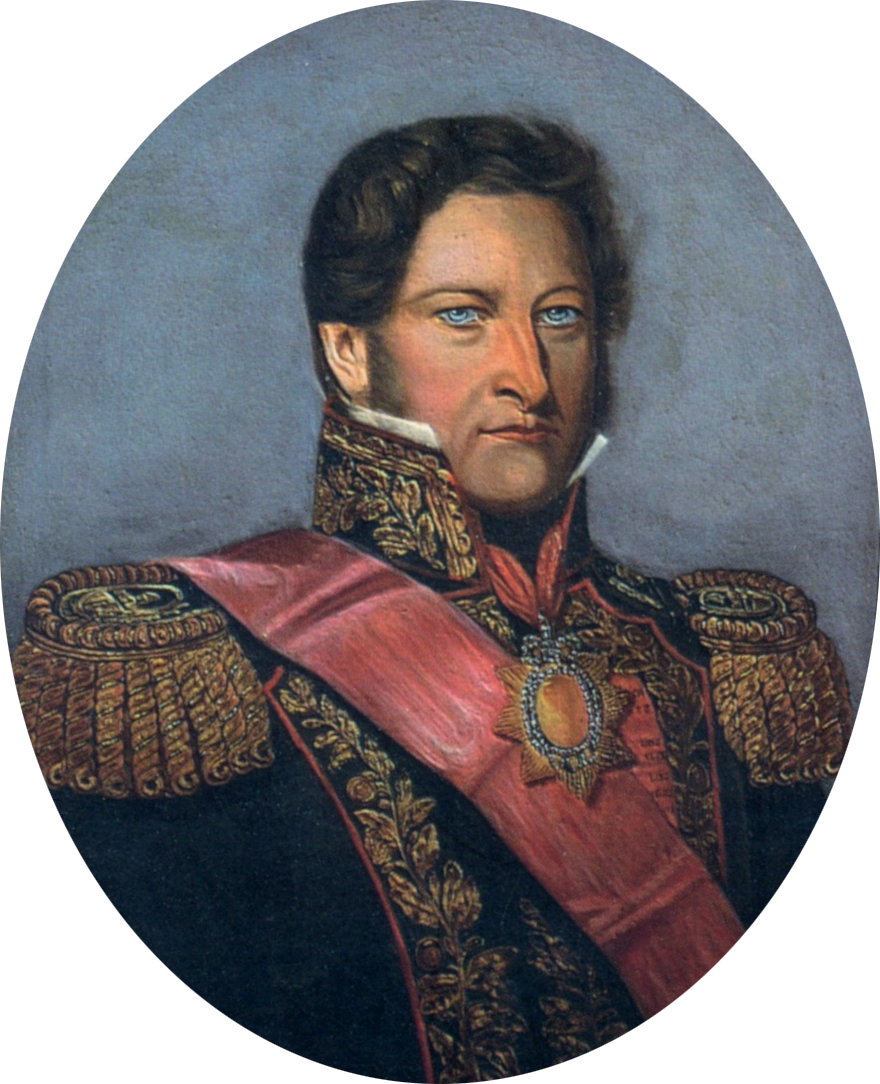
Juan Manuel de Rosas, former Governor of Buenos Aires Province

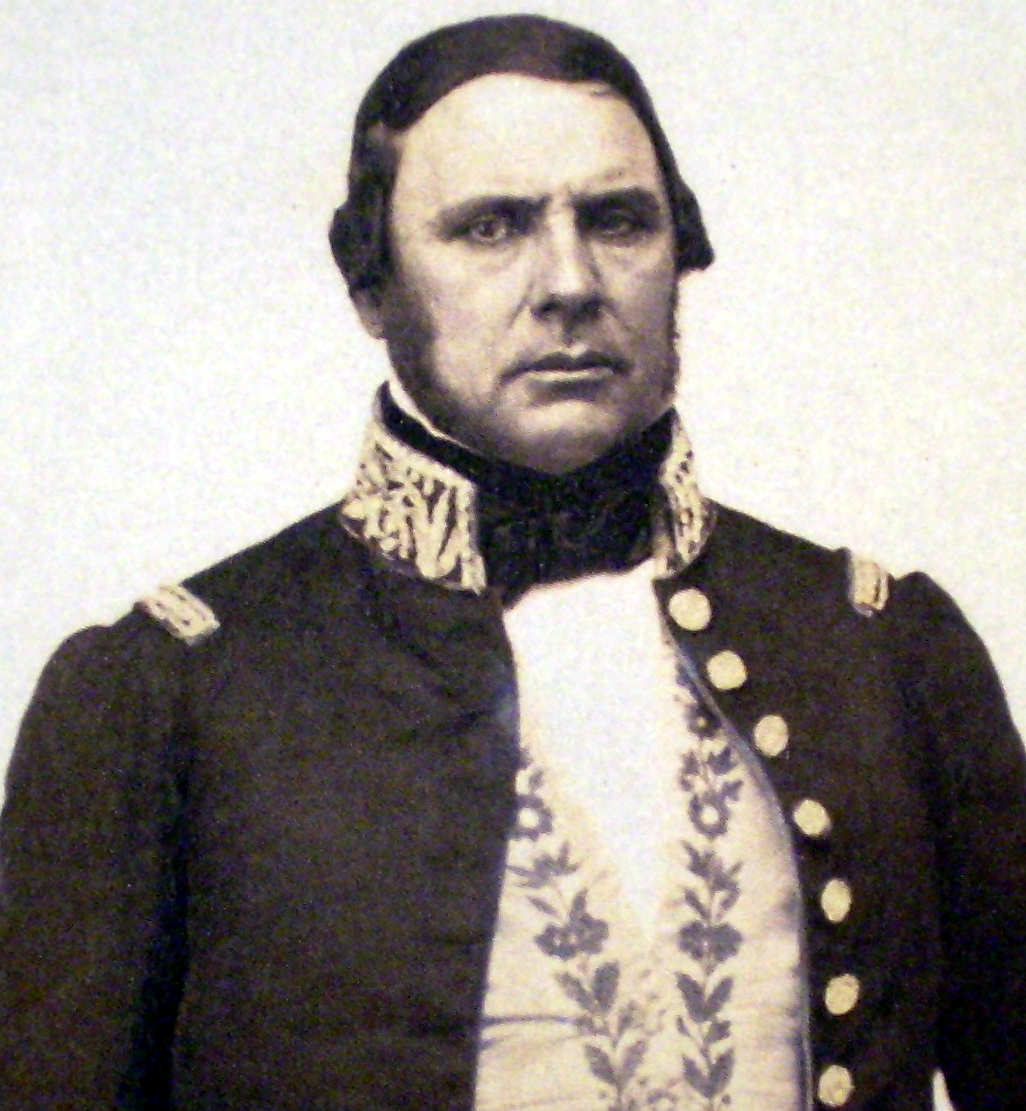
Justo José de Urquiza, governor of Entre Rios during the government of Juan Manuel de Rosas

After the 1819 and 1826 constitutions failed, rejected by the interior provinces due to their Unitarian Party tendencies, the Federal Party (federales) rose to power in every provincial government. Such a victory came at the cost of three decades of civil war in Argentina. Despite the absolute defeat of Unitarian factions and the death or exile of their main figures, the provinces were not able to impose a constitutional organization federally. Their chief obstacle was the province of Buenos Aires, even though all of its administrations had been federales since 1827.

During the lengthy dictatorship of Juan Manuel de Rosas, from 1835, he delayed authorization of a National Constitution until the interior provinces were at peace and well organized. This had the effect of granting numerous advantages of Buenos Aires province over the interior provinces; in particular, granting economic dominance by way of a monopoly on customs, and allowing Buenos Aires to act as the sole representative for all Argentina in foreign relations.

An alliance of sectors of the two traditional parties, the Unitarians and some Federales from the interior, and the Empire of Brazil built the Ejército Grande (Grand Army), commanded by Justo José de Urquiza, governor of the Entre Ríos, which launched an attack on Rosas and defeated him in the Battle of Caseros. All the victorious factions agreed that the next step was to establish national institutions through a Constitution. However, shortly thereafter it became evident that the Unitarians, many of whose leaders had spent years in exile and had returned in the months following the battle, aspired to maintain the hegemony of Buenos Aires.

During the first days after the Battle of Caseros, Urquiza's preeminence was accepted by everyone. He named Vicente López y Planes as deputy Governor on the 4 February. For a few weeks, an alliance of Unitarians and Federales was in charge of the provincial government, symbolized by the participation in office of Unitarian leader Valentín Alsina.

On the 11th of April, Urquiza called for elections for the House of Representatives of Buenos Aires, from which the Unitarian parties emerged victorious. Nonetheless, López y Planes was elected Governor on 1 May. This election caused the resignation of Alsina and Manuel Escalada, Minister of War.

== San Nicolás Agreement ==
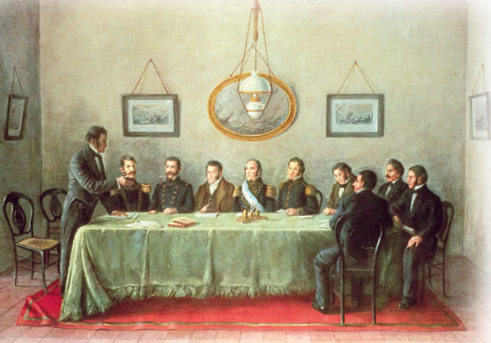
Pact signed 31 May 1852 at San Nicolás de los Arroyos

An agreement known as the Palermo Protocol, signed 6 April (in Rosas' house) by the governors of the four coastal states, endowed Urquiza with full powers nationally, and over foreign relations. It also called for an extraordinary meeting of all provincial governors in San Nicolás de los Arroyos. Some days later, a meeting of Urquiza's followers discussed a draft agreement to be presented before the governors by Juan Pujol. In the House of Representatives, Liberals tried to discuss certain conditions to be imposed on the meeting. Ignoring that, governor López set out for San Nicolás without obtaining the authorization of the House.

Nearly all provincial governors attended the meeting in San Nicolás. On the 31 May, they signed the San Nicolás Agreement, which called for a Constituent Congress to be formed made up of two delegates from each province, with the goal of authorizing a Constitution. Among other arrangements, it was established that Representatives would attend with full power to vote their conscience, without restraint on their liberty of action, although the provinces would be able to withdraw the delegates and replace them, if necessary. The provisions for "full powers" had been used many times before by Porteño governments to pressure provincial delegates into accepting measures in opposition to the instructions given them by the provinces. The essential difference was that this time, the Congressional meeting would not take place in Buenos Aires, but in Santa Fe. This way, pressure wouldn't be applied by the Porteño government, but by the Provisional Director of the Argentine Confederation: general Urquiza himself, who paid the wages of the delegates and had put the Governor of Santa Fe in office.

Moreover, Urquiza was bestowed with the title of Provisional Director of the Argentine Confederation, so that he could establish a national government with full executive and legislative powers.

== The events of June ==
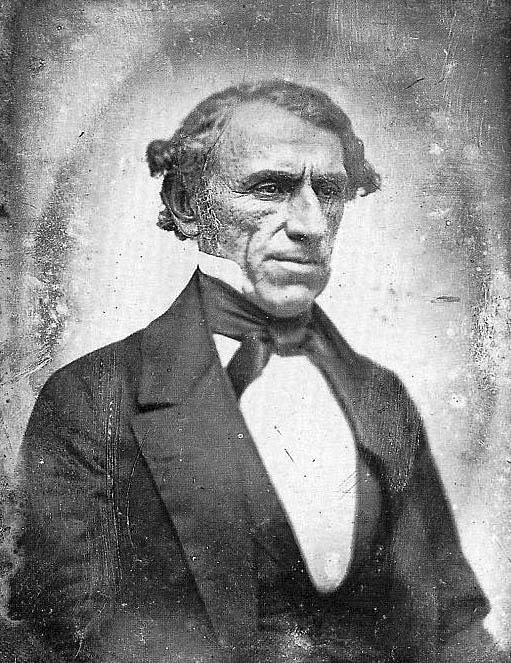
Dalmacio Vélez Sársfield, Argentine lawyer and politician, c.1850

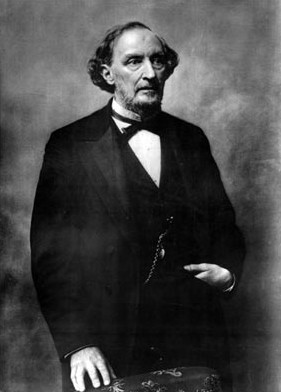
Bartolomé Mitre, President of Argentina (1862-1868)

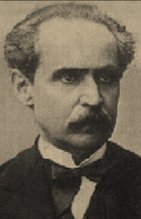
Vicente Fidel López, historian, lawyer and politician, and son of politician Vicente López y Planes.

In Buenos Aires, news about the signing of the San Nicolás Agreement provoked a reaction among the most zealous Unitarian factions. By the time governor López y Planes arrived in Buenos Aires on the 12 July accompanied by General Urquiza, the press had already shaped public opinion against the agreement. Foreshadowing what would eventually occur, an article in El Nacional ended with a striking claim from a discourse by Dalmacio Vélez Sarsfield:

It's impossible to govern a people whose rights are violated. One day, they will free themselves. Day and night, it will be an immense power, threatening the existing power, and it will end up defeating that power, because the people are always victorious in the end.

In the House of Representatives, Colonel Bartolomé Mitre gave a series of speeches rejecting the agreement, with the argument that the Governor had not been authorized by the House to sign an agreement, and that powers bestowed to the Provisional Director were dictatorial. (Note: Years later, Mitre was rightly accused of assuming even wider powers in the period following the dissolution of the Confederation following the 1861 Battle of Pavón and his assumption of the Presidency several months later. See Ruiz Moreno, Isidoro J. (2005). El misterio de Pavón [The Mystery of Pavón] (in Spanish). Buenos Aires: Claridad. ISBN 950-620-172-2. OCLC 948386138..)

The agreement had no defenders in the House, except for Representative Francisco Pico and ministers Juan María Gutiérrez and Vicente Fidel López—son of the Governor. He rejected the alleged right of porteños (Note: Porteños: Here, people from Buenos Aires.) to impose their requirements to the rest of the country, with a famous phrase:

I love the people of Buenos Aires, where I was born, as much as or more than anybody else does. But I raise my voice to say, my country is the Republic of Argentina, and not Buenos Aires!

— Vicente Fidel López

The public, incensed against the government, hampered López from continuing his speech. The next day, assured that the agreement would be rejected, every minister resigned. A few hours later, the governor handed in his resignation as well, which was accepted immediately. The president of the legislature, the aging General Manuel Pinto, was appointed provisional Governor.

Urquiza, who was in the outskirts of Buenos Aires, reacted immediately and with energy: on the 24th of June, Pinto received a note, which read:

I consider things to be in a complete state of anarchy, and in this conviction I find myself completely authorized to fulfill my primary duty, which is to save the homeland from demagogy, after having saved it from tyranny.

Urquiza also announced that the House was officially dissolved and that he was personally assuming executive powers. He also shut down various opposition periodicals, and expelled some of the top leaders from the territory, including Alsina, Mitre and Domingo Faustino Sarmiento. While he officially reinstated López in the government, López did not fully assume his powers.

== Runup to revolution ==
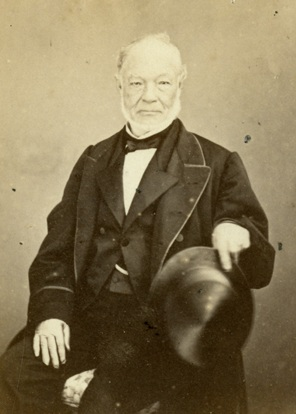
Lawyer and politician Salvador María del Carril, c. 1864

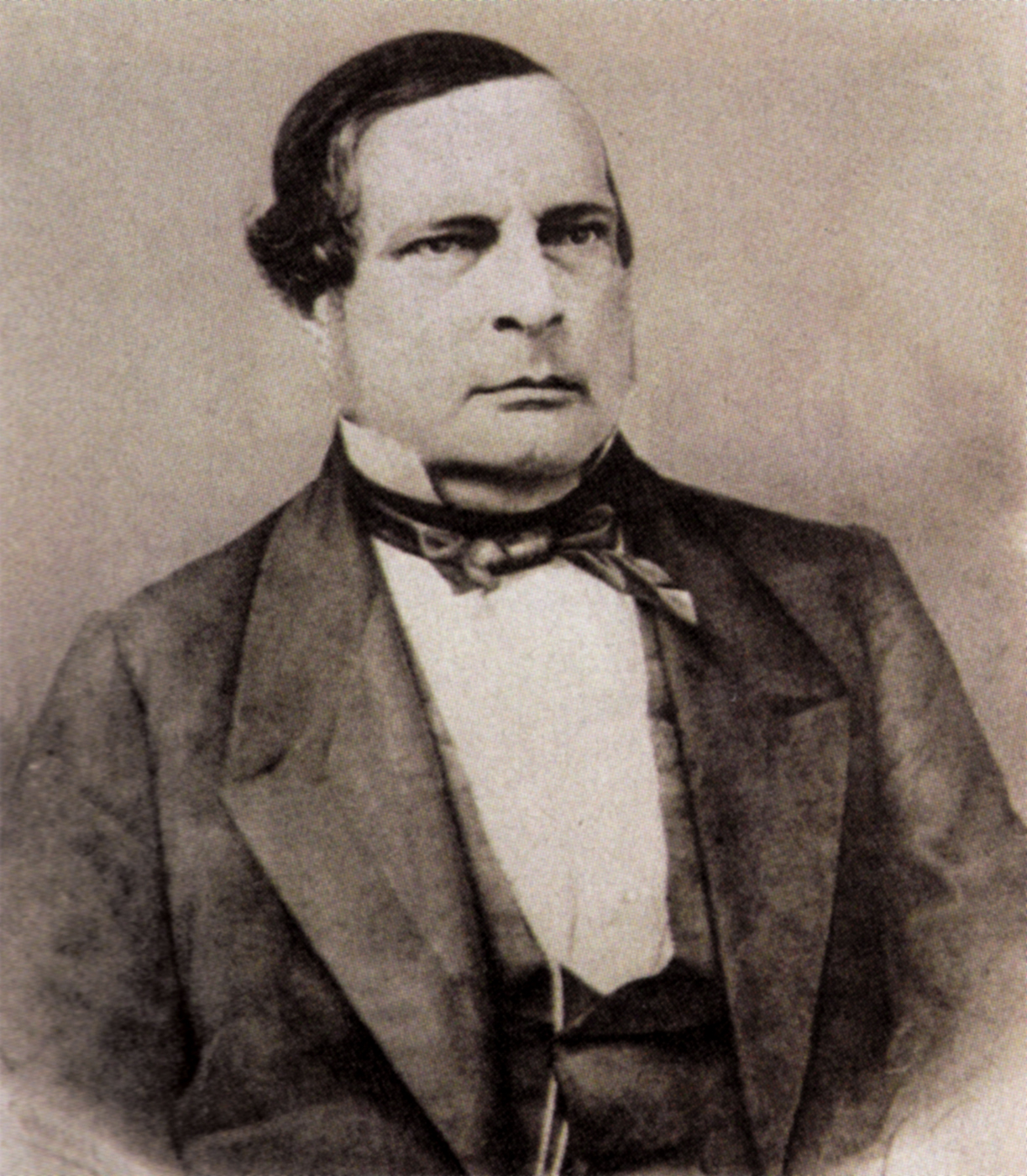
Santiago Derqui, c. 1860; President of Argentina, 1860–61.

López approved the agreement on behalf of the province and called for elections, in which two delegates, Salvador María del Carril and Eduardo Lahitte, were elected to the Congress in Santa Fe in a low-turnout election.

On 26 July, Vicente López—disagreeing with Urquiza's order to return seized property to Rosas—definitely renounced any further governing positions. (Note: This was the end of López's political career, and he never exercised any political or judicial role again.) Urquiza appointed himself Governor, foreshadowing what the Constitution would later name "federal intervention".

During his term as governor of Entre Rios Province, Urquiza sent doctor Santiago Derqui to Paraguay, to sign treaties of open navigation and to acknowledge the sovereignty of the country, which had been rejected previously by Rosas in 1843. Simultaneously, he announced the open navigation of interior rivers, an old grievance of the coastal provinces, which the liberal Porteños had signed on to in opposition to Rosas, for ideological reasons. But this measure brought him the hatred of old Rosas supporters, because they viewed it as the province losing its old privileges, and drew them closer to the positions of the liberals.

A tense calm held during the two months following Urquiza's coup: some of those who were exiled returned, while the city grudgingly accepted the intervention and military occupation. In public, there were no aggressive moves towards the general, and his birthday was even celebrated in Club del Progreso, but opposing parties went forward with revolutionary plans, which Urquiza confidently disregarded.

At the beginning of September, Urquiza, in a gesture of preference for his own province, handed over political power to José Miguel Galán, leader of the forces of Entre Ríos and Corrientes provinces in the city. This displeased generals Juan Madariaga and José María Pirán, leaders of the Corrientes troops. On 8 September, Urquiza went to Santa Fe, to open the Constituent Congress sessions.

== Revolution ==
In the early morning of the 11th of September, most of the military forces of the city plus Galan's Correntinas troops were gathered in Plaza de Mayo, led by general José María Pirán, while Miguel Esteves Saguí, lawyer, alerted the populace by sounding the bell of the Cabildo. Various militia formations went through the city, and generals Benjamín Virasoro and Manuel Urdinarrain were arrested in their homes. There were no major acts of violence, and although the situation was tense, it proceeded peacefully.

Near noon, while the troops were being given several months advance pay plus a bonus, the House of Representatives, which had been dismissed by Urquiza, reconvened, and elected General Pinto as interim governor. He named Alsina as Minister of Government and General Pirán as Minister of War.

General Galán, leadinga few military forces from Entre Ríos, withdrew first to Santos Lugares, and then toward the north of the province, from where he called Urquiza, who was getting ready to preside over the first of the Constituent Congress sessions.

A few days later, a provincial law passed granting financial rewards and rank promotions to the military involved in the revolution.

== September to December ==
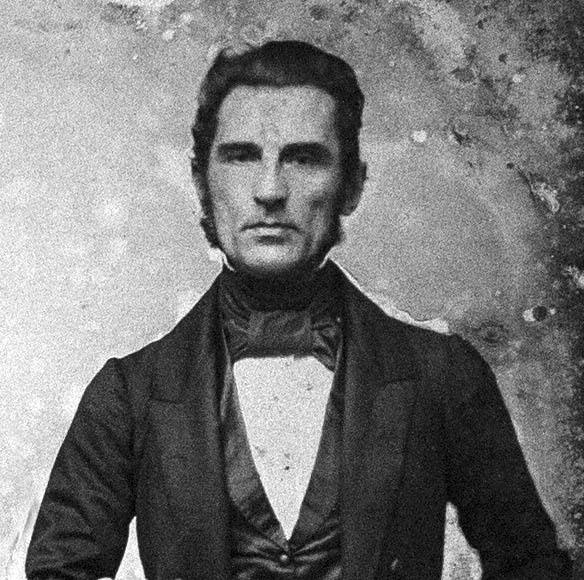
Governor of Buenos Aires Province, November 1852

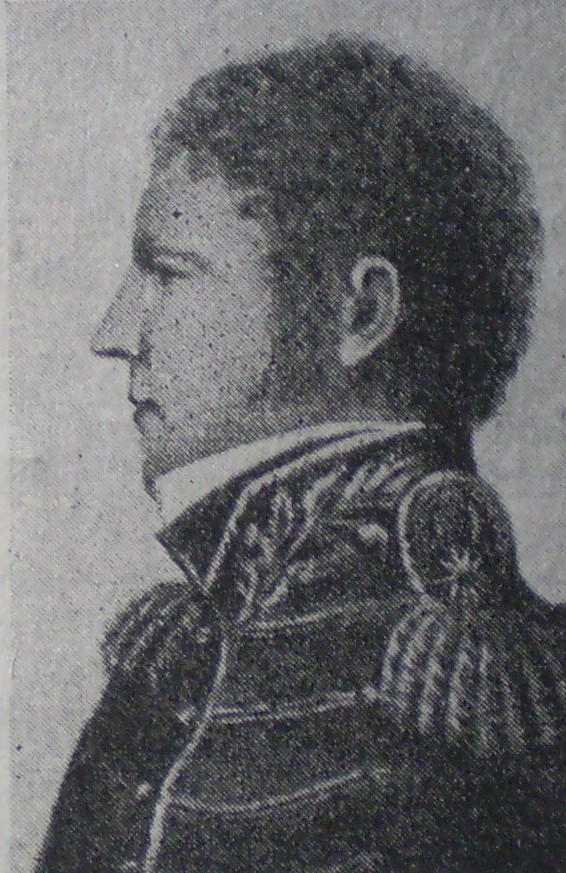
Manuel Pinto, Twice provisional governor of Buenos Aires Province.

Aware of the situation in Buenos Aires, but assuming Galán was in Santos Lugares, Urquiza counter-marched up to San Nicolás, at the front of a small army from the province of Santa Fe. Upon arriving at that city, he learned of Galán's retreat and the campaign chiefs' support of the revolution; that is to say that Colonels Hilario Lagos and Jerónimo Costa, who had been stationed in the Capital, as well as the commanders of the north campaign, José María Flores; the central campaign, Ramón Bustos; and the southern campaign, Juan Francisco Olmos, had spoken in favor of the new governor. In consequence of this, Urquiza ended his march, announcing he regretted the events, however given that the people were in agreement with the coup, he did not intend to impose his will over the will of the people of Buenos Aires. Years later, in a letter, he would explain he had judged

that revolution as a movement of one circle, of one faction. When, coming closer, I perceived that the people of Buenos Ayres accepted the movement and made it theirs, I suspended the march and declared that I would leave the people of Buenos Ayres free in the exercising of their rights and in the pursuit of methods to connect with the nation in a way that its legitimate representatives would find convenient.

Meanwhile, in Buenos Aires, during a meeting in the Teatro Coliseo, Alsina embraced publicly with the chief of Porteños Federals, Lorenzo Torres, who had been an ardent Rosas follower. It was the beginning of the reorganization of political parties, which would allow politicians who had followed Rosas to be reincorporated into the political scene. Also, many military leaders were reinstated in the Porteño army, in a process that had begun many months before.

That same day, Governor Pinto officially separated Buenos Aires province (which from then on would be known as the State of Buenos Aires) from the Argentine Confederation. The House of Representatives demanded their Representatives to the Constituent Congress return to Buenos Aires.

On the 24th of September, on learning that Urquiza had left for Entre Ríos, the government demanded the immediate exit from the province of several people, among them Colonels Bustos y Lagos.

A few days after the revolution, the government of Buenos Aires sent an official communication to the rest of the provinces announcing their intentions of expanding the movement to the rest of the country. Although it didn't claim that they would do it in a military way, it did say that they would be willing to defend it "with a sword in hand".

In the beginning of October, General José María Paz, leading figure of the Unitarian party, was sent on a peace mission to the inner provinces, starting with Cordoba, to explain their position to local governments, but he was frustrated in his attempt when the Governor of Santa Fe would not allow him to pass through his province. He remained as commander of the northern part of Buenos Aires province, with headquarters in San Nicolás.

At the end of the same month, the House of Representatives elected Valentín Alsina as Governor.

In mid-November, with the excuse of carrying Correntinos soldiers back to their provinces, a double expedition under the charge of Generals Manuel Hornos and Juan Madariaga invaded the province of Entre Ríos. Simultaneously, Alsina ordered general Paz to prepare to invade Santa Fe; but the old general refused to move. Lacking external support and attacked by the troops that Urquiza could mobilize effortlessly, the invasion to Entre Ríos failed completely because the predicted advances on Santa Fe had not occurred. The remains of the invading army fled in disorder to Corrientes, on whose support the Porteños had counted. Their Governor Pujol received their troops, disarmed their leaders, and expelled them from his province. From then on, Pujol was a loyal ally of Urquiza and the Porteños would only claim a few interior governments that weren't in position to lend support. Hence the inner stability of the Confederation was safe, although they were lacking the reintegration of Buenos Aires.

On 20 November, after the reading of a speech written by Urquiza, who was absent, the Constituent Congress started its sessions, without the assistance of Porteños Representatives.

== Counterrevolution and siege of Buenos Aires ==
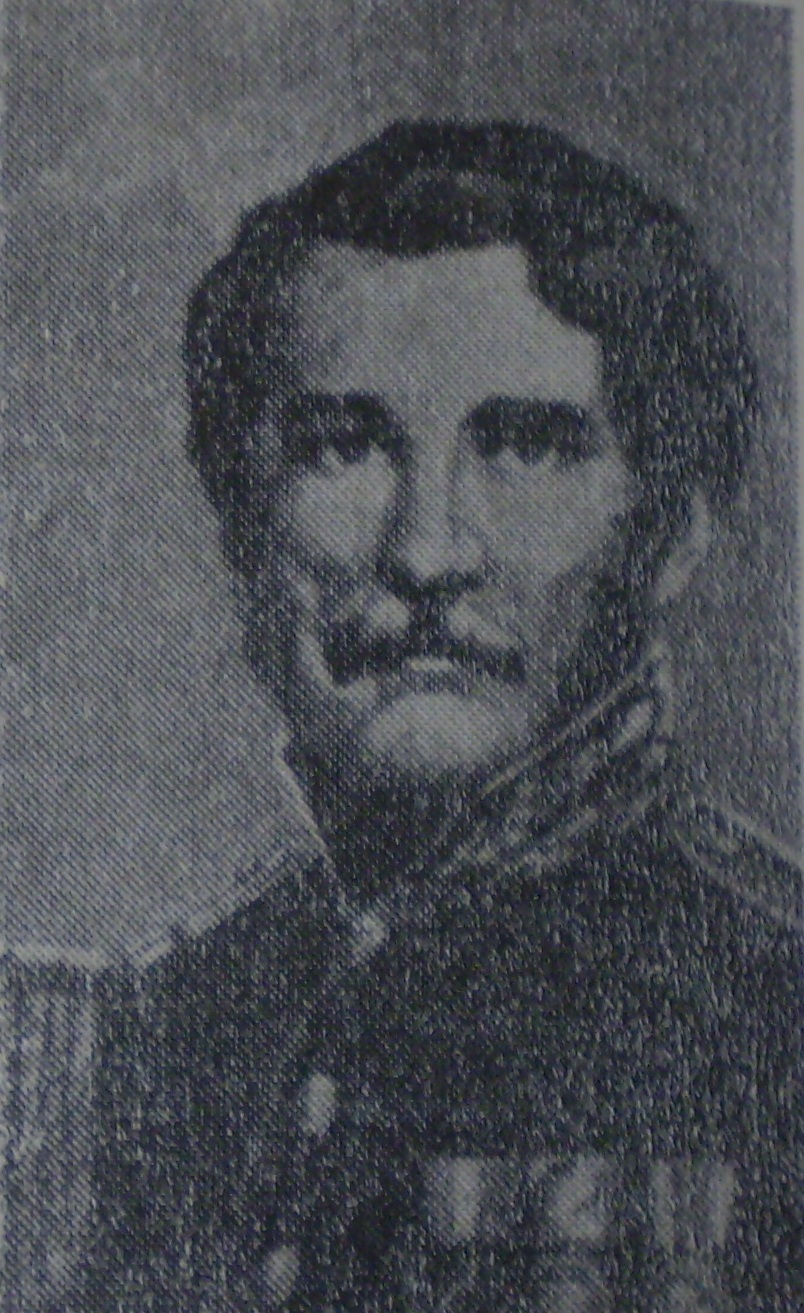
Federales Col. Hilario Lagos fought with the Confederation against the new State.

On December 1, Colonel Hilario Lagos appeared in front of the campaign troops and spoke against Alsina's government in Guardia de Luján (now Mercedes). A large part of the other campaign commanders, such as Costa, Bustos, and Flores, spoke in favor of Lagos, basically demanding the reincorporation of Buenos Aires to the Confederation, as well as Alsina's resignation and replacement by General Flores.

On December 6, Alsina presented his resignation and was replaced by general Pinto. The same day, Lagos' troops attacked the city, but the quick reaction of many determined leaders, specially Mitre, stopped them from seizing the Capital. Two days later, Lagos officially laid siege to the City of Buenos Aires.

Many leaders who had collaborated in Alsina's downfall, like Lorenzo Torres, refused to accept the authority of Flores' or Lagos', much less an agreement with Urquiza and, forgetting their internal conflicts, collaborated on defending the city. At the end of December, Torres himself took over the Ministry of Government.

Three weeks later, Urquiza sent troops to support Lagos, thus reinforcing the siege. However, they were unsuccessful at breaking through the Porteña infantry lines with his almost exclusively cavalry troops. Meanwhile, the government in Buenos Aires sent a prestigious campaign leader, Pedro Rosas y Belgrano, to gather the troops that remained loyal to the city in the interior of the province. Belgrano's troops were completely defeated in the Battle of San Gregorio, on January 22, in part because Urquiza's squadrons had also blocked Buenos Aires city from the Río de la Plata side, a few days before the battle.

During some months, the city of Buenos Aires remained blocked and under siege, but its financial superiority kept it safe from the sieger's attacks. A treaty signed on March 9 between the government of Buenos Aires and the Constituent Congress set the conditions of peace between the State of Buenos Aires and the Confederation. However, both Urquiza and Lagos considered the conditions to be unfavorable to the Confederation given that it left the income from customs in the hands of Buenos Aires and allowed its province to elect up to 10 representatives, conceding the advantage to Buenos Aires in precisely the two matters that were most disputed between it and the rest of the provinces. The treaty was ultimately rejected, and Urquiza reinforced his military support to the siege, personally participating in it himself.

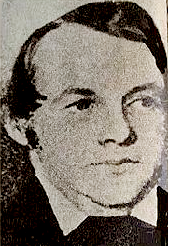
John Halstead Coe, officer of Argentina and commander of the Confederation fleet

On May 1, Congress adopted the National Constitution, which in the following months was approved by every Argentine province, including Buenos Aires. That is to say that the official news of the constitution was not sent to the city of Buenos Aires, but to the military and political commander of the interior, General Lagos, who convened a hastily elected legislature, which officially sanctioned the National Constitution while the government of the city completely rejected it.

At the end of April, General Urquiza took advantage of the venality of Porteños naval commanders to buy their defection from the Buenos Aires cause, and completely block the port of Buenos Aires. However Urquiza's strategy backfired as on June 20, the commander of the Confederate fleet John Halstead Coe sold out for a huge amount of money to the Porteños and handed them almost all the fleet.

The failure of the blockade had an enormous demoralizing effect on the sieging troops. A few days later, general Flores, who had abandoned the siege, returned from the north of the province with a huge sum of money, with which he bought a large part of Lagos' troops. On July 12, Urquiza abandoned the siege of Buenos Aires, followed by General Lagos himself and part of his troops.

== Aftermath of the Siege ==
From then on, the State of Buenos Aires, which adopted a constitution in 1854, remained separate from the rest of the country. Its leaders vacillated between making official the national independence of the State and the presumption that they represented the whole nation.

The Argentine Confederation elected as their first president Urquiza who governed until 1860 with a certain amount political stability, whiling facing serious economic problems, and relinquishing many governmental functions to the provincial governments.

The exiled leaders tried repeatedly to invade Buenos Aires, but failed every time; until General Jerónimo Costa was defeated and executed without trial, together with his officers, at the beginning of 1856.

After that a relative peace reigned between Buenos Aires and the Confederation. The Porteños took advantage of this peaceful state to increase their influence on the inner provinces, taking advantage of their undeniable commercial and financial superiority.

The Battle of Cepeda, in 1859, forced Buenos Aires to accept the National Constitution, but this wasn't the final solution, because instability in the government of Urquiza's successor, Santiago Derqui, and the advances of Buenos Aires allies in several inner provinces provoked a new confrontation, in the Battle of Pavón. The victory of the Porteños in this battle caused the dissolution of the Confederate government, and the temporary rise to national power of the Buenos Aires Governor Bartolomé Mitre. During this provisional government, Mitre's forces invaded more than half of the inner provinces, and replaced their federalist governments by unitarian ones.

When Mitre took over the presidency of the whole country, in October 1862, he finally achieved the goals that he and the rest of the leaders of the Revolution of September 11th had set: constitutional organization of the country under the preeminence of the rulers, the political and economical ideas, and the interests of the Province of Buenos Aires.

== See also ==
- Argentine Civil War
- Buenos Aires Cabildo
- José María Flores
- Juan María Gutiérrez
- Platine War
- Santa Fe Province

== Works cited ==
- Adelman, Jeremy (2 July 2002). Republic of Capital: Buenos Aires and the Legal Transformation of the Atlantic World. Redwood City, Calif.: Stanford University Press. ISBN 978-0-8047-6414-8. OCLC 1041053757.
- Beruti, Juan Manuel [in Spanish] (2001). Memorias curiosas [Curious Memories] (in Spanish). Buenos Aires: Emecé.
- Bosch, Beatriz [in Spanish] (1984). Urquiza y su tiempo [Urquiza and His Times] (in Spanish). Buenos Aires: Centro Editor de América Latina.
- Carranza, Neptalí (1905). Oratoria Argentina. Recopilación cronológica de las proclamas ... y documentos importantes que llegaron á la historia de su patria, Argentinos célebres, desde el año 1810 hasta 1904 (in Spanish). Vol. II. La Plata, Buenos Aires: Sesé y Larrañaga. p. 53. OCLC 559267076.
- Busaniche, José Luis [in Spanish] (2005). Historia argentina [Argentine History] (in Spanish). Buenos Aires: Taurus. ISBN 987-04-0078-7.
- Buenos Aires (Argentina : Province). Legislatura (1883). "Sesio'n del 22 de junio de 1852". Diario de sesiones de la Sala de Representantes de la Provincia de Buenos Aires, 1852 (in Spanish). Buenos Aires: Imprenta Especial de Obras de "La Republica". OCLC 192094539.
- Labougle, Juan Eugenio (1856). Ensayo sobre la literatura de los principales pueblos y especialmente del Rio de la Plata. Buenos Ayres: J.A. Bernheim. p. 122. OCLC 561264588. "Un pueblo violentado no es posible gobernarlo: mañana se emancipará. Será, a toda hora, un poder inmenso que esté amenazando el poder existente. Lo vencerá al fin, porque los pueblos siempre vencen."
- Lahourcade, Alicia. "San Gregorio, una batalla olvidada" [San Gregorio, A Forgotten Battle]. Revista Todo es Historia (in Spanish) (126).
- Paz, Gustavo L. (2007). Las guerras civiles (1820-1870) [The Civil Wars (1820–1870)] (in Spanish). Buenos Aires: EUDEBA. ISBN 978-950-23-1596-6.
- Ruiz Moreno, Isidoro J. (2006). Campañas militares argentinas [Argentine Military Campaigns volume II] (in Spanish). Buenos Aires: Emecé. ISBN 950-04-2794-X.
- Sáenz Quesada, María [in Spanish] (1984). La República dividida [Divided Republic]. Memorial de la Patria (in Spanish). Vol. X. Buenos Aires: La Bastilla.
- Scobie, James (1965). La lucha por la Consolidación de la Nacionalidad Argentina [The Struggle for the Consolidation of Argentine Nationality] (in Spanish). Buenos Aires: Hachette.
- Shumway, Nicolas (18 March 1993). The Invention of Argentina. History. Latin American Studies. Berkeley, California: University of California Press. p. 173. ISBN 978-0-520-08284-7. OCLC 875478257.
- Zinny, Antonio [in Spanish] (1987). Historia de los gobernadores de las Provincias Argentinas [History of Provincial Governors of Argentina] (in Spanish). Hyspamérica. ISBN 950-614-685-3.
