= State of Buenos Aires =

1852–1861 secessionist Argentine province

State of Buenos Aires Estado de Buenos Aires
- 1852–1861
- Flag Coat of arms
- Anthem: Himno Nacional Argentino "Argentine National Anthem"
- Capital: Buenos Aires
- Common languages: Spanish
- Religion: Catholicism
- Government: Unitary republic
- Governor
  - 1852: Manuel Pinto
  - 1852: Valentín Alsina
  - 1852–1853: Manuel Pinto
  - 1853–1858: Pastor Obligado
  - 1858–1859: Valentín Alsina
  - 1859–1860: Felipe Llavallol
  - 1860–1862: Bartolomé Mitre (Note: Bartolomé Mitre continued to serve as governor of the Buenos Aires Province after the reunification of Argentina.)
- History
  - Secession: 11 September 1852
  - Constitution: 12 April 1854
  - 1st Argentine rail line: 30 August 1857
  - Battle of Cepeda: 23 October 1859
  - Battle of Pavón: 17 September 1861
  - Reunification: 12 December 1861

Population
  - 1855 census: 248,498
- Currency: Peso moneda corriente
Preceded by	Succeeded by
Argentine Confederation	Argentine Republic

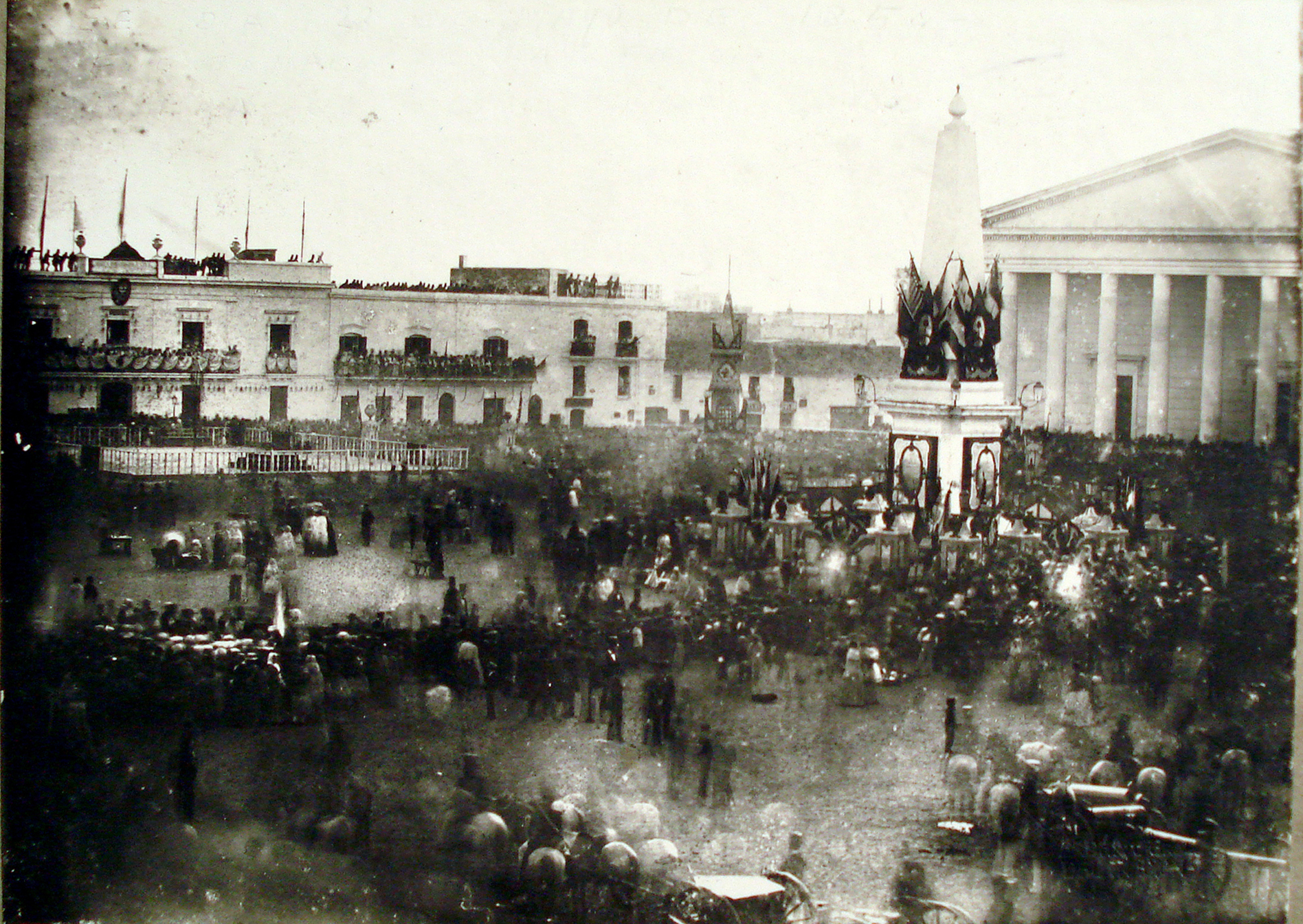
Delegates swear allegiance to the 1854 Constitution of Buenos Aires.

The State of Buenos Aires (Spanish: Estado de Buenos Aires) was a secessionist republic resulting from the overthrow of the Argentine Confederation government in the Province of Buenos Aires on 11 September 1852. The State of Buenos Aires was never explicitly recognized by the Confederation; it remained, however, independent under its own government and constitution. Buenos Aires rejoined the Argentine Confederation after the former's victory at the Battle of Pavón in 1861.

== Background ==
Regionalism had long marked the relationship among the numerous provinces of what today is Argentina, and the wars of independence did not result in national unity. Following a series of disorders and a short-lived Constitutional Republic led by Buenos Aires centralist Bernardino Rivadavia in 1826 and 1827, the Province of Buenos Aires would function as a semi-independent state amid an internecine civil war.

An understanding was entered into by Buenos Aires Governor Juan Manuel de Rosas and other Federalist leaders out of need and a shared enmity toward the still vigorous Unitarian Party. The latter's 1830 establishment of the Unitarian League from nine western and northern provinces would force Buenos Aires, Corrientes and Entre Ríos Provinces into the Federal Pact of 1831 and enabled the overthrow of the Unitarian League.

The granting of the sum of public power to Rosas in 1835 established a dynamic whereby leaders (caudillos) from the hinterland provinces would delegate certain powers, such as foreign debt payment or the management of international relations to the Buenos Aires leader. The Argentine Confederation thus functioned, albeit amid ongoing conflicts, until the 1852 Battle of Caseros, when Rosas was deposed and exiled.

== Establishment ==
The central figure in the overthrow of Rosas, Entre Ríos Governor Justo José de Urquiza, was granted the power of a head of state by the Palermo Protocols of 6 April 1852. This provoked resistance in Buenos Aires, however, which then refused to ratify the San Nicolás Agreement of 31 May. The prospect of having the Argentine Congress headquartered in Santa Fe proved especially objectionable, and Urquiza's 12 June appointment of former President Vicente López y Planes failed to turn public opinion in Buenos Aires. Colonel Bartolomé Mitre rallied the Assembly against the San Nicolás Accords. The most contentious issue remained the Buenos Aires Customs, which remained under the control of the city government and was the chief source of public revenue. Nations with which the Confederation maintained foreign relations, moreover, kept all embassies in Buenos Aires (rather than in the capital, Paraná).

Governor López y Planes ultimately resigned on 26 July, prompting Urquiza to seize the governor's post through a Federal intervention decree. His departure to Santa Fe on 8 September for the inaugural session of Congress prompted the 11 September coup d'état against the provisional administration of Governor José Miguel Galán. Led in its military aspect by General José María Pirán and ideologically by Dr. Valentín Alsina and Colonel Mitre, the 11 September revolt created the foremost threat to both the Confederation and Urquiza: Alsina ordered General Juan Madariaga to invade Santa Fe within days of the coup (though without success).

Naming the aging Manuel Guillermo Pinto as governor, Alsina secured the allegiance of the deposed Governor Galán, as well as of a number of key Federalist figures such as former top Rosas advisor Lorenzo Torres. Alsina, who was elected governor by the Legislature on 31 October, alienated Colonel Hilario Lagos, however. Lagos persuaded War Minister José María Floresto to leave Buenos Aires and, on 1 December, initiated the Siege of Buenos Aires. Alsina resigned and Pinto, who served as president of the Legislature, again took office as governor. The siege continued through June 1853, and Urquiza commissioned a naval flotilla to blockade Buenos Aires (whose chief source of revenue was duty collected at the port). The commander of the flotilla, U.S.-born Admiral Jonas Halstead Coe, was bribed with 5,000 troy ounces of gold, however, on 20 June, and following his relinquishment of the flotilla to Buenos Aires, Urquiza called off the siege on 12 July.

== Constitution ==
The Constitution of the State of Buenos Aires was sanctioned on 11 April 1854 and promulgated on the 12th. Links to the text of the document, interspersed with critical notes by Juan Bautista Alberdi, appear in this note and as external links to this article.

The constitution itself described the polity as the Estado de Buenos Aires (State of Buenos Aires). It comprised 178 Articles, and was divided into eight parts.

=== Sovereignty ===
Article 1 said "Buenos Aires is a State that, until it delegates its sovereignty to a federal government and does so expressly, freely exercises its sovereignty internally and with respect to the outside world" (Buenos Aires es un Estado con el libre ejercicio de su soberanía interior y esterior, miéntras no la delegue expresamente en un gobierno federal).

Despite this, Article 6 stated that its citizens included, not only those born in its territory, but "the sons of the other provinces that comprise the Republic". Alberdi said that, by this article, the document acknowledged the existence of an Argentine republic comprising Buenos Aires province and the others.

=== Territory ===
The territory of the State of Buenos Aires was defined very vaguely in Article 2, but it claimed to extend to the foothills of the Andes and included Martín García Island.

Unlike the 1853 Constitution of the Argentine Confederation, it did not specify that its rivers were open to navigation by the shipping of all nations, an omission that Alberdi severely criticised.

== Recognition ==
=== By foreign governments ===
Earlier versions of this article stated that the State of Buenos Aires was not recognised by foreign governments but this is inaccurate.

The United States had already recognised the rival Argentine Confederation, with its upriver capital in the town of Paraná, Entre Ríos, and signed treaties for the free navigation of the Paraná and Uruguay Rivers. This was bitterly protested by the State of Buenos Aires. It asked what right had the Confederation to deprive it of its power of blockade of the rivers (a long-standing bone of contention between Buenos Aires and the littoral provinces.) It complicated the position of the United States, whose commercial relations with Buenos Aires were always much more important. The U.S. representative found himself in the anomalous position of being accredited to one government and having to do business with the other. There was vacillation. Then in 1854 the State Department accredited James A. Peden of Florida as minister resident to Buenos Aires: an American diplomat of such seniority had not been sent to the Río de la Plata since 1823. Peden was accepted by Buenos Aires, where he negotiated a treaty of friendship, commerce and navigation with the State. Not until 18 July 1856 did the American government inform Peden that he was being transferred to the Confederation.

In 1855 the Paraguayan government of Carlos Antonio López, annoyed that the Congress of the Argentine Confederation had refused to ratify the 1852 Treaty of Limits (by which the Argentine Confederation would have got the territory of Misiones, but Paraguay would have got the Chaco north of the Bermejo River), established relations with the State of Buenos Aires and appointed a Paraguayan consul.

Also in 1855 the Brazilian government sent a Chargé d'affaires, as did the Kingdom of Sardinia (predecessor state of the Kingdom of Italy), and Portugal. Consuls were sent and accredited by the Republic of Uruguay and the Free City of Hamburg; later, by France, Bolivia, Sweden and Norway, and Denmark.

=== By the Argentine Confederation ===
The proposition that the State of Buenos Aires was not recognised by the Argentine Confederation requires qualification. For example, on 8 January 1855 both parties signed a convention dealing with such matters as military cooperation against Indian raids, the extradition of fugitive criminals, that the ships of both polities must fly the Argentine flag, and customs and postal co-operation.

== Functioning ==
Jurist Pastor Obligado was elected governor by the Legislature on 28 June 1853. He obtained passage of the Constitution of Buenos Aires on 12 April 1854, and initiated an ambitious public works program, installing the first gas lamps and running water system in the city, and establishing what later became the Colegio Nacional de Buenos Aires, as well as a network of public primary schools for the largely illiterate population at the time. The 1854 constitution, drafted by Dalmacio Vélez Sársfield, asserted the sovereignty of Buenos Aires, including its right to engage in its own diplomatic relations, as well as a bicameral legislature and freedom of worship.

Obligado reformed the practice of emphyteusis, whereupon land could then be sold at a regulated rate of 16,000 silver pesos (pesos fuerte, nearly at par with the U.S. dollar) per square league (4,428 acres). He established a national mint under the auspices of the Bank of the Province of Buenos Aires, and subsidies for industry and commerce; on 30 August 1857, the recently established Buenos Aires Western Railway inaugurated its first line, designed by British engineer William Bragge. A census conducted on 17 October 1855, found a population of 248,498 for the State of Buenos Aires, of which 71,438 lived in the capital.

== Bibliography ==
- Abad de Santillán, Diego. Historia Argentina (in Spanish). Buenos Aires: TEA (Tipográfica Editora Argentina).
- Historical Dictionary of Argentina. London: Scarecrow Press, 1978.
- "El Convenio de Unión o Pacto de San José de Flores (noviembre de 1859)" (in Spanish). Universidad del CEMA.
