= Felipe Llavallol =

Argentine merchant, philanthropist and lawmaker

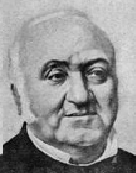

Governor of the State of Buenos Aires
- In office October 23, 1859 – May 3, 1860
- Preceded by: Valentín Alsina
- Succeeded by: Bartolomé Mitre

Personal details
- Born: December 26, 1802 Buenos Aires, Viceroyalty of the Río de la Plata
- Died: April 4, 1874 (aged 71) Buenos Aires, Argentina
- Party: Unitarian Party
- Spouse: Martina Monasterio
- Occupation: Merchant

Felipe Esteban Llavallol (December 26, 1802 – April 4, 1874) was an Argentine merchant, philanthropist, lawmaker and briefly Governor of the secessionist State of Buenos Aires.

== Life and times ==
Llavallol was born in Buenos Aires to María Gertrudis de Merlo and Jaime Llavallol; the elder Llavallol was a Catalan merchant from Barcelona who had emigrated to Buenos Aires in the 1790s, and Felipe Llavallol joined his father in business. He married the former Martina Monasterio in 1833, and they had seven children. He inherited his father's commercial establishment in 1838 and became one of Buenos Aires' leading businesspeople.

Following the September 11, 1852, declaration of the secessionist State of Buenos Aires, Llavallol held numerous posts in the new government. He was elected to the Lower House of Congress, becoming President of the Chamber, and to the Senate in 1854, serving as its president until 1856. He was appointed Economy Minister and took part in the establishment of the Buenos Aires Stock Exchange in 1854, and served as its first president until August 1855. Named President of the newly established Buenos Aires Western Railway, he presided over the August 30, 1857, inaugural of its first line, designed by British engineer William Bragge.

Elected Vice-Governor in Valentín Alsina's ticket in December 1858, the defeat of Buenos Aires forces by those of the Argentine Confederation at the Battle of Cepeda (1859) led to Confederate President Justo José de Urquiza's demand that Alsina resign, and the more pragmatic Llavallol succeeded Alsina as governor on October 23, 1859.

Governor Llavallol's brief tenure as governor was highlighted by the resulting negotiations, which produced the Pact of San José de Flores and significant concessions toward Buenos Aires. He stepped down on May 3, 1860, upon the legislature's election of Colonel Bartolomé Mitre, who defeated Confederate forces at the 1861 Battle of Pavón and reincorporated Buenos Aires into a unified Argentina.

Llavallol continued his work as a member of the Comisión Filantrópica charity organization, and died in Buenos Aires in 1874, at age 71. He was interred in La Recoleta Cemetery.
