= Battle of Cepeda =

Battle of Cepeda may refer to:

- Battle of Cepeda (1820), first major battle between Federals and Unitarians in Argentina
- Battle of Cepeda (1859), in which Argentine Federals defeated the Unitarians
