= Governor of Buenos Aires Province =

Head of government of Buenos Aires Province

- Gobernador de la provincia de Buenos Aires
- Coat of arms of the Buenos Aires Province

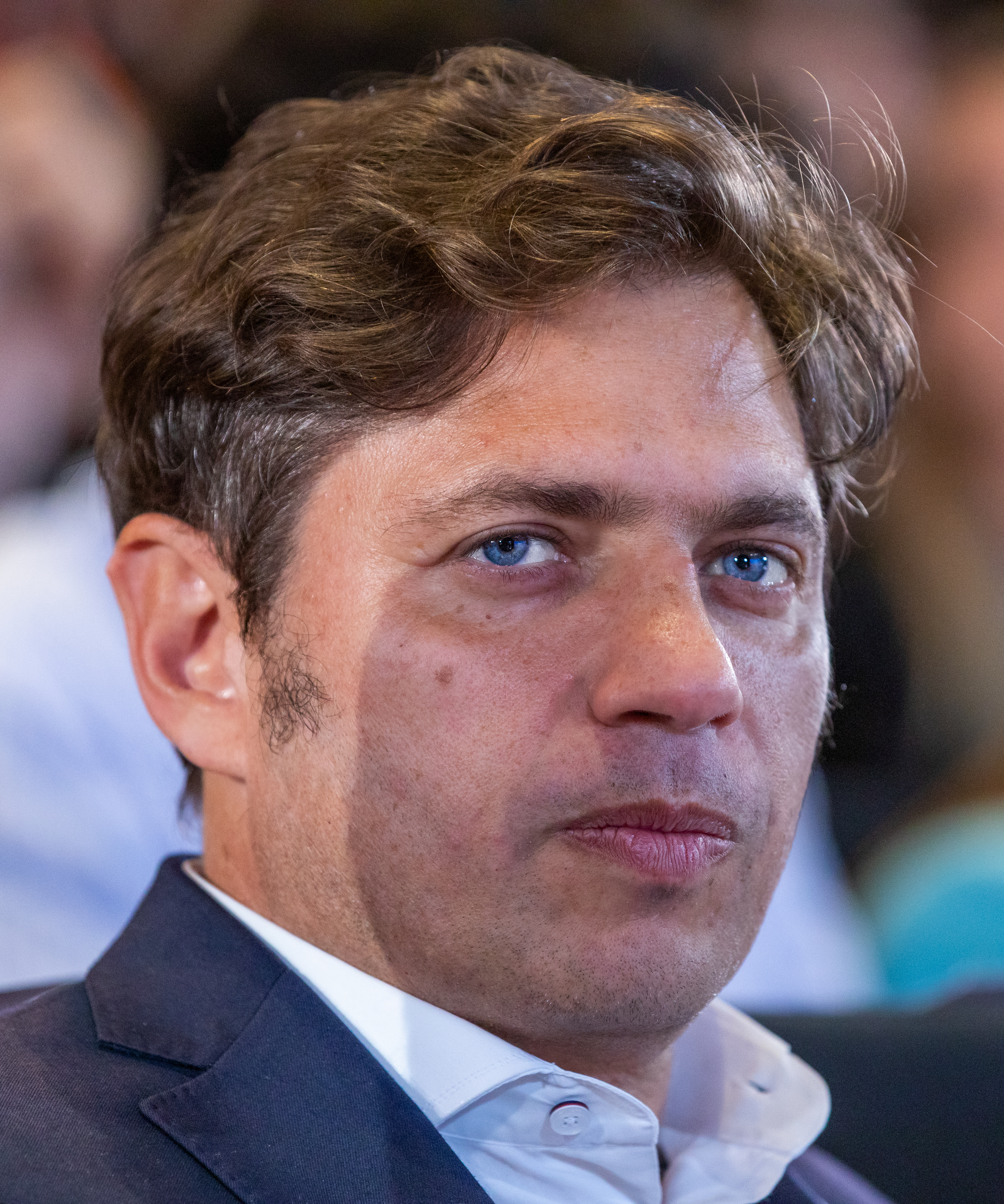
- Incumbent; Axel Kicillof since December 11, 2019
- Style: Señor/a Gobernador/a
- Residence: Residencia del Gobernador, La Plata
- Appointer: Direct popular vote
- Term length: 4 years
- Inaugural holder: Miguel de Azcuénaga
- Formation: 1812
- Deputy: Vice Governor
- Website: https://www.gba.gob.ar/

The Governor of Buenos Aires Province (Spanish: Gobernador de la Provincia de Buenos Aires) is a citizen of the Buenos Aires Province of Argentina, holding the office of governor for the corresponding period. The governor is elected alongside a vice-governor. Currently the governor of Buenos Aires Province is Axel Kicillof since December 11, 2019.

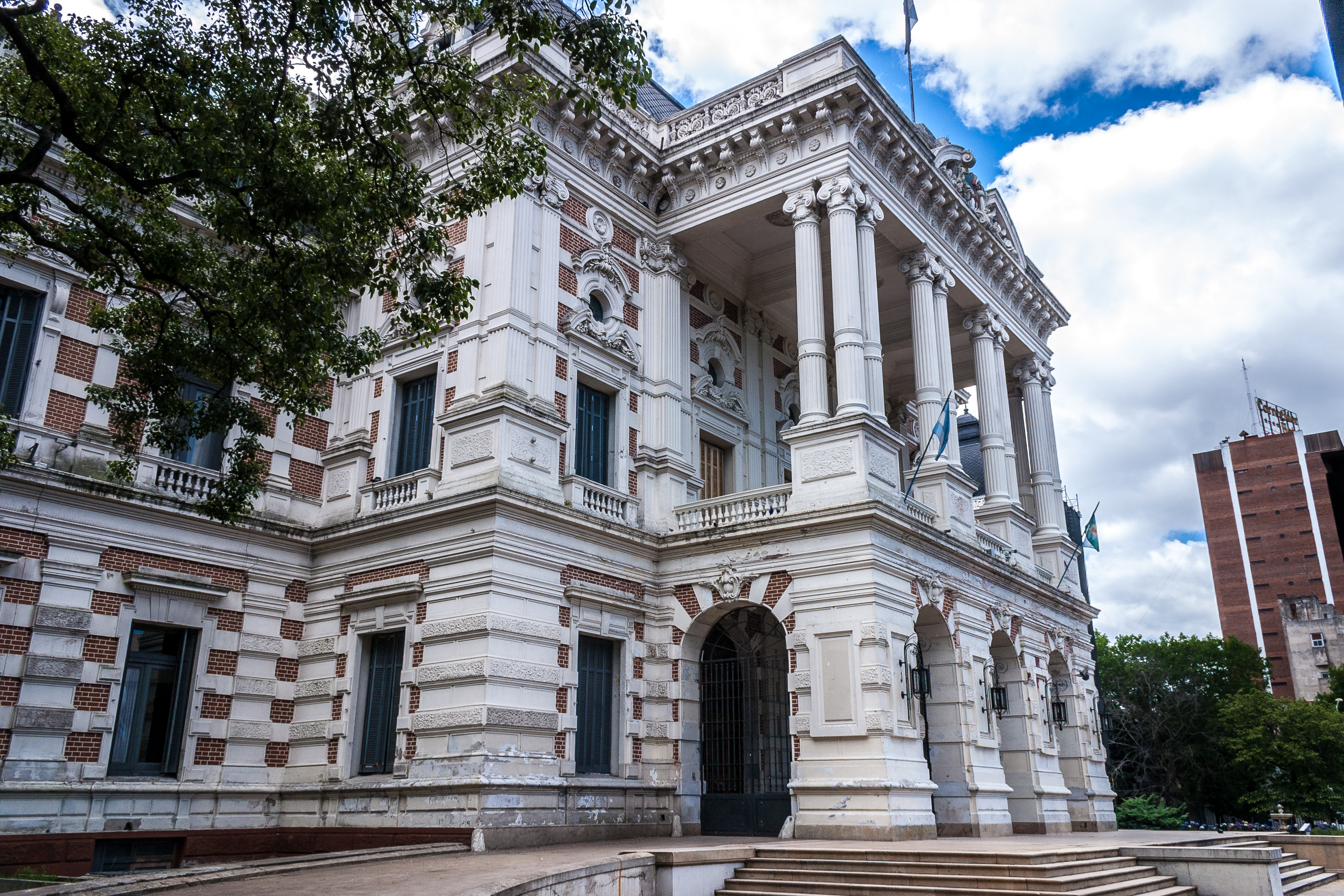
Casa de Gobierno de la Provincia de Buenos Aires

== Requirements ==
To be able to be elected governor, the person must be an Argentine citizen and must have been born in Argentina, or be the child of an Argentine citizen if born in a foreign country. The citizen must also be at least 30 years old, and have at least 5 uninterrupted years of residence in the province if not natural from it. The term lasts 4 years, with the chance of a single reelection.

== List of officeholders ==
=== Governor-intendant ===
Period	Governor
January 13, 1812 – February 10, 1813	Miguel de Azcuénaga (interim)
February 14, 1813 – April 16, 1815	Antonio González Balcarce
April 16, 1815 – May 19, 1815	Buenos Aires Cabildo (interim)
May 19, 1815 – June 8, 1818	Manuel Luis de Oliden
June 8, 1818 – Julio 30, 1818	José Rondeau
July 30, 1818 – November 12, 1818	Juan Ramón Balcarce
November 13, 1818 – March 16, 1819	Eustaquio Díaz Vélez (interim)
March 17, 1819 – February 9, 1820	Juan Ramón Balcarce
February 9, 1820 – February 11, 1820	Miguel de Irigoyen

=== United Provinces of the Río de la Plata and the Argentine Confederation ===
Governors managing international relations of the United Provinces of the Río de la Plata and the Argentine Confederation (de facto Heads of State).

Period	Governor	Portrait
February 11, 1820 – February 18, 1820	Miguel de Irigoyen (interim)	
February 18, 1820 – March 6, 1820	Manuel de Sarratea (interim)	
March 6, 1820 – March 11, 1820	Juan Ramón González Balcarce (interim)	
March 11, 1820 – May 2, 1820	Manuel de Sarratea	
May 2, 1820 – June 20, 1820	Ildefonso Ramos Mexía	
June 20, 1820 – June 23, 1820	Buenos Aires Cabildo (interim)	
June 23, 1820 – June 29, 1820	Miguel Estanislao Soler (interim)	
June 29, 1820 – September 20, 1820	Manuel Dorrego (interim)	
September 20, 1820 – April 2, 1824	Martín Rodríguez	
April 2, 1824 — March 7, 1826	Juan Gregorio de Las Heras	
March 7, 1826 — August 17, 1827	No provincial authorities during the short existence of an official presidency	
August 17, 1827 — December 1, 1828	Manuel Dorrego	
December 1, 1828 — June 26, 1829	Juan Galo Lavalle (de facto)	
June 26, 1829 — December 6, 1829	Juan José Viamonte (interim)	
December 6, 1829 — December 5, 1832	Juan Manuel de Rosas	
December 17, 1832 — November 4, 1833	Juan Ramón González Balcarce	
November 4, 1833 — June 27, 1834	Juan José Viamonte	
June 27, 1834 — March 7, 1835	Manuel Vicente Maza (interim)	
March 7, 1835 — February 3, 1852	Juan Manuel de Rosas	
February 3, 1852 — July 26, 1852	Vicente López y Planes (interim)	

=== Argentine Confederation ===
Governors without national power during the Argentine Confederation.

Period	Governor	Portrait
July 26, 1852 — September 4, 1852	Justo José de Urquiza (provisional, at the same time Head of State as Provisional Director)	
September 4, 1852 — September 11, 1852	José Miguel Galán (interim)	

=== State of Buenos Aires (independent from Argentina) ===
Period	Governor	Portrait
September 11, 1852 — October 31, 1852	Manuel Guillermo Pinto (interim)	
October 31, 1852 — December 7, 1852	Valentín Alsina	
December 7, 1852 — June 28, 1853	Manuel Guillermo Pinto (interim)	
June 28, 1853 — July 24, 1853	Junta de Representantes	
July 24, 1853 — May 27, 1854	Pastor Obligado (provisional)	
May 27, 1854 – December 21, 1858	Pastor Obligado (constitutional)	
December 21, 1858 – November 8, 1859	Valentín Alsina	
November 8, 1859 – May 3, 1860	Felipe Llavallol (interim)	
May 3, 1860 – December 12, 1861	Bartolomé Mitre	

=== List of provincial governors before the enactment of the Sáenz Peña Law (1862–1914) ===
Governor	Term in office	Party	Notes	Vice Governor
Vicente Cazón	11 October 1862 – 15 October 1862	Independent	Interim administration.	Vacant
Mariano Saavedra	15 October 1862 – 1 May 1866	Independent		Vacant
Adolfo Alsina	1 May 1866 – 10 October 1868	Autonomist		Vacant
Emilio Castro	10 October 1868 – 3 May 1872	Autonomist		Vacant
Mariano Acosta	3 May 1872 – 12 September 1874	Autonomist	Resigned office.	Vacant
Álvaro Barros	12 September 1874 – 1 May 1875	Independent	Interim administration.	Vacant
Carlos Casares	1 May 1875 – 1 May 1878	PAN		Luis Sáenz Peña
Carlos Tejedor	1 May 1878 – 1 July 1880	Independent	Resigned after the 1880 Uprising.	José María Moreno
José María Moreno	1 July 1880 – 18 July 1880	Independent	Assumed office upon Tejedor's resignation.	Vacant
José María Bustillo	18 July 1880 – 11 October 1880	Independent	Federal interventor appointed by Nicolás Avellaneda	Vacant
Juan José Romero	11 October 1880 – 1 May 1881	Independent	Federal interventor appointed by Nicolás Avellaneda	Vacant
Dardo Rocha	1 May 1881 – 1 May 1884	PAN		Adolfo Gonzales Chaves
Carlos Alfredo D'Amico	1 May 1884 – 1 May 1887	Independent		Matías Cardoso
Máximo Paz	1 May 1887 – 1 May 1890	PAN		Claudio Stegmann
Julio A. Costa	1 May 1890 – 8 August 1893	PAN		Víctor del Carril
Juan Carlos Belgrano	8 August 1893 – 18 August 1893	UCR	Governor during the 1893 Uprising.	Vacant
Eduardo Olivera	18 August 1893 – 21 September 1893	PAN	Federal interventor appointed by Luis Sáenz Peña	Vacant
Lucio Vicente López	21 September 1893 – 1 May 1894	PAN	Federal interventor appointed by Luis Sáenz Peña	Vacant
Guillermo Udaondo	1 May 1894 – 1 May 1898	UCN		José Inocencio Arias
Bernardo de Irigoyen	1 May 1898 – 1 May 1902	UCR		Alfredo Demarchi
Marcelino Ugarte	1 May 1902 – 1 May 1906	PAN		Adolfo Saldías
Ignacio Darío Irigoyen	1 May 1906 – 1 May 1910	PAN		Ezequiel de la Serna
José Inocencio Arias	1 May 1910 – 12 September 1912	Independent		Faustino de Lezica
Ezequiel de la Serna	12 September 1912 – 15 March 1913	PAN	Assumed office upon Arias's death.	Vacant
Eduardo Arana	15 March 1913 – 2 July 1913	PAN	Provincial Senate president. Assumed office upon de la Serna's death.	Vacant
Juan Manuel Ortiz de Rosas	2 July 1913 – 1 September 1913	PAN		Luis García
Luis García	1 September 1913 – 1 May 1914	PAN	Assumed office upon Ortiz de Rosas's death.	Vacant

=== List of governors since the enactment of the Sáenz Peña Law (1914–present) ===
Governor	Term in office	Party	Election	Vice Governor
Marcelino Ugarte	1 May 1914 – 25 April 1917	PAN	1913	Vicente Peralta Alvear
José Luis Cantilo	25 April 1917 – 1 May 1918	UCR	Federal interventor appointed by Hipólito Yrigoyen	Vacant
José Camilo Crotto	1 May 1918 – 20 May 1921	UCR	1918	Luis Monteverde
Luis Monteverde	20 May 1921 – 1 May 1922	UCR	1918	Vacant
José Luis Cantilo	1 May 1922 – 1 May 1926	UCR	1922	Pedro Solanet
Valentin Vergara	1 May 1926 – 1 May 1930	UCR	1925	Victoriano de Ortúzar
Nereo Crovetto	1 May 1930 – 11 September 1930	UCR	1929	Juan Garralda
Carlos Meyer Pellegrini (de facto)	11 September 1930 – 31 December 1930	—N/a	De facto federal interventor	Vacant
Clodomiro Zavalía (de facto)	31 December 1930 – 19 January 1931	—N/a	De facto federal interventor	Vacant
Carlos Meyer Pellegrini (de facto)	19 January 1931 – 4 May 1931	—N/a	De facto federal interventor	Vacant
Mariano Vedia (de facto)	4 May 1931 – 12 May 1931	—N/a	De facto federal interventor	Vacant
Manuel Ramón Alvarado (de facto)	12 May 1931 – 2 October 1931	—N/a	De facto federal interventor	Vacant
Raymundo Meabe (de facto)	2 October 1931 – 18 February 1932	PLC	De facto federal interventor	Vacant
Honorio Pueyrredón	Never took office	UCR	April; 1931	Mario Guido
Federico Martínez de Hoz	15 March 1935 – 20 January 1936	PDN	November; 1931	Raúl Díaz
Raúl Díaz	15 March 1935 – 20 January 1936	PDN	November; 1931	Vacant
Edgardo J. Míguez	20 January 1936 – 18 February 1936	PDN	—	Vacant
Raúl Díaz	18 February 1936 – 7 March 1940	PDN	—	Vacant
Manuel Fresco	18 February 1936 – 7 March 1940	PDN	1935	Aurelio Amodeo
Alberto Barceló	Never took office	PDN	1940	Edgardo J. Míguez
Luis Cassinelli	7 March 1940 – 13 March 1940	—N/a	National commissioner appointed by Ramón Castillo	Vacant
Octavio R. Amadeo	13 March 1940 – 27 May 1940	—N/a	Federal interventor appointed by Ramón Castillo	Vacant
Carlos Herrera	27 May 1940 – 4 June 1940	—N/a	Federal interventor appointed by Ramón Castillo	Vacant
Octavio R. Amadeo	4 June 1940 – 1 February 1941	—N/a	Federal interventor appointed by Ramón Castillo	Vacant
Eduardo T. López	1 February 1941 – 10 February 1941	—N/a	Federal interventor appointed by Ramón Castillo	Vacant
Eleazar Videla	10 February 1941 – 1 September 1941	—N/a	National commissioner appointed by Ramón Castillo	Vacant
Enrique Rottjer	1 September 1941 – 13 September 1941	—N/a	Federal interventor appointed by Ramón Castillo	Vacant
Dimas González Gowland	13 September 1941 – 7 January 1942	—N/a	National commissioner appointed by Ramón Castillo	Vacant
Rodolfo Moreno	7 January 1942 – 12 June 1943	PDN	1941	Edgardo J. Míguez
Edgardo J. Míguez	13 April 1943 – 12 June 1943	PDN	1941	Vacant
Oscar Cazalas (de facto)	12 June 1943 – 17 June 1943	—N/a	De facto federal interventor	Vacant
Armando Verdaguer (de facto)	17 June 1943 – 22 December 1943	—N/a	De facto federal interventor	Vacant
Faustino J. Legón (de facto)	22 December 1943 – 5 January 1944	—N/a	De facto federal interventor	Vacant
Julio O. Ojea (de facto)	5 January 1944 – 5 May 1944	—N/a	De facto federal interventor	Vacant
Luis García Mata (de facto)	5 May 1944 – 19 July 1944	—N/a	De facto federal interventor	Vacant
Juan Carlos Sanguinetti (de facto)	19 July 1944 – 27 December 1944	—N/a	De facto federal interventor	Vacant
Roberto M. Vanetta (de facto)	27 December 1944 – 12 January 1945	—N/a	De facto federal interventor	Vacant
Juan Atilio Bramuglia (de facto)	12 January 1945 – 19 September 1945	—N/a	De facto federal interventor	Vacant
Ramón del Río (de facto)	19 September 1945 – 28 September 1945	—N/a	De facto federal interventor	Vacant
Alberto H. Reales (de facto)	28 September 1945 – 17 October 1945	—N/a	De facto federal interventor	Vacant
Francisco Sáenz Kelly (de facto)	17 October 1945 – 29 October 1945	—N/a	De facto federal interventor	Vacant
Ramón Albariño (de facto)	29 October 1945 – 22 January 1946	—N/a	De facto federal interventor	Vacant
Juan Enrique Coronas (de facto)	22 January 1946 – 24 January 1946	—N/a	De facto federal interventor	Vacant
Francisco Sáenz Kelly (de facto)	24 January 1946 – 16 May 1946	—N/a	De facto federal interventor	Vacant
Domingo Mercante	16 May 1946 – 4 June 1952	Labour	1946	Juan Bautista Machado
Domingo Mercante	16 May 1946 – 4 June 1952	Peronist	1950	José Luis Passerini
Carlos Aloé	4 June 1952 – 25 September 1955	Peronist	1951	Carlos Antonio Díaz
Arturo Ossorio Arana (de facto)	25 September 1955 – 10 November 1955	—N/a	De facto federal interventor	Vacant
Juan María Mathet (de facto)	10 November 1955 – 15 November 1956	—N/a	De facto federal interventor	Vacant
Emilio A. Bonnecarrére (de facto)	15 November 1956 – 2 May 1958	—N/a	De facto federal interventor	Vacant
Oscar Alende	2 May 1958 – 19 May 1962	UCRI	1958	Arturo Crosetti
Andrés Framini	Never took office	Popular Union	1962	Francisco Anglada
Guillermo Salas Martínez	20 March 1962 – 13 April 1962	—N/a	Federal interventor appointed by Arturo Frondizi	
Jorge Bermúdez Emparanza	20 March 1962 – 13 April 1962	UCR	Federal interventor appointed by Arturo Frondizi	
Roberto Etchepareborda (de facto)	13 April 1962 – 1 June 1962	—N/a	De facto national commissioner	
Ceferino Merbilhaa (de facto)	1 June 1962 – 24 October 1962	—N/a	De facto national commissioner	
Félix Trigo Viera (de facto)	24 October 1962 – 24 April 1963	—N/a	De facto national commissioner	
Francisco A. Imaz (de facto)	24 April 1963 – 12 October 1963	—N/a	De facto national commissioner	
Anselmo Marini	12 October 1963 – 28 June 1966	UCR	1963	Ricardo Lavalle
Jorge Von Stecher (de facto)	28 June 1966 – 5 July 1966	—N/a	De facto federal interventor	Vacant
Francisco A. Imaz (de facto)	5 July 1966 – 16 June 1969	—N/a	De facto federal interventor	Vacant
Saturnino Llorente (de facto)	16 June 1969 – 10 June 1970	—N/a	De facto federal interventor	Vacant
Horacio Rivara (de facto)	10 June 1970 – 8 September 1971	—N/a	De facto federal interventor	Vacant
Miguel Moragues (de facto)	8 September 1971 – 25 May 1973	—N/a	De facto federal interventor	Vacant
Oscar Bidegain	25 May 1973 – 24 January 1974	Justicialist	1973	Victorio Calabró
Victorio Calabró	24 January 1974 – 24 March 1976	Justicialist	1973	Vacant
Adolfo Sigwald (de facto)	24 March 1976 – 7 April 1976	—N/a	De facto federal interventor	Vacant
Ibérico Saint-Jean (de facto)	7 April 1976 – 29 March 1981	—N/a	De facto federal interventor	Vacant
Oscar Bartolomé Gallino (de facto)	29 March 1981 – 14 January 1982	—N/a	De facto federal interventor	Vacant
Jorge Aguado (de facto)	14 January 1982 – 10 December 1983	—N/a	De facto federal interventor	Vacant
Alejandro Armendáriz	10 December 1983 – 10 December 1987	UCR	1983	Elva Roulet
Antonio Cafiero	10 December 1987 – 10 December 1991	Justicialist (FR)	1987	Luis María Macaya
Eduardo Duhalde	10 December 1991 – 10 December 1999	Justicialist	1991	Rafael Romá
Eduardo Duhalde	10 December 1991 – 10 December 1999	Justicialist	1995	Rafael Romá
Carlos Ruckauf	10 December 1999 – 3 January 2002	Justicialist	1999	Felipe Solá
Felipe Solá	3 January 2002 – 10 December 2007	Justicialist	1999	Vacant
Felipe Solá	3 January 2002 – 10 December 2007	Justicialist	2003	Graciela Giannettasio
Daniel Scioli	10 December 2007 – 10 December 2015	Justicialist	2007	Alberto Balestrini
Daniel Scioli	10 December 2007 – 10 December 2015	Justicialist	2011	Gabriel Mariotto
María Eugenia Vidal	10 December 2015 – 11 December 2019	PRO (Cambiemos)	2015	Daniel Salvador
Axel Kicillof	11 December 2019 – Incumbent	Justicialist (FDT • UP)	2019	Verónica Magario
Axel Kicillof	11 December 2019 – Incumbent	Justicialist (FDT • UP)	2023	Verónica Magario

== See also ==
- Legislature of Buenos Aires Province
  - Buenos Aires Province Senate
  - Buenos Aires Province Chamber of Deputies
