= Ignazio Manzoni =

Italian painter

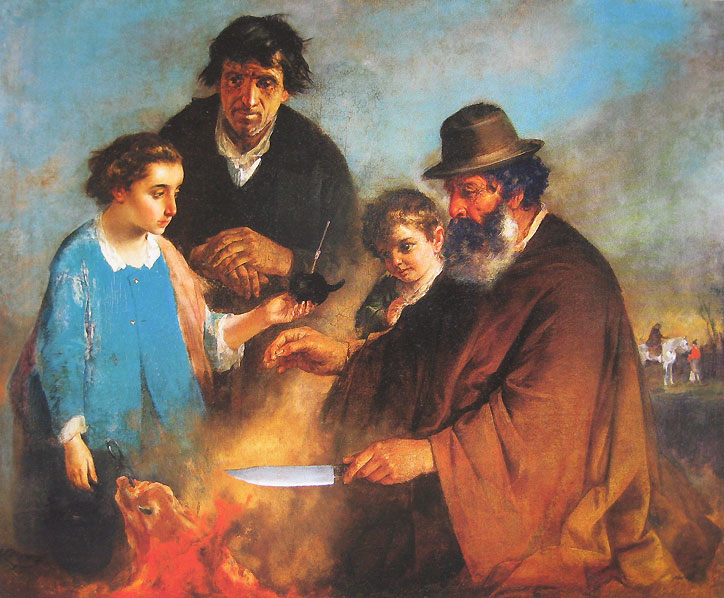
Gaucho teaching a foreigner his style of carving a roast pork (El Asado)

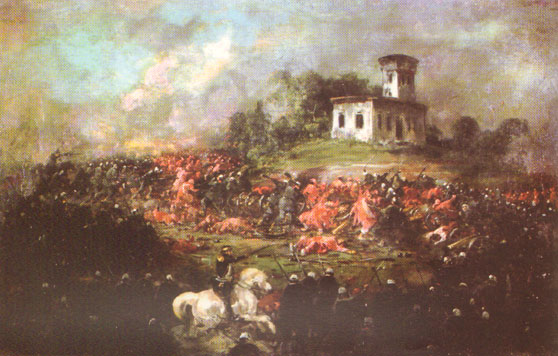
Battle of Pavón in 1861

Ignazio or Ignacio Manzoni (1797 – 18 November 1884) was an Italian painter, active for many years in Buenos Aires, Argentina. He painted diverse themes, including history, battle, religious, and landscape paintings, as well as still-lifes and portraits.

== Biography ==
He began his artistic studies at the Accademia de Brera, in his native Milan. He fought against the Austrians during the First Italian War of Independence and was forced into exile in Switzerland when the Italian forces were defeated. He remained there until an amnesty was declared.

He eventually left Italy again; apparently as the result of a love affair with an unidentified Duchess who was unable to separate from her husband. When he arrived in Argentina, in 1851, he immediately set up shop as a teacher. Even though his still-lifes were coldly received, he decided to remain there, although he also travelled to the United States, Peru and Chile. It wasn't until 1857 that he took up permanent residence in Buenos Aires, where he became popular for his portraits, religious works and costumbrista scenes.

In 1862, he entered into a rivalry with another Italian-born painter who was very popular in Buenos Aires: Baldassare Verazzi, who publicly challenged him in the press to present his credentials. A few days later, the newspaper, El Nacional came to the defense of Verazzi, declaring that Manzoni was a low-class painter, while Verazzi was the most accomplished artist who had yet come to Argentina. Some smaller art journals sided with Manzoni. The two became friends soon after.

His oil painting, El Asado (The Roast), won first prize at the Primera Exposición Nacional, held in Córdoba (1871), after it had been praised by President Domingo Faustino Sarmiento.

He died in Clusone during a visit to Italy in 1884.
