= Máximo Paz =

Argentine politician (1851–1931)

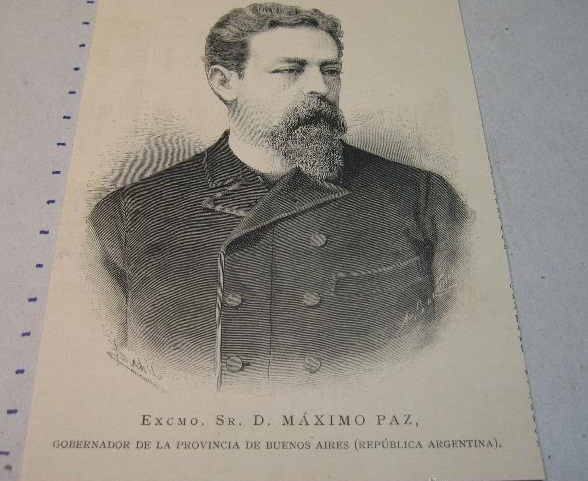

Governor of Buenos Aires Province
- In office 1887–1890
- Preceded by: Carlos Alfredo D'Amico
- Succeeded by: Julio A. Costa

Jefe de Policía of Buenos Aires Province
- In office 1880–1880.
- Preceded by: Domingo Viejobueno
- Succeeded by: Julio Dantas

Personal details
- Born: April 15, 1851 Buenos Aires, Argentina
- Died: November 7, 1931 (aged 80) Buenos Aires, Argentina
- Resting place: La Recoleta Cemetery
- Party: National Autonomist Party
- Occupation: politician landowner
- Profession: lawyer police
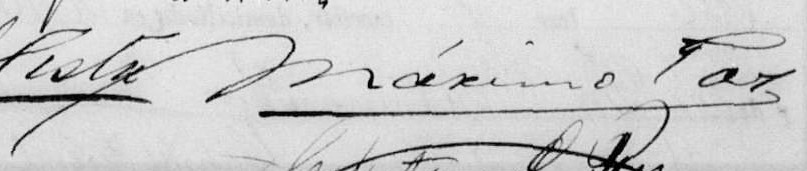
- Signature

Máximo Paz (April 15, 1851 – November 7, 1931) was an Argentine politician who served as Senator, Deputy and Governor of the Province of Buenos Aires.

He was born in Buenos Aires, the son of Marcos Paz and Micaela Cascallares, belonging to a family of Argentine politicians from Tucumán. He was married to Georgina Kent, a distinguished lady of English descent.
