= Manuel Luis de Oliden =

Bolivian politician and military man (1784–1869)

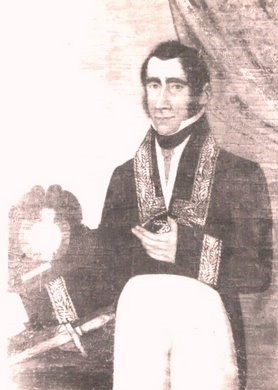
Manuel Luis de Oliden

Manuel Luis de Oliden (19 July 1784 – 15 November 1869) was a Bolivian politician and military figure.

He was born into a wealthy family in Buenos Aires and, after his marriage in 1806 to Mary Eustacia Amatler–the daughter of the Governor-Intendant of Potosí–moved to Upper Peru. He earned a Doctor of Law degree from the Royal University of Chuquisaca in 1808. As head of the urban militias of Chuquisaca, he supported the revolution of May 25, 1809, an insurrection against the governor mayor of the city of Charcas.
