= Battle of Pavón =

1861 battle of the Argentine Civil Wars

- Part of the Argentine Civil Wars
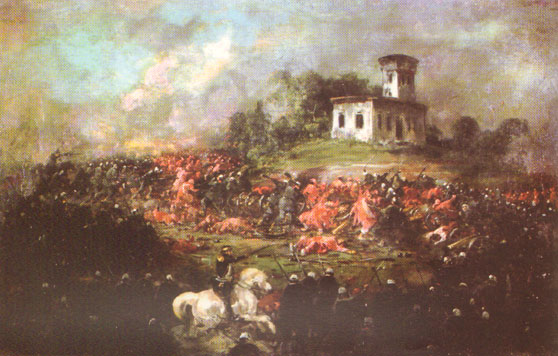
- Battle of Pavón by Ignacio Manzoni at Museo Mitre
Date	17 September 1861
Location	Between Rueda and Godoy, Santa Fe Province, Argentina 33°20′19.8″S 60°29′27.2″W
Result	Buenos Aires victory
Territorial changes	Reintegration of Buenos Aires into the Confederation

Belligerents
State of Buenos Aires	Argentine Confederation

Commanders and leaders
Bartolomé Mitre	Justo José de Urquiza

Strength
Total: 15,000 – 16,000; 9,000 infantry 6,000 horsemen 1,000 artillerymen 35 cannons	Total: 16,000 – 18,000; 5,000 infantry 11,000 horsemen 2,000 artillerymen 42 cannons

Casualties and losses
64 officers and 162 soldiers killed 500 wounded	1,200 – 1,300 dead and wounded 1,650 – 1,800 prisoners 32 – 37 guns, 11 flags, 3,000 rifles, 5,000 horses

The Battle of Pavón, a key battle of the Argentine Civil Wars, was fought in Pavón, Santa Fé Province, Argentina on 17 September 1861 between the Army of the State of Buenos Aires (commanded by Bartolomé Mitre) and the Army of Republic of the Argentine Confederation (commanded by Justo José de Urquiza). The withdrawal of Urquiza left the field to Mitre.

The victory led to the dissolution of the national government and the reincorporation of Buenos Aires Province into the Argentine Republic as a dominant member of the nation. Governor Bartolomé Mitre would act as interim president, ratified by the National Congress, and then as the first president of a unified Argentine Republic.

== Background ==
=== Political postures ===
During most of the 19th Century, Argentine history was defined by the theoretical, political and military confrontation between two postures:

- On one side, the province of Buenos Aires wanted to decentralize the nation, giving state autonomy to the provinces, aiming mainly to avoid the establishment of a federal government in his province because it would take most of its resources.
- On the other, the remaining provinces wanted to centralize the country around Buenos Aires, establishing the capital in that province.

One difference between the porteños from Buenos Aires and people from the provinces was that the former did not align directly with the two political parties of the time. Unitarians and Federalists existed both in the capital and in the provinces. Even though they were against each other politically, when it came to defending their own local interests, they joined to confront their common enemy (be it the capital or the provinces, whatever the case may be).

Since the secession of Buenos Aires Province on 11 September 1852, on the aftermath of the Battle of Caseros, Argentina was divided between two competing states, the Argentine Confederation and the State of Buenos Aires. The Battle of Cepeda (1859) and the subsequent Pact of San José de Flores of 1860 set the conditions for Buenos Aires to rejoin the confederation (which came to be called Argentine Republic since the 1860 reform of the Constitution on Buenos Aires request). However, both sides would clash again soon after.

=== Conflicts in the interior ===
During president Urquiza's government, the provinces had been at peace, with the notable exception of San Juan Province, where a political crime served as the catalyst for the Battle of Cepeda between Buenos Aires Province and the confederation. This changed when president Santiago Derqui took office.

- Several local caudillos, generically unitarians, had been at peace with the government of the Argentine Confederation. When Derqui assumed office, they publicly became part of the opposition. Such were the cases of Manuel Taboada, from Santiago del Estero Province, and José María del Campo of Tucumán Province.
- Córdoba's governor Mariano Fragueiro maneuvered poorly in his relations with the opposition. When the situation became violent, President Derqui intervened the provincial government (Derqui was from Córdoba).
- The most serious situation developed once again in San Juan Province, where governor José Antonio Virasoro was deposed and assassinated with the apparent support of some politicians acting in Buenos Aires, among them the future President Domingo Faustino Sarmiento, who was born in San Juan. President Derqui again sent the national army to intervene that province, but the new governor, Antonino Aberastain, attempted to resist the intervention with the local militia. Aberastain was defeated and assassinated, which allowed the Buenos Aires government to accuse President Derqui of having committed a crime.

=== Elections in Buenos Aires ===
As a part of the process leading to the reincorporation of the State of Buenos Aires into the Argentine Confederation, established in the Pact of San José de Flores, after the 1859 Battle of Cepeda, Buenos Aires elected provincial deputies to the National Congress. However, the elections were carried out following the electoral laws of the State of Buenos Aires instead of those of the confederation. The elected deputies were rejected by the National Congress and the Buenos Aires Senators also staged a walkout, in solidarity.

President Santiago Derqui issued a decree invalidating the elections in Buenos Aires and established a new date for a rerun. But the Buenos Aires authorities rebelled against the national government and declared the Pact of San José de Flores null.

=== Civil war ===
The National Congress considered this as an act of sedition, so President Derqui named Entre Ríos's general and former president Justo José de Urquiza as the commander in chief of the national army with the task of returning the rebel province to the fold. In Buenos Aires, Governor Bartolomé Mitre took the post of commander in chief of the provincial army.

There were several attempts at mediation, from individuals, and foreign governments. All of them failed due to Mitre's and Derqui's intransigence. Urquiza tried, until the last moment, to preserve the peace and declined to take the initiative against the porteño army as it was the request of his colonels Ricardo López Jordán and Prudencio Arnold.

President Derqui organized an army in Córdoba, gathering an heterogeneous group of infantry units. These forces were augmented by Urquiza's, with people from Entre Ríos, Corrientes and Santa Fé provinces, plus some porteño defectors; the majority of these forces being cavalry units. In sum, the federalist army had about 17,000 men, where 8,000 came from the center region and 9,000 from Entre Ríos, Corrientes, Buenos Aires and Santa Fé.

Mitre's army was made of 22,000 men and 35 artillery pieces, plus a considerable numeric superiority of arms and artillery and infantry training. The British had supplied the artillery pieces and the trained British artillery crews to operate them. Derqui advanced up to Rosario, where he left the command of the troops in the hands of general Urquiza, while Mitre advanced to the north of Buenos Aires and advanced into Santa Fé province.

== The battle ==
The armies clashed by the Pavón creek, (40 km (25 mi) south of the city of Rosario, Santa Fe Province, about 260 km (162 mi) northwest of Buenos Aires. Urquiza formed his troops in a defensive position, forming an extended line due east of the Domingo Palacios ranch. On the wings he formed his cavalry.

Arriving at 800 m (2,625 ft) from the ranch, Mitre deployed his infantry, preparing for an assault on the enemy's center. But Urquiza's artillery started combat, opening great gaps in the porteño infantry, easy targets due to their colorful uniforms.

The fighting lasted only two hours, during which the federalist left wing under colonel major Juan Saá, with the Santa Fé and renegade porteño troops of Ricardo López Jordán, completely vanquished the porteño First Cavalry, under general and former Uruguayan president Venancio Flores, chasing them past Arroyo del Medio (a creek forming the border between Buenos Aires and Santa Fe provinces). The porteño Second Cavalry, under the command of veteran general Manuel Hornos, offered more resistance; but it had to retreat, leaving behind most of their heavier weapons and supplies plus many prisoners. The right wing, under General Miguel Galarza, steamrolled the small left-wing cavalry of Buenos Aires.

The federalist center, instead, composed by untrained militia from the central regions of the country, was forced to retreat by the better trained and equipped porteño infantry battalions.

Seeing the center's collapse, Urquiza abandoned the field of battle without adding the 4,000 men from Entre Ríos that he had maintained in reserve, and marched to Rosario, then followed to San Lorenzo and Las Barrancas. At that point he received information of his cavalry's victory but he did not return to the battlefield. Urquiza's unexpected decision left the field open to the porteño army, which had retreated to San Nicolás de los Arroyos. Mitre decided then to consolidate his position before marching later on Santa Fe.

== Consequences ==
The battles of Cepeda, Caseros and Pavón were possibly some of the armed conflicts with the most significance in Argentine history, by its institutional consequences, as by the realignment of almost every other political actor after each of the battles.

After seeing Urquiza's inaction, Mitre gathered his troops. Part of the federalist cavalry advanced to Pergamino, occupying the town. After a reaction from the porteño cavalry, the federalists retreated back to Santa Fé, and Mitre started his advance into that province. Several months had passed from the date of the battle. In the following months, the porteño advance was unstoppable. The only federalist army capable of opposing them was Urquiza's, but he did not act and almost dismantled it.

Seeing the interior being invaded, Derqui resigned and took refuge in Montevideo. A few weeks later vice-president Juan Esteban Pedernera declared the national government dissolved. Starting on that moment, Mitre projected his influence in the whole country: all the federal governors – with the notable exception of Urquiza – were deposed in the final weeks of the year and the first few weeks of 1862. Some were deposed by local unitarians, counting on the vicinity of the Buenos Aires army, others directly by the invading porteño army. The ones that avoided that fate, came together to accept that the national government was over, and left to Buenos Aires governor Bartolomé Mitre the task of the national reorganization.

Mitre was elected president of the nation by means of new elections – organized by the new provincial governors- from where federalist candidates were forbidden. Porteños also took the national government ministries and a good deal of the seats in Congress.

The country's capital, which had been relocated to Paraná by Urquiza, was again moved to Buenos Aires city, so the national government had to accept being a guest of the Buenos Aires city government. In the following years, Argentina maintained a nominal federal organization, but the strength and preponderance of Buenos Aires was unbroken.
