= Manuel Guillermo Pinto =

Argentine general and lawmaker

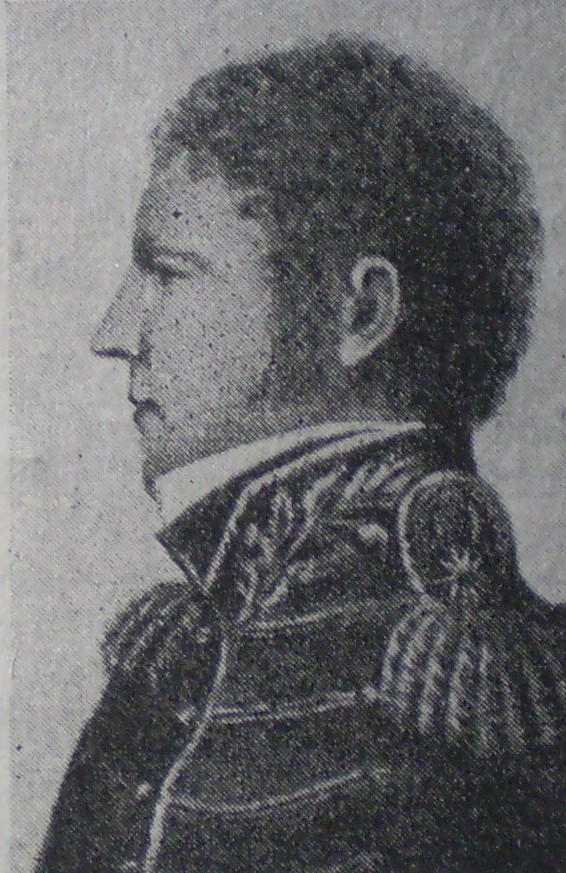
Manuel Pinto

Manuel Guillermo Pinto (1783 – June 28, 1853) was an Argentine general and lawmaker.

Pinto was born in Buenos Aires, and studied at the Royal College of San Carlos. He completed further studies in Spain, but returned to fight during the British invasions of the Río de la Plata, in 1807. He was among the signatories to the Cabildo abierto that voted in favor of Independence on May 22, 1810, and fought during the Argentine War of Independence in various auxiliary posts, reaching the rank of colonel in 1815.

Pinto served as leader of the Council of Representatives during the progressive tenure of Buenos Aires Province Governor Martín Rodríguez, from 1821 to 1824, and represented Misiones Province from 1824 to 1827. He was again elected President of the Buenos Aires Legislature in 1833, but stepped down upon the granting of absolute power to Governor Juan Manuel de Rosas, in 1835.

He returned to public life following the defeat of Rosas in the Battle of Caseros in 1852, and following the September 11, 1852, uprising by the province in a bid for greater autonomy, he twice served as provisional governor: from September 11 to October 31, 1852, and December 7, 1852, until his death.

== See also ==
- List of presidents of Argentina

| Preceded by José Miguel Galan | Governor of Buenos Aires; Sep 1852 – Oct 1852 | Succeeded by Valentín Alsina |
| Preceded by Valentín Alsina | Governor of Buenos Aires; 1852 – 1853 | Succeeded by Junta of ministers |
