= Battle of Cepeda (1859) =

1859 battle in Argentina

Coordinates: 33°22′53″S 60°34′59″W

- Part of the War between the Argentine Confederation and the state of Buenos Aires
Date	23 October 1859
Location	Buenos Aires Province, Argentina
Result	Argentine Confederation victory

Belligerents
Argentine Confederation	State of Buenos Aires

Commanders and leaders
Justo José de Urquiza	Bartolomé Mitre; Luis María Campos

Strength
Total: 14,000–15,000: 10,000 horsemen; 3,000 infantry; 1,000 artillerymen and auxiliaries; 32 cannons	Total: 9,000: 4,000 horsemen; 4,700 infantrymen; 300 artillerymen; 26 cannons

The Battle of Cepeda of 1859 took place on October 23 at Cañada de Cepeda, Buenos Aires Province, Argentina. The Argentine Confederation army, led by federalist Justo José de Urquiza defeated the State of Buenos Aires forces, led by unitarian Bartolomé Mitre.

== Context ==
On the aftermath of the Battle of Caseros, following the San Nicolás Agreement that convened the Constitutional Congress of 1853, the Province of Buenos Aires seceded from the Argentine Confederation and established an independent State, the State of Buenos Aires. However, the Confederation still depended on the port of Buenos Aires for its foreign trade. Moreover, Urquiza's policy of seduction towards the rebel Province had failed, and the secessionist state elected as its governor the radical autonomist and Unitarian Valentín Alsina in 1857.

On April 1, 1859, following the assassination of former San Juan Province Governor Nazareno Benavídez by a presumed Buenos Aires agent, the Confederation Congress passed a law by which the President Justo José de Urquiza was obliged to "peacefully reincorporate the dissident province of Buenos Aires", but if that was not possible, he was allowed to use the national army to accomplish that purpose.

The government of Buenos Aires interpreted that law as a formal declaration of war. In May, the state legislature allowed the governor to repel any military aggression with the province's militia. Colonel Bartolomé Mitre, in charge of Buenos Aires troops, was ordered to attack Santa Fe Province, and the navy was sent to blockade Paraná, the capital of the Confederation.

With the imminence of conflict, Brazil, Paraguay, the United States and the United Kingdom tried to prevent it by diplomatic means. The neighboring country of Paraguay sent a young Francisco Solano López as a plenipotentiary minister to intercede in the emergency. However, every attempt at a peaceful resolution of the conflict failed since Buenos Aires demanded Urquiza's resignation as president, which the Confederation refused.

== Battle ==
The army of the Confederation met Buenos Aires forces at Cañada de Cepeda, north of Pergamino. After some tactical movements, both forces clashed on the afternoon of October 23. By dusk, Mitre knew that his forces were defeated and so the bonaerense army retired towards San Nicolás de los Arroyos from where they embarked back to Buenos Aires.

== Aftermath ==
Urquiza did not enter Buenos Aires City but camped at the neighboring town of San José de Flores to carry on with the negotiations. Governor Valentín Alsina was forced by his own allies to leave office because of his intransigent position to the reintegration of Buenos Aires to the Confederation.

On November 11, on the mediation of Francisco Solano López of Paraguay, Buenos Aires and the Argentine Confederation signed the San José de Flores Pact by which Buenos Aires was de jure reincorporated into Argentina but the province was allowed certain privileges.

That would eventually led to the Battle of Pavón and the growing predominance of Buenos Aires Province.

== See also ==
- Argentine Confederation
- San Nicolás Agreement
- Argentine Constitution of 1853
- Pact of San José de Flores
- Battle of Pavón
