= Valentín Alsina =

Argentine lawyer and politician

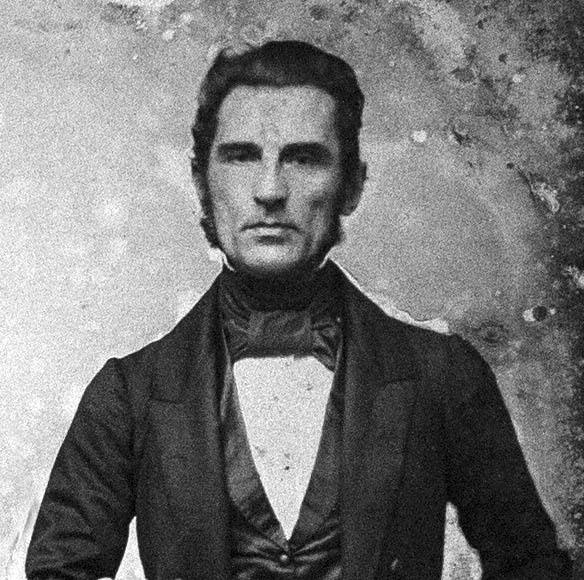
- Daguerreotype of Alsina, 1854

National Senator
- In office May 2, 1868 – September 6, 1869
- Constituency: Buenos Aires
- In office May 24, 1862 – April 30, 1868
- Constituency: Buenos Aires

Provisional President of the Senate
- In office 1865–1869
- Preceded by: Pedro Ferré
- Succeeded by: Salustiano Zavalía
- In office 1862–1864
- Preceded by: Marcos Paz
- Succeeded by: Pedro Ferré

Governor of Buenos Aires
- In office December 21, 1858 – October 23, 1859
- Preceded by: Pastor Obligado
- Succeeded by: Felipe Llavallol
- In office October 31, 1852 – December 7, 1852
- Preceded by: Manuel Guillermo Pinto
- Succeeded by: Manuel Guillermo Pinto

Personal details
- Born: December 16, 1802 Buenos Aires, Viceroyalty of the Rio de la Plata
- Died: September 6, 1869 (aged 66) Buenos Aires, Argentina
- Party: Unitarian Party
- Spouse: Antonia Maza de Alsina
- Profession: Lawyer

Valentín Alsina (December 16, 1802 – September 6, 1869) was an Argentine lawyer and politician.

== Biography ==
=== Early life ===
Alsina was born in Buenos Aires and studied law at the University of Córdoba. He occupied diverse posts in government, and had a successful civil career as an advocate and professor of law at the University of Buenos Aires.

=== Political views ===
Under the government of Juan Manuel de Rosas, he had to leave the country, as his liberal ideas did not please the dictator at all. From his refuge in Montevideo, he supported the opposition against de Rosas, both financially and through publications.

When Rosas was deposed by Justo José de Urquiza, Alsina returned to Buenos Aires, and he was elected provincial Governor in 1852. However, he resigned after a few months, shortly before a military coup took place. In 1853, Buenos Aires left the Argentine Confederation and declared itself an independent state. Alsina, a fervent supporter of Buenos Aires Province independence, became Governor again in 1857. In 1859, open hostilities broke out between Buenos Aires and the Argentine Confederation, led by Urquiza. After the defeat of the Buenos Aires army at the Battle of Cepeda on October 23, 1859, Alsina had to resign his post, and shortly after Buenos Aires rejoined the Confederation. Alsina became a member of the Argentine Senate in 1862.

When Bartolomé Mitre (President of Argentina between 1862 and 1868) offered him a position as member of the Argentine Supreme Court he refused and remained serving as a Senator until his death, which occurred just a few months after he took the oath of his son Adolfo Alsina, who became Vice President of Argentina in 1868.

== See also ==
- List of presidents of Argentina

Preceded by Manuel Guillermo Pinto	Governor of Buenos Aires Province; 1852	Succeeded by Manuel Guillermo Pinto
Preceded by Pastor Obligado	Governor of Buenos Aires Province; 1858–1859	Succeeded by Felipe Llavallol
