= Justo José de Urquiza =

General and first constitutional president of Argentina

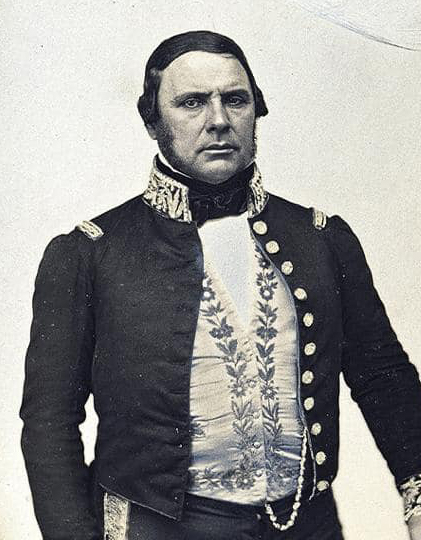
- Portrait daguerreotype by Charles D. Fredricks, c. 1852

3rd President of Argentina
- In office March 5, 1854 – March 4, 1860
- Vice President: Salvador María del Carril
- Succeeded by: Santiago Derqui

Provisional Director of the Argentine Confederation
- In office May 31, 1852 – March 4, 1854
- Preceded by: Office created
- Succeeded by: Office abolished

Governor of Entre Ríos
- In office May 1, 1868 – April 11, 1870
- Preceded by: José María Domínguez
- Succeeded by: Ricardo López Jordán
- In office May 1, 1860 – April 30, 1864
- Succeeded by: José María Domínguez
- In office April 7, 1842 – September 10, 1852
- Preceded by: Francisco Dionisio Álvarez
- In office January 1, 1842 – January 28, 1842
- Preceded by: Vicente Zapata
- Succeeded by: Pedro Pablo Seguí

Governor of Buenos Aires
- In office July 26, 1852 – September 3, 1852
- Preceded by: Vicente López
- Succeeded by: José Miguel Galán

Personal details
- Born: October 18, 1801 Talar de Arroyo Largo, Entre Ríos
- Died: April 11, 1870 (aged 68) San José Palace, Entre Ríos
- Party: Federalist Party
- Spouse(s): Segunda Calvento; Dolores Costa; Cruz López Jordán

Justo José de Urquiza y García (Spanish pronunciation: [ˈxusto xoˈse ðe wɾˈkisa]; October 18, 1801 – April 11, 1870) was an Argentine general and politician who served as president of the Argentine Confederation from 1854 to 1860.

== Life ==
Justo José de Urquiza y García was born in Entre Ríos, the son of José Narciso de Urquiza Álzaga, born in Castro Urdiales, Spain, and María Cándida García González, a Creole of Buenos Aires.

Like many other nineteenth-century Argentine patriots, Urquiza was a freemason. His imposing Palacio San José has been interpreted as containing many masonic symbols, created "to symbolize and reflect the construction of his other work: the Argentine State".

== Presidency ==
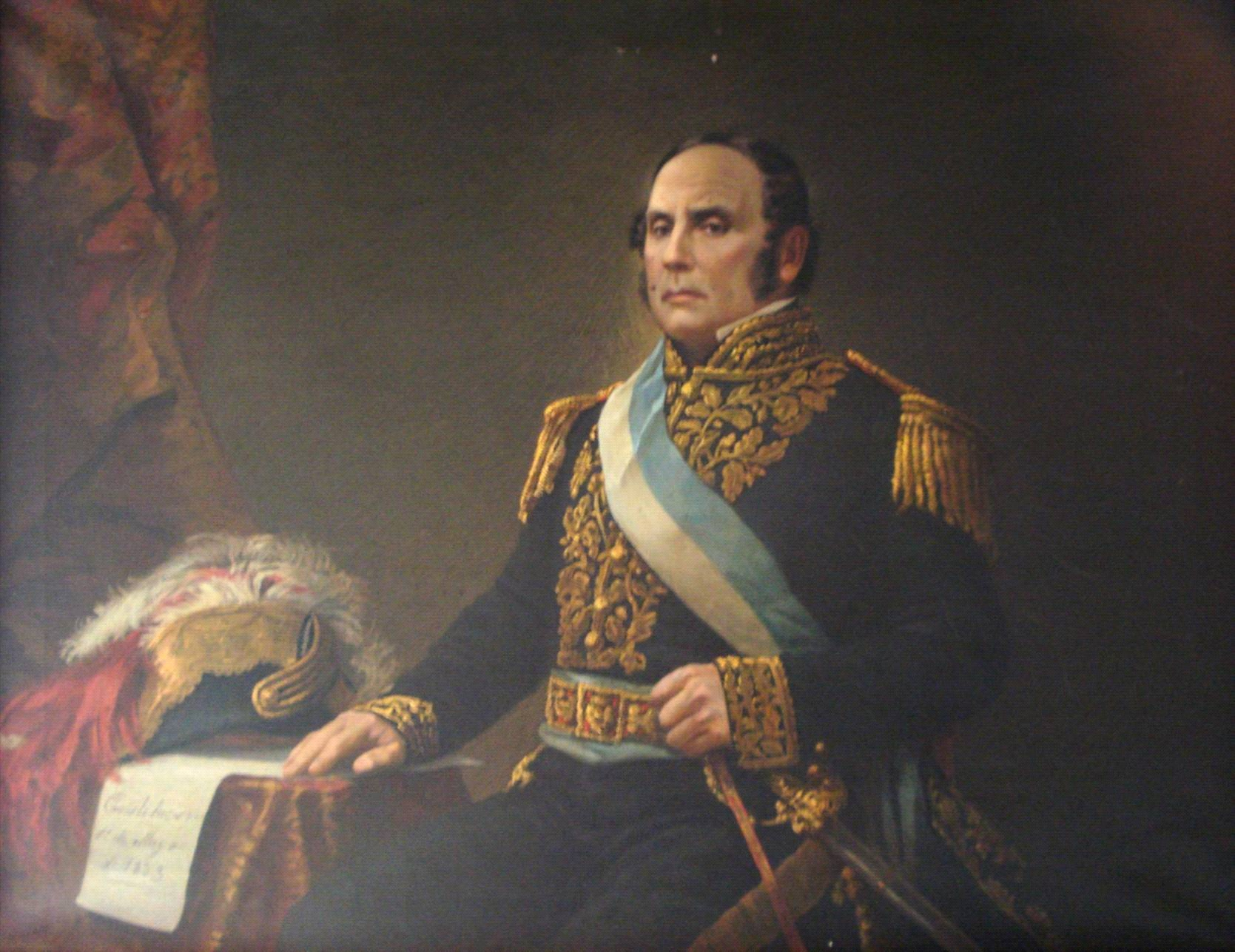

=== Overview ===
Urquiza was governor of Entre Ríos during the government of Juan Manuel de Rosas, governor of Buenos Aires with powers delegated from the other provinces. Rosas presented a resignation to his charge frequently, but only as a political gesture, counting that the other governments would reject it. However, in 1851, resentful of the economic and political dominance of Buenos Aires, Urquiza accepted Rosas' resignation and resumed for Entre Rios the powers delegated in Buenos Aires. Along with the resuming of international commerce without passing through the port of Buenos Aires, Urquiza replaced the "Death to the savage unitarians!" slogan with "Death to the enemies of national organization!", requesting the making of a national constitution that Rosas had long rejected. Supported by Brazil and the Uruguayan liberals, he created the Grand Army and forced Manuel Oribe to capitulate, ending the long siege of Montevideo in October 1851, and finally defeating Rosas on 3 February 1852 at the Battle of Caseros. The other provinces that supported Rosas against Urquiza's pronunciation changed sides and supported his project of creating a National Constitution.

Urquiza immediately began the task of national organization. He became provisional director of the Argentine Confederation in May 1852. In 1853, a constituent assembly adopted a constitution based primarily on the ideas of Juan Bautista Alberdi. Urquiza was elected president, with the Unitarian politician from San Juan, Salvador María del Carril, as vice president. (Note: Urquiza received the votes of 94 electors; Mariano Fragueiro received seven; and Benjamín Virasoro, José María Paz, Pedro Ferré, and Vicente López y Planes each received one. For vice president, the vote was more fragmented and no candidate obtained a majority. The Congress of the Confederation therefore had to choose between the two candidates with the most votes, Del Carril and Facundo Zuviría. See Bosch (1991), p. 199.) The capital was established provisionally in the capital of Entre Ríos Province; for this purpose, the entire territory of the province was federalized and came to be governed directly by the president. In this way, Urquiza continued to govern his province, although the municipalities retained a certain degree of autonomy. Urquiza was inaugurated president in March 1854.

During his administration, foreign relations were improved, public education was encouraged, colonization was promoted, and plans for railroad construction was initiated. His work of national organization was, however, hindered by the opposition of Buenos Aires, which seceded from the Confederation. Open war broke out in 1859. Urquiza defeated the provincial army led by Bartolomé Mitre in October 1859, at the Battle of Cepeda, and Buenos Aires agreed to re-enter the Confederation.

Constitutional amendments proposed by Buenos Aires were adopted in 1860 but the settlement was short-lived, and further difficulties culminated in civil war. Urquiza met the army of Buenos Aires, again led by Mitre, in September 1861. The battle was indecisive, but Urquiza withdrew from the field, leaving the victory with Mitre. He retired to San José Palace, his residence in Entre Ríos, where he ruled until he was assassinated at age 69 (along with his sons Justo and Waldino) by followers of dissident and political rival Ricardo López Jordán.

=== Domestic policy ===
Urquiza assumed the presidency on 5 March 1854. A few days later he travelled to Córdoba to preside over a meeting of the governors of the neighbouring provinces, by which he sought to demonstrate their firm unity in the face of threats both from the policy of Buenos Aires and from the recent history of divisions among them.

Once established in Paraná, Urquiza called elections for deputies and senators, inaugurating the first sessions of the National Congress on 22 October 1854. The organization of the judiciary presented greater difficulties because of the shortage of qualified personnel: although the president appointed the members of the Supreme Court and enacted the law organizing the federal chambers, the federal judiciary never actually came into operation.

The Confederation lacked the political and economic resources to undertake major public initiatives. One of the areas in which it achieved the greatest success was the formation of a national army. Provincial forces remained autonomous, but the government succeeded in organizing military regions that could later function as military units.

A first attempt was made to create a railway linking Rosario—the fastest-growing city in that period, which would soon become the most populous in the interior—with Chile, benefiting desert areas along the route. The first studies in this regard gave discouraging results, so the government considered combining this plan with a railway to Córdoba, which would in itself finance construction of the first section of the railway to Chile. (Note: The route planned by the project deviated several dozen kilometres to the south, toward present-day Villa María, since the idea was to create a junction there with the railway to Mendoza and Chile. That branch line—to Mendoza—would not be built until 1885. See Cuccorese (1969), pp. 50–56.) The plan developed by engineer William Wheelwright could not be carried out by the government of the Confederation because of a lack of financial resources.

To make up for the absence of railways, communications were modernized through the establishment of mensajerías, private companies that transported passengers, mail, and high-value cargo in stagecoaches, linking most of the country's cities, and which also operated in the interior of Buenos Aires Province.

In the provinces of the Confederation, landowners lacked access to credit, (Note: An exceptional case was that of General Urquiza, a large-scale landowner in his province who enjoyed easy access to financial resources. See Sáenz Quesada (1980), pp. 173–178.) since they had neither the economic nor the financial resources to expand. For this reason, the growth of agricultural and livestock production in the littoral provinces was driven by the creation of agricultural colonies in their territory, which attracted European immigrants. The first successful agricultural colony was Esperanza, founded by Aarón Castellanos in 1855 with Swiss immigrants. Many other colonies were founded in Santa Fe and Entre Ríos in those years; a well-known case is Colonia San José, founded by General Urquiza in 1857. Nevertheless, for the system to become widespread it would require the support of the railway network, which would only expand in later years.

=== Foreign relations ===
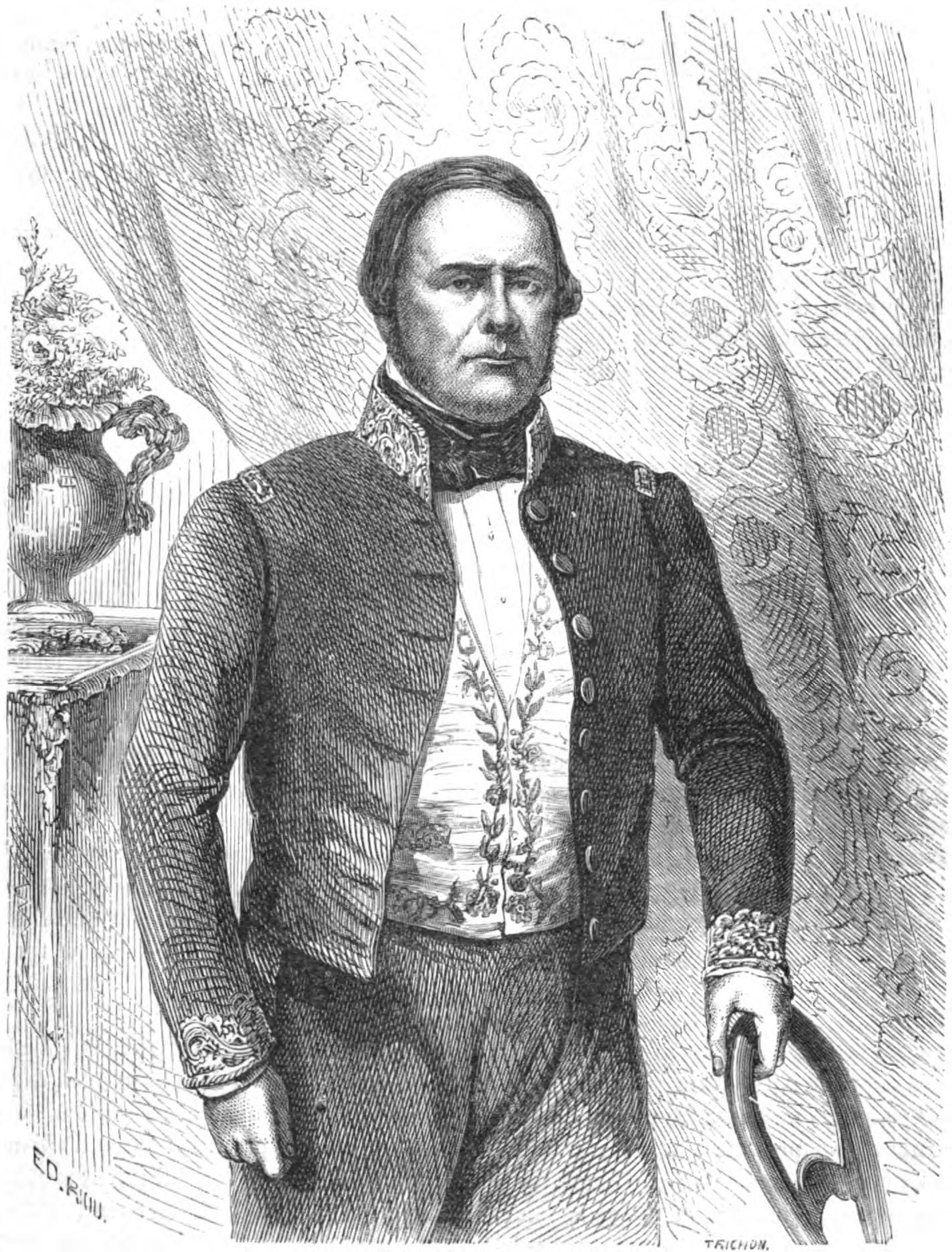
Urquiza, president of the Argentine Confederation

The division between the Confederation and Buenos Aires posed a problem for foreign diplomats accredited to Argentina: although they recognized Urquiza's authority over the entire country, the overwhelming majority of their commercial interests and resident citizens were located in Buenos Aires. They therefore maintained plenipotentiary ministers in Paraná and consuls in Buenos Aires, while attempting to mediate in favour of national unity.

Despite the importance the national government attached to relations with the main foreign powers, its first priority was securing recognition of Argentine independence by Spain. Juan Bautista Alberdi represented the Confederation before the Spanish Crown, obtaining the signing of a treaty with Spain on 9 July 1859, by which the former metropole recognized Argentine independence; it was rejected by Buenos Aires because it recognized the Spanish citizenship of the children of Spaniards born in Argentina, that is, jus sanguinis, which meant turning much-needed immigration into a threat to Argentine nationality.

Great Britain obtained the annulment of the 1849 treaty by which Rosas had compelled that country to recognize Argentine sovereignty over its inland rivers.

Diplomatic relations were also resumed with the Holy See, with which Argentina had had no relations since the disputes over royal patronage in the 1830s.

Relations with Brazil were oriented mainly toward the question of navigation on the rivers and the relations of both countries with Paraguay. Relations with the latter country—jealous defender of all the attributes of its sovereignty—were clouded by the firm stance of the Paraguayan government toward foreign powers, especially the United States, which nearly attacked that country over a minor incident. The favourable resolution of that issue facilitated Paraguayan mediation in resolving the conflicts between Buenos Aires and the Confederation in 1859.

=== Financial situation ===
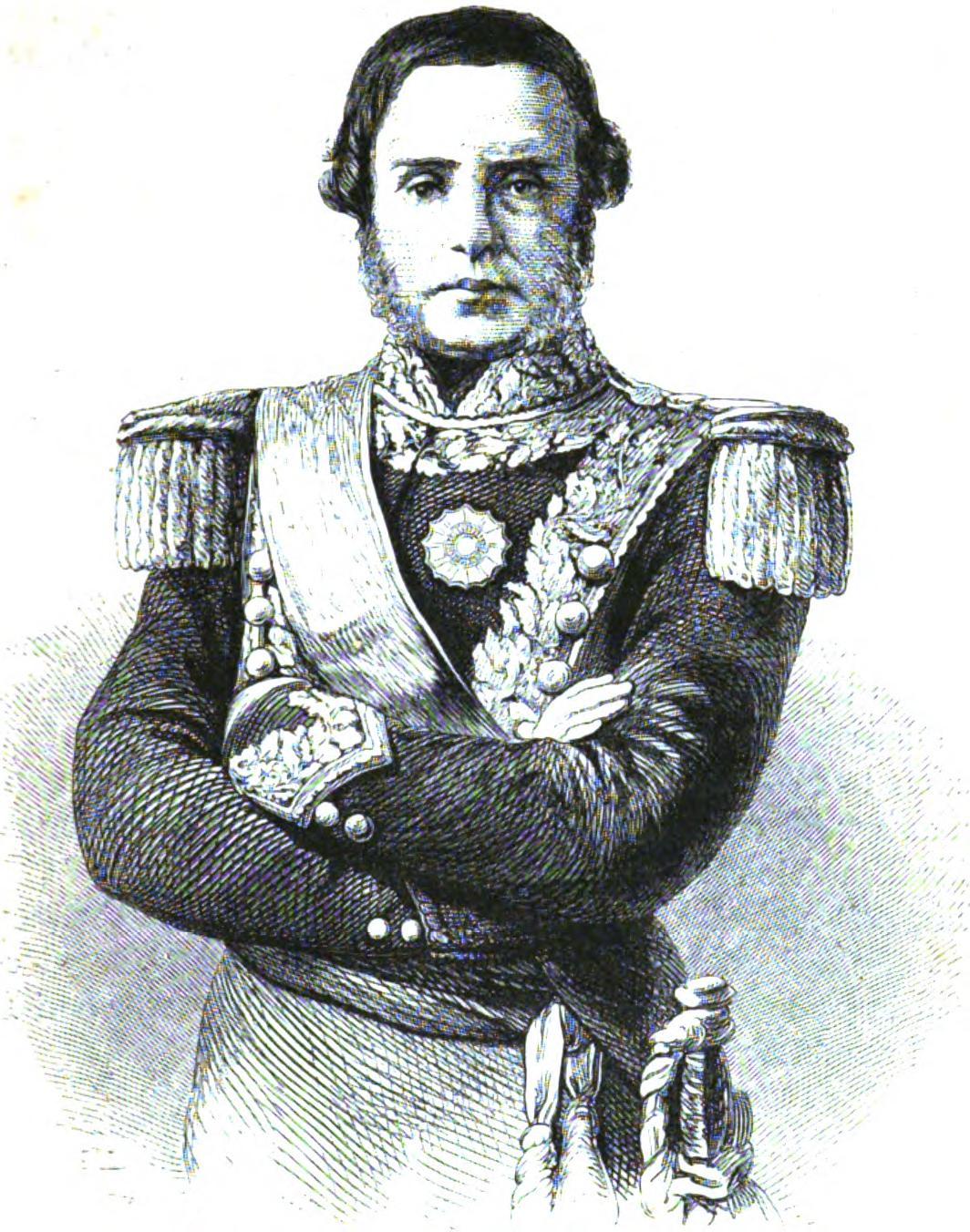
Justo José de Urquiza, president of the Argentine Confederation

The Confederation began its constitutional period with serious economic and financial problems: lack of resources, dependence on the port of Buenos Aires for foreign trade, internal barriers arising from provincial customs houses and transit duties, difficulties in communications and in the transport of goods, limited agricultural development, and stagnation of artisanal industry. The organization of the national treasury was hampered by the poor revenues of the Confederation's external customs houses and the lack of an efficient tax system; hence the economic penury of the confederal administration. Nor did it succeed in creating a reliable banking system, so credit was very costly, and successive attempts to issue paper money ended in failure.

A project by the finance minister, Mariano Fragueiro, led to the creation of the National Bank of the Confederation, which opened its doors in 1854 and issued paper money. However, it lacked backing, so it had to be declared legal tender; the provinces rejected it and merchants refused to accept it. The bank had to close and the paper money was withdrawn from circulation.

It was then decided to attack the country's divided economic structure, which benefited Buenos Aires: the Law of Differential Duties, enacted in 1856, sought to increase the Confederation's trade with foreign powers and to harm the interests of Buenos Aires. The law established that foreign goods originating from cabos adentro—that is, previously unloaded at another port on the Río de la Plata—would pay double the ordinary duty if introduced into the Confederation, compared with goods entering directly through the Confederation's ports; a later law established differential export duties as well.

However, the measures did not produce the expected results: although trade volume increased in the port of Rosario, and a Brazilian financier—the Baron of Mauá—even founded a bank in that city, Buenos Aires remained the country's financial centre. The urgent need for money was met through new loans, such as those contracted with Mauá, but the interest rates were exceptionally high, reaching 24 percent. Urquiza came to the conclusion that the only way to end the Confederation's economic problems was the reincorporation of the dissident province at any price.

=== Buenos Aires and the interior provinces ===
During the governorship of Pastor Obligado, the rebel province enacted its own constitution and enjoyed rapid economic growth.

After Lagos's defeat, most of the federalists of Buenos Aires emigrated to Paraná, Rosario, or Montevideo, from where they planned to return by invading their province. In January 1854, Lagos briefly occupied the north of the province for a few days. In November of the same year, General Jerónimo Costa advanced at the head of 600 men, but was defeated.

In December 1855 there was another attempt, when José María Flores landed at Ensenada, while Costa did so near Zárate with fewer than 200 men. Governor Obligado decreed the death penalty for all officers involved in that invasion, officially declaring them bandits. Flores managed to flee, but Costa advanced toward Buenos Aires with his small force. On 31 January 1856 he was defeated by Emilio Conesa near San Justo; most of the soldiers were killed when they surrendered, and the officers were shot two days later.

The federalists cried out for revenge, but Urquiza decided to be more prudent: he signed a pacification treaty with Buenos Aires, which allowed both sides to enjoy three years of peace.

During the governorship of Valentín Alsina, elected in 1857, the Buenos Aires government adopted a highly aggressive policy, rejecting the Law of Differential Duties and setting aside the peace treaties. To break the resistance of the Confederation, it supported movements in the provinces aimed at integrating them into a process of unity under Buenos Aires leadership. The Buenos Aires press became still more aggressive, urging the Buenos Aires government either to wage war against the Confederation or to declare definitive independence.

The interior provinces were periodically shaken by revolutions; the two most stable were Santiago del Estero and Corrientes, whose governments were considered more inclined toward the policy of Buenos Aires than that of Urquiza.

=== Toward a new civil war ===
The assassination in 1859 of the San Juan caudillo Nazario Benavídez was celebrated by the Buenos Aires press: Sarmiento regarded his death as a triumph of "civilization", and the newspaper La Tribuna predicted the same fate for Urquiza. President Urquiza sent a federal intervention, which uncovered abundant links between the revolutionaries and the government of Buenos Aires.

The intervention of the Buenos Aires authorities in the internal politics of another province caused great indignation in the government of Paraná: a law invalidated all public acts generated by the Buenos Aires government, and in May 1859 Congress ordered the military mobilization of the population and authorized Urquiza to resolve the problem of national unity

by means of peaceful negotiations or war, as circumstances might advise.

The commander of the Buenos Aires army, Colonel Bartolomé Mitre, received orders to invade Santa Fe Province.

=== Battle of Cepeda ===
Faced with the imminence of conflict, the United States, the United Kingdom, Brazil, and Paraguay attempted friendly mediation. But neither Alsina nor Mitre would accept anything short of Urquiza's resignation or war. Urquiza, for his part—who since 1852 had always tried to negotiate—was now particularly enraged by the assassination of Benavídez and by the press's praise of the crime.

The Buenos Aires warships blockaded the port of Paraná, but a mutiny aboard one of these ships, which was handed over to the national government, forced the blockade to be lifted. In mid-October, after a brief naval engagement, the federal squadron appeared off Buenos Aires.

The army of the Confederation, led by Urquiza, began its campaign toward Buenos Aires from Rosario; it consisted of 14,000 men—10,000 cavalry and 3,000 infantry—with 35 cannon and howitzers; several divisions of Ranquel Indigenous people served as auxiliaries.

The Buenos Aires army operated from San Nicolás de los Arroyos; it had 9,000 men—4,700 infantry and 4,000 cavalry—with 24 artillery pieces, under the command of Mitre, minister of war. The Buenos Aires forces were greatly reduced because a large part of them had to protect the provincial frontier from Indigenous incursions, some of whose leaders—such as Juan Calfucurá—were allied with Urquiza, and whose raids formed part of his strategy.

On 23 October the Battle of Cepeda began. Before launching the attack, Urquiza addressed his troops:

I have sought to avoid bloodshed and I have sought peace. The government of Buenos Aires insists on provoking us with an army that cannot resist us. Very well then, let us conquer by force of arms a lasting peace.

— Urquiza

The initial advantage favoured the infantry of Buenos Aires, but Urquiza's skillful use of cavalry allowed him to seize the offensive, and three Buenos Aires battalions were destroyed. A flanking manoeuvre ordered by Mitre disorganized the entire formation, and nightfall stopped the battle when victory for the Confederation was already evident.

The Buenos Aires army suffered heavy losses: 100 dead, 90 wounded, and 2,000 prisoners, in addition to 21 cannon. The national army suffered 300 fatalities. In the middle of the night, Mitre led an orderly withdrawal to San Nicolás, where he arrived the following afternoon with only 2,000 men. He then embarked his entire army, and—after a brief engagement—managed to transfer it to Buenos Aires.

=== Pact of San José de Flores ===
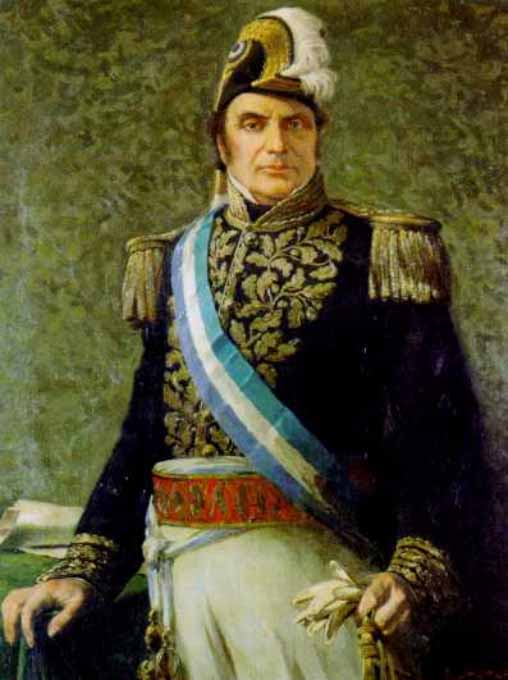
Oil portrait of Urquiza

Urquiza advanced rapidly on the city; on the way he sent several pacifist proclamations, such as the one that stated:

I have come to wrest power from a clique that exercises it for its own benefit in order to return it to the people, who will use it for their prosperity. At the end of my political career, my only ambition is to contemplate from the tranquillity of my home a united and happy Argentine Republic, which has cost me many years of harsh toil ... I come to offer you a lasting peace under the flag of our forefathers, under a common law, protective and noble.

— Urquiza

Although he could have entered Buenos Aires by force, he preferred to camp near it—in the town of San José de Flores—from where he began negotiations. Throughout the talks, Urquiza maintained the threat of an immediate assault on the city, and on 8 November he obtained the resignation of Valentín Alsina.

As a result of complex negotiations—in which Francisco Solano López, son of the Paraguayan president, acted as mediator—the Pact of San José de Flores, also known as the Pact of National Union, was signed on 11 November between Urquiza and the provisional governor Felipe Llavallol. It established that Buenos Aires declared itself an integral part of the Confederation and renounced control over its foreign relations, but would review the Constitution of 1853 through a provincial convention and propose amendments to it. The Customs House of Buenos Aires was declared nationalized, but the Nation would compensate the income of Buenos Aires Province for five years whenever it was lower than that of 1859. A clause not incorporated into the pact but agreed orally between the parties established that the reincorporation of the province into the Nation would take place after the end of Urquiza's presidential term.

Many federalists from the interior disagreed with the pact: from their point of view, Urquiza had reached San José de Flores as the victor, but had negotiated as though he were the defeated party; instead of punishing the province for its rebellion, he had rewarded it. One of the critics was General Ricardo López Jordán, one of the victorious commanders at Cepeda.

== Political views ==
He supported a liberal constitution which was pro-economic liberalism, due this he is seen by some as a classical liberal.

== Tributes ==
There are many streets, parks and squares all over Argentina that are named after Justo José de Urquiza, such as the Urquiza park in Rosario or the Urquiza park in Parana City. There is a central street in Rosario called Urquiza, and there is a commuter railway line in Buenos Aires named after him, the Urquiza Line. The Colegio del Uruguay, founded by Urquiza, was later renamed in his honor.

== Notes ==
Political offices
Preceded by Vicente López y Planes	President of Argentina; 1854–1860	Succeeded by Santiago Derqui
