= Argentine Constitution of 1853 =

Original version of the present-day Argentinian constitution

Constitution of Argentina of 1853
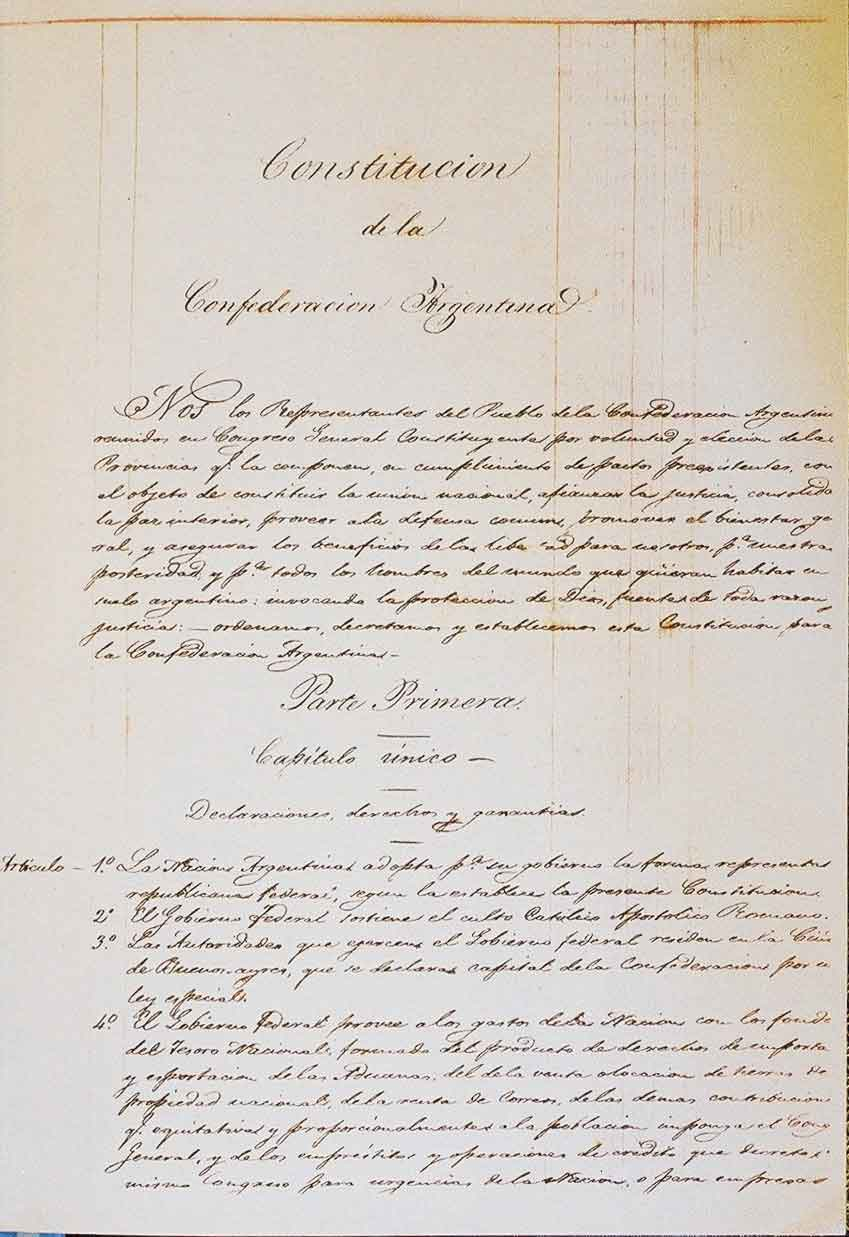
- Cover of the original manuscript of the 1853 Constitution
- Ratified: 1 May 1853
- Signatories: 1853 Constituent Assembly

Full text
- Constitution of Argentina at Wikisource

The current Constitution of the Argentine Republic dates back to 1853. The Argentine Constitution of 1853 was approved in 1853 by almost all of the provincial governments with the exception of Buenos Aires Province, which remained separate from the Argentine Confederation until 1859. After several modifications to the original constitution and the return of power to Buenos Aires' Unitarian Party, it was sanctioned on May 1, 1853, by the Constitutional Convention that had gathered in Santa Fe. The document was promulgated by the provisional director of the national executive government, Justo José de Urquiza, who was a member of the Federalist Party. Following the short-lived constitutions of 1819 and 1826, it was the third constitution in the history of the country.

Despite several reforms of varying importance, the 1853 constitution formed the basis of the current Argentine juridical system. It was closely inspired by the juridical and political doctrines of the United States Constitution. It established, for example, a Republican division of powers, a high level of independence for provinces, and a federal power controlled by a strong executive government that was limited by a bicameral national congress to balance the population's representation. It also drew from the previous constitutions, as well as the pioneering works of the jurist Juan Bautista Alberdi.

The model has been frequently criticized by historians of the era. The introduction of a federal system had been characterized by several scholars as being unfeasible and unsuitable for Argentina. Others have charged the introduction with being overtly influenced by the United States Constitution instead of earlier models found in Argentine history. More recently, the constitution has been criticized for placing too much power in the presidency. nonetheless, the historical importance of the constitutional project has been unquestionable, and virtually all disputes regarding the political theory and practice in modern Argentina include either positive or negative references to the political consequences of the 1853 constitution.

For the generation of '80, the founders of the first liberal conventions on Argentine historiography, the constitution represented a true foundational act that broke the long government of Juan Manuel de Rosas. The members of the generation of '80 especially praised the fact that the Constitution established a European-style liberal political regime. However, some of the members of the generation of '80 had voiced opposition at the time that it was sanctioned. For the UCR, a group with social-democratic tendencies, the constitution represented an unfulfilled political ideal against the oligarchic government generation of '80, perpetuated in power through electoral fraud. For the nationalist movements of the 20th century, who criticized the liberal conventions and praised Rosas, the constitution had represented the renouncement of the national identity towards the ruin of liberalism. On different fronts, the discussion remains open, and has inspired several of the most important works of Argentine thought.

== Background ==
=== U.S. Constitution influence ===
The Constitution of 1853 was particularly inspired by the U.S. Constitution, adopting the latter's presidential model, as well as federalism, an essential component of the U.S. constitutional order. The beginning of the Argentine preamble is formalistic but gestures toward its U.S. counterpart. Notably, the preamble paraphrases the famous opening of "We, the People" with "We, the representatives of the people", which emphasizes the strictly representative attributes of the Argentine system.

=== Previous constitutional projects ===
The legal system that was accepted by the United Provinces of the Río de la Plata, formed after the May Revolution from the Viceroyalty of the Río de la Plata, was one of the main concerns after the resignation of the last viceroy. Even though the more urgent concern of establishing sovereign control effective against the resisting Spanish royal forces put the organizational decisions of the republic on hold, much was discussed and written on the matter that would later be taken into account.

The formation of the Primera Junta, and its continuation in the Junta Grande, gave testimony to the disparity of interests between Buenos Aires and the other landlocked provinces. In part, such a division already existed during colonial times, when the port of Buenos Aires gave the city commercial interest far different from the artisanal and agricultural countryside.

Buenos Aires benefited from the flow of goods brought by ships from the United Kingdom, for which it paid with the taxes collected from the exportation of the country's agricultural production, that being mainly raw leather and minerals. The discrepancies between the merchants that brought industrialized goods from Britain and the businessmen of the provinces which lacked such industrial capacity, spurred debates in the Viceroyalty of the Río de la Plata over the lack of modernization. With the Declaration of Independence in 1816, the first juridical bases had a marked Unitarian characteristic.

The first project to converge the successive attempts, that defined the different organs of the national executive power in the first years of organization, was the convocation in 1812 of the Assembly of the Year XIII, also known as the Constituent General Assembly; its purpose was to write the fundamental law for the national organization. It gathered on January 31 of 1813 and worked for over 2 years until 1815. It dictated the regulations for the administration, the statute for the executive power, and promulgated several norms of regulation for the legislature, that would be in use for the following years. However, the assembly was unable to dictate the national constitution. There were 4 constitutional projects; one written by the Patriotic Society, another one by the assessorial commission designated by the Second Triumvirate, and two anonymous republican projects. These last two introduced the division of powers on the model of the French Revolution, even though they were still strongly centralist, delegating most of the public power to the hands of a central executive branch located in Buenos Aires.

This, added to the absence of some provincial deputies, prevented an agreement on the subject. The lack of definitions from the Assembly, after two years of deliberations, was one of the arguments from which Carlos María de Alvear proposed the creation of a temporal one-man regime, known as Directorio (Directorate). The Assembly voted favorably, but since it had no support from the civilian and military leaderships, it forced the creation of a project for the Congress of Tucumán of 1816.

The action of the congress in that sense was limited, though fruitful in other aspects; it declared independence on July 9, 1816. Deliberations regarding the form of government proved harder. In its struggle liberal thinkers compromised with a republican government, and those in favor of a constitutional monarchy. Among the latter was José de San Martín, who proposed to establish a descendant of the Incas on the national throne. The monarchic followers claimed it impossible to erect a republic without historically developed institutions, and that it would form an unstable and weak government, while its opponents pointed to the lack of inherited prejudices as one of the main reasons to attempt a democratic government.

The congress had to be moved to Buenos Aires at the beginning of 1817 after the threat of the Spanish royal forces advancing over the northern part of the country. On December 3 of that year, the provisory regulation was sanctioned. The provincial delegates considered that moving the congress to Buenos Aires was oriented to put pressure on the congressmen to secure benefits for the Buenos Aires porteño in the concluding constitutional text.

In 1819, these fears became true in the project of the Argentine Constitution of 1819, characterized by strong centralism around Buenos Aires. The text didn't even aboard the subject of the method of election of the Director of State, but guaranteed him wide competencies, including the designation of the provincial governments and the heads of the national administration.

The congress also ordered San Martín and Manuel Belgrano to return to the capital with their armies, to defend the authority of the Directory. Both generals refused to follow those orders. San Martín held his troops in Rancagua (present Chile) and dictated the Act of Rancagua, for which he ignored the authority of the Directory after such orders. Belgrano behaved differently, making a pact with the federal forces of José Gervasio Artigas and he and his Northern Army had put themselves under the orders of the governor of Córdoba. The tension was finally broken at the Battle of Cepeda of 1820 when the united tropes of the provinces defeated the Director José Rondeau. As a result, the Treaty of Pilar was signed, establishing a federally organized government in which Buenos Aires would be one of the 13 provinces.

Even though defeated in combat, the Unitarian idealism was kept vigorous in Buenos Aires. Bernardino Rivadavia, Minister of Governor Martín Rodríguez, redesigned the project of the constitution of 1819 in more republican terms: The Argentine Constitution of 1826 was approved by the legislature of Buenos Aires on September 1, 1826, but rejected by the rest of the provinces. The following years represented the temporal decline of the Unitarian and the rise of provincial Caudillos. They saw in the project of the constitution an administrative option to displace the Buenos Aires hegemony. The governors of Santiago del Estero, Córdoba and La Rioja, (Mariano Fragueiro, Juan Felipe Ibarra and Facundo Quiroga, respectively), at the beginning of the 1830, urged to create a representative assembly. This new assembly was to be directed by Quiroga, who even used the writings of the young author of Bases, Juan Bautista Alberdi, for the 1853 constitution project.

The first attempt of consent was achieved with the Federal Pact of 1831, signed by Buenos Aires, Entre Ríos, and Santa Fe, to which the rest of the provinces would eventually subscribe. The main opposition to a constitutional assembly was from Buenos Aires, yet not from the literate citizens and Unitarian businessmen, but from the Buenos Aires caudillo Juan Manuel de Rosas, who claimed it was too soon to seal a constitution. The assassination of Quiroga in Barranca Yaco put an end to the initiative of the caudillos of the interior.

The Federal Pact stipulated the formation of a Representative Commission with the seat in the city of Santa Fe. Each of the subscribed provinces would send a delegate with certain powers of decision, such as war and peace declarations, and the selection of the heads of the battalions. Delegates would also add voice to the national subjects decided by the Federative Congress, such as the country's administration, internal and foreign bossiness, and the range of each province's independence.

Many points of the Federal Pact were never followed; though it is mentioned by the 1853 constitution as one of the pre-existent pacts, it was not in effect during the Rosas hegemony who insisted on the inadequacy of a premature constitution. This attitude became evident in 1847 when Alberdi, from exile, invited the members of the exiled intellectual ambient to collaborate with Rosas to intercede for the desired constitution. Rosas seemed to completely ignore the petition, but other federal caudillos, especially Justo José de Urquiza, paid attention to it.

=== The political landscape in 1853 ===
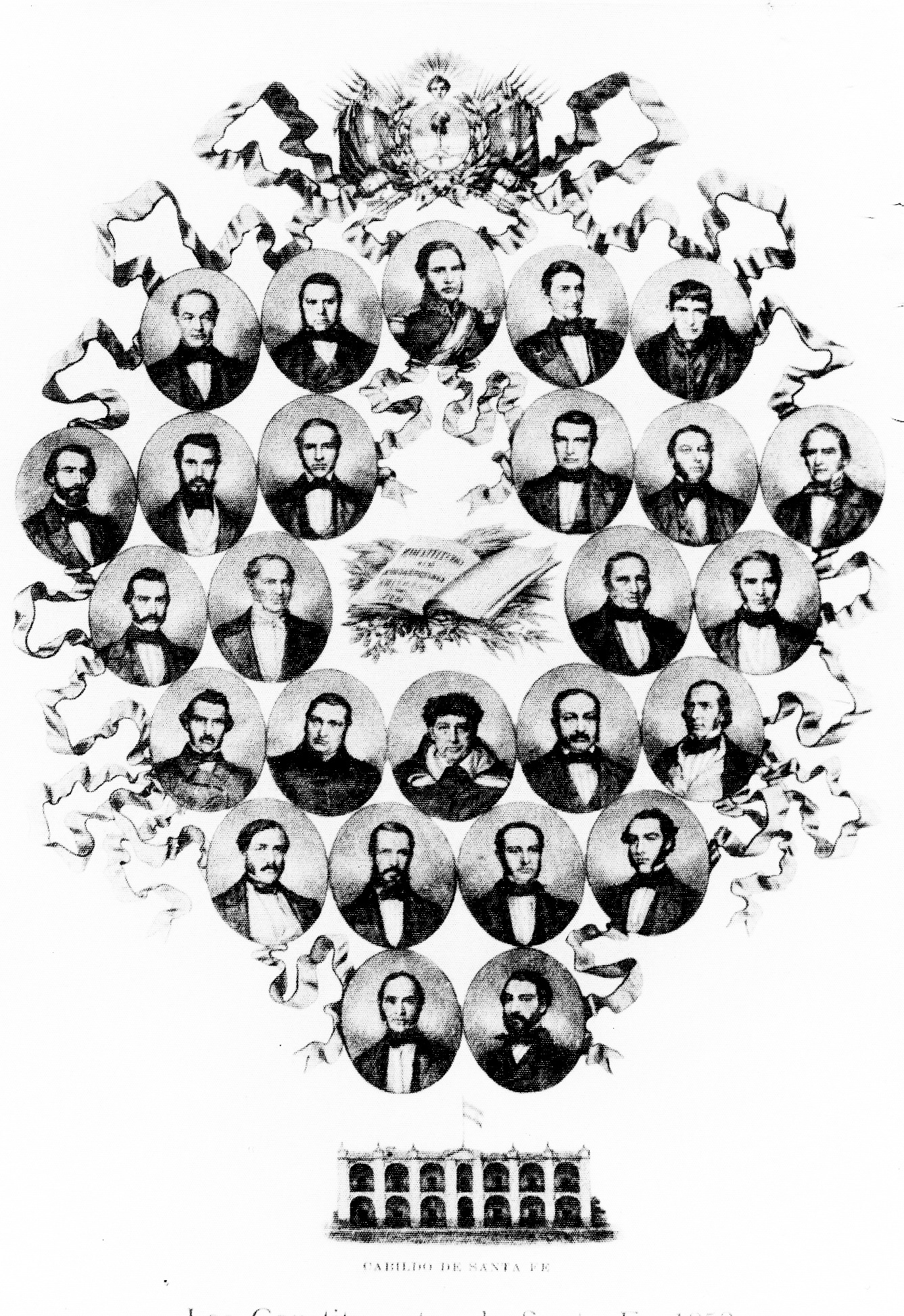
The representatives of the provinces, in the Constituent assembly for enactment of the Constitution, 1853

The 1853 constitution was elaborated immediately after the Battle of Caseros, which saw the defeat of Rosas, who held political control in Buenos Aires for two decades. The shift in the political landscape left Justo José de Urquiza in charge of the national business. On April 6, 1852, Urquiza had a meeting with governors Vicente López y Planes of Buenos Aires, Juan Pujol of Corrientes, and delegates of Santa Fe, where it was decided to call for a Constitutional Congress under the terms of the Federal Pact of 1831. The decision of opening the congress in August of the following year was communicated to the rest of the provinces.

Urquiza was aware of the strong opposition within the Buenos Aires elite to his mandate and any attempt of limiting the hegemony of the port city over the rest of the country. To calm that opposition, Urquiza gave Pujol and Santiago Derqui the assignment of elaborating a constitutional project that would be less harsh to the porteño interests. On May 5, he gathered with some of the most influential characters of Buenos Aires— among which were Dalmacio Vélez Sársfield, Valentín Alsina, Tomás Guido and Vicente Fidel López— to propose revival of the constitutional project of 1826 of Rivadavia, in exchange for support of his authority in front of the national government, but the project was rejected.

The definitive meeting with the provincial delegates took place in San Nicolás de los Arroyos on May 29. Deliberations lasted for two days before they signed the San Nicolás Agreement, which granted provisional Directorship of the Confederation to Urquiza, and set the opening of the constitutional convention for August, to which each province would send 2 representatives. The provinces that were directly represented were: Entre Ríos by Urquiza; Buenos Aires by López y Planes; Corrientes by Benjamín Virasoro; Santa Fe by Domingo Crespo; Mendoza by Pascual Segura; San Juan by Nazario Benavides; San Luis by Pablo Lucero; Santiago del Estero by Manuel Taboada; Tucumán by Celedonio Gutiérrez; and La Rioja by Vicente Bustos. The treaty was also adhered to by Catamarca, who also designated Urquiza as its representative, and Córdoba, Salta and Jujuy, who would ratify it later.

The Buenos Aires opposition reacted quickly. Alsina, Bartolomé Mitre, Vélez Sársfield and Ireneo Portela confronted López y Planes, who they considered had ideals too close to those of Urquiza. They denounced López y Planes' vote as having no validity and affirmed he had no attributions to sign it in name of the Buenos Aires government, and they argued the treaty jeopardized the rights of the province while giving despotic attributions to Urquiza. The following debates, known as the Jornadas de Junio, concluded with the resignation of López y Planes on June 2, 1852. The legislature elected Manuel Pinto to replace him, but Urquiza made use of the attributions given to him by the treaty to call a federal intervention that dissolved the provincial legislature and reestablished López y Planes at its head. When López y Planes resigned for the second time, Urquiza assumed the government of the province himself, naming a state council of 15 members as deliberating organ.

Urquiza personally controlled the government of the province until September, when he left to Santa Fe for the constitutional convention together with elected deputies Salvador María del Carril and Eduardo Lahitte, leaving General José Miguel Galán as provisional governor.

Three days later, on September 11, Mitre, Alsina, and Lorenzo Torres revolted against Galán's forces and restored the legislature. On September 22 they would revoke their adhesion to the treaty, and rejected the authority of Urquiza. They also sent José María Paz to extend the revolt to the provinces of the interior, who did not succeed, but they acquired certain support that prevented Urquiza from directly attacking the revolt, and forced him to negotiate with the revolters, sending Federico Báez to Buenos Aires for that purpose.

Buenos Aires recalled its deputies from the Constitutional Assembly and incited the other provinces to do the same. They received a negative response from the governments of the other provinces to cancel the assembly, and so Alsina and Mitre attempted to weaken Urquiza's position and power. They sent forces to attack the provinces of Entre Ríos, Santa Fe, and Córdoba. On November 21 an army under the command of Juan Madariaga attempted to take over the city of Concepción del Uruguay, but was repelled by the forces of Ricardo López Jordán, who quickly informed Urquiza of the situation. Also, Paz could not advance over Santa Fe, and Mitre didn't succeed in convincing Corrientes governor Pujol to attack Entre Ríos, for Pujol joined Urquiza.

Without the representatives of Buenos Aires but with the support of all the other provinces, the Constitutional Convention started its sessions in November 1852. The convention, which was held in Santa Fe followed the precedent set by the 1787 Philadelphia Constitution.

== Constitutional delegates ==
The San Nicolás Agreement established equal representation for all provinces of the Confederation, with two delegates for each. This was one of the points of rupture with Buenos Aires, the most populated of all the provinces, which hadbsought representation proportional to population. Proportional representation would have granted Buenos Aires 18 delegates, a near majority.

The differences between provinces resulted in diverse delegates. Many did not have education in law but rather military, religious, or literary experience. Some of them had also been in exile during the government of Rosas, while others were politically active in that period. These differences would translate into discrepancies, such as the religious posture of the Constitution, and the problem of the Buenos Aires hegemony.

After Salvador María del Carril and Eduardo Lahitte left, the assembly as ordered by the Buenos Aires government installed after the revolt the members of the Constitutional Convention were:

Name	Representing	Province of birth	Profession
Juan del Campillo	Córdoba	Córdoba	Lawyer
Pedro Alejandrino Centeno	Catamarca	Catamarca	Priest
José de la Quintana	Jujuy	Jujuy	
Salvador María del Carril	San Juan	San Juan	
Agustín Delgado	Mendoza	Mendoza	
Santiago Derqui	Córdoba	Córdoba	Lawyer
Pedro Díaz Colodrero	Corrientes	Corrientes	
Pedro Ferré	Catamarca	Corrientes	Military (Brigadier General)
Ruperto Godoy	San Juan	San Juan	Merchant
José Benjamín Gorostiaga	Santiago del Estero	Santiago del Estero	Lawyer
Juan María Gutiérrez	Entre Ríos	Buenos Aires	
Delfín B. Huergo	San Luis	Salta	Lawyer
Benjamín J. Lavaysse	Santiago del Estero	Santiago del Estero	Priest
Manuel Leiva	Santa Fe	Santa Fe	
Juan Llerena	San Luis	San Luis	Lawyer
Regis Martínez	La Rioja	Córdoba	Lawyer
Manuel Padilla	Jujuy	Jujuy	Lawyer
José Manuel Pérez	Tucumán	Tucumán	Friar
Juan Francisco Seguí	Santa Fe	Santa Fe	Lawyer
Luciano Torrent	Corrientes	Corrientes	Lawyer and Medic
Martín Zapata	Mendoza	Mendoza	Lawyer
Salustiano Zavalía	Tucumán	Tucumán	Lawyer
Facundo de Zuviría	Salta	Salta	Doctor in Law

Some of the delegates were not native to the provinces they represented, and others had not resided in them for a long time, which the opposition of Buenos Aires exploited, calling them alquilones (rentals).

The historical revisionism in Argentina has emphasised this, suggesting that these congressmen were not completely representative of the provincial population, to which others point out that the selection of the delegates of all the provinces was not precisely popular, since it was composed of jurists and intellectuals, many of which had been in the exile for years during the government of Rosas.

The president of the convention was Zuviría, who received his doctorate in law at the National University of Córdoba and was a participant in the redaction of the first constitution of its province on August 9, 1821. Domingo Crespo, governor of Santa Fe, inaugurated the sessions on November 20, 1852, in the absence of Urquiza, who was fighting the Buenos Aires forces. Zuviría then pointed out the difficulties the convention would have to face, especially regarding the armed confrontation with Buenos Aires, and the lack of a constitutional background. To this, Santa Fe delegate Manuel Leiva asserted that it was imperious to move forward with celerity, before the urgency of a constitution. After a tense deliberation, Leiva's position prevailed.

== Elaboration of the Constitutional text ==
The commission in charge of the redaction for the project was composed of Leiva, Gutiérrez, Gorostiaga, Colodrero and Ferré.

Even though most provinces already had their own constitution which could have been used as a model, these were judged inconvenient for the national organization, for they followed a centralized model whereas the delegates wished to procure a federal organization.

The models to follow were the few available constitutions: the Constitution of the United States of 1787, the Spanish Constitution of 1812, the Constitution of Switzerland of 1832, the Chilean Federal Laws of 1826 and the Political Constitution of 1833, and the republican constitutions of France of 1793 and 1848, along with the work of Juan Bautista Alberdi. Exiled in Chile months before, Alberdi had sent a project of constitution to Juan María Gutiérrez, which adapted Rivadavia's Unitarian constitution of 1826 to the federal form but also kept several parts untouched.

Gutiérrez and Gorostiaga, as part of the Constitutional Business Commission, were in charge of the redaction of the fore-project. Gutiérrez had already part of it through correspondence with Alberdi, to whom he suggested to include the second edition of his Bases, a developed project, to facilitate the constitutional work. The main job was in Gorostiaga's hands, who worked on it from December 25 to mid-February. Gorostiaga consulted mainly the Unitarian constitution of 1826 from which he took the sections on individual guarantees, the composition of the legislative, and the competence of the executive power. He also consulted the Constitution of the United States, from a poor but only available translation of Venezuelan military man Manuel García de Sena, and the work of Alberdi.

Once finished the project found the resistance within the commission by Leiva, Díaz Colodrero and Ferré, particularly on the status of the Catholic Church within the state, and the position of the Buenos Aires city.

The composition of the commission, in charge of the redaction of the text, was not very representative of the entire assembly. It had to be modified in the session of February 23 to let the project move forward, though there was a delay of two months due to the political situation. On March 9 Ferré and Zuviría, who had been sent to negotiate with the revolved porteños, made a pact to reinstitute the deputies of Buenos Aires to the convention, with representation according to population. The negotiations though didn't finish positively, and after a long wait, the sessions were restarted on April 15 as requested by Urquiza, who pretended to have the full text by May.

The similarity of the constitutional text with that of the United States was not welcomed by all the congressmen; Zuviría read, at the inauguration of the sessions of April 20, a long speech against the indiscriminate application of foreign principles to a country whose organization, he said, was not habituated to it. He proposed instead to make a study of local institutions and use it as a base. Zuviría with Centeno, Díaz Colodrero and Friar Pérez, were the only ones to vote against the fore-project. The rest of the congressmen, either for ideologic reasons or for the political urgency of establishing a national constitution, decided to support the initiative of the commission; the text would be worked out in the following ten days.

The boycott started by the porteños revived an already traditional conflict between Buenos Aires and the other provinces, sharpened by the strong hand of Rosas who had governed the country favouring the porteños. One of the most controversial issues was the customs taxes, which with being Buenos Aires having the main deep-water port of the country, and the only one with active traffic of goods with Europe, were collected almost entirely in that city.

The negation of sharing those profits for the national finances had always been one of the main points of controversy between Urquiza and the oligarchy of Buenos Aires; at the same time, it confronted the interests of the businessmen of the city, supporters of a liberal commerce, and the artisans and small industries of the interior, who without any kind of protection or importations restrictions could not compete and develop.

Most of the constitutional delegates, especially Gorostiaga and Gutiérrez, urged to take measures in order to end the hegemony of the port city, federalizing the territory of the city of Buenos Aires, and separating it that way from the interests of the Buenos Aires Province. At the same time a moderate group, headed by Zuviría and Roque Gondra, considered such federalization wouldn't be convenient, for it would upset the porteños and void any attempt of negotiation to pacifically reincorporate it into the Confederation. The major fraction affirmed that the opportunity to expose their reasons had already been rejected when Buenos Aires withdrew its representatives, and that the constitutional will would not hesitate to take arms against the very capital of the country if it were necessary for the future country's welfare.

After arduous negotiations they arrived at a compromise solution, in which Buenos Aires was made capital by the 3rd article, but tied to a special law, approved together with the constitution, to facilitate a possible future modification. Nevertheless, the affirmation of the sovereignty of the Convention over the territories of Buenos Aires and Buenos Aires Province was made explicit in several articles, including the 3rd, 32nd, 34th, and 42nd. The 42nd article states the election of senators and deputies also for the capital (federal district), the 64th stipulated for the National Congress the exclusivity of the legislation in the territory of the federal capital, the 83rd conceded to the President of the Nation the control over the capital, and the 91st stated there the residence of the National Supreme Court. The law for a federal capital was finally approved with prescriptions for the case of being unable to immediately set the capital in Buenos Aires, as indeed happened.

Another problematic issue was the Freedom of religion, to which a group of a few, though influential, delegates firmly opposed, headed by Centeno, Pérez, and strongly supported by Zuviría, Leiva and Díaz Colodrero. The arguments ranged from theological-juridical, for which Centeno affirmed the freedom of cult to be a natural right, to the pragmatic-historical, with Díaz Colodrero and Ferré stating that the existence of other cults could irritate the people and foment the apparition of new caudillos that would predicate in opposition to the constitution.

On the contrary, those more influenced by Alberdi and the ideas of the Generation of 1837 pleaded for the freedom of cults, pointing out that it would encourage immigration to Argentina, simplify the relations with foreign nations, and that the conscience was not a matter of legislation but of public acts.

The liberal sector prevailed 13 against 5, but the argument was dragged down to the abolition of religious privilege statutes; the obligation of professing the Catholic religion for all the state functionaries; and the conversion of the Native Americans. Finally, it was decided that only the president had to be Catholic, a condition that was held until the constitutional reform of 1994.

== The constitution ==
The final text consisted of a preamble and 107 articles, organized in two parts: one on the rights of the inhabitants, and one on the organization of the government.

The preamble was destined to affirm the legitimation of the Constitution, synthesizing the legislative and political program of the conventional delegates. To clear doubts about their interests it reminded them that the dictate of the constitution followed the pre-existing pacts subscribed by the provincial authorities; affirmed the project of guaranteeing the unity and inner peace and the formation of a common front towards the rest of the world; it stated the objective of populating the territory mentioning all men in the world who wish to inhabit the Argentine land; and invoked God's authority in a form acceptable both to religious persons and to illustrated deists.

=== Declarations, Rights and Guaranties ===
The 31 articles of the first part, entitled Declaraciones, Derechos y Garantías, established the fundament of the political regime; it is in this section that the difference with the 1826 constitution is most visible. It formally introduced the division of powers of the republican system, the political representation and federalism; it set the establishment of a federal capital; the authority of each province to dictate its own constitution and their autonomy in internal issues except in cases of insurrection or foreign attack; the political, judicial and customs union of the country; and the fundamental rights of the citizens.

Following the dispositions of the Assembly of 1813 who decreed the Law of Wombs, the constitution abolished slavery and the nobility titles, setting the juridical equality. The protection of the law extended to all the inhabitants of the country, not only to the citizens, in order to foment immigration; article 20th expressed it implicitly, and the 25th declared the official promotion of immigration.

The rights expressly recognized were gathered mainly in the 14th article, which instituted the freedom of work, navigation, commerce, residence and traveling, press, association, cult, education, and petition to the authorities. Other articles also detailed the protection of private property, the inviolability of the domicile, person, and mail, and the total freedom on private matters.

Various declarations of the first part were directly related to the national finances, and with challenging the Buenos Aires naval predominance. The 4th article nationalized the customs taxes income, the 9th and 10th reserved to the federal government the charge of rights and eliminated internal customs, and the 11th, 12th and 26th declared the freedom of transit.

Article 29, finally, transmitted the constitutional dispositions of the recent history, forbidding the concession of the sum of public power to any functionary, which had allowed Rosas to reach and sustain his second government.

=== Organization of the government ===
According to the republican system, the 76 articles of the second part established the division of the government into three independent powers: the legislative, executive and judicial. Only the last 7 brief articles were dedicated to the organization of the provincial governments, as they were to settle their own internal organization dictated by their own constitution.

==== Legislative power ====
The 32nd to 63rd articles contain the dispositions related to the legislative power. Its head is the Argentine Congress composed of a Senate, integrated by representatives of the provinces and the capital; and a Chamber of Deputies, that directly represent the Argentine people.

In Alberdi's project was explicitly stated that each deputy would represent a political entity that had chosen him—the province or the capital—and not the people directly, but this part was not included in the final text of the 1853 constitution.

Senators would be elected equitably, two for each province and the capital, with a capacity of one vote each. The deputies, on the other hand, would be assigned proportionally to the number of inhabitants of the province or the capital, considered electoral districts for this matter. The constitution didn't recognize in any way the existence of political parties, though very much likely to occur at the verge of the country's political organizations.

The incompatibilities inside the exercise of the legislative function extended to the priesthood's regular functions— in view of the vote of obedience that links the clerics with their superiors— and the activity in the executive power, as a ministry or any other positions alike, unless with special authorization. The constitution expressly dictated that the legislative function should be remunerated.

To avoid the influence of the executive power in the legislative activity of the congress, the legislators were granted immunity from judicial interrogation on subjects connected to their activity, and couldn't be arrested unless In flagrante delicto; only the congress itself could revoke such privileges and allow the investigation to take its course by a competent judge.

Only the chambers themselves could make decisions on the election, rights and titles of their own members; they were to elaborate the internal regulations and sanction the misconducts of their members. For the sessions, it was required for the chambers to count with a minimum quorum of the absolute majority, though a session with a smaller number of members had the right to compel the presence of the absent. A wider majority was required for the constitutional and regulatory reforms. The chambers had the power to question the ministers of the executive power, convoking them to present at them.

Both chambers had self-initiative on legislatorial matters, with a few exceptions. The approval of projects had to take place separately in both chambers; corrections and amends by one of the chambers had to be taken back to the chamber of origin for new voting, while the rejection of the project by one of the chambers forced it to be filed for the rest of the year. Approved laws were given to the executive power for its promulgation; though they could be vetted by making use of its co-legislative power. Nevertheless, if less than two-thirds of the members of each chamber insisted on the approval of the law, the executive power had to forcefully promulgate it. At the redaction of the law, the phrase "The Senate and the Chamber of Deputies of the Confederation united in Congress sanction as law..." was forceful in the redaction of laws.

The ordinary sessions of the Congress gathered exceptionally in one single chamber called Legislative Assembly, took place from May 1 to September 30, and started with the presence of the president of the Nation. The preparatory sessions incorporate the elected members, while the prorogation sessions are called by the chamber itself or the president to finalize the unconcluded matter at the end of the ordinary cycle. The president can also call extraordinary sessions on an urgent matter during the period of recess.

===== Chamber of Deputies =====
The number of deputies was fixed to one per 20,000 inhabitants, or a fraction not smaller than 10,000; it was expressly authorized that these figures would be adjusted by the congress after each national census, though the relationship could only be incremented.

A transitory clause of the 34th article indicated a minimum of two deputies per province independent of its population; it assigned Buenos Aires city, Buenos Aires Province and Córdoba Province six deputies, four to the provinces of Corrientes and Santiago del Estero, three to Tucumán, Salta, Catamarca and Mendoza, and two to Santa Fe, San Juan, Entre Ríos, La Rioja Province, San Luis and Jujuy. Due to the absence of the representatives from Buenos Aires city until 1866, the chamber had only 38 deputies.

To qualify for the chamber, candidates had to be at least 25 years old and be Argentine citizens for at least four years. The clause demanding candidates to be born or stably reside in the province they represent wasn't added until the reform of 1860. De Ángelis's proposition of demanding candidates to practice a liberal profession or own lands was finally rejected.

The mandate of the deputies was to last for four years, with the possibility of reelection; the renovation of the chamber would take place by halves each 2 years; a transitory disposition set a casting of lots to choose the deputies that would have to leave their seats after two years in the first cycle of elections; what had to be repeated in other moments of the Argentine history, when the national congress was repeatedly dissolved by military governments during the 20th century.

The election of the deputies according to the constitution had to be done " by simple plurality of suffrages". The interpretation of this ambiguous phrase was a source of later disputes, but until 1912 predominated the doctrine that granted the party with the majority or first minority of votes designated the totality of the deputies for its legislative jurisdiction.

Later laws established a uninominal system of votes by circumscriptions, such as Law 4161/02 of "restricted suffrage"; the Law 8871/12 or Sáenz Peña Law for which the majority or first minority would have two-thirds of the seats, giving the rest to the following most voted party; the Law 14032/51 that again installed a uninominal system, and finally the proportional system of D'Hont.

The Chamber of Deputies had the exclusive power of initiative on laws regarding conscription and troupes recruiting, taxes, and would work as a prosecutor during impeachments against authorities of the three powers of the nations and the provincial governors, in which the Senate would act as the court. To approve a political trial, two-thirds of the chamber of deputies had to agree on the petition presented by one of its members.

===== The Senate =====
The election of the senators, and representatives of the provincial entities, corresponded to the legislatures created by the provincial governments, as well as that of the federal district of Buenos Aires city. The electoral process was similar to the one for the presidential election, through an electoral college composed of electors directly voted by the people. The duration of the senatorial mandate was fixed to nine years, with the possibility of unlimited reelections, renewing the chamber by thirds every 3 years. The Senate would hold two representatives of each province, regardless of its population; until 1860 26 senators from the 13 provinces excluding Buenos Aires Province and Buenos Aires City, comprised the chamber.

The requisites for the senatorial candidates were 30 years of age and six years of Argentine citizenship. The requisite of being born in, or resident of for at least 2 years, the electoral jurisdiction would be added in the 1860 constitutional reform. There was demanded an annual rent of 2,000 pesos fuertes, which some calculate to be equivalent to 3.3 kilograms of gold. It was an issue that became heavily discussed. Though it was finally approved, the lack of support and funds eventually led to its forgiveness. the presidency of the Senate corresponded to the vice-president of the Confederation, who could only vote in case of a tie.

This organization, in spite of the oligarchical characteristic of the minimal rent, differed greatly in the Unitarian project of 1819, that stipulated one senator per province and three for the Armed Forces, three for the Catholic Church, one for each university, and the former Supreme Directors of the Confederation after the finalisation of their mandates. It much closer resembled Alberdi's project of one senator per province with one substitute.

The Senate had exclusive competence in the initiatives of constitutional reform, and the judicial function during a political trial. Even though it didn't share with the president of the Nation faculties of foreign politics, as with the constitution of the United States from which the Argentine one was strongly inspired, the president needed the Senate's approval for declaring siege and for leaving the federal district. It was also to be consulted in the designation of the ministers of the Supreme Court and the Federal Tribunals, the national ministers, and the higher positions of the Armed Forces and the representatives to the Vatican.

===== Transitory exercise of the Legislative Power =====
The first laws created under the application of the constitution were not dictated by the Congress but by the constitutional convention itself, as empowered by the San Nicolás Agreement. Among those laws were that of the federalization of Buenos Aires, the customs taxes, the free navigability and the statute of haciendas.

==== The Executive Power ====
Articles 71 to 90 contained the stipulations related to the executive power. Its control would rely on one single person with the title of "President of the Argentine Confederation". It had also a vice-president elected together with the president, who would become the head of the power in case of absence, incompetence or resignation of the president.

The requisites for the candidates to the presidency were similar to those for the Senate, with the additional conditions of being native Argentine citizens or child of a native citizen, and practice of the Catholic religion. The presidential mandate would last six years without the possibility of reelection until a whole presidential period had taken place, and under no circumstances could the mandate extend for more than six years since the original assumption date of the position.

The procedure for the presidential election was indirect; the electorate of each province would choose a number of delegates equal to twice the number of deputies and senators that that province could choose. The electors of each province would give their discretional vote for the candidate of their preference and would send a stamped copy of the resolution of the provincial electoral assembly to the Senate. Once received all the lists, the national legislative assembly would immediately elect by the suffrage plurally between the two most votes candidates, or more in case of a tie between the second places. In case of not having a candidate with an absolute majority in the first instance, a ballotage would take place between the two most voted candidates. The quorum for this second election was three-quarters of the congressmen.

According to the first incise of the 90th article, the president was the supreme authority of the Confederation in what was called a presidential regime: the president need not answer for their actions to any superior authority, inside the mark given by the constitution, and did not require Congress approval for the exercise of the competent attributions. The president was also the chief of the Armed Forces, and head of the executive power of the city-designated federal capital of the nation.

The president also had co-legislative powers: besides the promulgation and sanction of laws dictated by the Congress, including the faculty of veto, the president was in charge of the expedition of appropriate regulations for the application of the law, called decrees, though respecting the spirit of originality of the law. The signature of treaties with other states was subscribed exclusively to the president, as well as the decision of following or not following the documents emitted by the Supreme Catholic Pontiff

With the authority in foreign politics, the president was in charge of naming the ambassadors and other ministers in charge of the negotiation with foreign institutions; the designation of the heads of the embassies required senatorial agreement —another sign of the influence of the constitution of the United States— but could decide the lower positions without the Senate's interference.

Therefore, the president was the authority in charge of the military business; able to command the Army, designate its officers — with agreement of the Senate for the higher ranks — call for parades, carte blanches, and declare war or siege in case of a foreign attack.

Regarding the judicial power, it was up to the president to designate the judges of the federal tribunals, but with the agreement of the Senate. The president had also the faculty of pardoning crimes convicted in federal jurisdiction, except in cases of political trial. The president didn't have the ability to impose convictions, but could decree —in case of siege— temporal arrest or imposed transfer of persons, unless these preferred to abandon the national territory. Without the consent of the Congress, these measures became void ten days after being dictated.

As responsible for the national administration, the president was in charge of the collection of the national rent and its distribution, within the mark of the law of national budget; the president had also the faculty to grant licenses, and to inquire on any matter of the national administration.

The constitution was established as five ministries, for which the president could elect its ministers. These ministries were Domestic Affairs, Foreign Relationships, Economy, Justice, Cult and Public Instruction (Education), and War and Navy. The ministerial referendum was necessary for the government decrees. Ministers were also obligated to give reports to the Congress at the opening of the sessions, of which they could also take part, though without the right of vote in order to avoid the incompatibility with the exercise of the legislative power.

==== Judicial Power ====
The organization of the judicial power is comprehended from articles 91 to 100. Given its short length, an important part of its definitions and form of organization was established by the legislative power in the sessions of the Congress, concerning most of the constitutional text to the organization and attributions of the National Supreme Court.

The judicial power was integrally under the control of the Supreme Court and the inferior tribunals for constitutional matters, related to federal laws, international treaties, or maritime jurisdiction. It was explicitly stated that the president could have no knowledge of the judicial whereabouts. Also to the federal tribunals the matters between actors of different provinces, that implied foreign diplomats, or those in which the government of a province or the Confederation itself took part. Matters involving diplomats, provinces or powers of the provincial governments were only competence of the Supreme Court.

The constitution stipulated the regulations for jury trials for the penal matters; yet the proceedings were never regulated, and its implementation remains pendant even in the current Argentine constitution, who still conserves this redaction.

The only crime that the Constitution details is that of treason against the Confederation, defined as "To take arms against the Confederation, or [...] join its enemies providing them help or assistance". The punishment was to be decided by the Congress, and it was prohibited to impose sanctions on any other than the perpetrator.

===== The Supreme Court =====
The Supreme Court of Justice was composed by a tribunal of 9 judges, and two prosecutors. Its seat would be in the federal capital. It was demanded for the head of the Ministry of Justice to be a lawyer with at least eight years of experience, as well as the requisites of the candidates to the Senate. The minister would take oath to the president of the court—exceptionally to the president of the Confederation at its conformation—and were unremovable except in cases of misconduct. The remuneration for the position would be set by law but could not be reduced while in functions. The Court would be in charge of the determination of its own regulations.

The Supreme Court defined by the Constitution of 1853 never became reality, even though Urquiza designated in 1854 its members, among which were Facundo Zuviría and Martín Zapata. After the reform of 1860, the number of its members was to be decided by Law of the Congress rather than being constitutionally fixed.

==== The government of the provinces ====
The last seven articles of the Constitution detail the regime of the provincial governments. Its organization was only tied to the stipulations of the provincial constitutions, independently of the federal government.

At the same time, they conserved all the attributions that the national constitution hadn't expressly given the federal government. Among these were the legislation on commerce and navigation; the customs' impositions or weight rights; emission of currency unless delegation of the central government; the establishment of civil, commerce, penal and mining codes; citizenship legislation; a gathering of war troupes; and the direct actuation with foreign states, including the Vatican.

War actions between provinces or between a province and the federal state were illegitimate, and such conflicts were to be solved by the Supreme Court of Justice. The provinces were expressly empowered to promote, within the federal legislation, the development of their own territories.

The resulting regime was markedly federal, and this was one of the main reasons that Buenos Aires refused to subscribe to it. The legislative porteños rejected being on the same level as, what they qualified mockingly, the thirteen huts (for the thirteen provinces). The incorporation of Buenos Aires to the Confederation required the suspension of the constitution and the resignation of the custom rights. This implied that for decades the president of the nation had to put up with the governor of Buenos Aires, who was the direct chief of the administration of the surrounding area and meant that the presidential power often faced a wall of bureaucracy.

The federalization of Buenos Aires didn't effectively take place until 1880, when the League of Governors, headed by Julio Argentino Roca, finally imposed it by the use of arms, against the porteño Bartolomé Mitre. Nevertheless, by that time the provincial oligarchies had already adopted a profile similar to that of their Unitarian counterparts, with the development of the model of agricultural exportations, and the formation of extensive Latifundios (large estates) that would control the national economy during the following five decades. The possibility of developing models of provincial powers different from that of Buenos Aires was gone, and with it the effective federalism of the constitution.

== The 1853 Constitution and Argentine political history ==
The 1853 constitution was a fundamental step towards Argentine unity. The events that followed gave it —as with all symbolically foundational moments— an importance that does not necessarily correspond with the actual impact it had at that time. It was, after all, rejected by Buenos Aires, and questioned by some of the most traditionalist constitutional delegates. Regardless, constitutional delegates were aware of its impact. Facundo Zuviría, in his speech following the original declaration, said "You have just exercised the most grave, most solemn, most sublime act that is given to a man in his moral life".

The biggest prize fell on Domingo Faustino Sarmiento and his contemporaries, who saw in the adoption of federalism a victory of their liberal principles. When the historical revisionism —criticising the devastation of the national industry, the flourishing of large estates, and the internal colonialism resulting from the liberal politic of the Generation of '80— revised the origins of constitutional text, it referred to the same general criteria idea but in an inverse sense. Sarmiento and Roca describe the constitution as a means to modernise the country through free commerce, European immigration, the abolition of provincial political leadership, and the dislocation of the traditional cultures inherited from Spain and adapted during centuries to the local peculiarities.

On the other hand, revisionists see in that constitution the means of destruction of the national Argentine identity due to; the destruction of the national industry by the introduction of foreign companies, merchants and investors; the displacement of populations from their own lands and way of life by waves of immigrants and the consequent social and economic turbulence; and the restriction of political representation to the literate and mercantile bourgeois.

Both alternatives adopt the same structure, exposed with magistral rhetoric in Sarmiento's exhortation Civilization or Barbarism. The revisionists didn't just revise history limited to the barbarian character of Sarmiento's civilization. That being a civilization that was founded from; the displacement of the aboriginals, the massive sacrifice of gauchos and morenos conscripted for the successive wars of the Triple Alliance and the Conquest of the Desert, the brutal accumulation of lands for the formation of latifundios or large estates for agricultural export, and the destruction of the emerging national industry and the systematic electoral fraud.

Historian José María Rosa pointed out the linguistic game of the lemma:

Civilisation —related to our city—, was understood in an opposite sense: as of the foreigners; whereas Barbarism —from the Barbarians, that is foreigners— signified, in the liberal language, the Argentine in contraposition to the European.

J. M. Rosa, Análisis de la dependencia argentina, IV:36

Later authors, some of them close to revisionism, have nevertheless pointed out that by accepting the opposition of its general terms, revisionism lost the opportunity to re-evaluate the opposition on which it is based: the liberal porteño bourgeoises and that of the provincial capitals on one side, and the semi-literate rural population on the other. The Unitarian Doctors —Rivadavia, Echeverría, Alberdi— would represent the first option, of whose plumes would flow the constitution; the federal caudillos —Quiroga, Güemes, Rosas— the second, reluctant to fix once and for all the political bonds.

For these authors, the alternative reflects one of the clashes effectively existent in the Argentine politics of that time: between the illustrated classes, based on the principles of the theoretic right of the millenary European tradition; and the pragmatic provincial leaders, men of action rather than theory. Given the intellectual ambient of the moment, in which the ideologists of the French revolutionaries had given place to the illumining positivism, it was natural that the thought of the first inclined for the defence of the liberal order, in which the abolition of the historical and traditional limits gave in for a new era of cooperation between people. The free market would give way to a specialisation of the countries in their areas of comparative advantage, resulting in the common improvement.

The interpretation that the revisionists make of this posture in terms of direct personal interest — the illustrated bourgeois was at the same time holder of the porteño commercial capital, that directly benefited from the importation of goods; in several instances the visible hand of foreign business interests influenced the invisible hand of the free market, offering support both economic and social to political elements which would be more amenable to their economic interests. The Marxist interpretations—that even though centred on explaining the logic of the event that took place rather than the individualities, haven't ignored this criterion— also leave several aspects unattended.

To understand the fractions that converged in the dictation of the 1853 constitution, two aspects have been distinguished that the conventional historiography has simplified in the dichotomy between Federals and Unitarians. On the one hand, the high-class had several fractions in unstable equilibrium: the commercial bourgeois of the port, the cattle bourgeois of the Littoral Mesopotamia, the small bourgeois layers of the cities of the landlocked provinces; and on the other hand, to understand the process of economical and cultural world integration —since by then, 150 years before the common use of the word, the state problem had already the view of globalisation in virtue of the expansion of the world market in the European economical potencies— did not necessarily imply, as it did in the Argentine history, the complete abandonment of the national production, and therefore of the country's modernisation would have been taken place without the loss of the national identity. Even if the ideals of the 1853 constitution, and Alberdi's writings that served as its base, depended in great part on the project of integrating Argentina into the world processes, the compromise with the economic liberalism was not necessarily coded in them.

The expressed objective of the constitutional project, as that of the political projects exposed shortly before and after, was that of modernising the nation; which in an emerging state, meant little more than creating it. An important part of the national thinkers considered that the project of modernisation imposed an almost total rupture with the Spanish colonial past; since Esteban Echeverría to Sarmiento and the Generación del '80, the search for the Argentine insertion in the modern world was based on the importation of theories, practices and even people. Such a rupture demanded certain kinds of conditions and dispositions; the complementation of the European markets would benefit the merchants of the port and the higher classes, capable of consuming material and symbolic luxury goods that this commerce provided, but affecting the rural and lower classes, which were displaced from the productive system in which they were situated. Aware of this, the leaders most opposed to Rivadavia's program concealed the task of formation of the state as a 'restoration' of the state that Rivadavia's reforms had broken: therefore, Rosas's title of "Restaurateur of Laws" that referred not to the Positive laws of the Right of Indias, but to the Natural law of the traditional nationals. The problem of this view was the impossibility, for a long time in Rosas' period, of effectively developing the national state. The restoration of the order, that in previous years had dissolved in the successive confrontations between the caudillos and the hegemony of the new Buenos Aires metropolis, resulted in a paralyzing of the process of building a state. When the sanction of the constitution broke that phase, and searching to introduce the new governmental system, the matter returned with all sharpness.

Alberdi, usually considered liberal by revisionists and therefore an enemy of the country's interests, harshly criticized Urquiza from his exile, who left the national structure in the hands of the porteños, and of Mitre, who used in the years of the police war against the provinces and in this action the achieved triumph of extreme liberalism of the capital over the integrationist federalism of the provinces of the littoral.

Mitre's politic would eliminate the possibility of resistance from the provinces, making impossible Alberdi's, Andrade's and José Hernández's attempts to guarantee the union. When under Julio Argentino Roca's government a unified Argentina became a reality, it was at the expense of the disappearing of the social layout of the provinces and their productive capacity. The federal shape of the constitution was, during the years of modern Argentina, a simple coalition of the illustrated classes throughout the country. It would not be until immigration produced its effects and mobilized the masses against the oligarchy that this order would be altered.
