= Pascual Echagüe =

Argentine soldier and politician

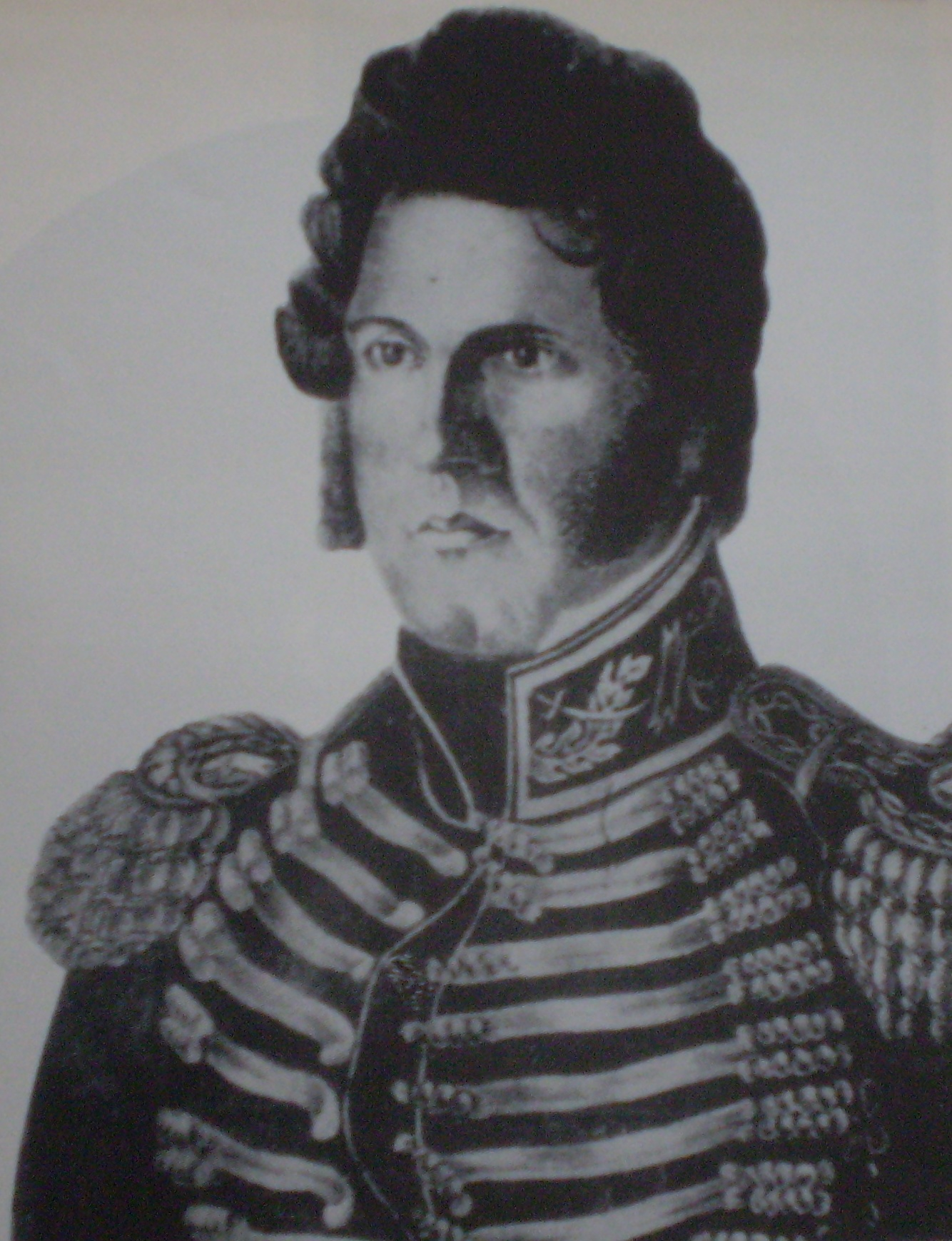

15th Governor of Santa Fe
- In office July 1845 – December 22, 1851
- Preceded by: Juan Pablo López
- Succeeded by: Domingo Crespo

13th Governor of Santa Fe
- In office 16 April 1842 – June 1845
- Preceded by: Juan Pablo López
- Succeeded by: Juan Pablo López

Governor of Entre Ríos
- In office 1 March 1832 – 31 December 1841
- Preceded by: Toribio Ortiz
- Succeeded by: Vicente Zapata

Personal details
- Born: 1797 Santa Fe, Argentina, Viceroyalty of the Rio de la Plata
- Died: 1867 (aged 69-70) Santa Fe, Argentina
- Party: Federalist Party (Argentina)

Pascual Echagüe (16 May 1797 – 2 June 1867) was an Argentine soldier and politician. He served as Governor of Entre Ríos and Santa Fe provinces and Minister of War and Navy during the governments of Urquiza and Derqui. He participated in the Argentine Civil Wars and the Uruguayan Civil War.

== Minister in Santa Fe ==
Echagüe was born in Santa Fe in 1797 and received a doctorate in theology in 1818 from the National University of Córdoba. He was a teacher for a short time, later secretary and afterward provincial minister to Governor Estanislao López. He represented his province at the signing of the treaties with Entre Ríos (1823), and at the Pacto Federal in January 1831.

He served several times as interim governor, and joined the army with the honorary rank of lieutenant colonel. He took part in the 1829 campaign against the Unitarian Juan Lavalle, fighting at the Battle of Márquez Bridge. He went with the army against Córdoba Province, and was in charge of the negotiations for the surrender of the provincial capital after the imprisonment of general José María Paz, being influential on the good treatment given to the captives.

Echagüe went officially to Entre Ríos Province, where he owned property, in December 1831, sent by López to obtain peace in the province. He defeated an obscure soldier who had named himself governor and was elected governor on 22 February 1832.

== Entre Ríos Governor ==
His administration started a period of progress and peace, with good relations with the Buenos Aires provincial governor, Juan Manuel de Rosas. During this period, Echagüe was promoted to general and re-elected twice to the post. He promoted Urquiza to colonel and commander of the Uruguay River's coastal forces. He founded the towns of La Paz and Diamante.

Peace in his province was threatened by Fructuoso Rivera's revolt against Manuel Oribe, the Uruguayan president. Rivera was defeated in June 1838, and Echagüe confiscated the possessions of the Entre Ríos citizens who had supported Rivera. Later on, he attacked the capital city of Corrientes, where the governor Genaro Berón de Astrada had rebelled against Rosas and had allied himself with Rivera. Echagüe defeated him at Pago Largo, and as a result more than one thousand enemy soldiers were killed, among them Berón de Astrada.

With the support of Juan Antonio Lavalleja and the members of the White Party, he crossed the Uruguay River in order to attack Rivera, but the latter defeated him at the Battle of Cagancha, on 29 December 1839, in San José Department, Uruguay near the Cagancha creek.

He returned later on to invade Corrientes Province, but general Paz defeated him decisively on 28 November 1841, at the Battle of Caaguazú. The Entre Ríos cavalry could not maneuver and was almost completely lost. Echagüe quit his post as governor and took refuge in Buenos Aires. Urquiza was named governor as his replacement.

== Governor of Santa Fe ==
Echagüe went with Oribe in his campaign to Santa Fe Province at the end of 1841. After the defeat of Juan Pablo López, Echagüe was elected Governor on 16 April 1842. He conducted a progressive and orderly government, as he had done in Entre Ríos, fomenting education in both provinces, in a time when this endeavor was given little though by the governing bodies.

In June 1845, López invaded Echagüe's province from Chaco, and occupied the capital city for a month, but Echagüe counter-attacked and defeated him, with Buenos Aires' support at Malabrigo. the rest of his term as Governor was a period of peace and stability.

When Urquiza declared himself to be against Rosas in 1851, and declared war, Echagüe was en route from Entre Ríos to Buenos Aires, and was attacked in December 1851. Echagüe and colonel Martín Santa Coloma reached Buenos Aires, while Domingo Crespo was named governor.

== Final years ==
After a short period, when it is not known where he lived – there are several versions that he might have travelled to Europe along with Rosas, and that both of them had met with Pope Pius IX – he took refuge in Montevideo. In 1854 he went to Entre Ríos, where he lived with a special permit from President Urquiza, who in 1856 named him Minister of War. Echagüe then organized a campaign against the native tribes in the Southern Chaco region.

From 1859 he was a national Senator, and that same year, federal Interventor in Mendoza Province, from 16 April until 23 August.

Echagüe represented La Rioja Province at the Constitutional Convention of 1860. Served as interim Minister of War during the administration of President Santiago Derqui and retired to Entre Ríos after the Battle of Pavón.

He volunteered for the Paraguayan War against Paraguay; but due to his advanced age he was rejected.

He died in Entre Ríos at the "San Gabriel" ranch, owned by his wife, Manuela Puig de Echagüe.

== Bibliography ==
- Gianello, Leoncio (1986). Historia de Santa Fe. Buenos Aires: Plus Ultra.
- Bosch, Beatriz (1991). Historia de Entre Ríos. Buenos Aires: Plus Ultra.
- Zinny, José Antonio (1987). Historia de los gobernadores de las Provincias Argentinas. Buenos Aires: Hyspamérica.
- Martínez, Benjamín (1932). Generales de Urquiza, desfile de valientes. Buenos Aires: Tor.
