= San Nicolás Agreement =

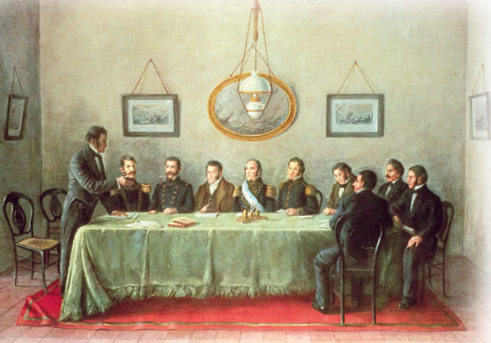
- Date: May 31, 1852
- Location: San Nicolás de los Arroyos
- Also known as: Acuerdo de San Nicolás
- Participants: Argentine provinces of Entre Ríos, Corrientes, Santa Fe, Mendoza, San Juan, San Luis, Santiago Del Estero, Tucuman, La Rioja
- Outcome: Call for the 1853 Constituent Assembly. Secession of Buenos Aires from the Argentine Confederation.

The San Nicolás Agreement (Spanish: Acuerdo de San Nicolás) was a pact signed on May 31, 1852, and subscribed by all but one of the 14 provinces of the United Provinces of the River Plate (the exception was Buenos Aires). The treaty consisted of 19 articles, and its goal was to set the bases for the national organization of the young Argentine state. It also served as precedent to the sanction of the Argentine Constitution of 1853.

The agreement named Justo José de Urquiza as provisional Supreme Director of the Argentine Confederation, established the application of the Pact of 1831, and set the gathering for a General Constitutional Congress in the city of Santa Fe.

== Background ==
On 6 April 1852 the Protocol of Palermo was signed after a meeting between the governors of Buenos Aires and Corrientes, and the representatives of Santa Fe and Entre Ríos. The protocol named Justo José de Urquiza in charge of the foreign relationships of the republic as long as the National Congress did not decide who would take the position.

Two days after, Urquiza invited the governor of the provinces to a meeting that would take place on May 20 in San Nicolás de los Arroyos, Buenos Aires.

== Deliberations and signature of the pact ==
On May 29 began the deliberations to determine the bases of the national organization. The Acuerdo de San Nicolás was signed on May 31, and consisted of 19 dispositional articles and an additional one.

The representatives of the different provinces that adhered to the Pact were Justo José de Urquiza (Entre Ríos), Benjamín Virasoro (Corrientes), Domingo Crespo (Santa Fe), Pascual Segura (Mendoza), Nazario Benavides (San Juan), Pablo Lucero (San Luis), Manuel Taboada (Santiago del Estero), Celedonio Gutiérrez (Tucumán) and Vicente Bustos (La Rioja). Catamarca designated Urquiza as its representative.

The provinces of Salta, Jujuy and Córdoba signed their adhesion later. Buenos Aires, whose representative was Vicente López y Planes, did not ratify the agreement.

== Dispositions of the agreement ==
In the first article, of a total of 19 in the agreement, the Federal Pact signed on January 4, 1831, was declared Fundamental Law of the Republic, and had to be followed and put in execution by the Responsible of Foreign Relationships of the Nation.

Articles 4 and 5 refer to the General Constituent Congress that was to start on August of the following year, with the previous election of the deputies that would take part in it. The rules established by the Electoral Law would be used to select the deputies of the provincial legislatures. All provinces were declared equal in rights, with two representative deputies for each province.

Articles 6 and 7 mention that the Congress would sanction the National Constitution, consent by the majority of the suffrages, putting the national interest above that of the provinces.

Article 8 declares that the deputies could not be judged for their opinions, not accused under any motive nor authority until the sanction of the constitution, though the provinces could withdraw their own deputies and replace them if considered opportune.

According to Article 11, the Congress would take place in the city of Santa Fe.

Article 15 granted executive attributions to Urquiza, and named him Provisional Director of the Argentine Confederation.

The additional article invited the provinces that did not sign the agreement to adhere to it through the provisional Director of the Confederation.

== Buenos Aires' rejection ==
Buenos Aires rejected the project mainly because of the consequences of articles 5, 11, 15, 18 and 19. It refused to the provinces to have the same number of deputies and that the congress had seat in Santa Fe, since it could not control it nor impose an almost majority for its own benefit, and the idea of Urquiza, merely a provincial caudillo, assuming as Supreme Director of the Confederation. It also refused to share the foreign commerce tax collection of the port for the federal government.

== Consequences of the agreement ==
The most relevant consequences of the agreement were two. First the sanction on May 1 of the Argentine Constitution of 1853, that was placed in force in the Argentine Confederation, and who in 1854 saw Justo José de Urquiza assuming as the first elected president of the Republic, for a period of 6 years.

The second was the separation of the Buenos Aires Province from the rest of the Confederation until 1859, after Urquiza military defeated Bartolomé Mitre at the Battle of Cepeda.

== See also ==
- Argentine Confederation
- Pacto Federal
- Argentine Constitution of 1853
- Battle of Caseros
