= Pedro Pascual Segura =

Argentine soldier and politician

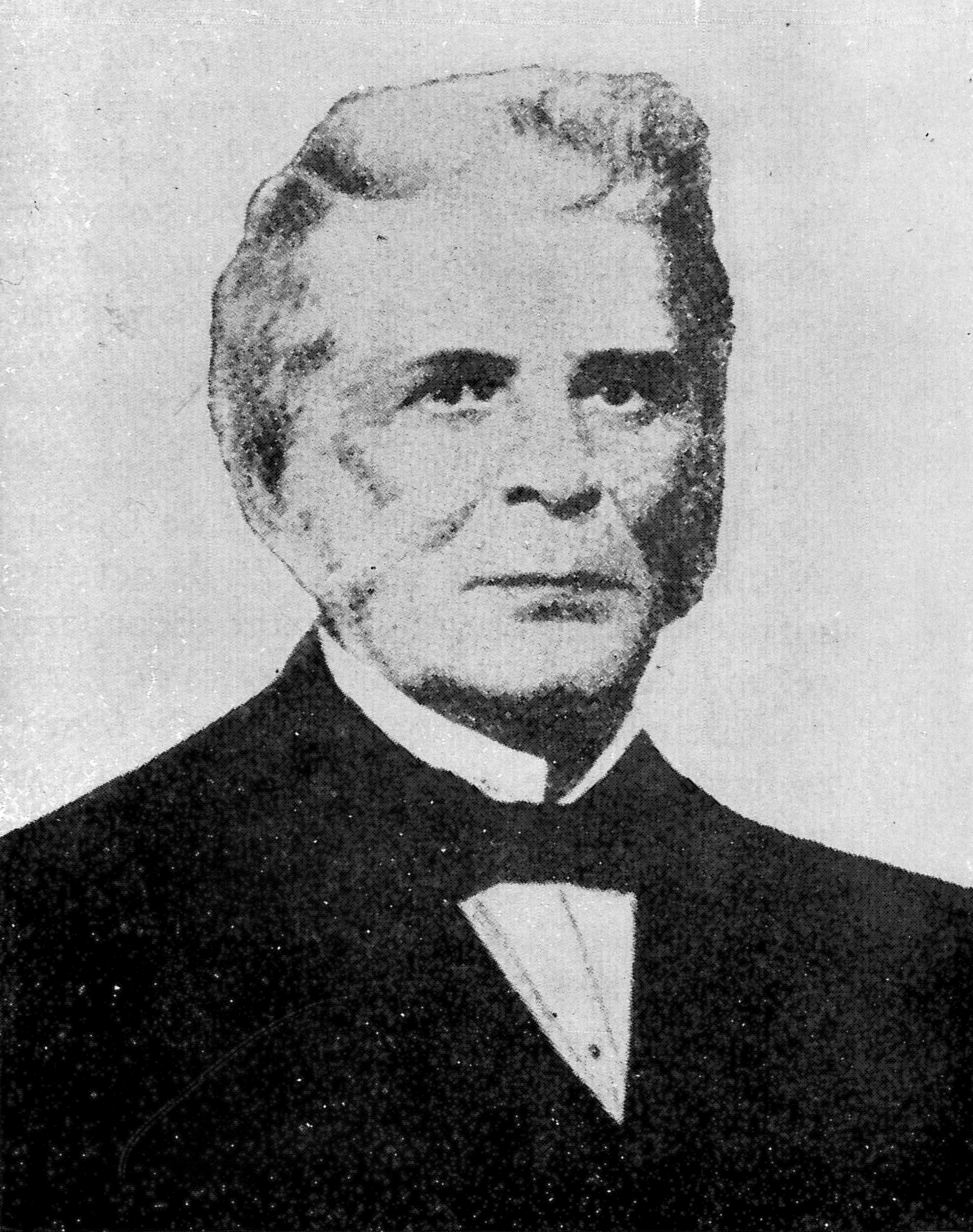
- Portrait of Pedro Pascual Segura

Governor of Mendoza Province
- In office 10 February 1845 – 4 April 1847
- Preceded by: Celedonio de la Cuesta
- Succeeded by: Alejo Mallea

Governor of Mendoza Province
- In office 3 March 1852 – 22 February 1856
- Preceded by: Alejo Mallea
- Succeeded by: Juan Cornelio Moyano

Governor of Mendoza Province (acting)
- In office 29 November 1864 – 15 February 1865
- Preceded by: Carlos González
- Succeeded by: Carlos González

Personal details
- Born: 1802 Mendoza
- Died: 1865 (aged 62–63) Mendoza

Pedro Pascual Segura (1802–1865) was an Argentine soldier and politician who served as Governor of Mendoza Province three times.

== Early years ==
Pedro Pascual Segura Corvalán was born in Mendoza in 1802. In his youth he was winemaker and farmer. In 1824 he hosted Canon Giovanni Maria Mastai Ferretti, the papal envoy, at his home. Years later, Ferretti would be Pope Pius IX.

At the outbreak of civil war in 1829 Segura was appointed an officer in the militia. He also participated in the war against the Northern Coalition in 1841. He was promoted to the rank of lieutenant colonel in 1841 after participating in the Battle of Rodeo del Medio. He was a relative of the caudillo and Governor of Mendoza Province, José Félix Aldao. When Aldao died, on 10 February 1845, Segura was elected to succeed him as governor.

== Governor of Mendoza ==
=== First term ===
A rancher and soldier, educated and with a firm character, Segura brought order to the province after the pointless cruelties that Aldao had inflicted. He allowed some of the Unitarians to return to the province. During his tenure as governor, Segura had a conflict with the government of Chile. He asked for assistance from Juan Manuel de Rosas, governor of Buenos Aires province and effective ruler of the Argentina Confederation.

In 1847 Segura wrote to the Pope asking him to erect a diocese in his province, which at that time depended on the diocese of San Juan. For that reason, Dr. Bernardo de Irigoyen, Argentina's ambassador to Chile, who was residing in Mendoza, organized a coup by which Segura was deposed on 4 April 1847 and replaced by an obscure local commander, Alejo Mallea. Segura retired to a ranch on the outskirts of Mendoza and was not disturbed.

=== Second term ===
When news of the Battle of Caseros (3 February 1852) reached Mendoza, the legislature decided that Mallea was too closely identified with the defeated Rosas, so they deposed him. Instead they elected Segura. It is clear from the official documents that he considered this was a continuation of his first governorship. He took office on 3 March 1852, and refused to take the oath of office, as he felt that his former oath still applied. Segura signed the San Nicolás Agreement on 31 May 1852, which established the Argentine Confederation with all the provinces of modern Argentina apart from Buenos Aires Province. Soon after the legislature promoted him to the rank of General.

Segura carried out a moderate government, and prohibited the use of party symbols. He officially adopted the national flag as the only one that should be used the province. He helped to restore General Nazario Benavídez as governor of the neighboring government of San Juan after he had been deposed in a coup. Segura authorized use of Chilean copper coins, established a new state printing shop and swore to observe the Constitution of Argentina of 1853. He made numerous visits to the interior of the province. He founded schools and colleges, courts, prison and other institutions. He sanctioned the first provincial constitution.

At the end of 1855 Segura resigned his government, calling elections. On 22 February 1856 he handed over power to his successor, Juan Cornelio Moyano.

== Later career ==
Segura moved to Paraná, Entre Ríos, the capital of the Argentina Confederacy, where he gave military and diplomatic service to presidents Justo José de Urquiza and Santiago Derqui. He returned to his province to help after the earthquake in March 1861. During the crisis that culminated in the Battle of Pavón and the invasion of the interior by forces from Buenos Aires, he remained aloof from politics. He was government minister of Governor Luis Molina, and afterwards of Governor Carlos González. When González asked for leave to take care of business, Segura replaced him temporarily from 29 November 1864 until February 1865. Segura died in mid-1865.
