= Argentine Confederation =

1831–1861 republic in South America

Coordinates: 31°43′56″S 60°31′43″W

Argentine Confederation Confederación Argentina (Spanish)
- 1831–1861
- Flag (1836–1852) Coat of arms
- Motto: En unión y libertad (Spanish) "In Unity and Freedom"
- Anthem: Himno Nacional Argentino (Spanish) "Argentine National Anthem"
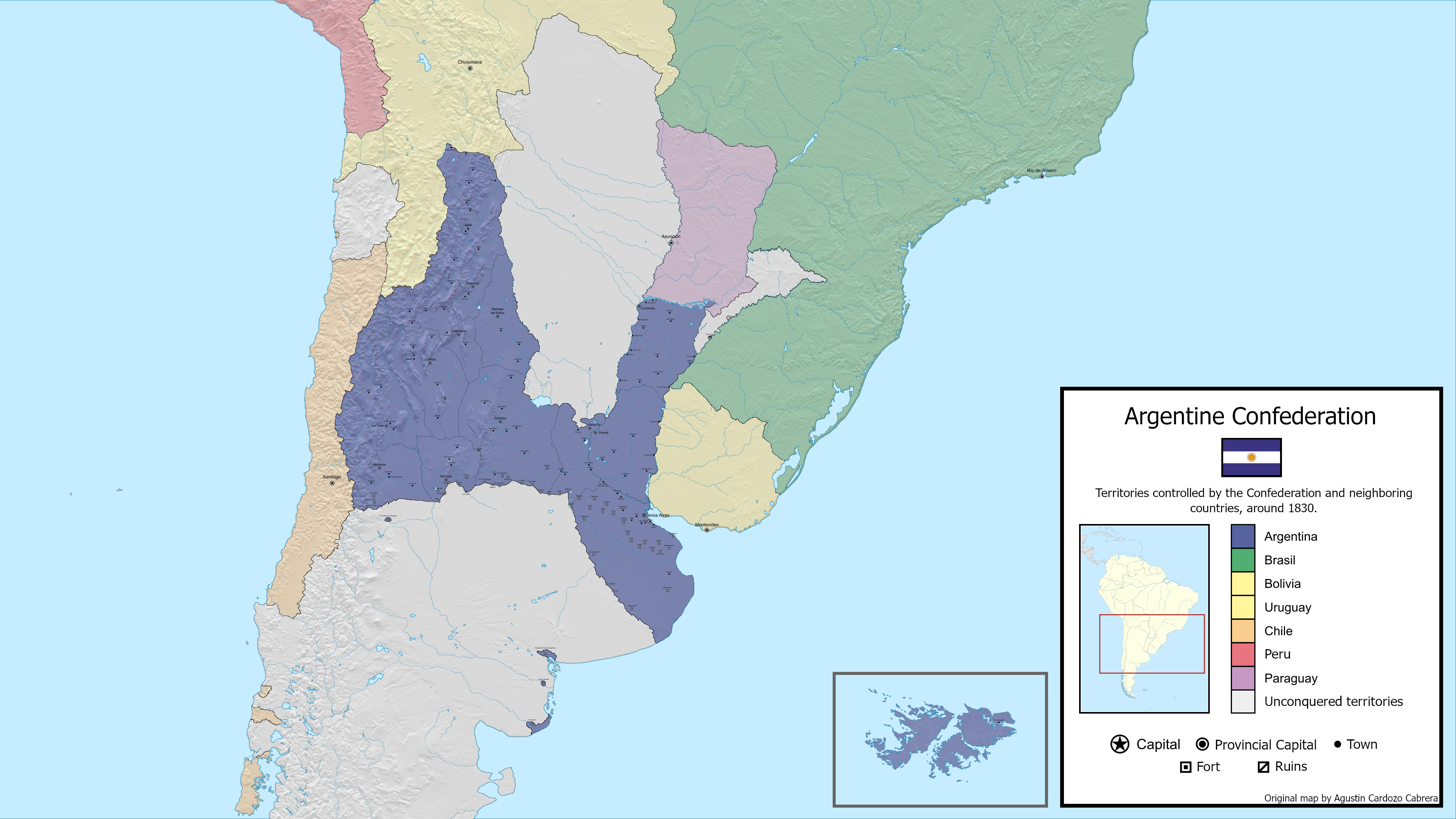
- Capital: Buenos Aires (1831–1853); Paraná (1853–1861)
- Common languages: Spanish; Indigenous languages
- Government: 1831–1853: Confederation; 1853–1861: Federal presidential republic
- Governor of Buenos Aires
  - 1835–1852: Juan M. de Rosas (in charge of the Foreign Relations of Argentina)
- President
  - 1852–1860: Justo J. de Urquiza
  - 1860–1861: Santiago Derqui
- History
  - Federal Pact: 4 January 1831
  - 1st Blockade: 1838–1840
  - 2nd Blockade: 1845–1850
  - Downfall of Rosas: 3 February 1852
  - Bs.As. Secession: 11 September 1852
  - Battle of Cepeda: 23 October 1859
  - Battle of Pavón: 17 September 1861
  - Reunification: 12 December 1861

Population
  - 1845: 1,000,000
- Currency: Peso moneda corriente
Preceded by	Succeeded by
United Provinces of the Río de la Plata	1861: Argentine Republic; 1852: State of Buenos Aires

The Argentine Confederation (Spanish: Confederación Argentina) was the last predecessor state of modern Argentina; its name is still one of the official names of the country according to the Argentine Constitution, Article 35. It was the name of the country from 1831 to 1852, when the provinces were organized as a confederation without a head of state. The governor of Buenos Aires Province (Juan Manuel de Rosas during most of the period) managed foreign relations during this time. Under his rule, the Argentine Confederation engaged in conflicts with Brazil, Bolivia, Uruguay, France and the United Kingdom, as well as other Argentine factions during the Argentine Civil Wars.

Rosas was ousted from power in 1852 by Justo José de Urquiza, after the battle of Caseros. Urquiza convened the 1853 Constituent Assembly to write a national constitution. Buenos Aires resisted Urquiza and seceded from the Confederation in 1852, becoming the State of Buenos Aires; the province would return to Argentina in 1861.

== History ==
=== Background ===
The territory of modern Argentina was a subset (approx. 1/3) of the Viceroyalty of the Río de la Plata, a colony of Spain which also included present-day Bolivia, Uruguay, part of Chile and Peru and most of Paraguay. Argentina emerged as an independent state de facto on 25 May 1810 under the name of the United Provinces of the South. The May Revolution in Buenos Aires began the Argentine War of Independence, which it won. The country was renamed the United Provinces of the Río de la Plata. Modern Bolivia and Paraguay were lost during the conflict and became new states. Uruguay was invaded and annexed by Brazil in 1816, until the Thirty-Three Orientals led an insurrection to rejoin the United Provinces. This began the Cisplatine War, which ended with the Treaty of Montevideo that made Uruguay a new state.

From the beginning of 1814, an inchoate Federal Party was formed, which—by the following year—attempted to organize itself under the name of the League of the Free Peoples through the Congress of the East: part of the United Provinces adopted a federal form of government, opposed to the unitarianism of the central government, initiating the Argentine Civil Wars.

In turn, in July 1816, the provinces subject to the central government—plus the Province of Córdoba, then governed by the federalists—officially declared independence at the Congress of Tucumán.

In 1820, after the Arequito revolt and the Battle of Cepeda, which caused the dissolution of the National Congress and the central government, each province began to govern itself. This situation appeared to begin to reverse from 1824, with the convening of a new National Congress.

In 1831, the American frigate USS Lexington, under the command of Commander Silas Duncan, arrived in the Falkland Islands with the objective of attacking Puerto Soledad (the capital of the Falkland Islands at that time), and at the end of 1832, the Argentine command in the Falkland Islands would be invaded by the United Kingdom. For several years, a new civil war took place, after which the Federal Party managed to control all provincial governments.

A series of attempts to institutionalize the Argentine State—seeking especially the adherence of all the provinces to the Federal Pact—failed to establish common laws or a central government. Gradually, the name "Argentine Confederation" was adopted for the whole, which was recognized as part of a state, but without common political or legal institutions being established.

=== Coup, civil war, and unrest ===
In 1828, after Argentine forces returned to Buenos Aires from the war, federalist governor Manuel Dorrego was overthrown and executed by Juan Lavalle, of the Unitarian Party. The latter began a campaign against all federals, supported by José María Paz in Córdoba, who deposed Juan Bautista Bustos and took similar measures. The rancher Juan Manuel de Rosas, who joined parties pragmatically, organized the resistance against Lavalle. He allied with Estanislao López, caudillo and ruler of Santa Fe Province, and they defeated Lavalle at the Battle of Márquez Bridge in April 1829. When Rosas entered the city of Buenos Aires in November of that year, he was hailed both as a victorious military leader and as the head of the Federalists. Lavalle was forced out of government and the Legislature restored.

Paz organized the Unitarian League with the provinces that joined him, and Rosas signed the Federal Pact with the provinces Entre Ríos and Santa Fe. All the unitarian provinces were defeated and joined the Pact, and became the Argentine Confederation. Nevertheless, Rosas declined to continue as governor after victory and his term ended in 1832.

After attaining independence, Argentina had attacked and conquered large areas of indigenous land. The indigenous people conducted raids called malones. Rosas left Buenos Aires and waged the first campaign in the desert in the south, to prevent more such raids. The campaign combined military actions and negotiations and succeeded in preventing malones for several years. Despite being absent, the political influence of Rosas in Buenos Aires was still strong, and his wife Encarnación Ezcurra was in charge of keeping good relations with the people of the city.

On October 11, 1833, the city was filled with announcements of a trial against "The restorer of laws" (a newspaper, but it was misunderstood as a trial against Rosas himself, who held that title). A large number of gauchos and poor people instigated the Revolution of the Restorers, a demonstration at the gates of the legislature, praising Rosas and demanding the resignation of Governor Juan Ramón Balcarce, a former minister of Rosas. The troops who were organized to fight the demonstration instead mutinied and joined it. The legislature finally gave up the trial, and a month later ousted Balcarce and replaced him with Juan José Viamonte, a former supporter of unitarians. Still, the social unrest led many people to believe that only Rosas could secure order and that Viamonte or Manuel Vicente Maza, who had been appointed governor in 1834 as a compromise, would be unable to do so. The murder in Córdoba in February of 1835 of Facundo Quiroga, a federalist mediator who Maza had sent to a dispute between provinces, increased this belief, so the legislature appointed Rosas governor later in the year, with the sum of public power.

=== Rule of Rosas and war ===
Rosas faced a difficult military threat during first years of his second administration. First, the Peru–Bolivian Confederation in the north declared the War of the Confederation against Argentina and Chile. Then, France made diplomatic requests which were denied by Rosas and subsequently imposed a naval blockade as a result. France invaded Martín García island and deposed the Uruguayan president Manuel Oribe, appointing instead the loyal Fructuoso Rivera, who declared war on Argentina in support of France. Domingo Cullen, from Santa Fe, promoted the secession of all provinces, leaving Buenos Aires alone in the conflict. Berón de Astrada, from Corrientes, opposed Rosas as well, and Juan Lavalle organized an army to take Buenos Aires. The ranchers mutinied in Chascomús and organized the "Freemen of the South" militia.

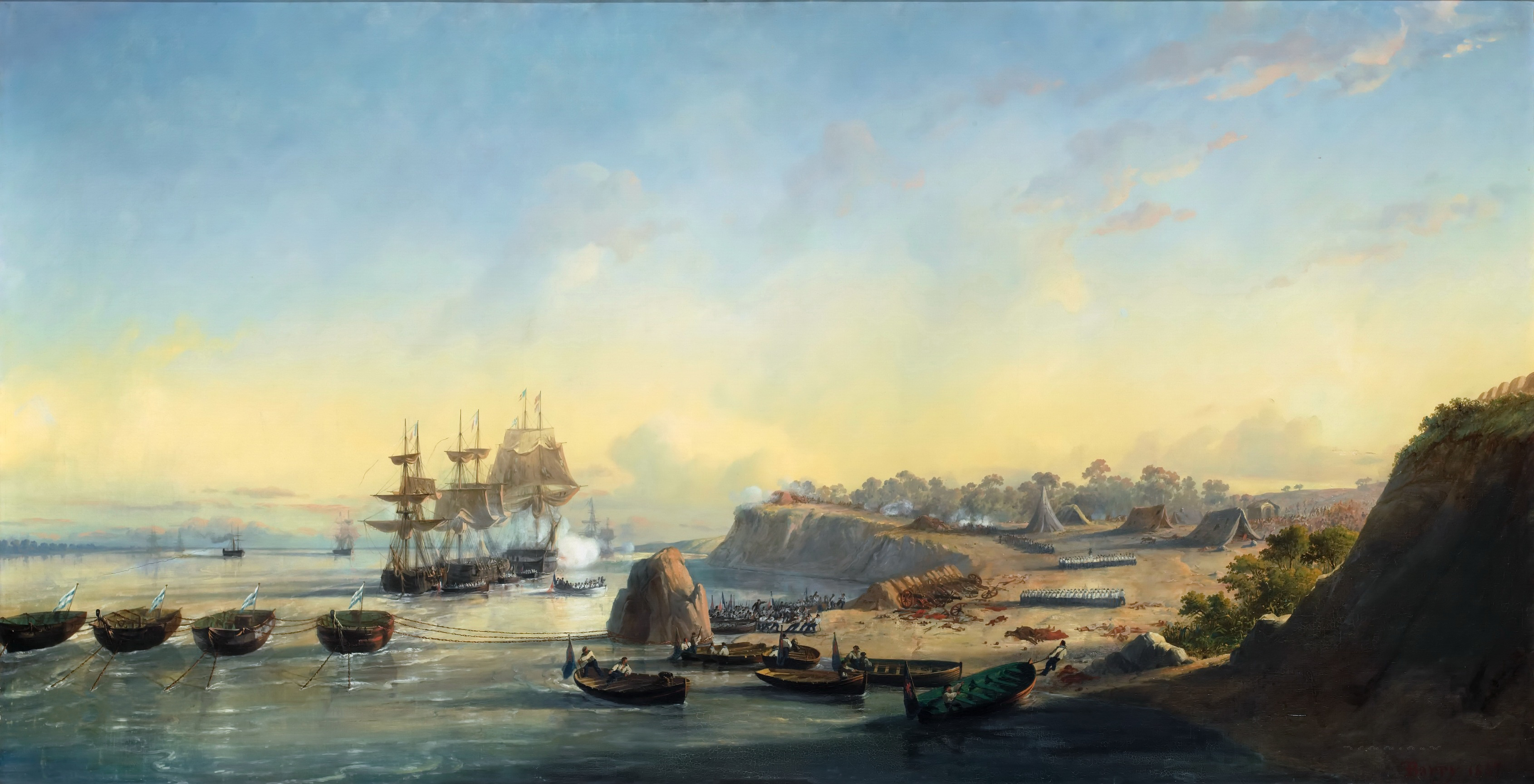
Battle of Vuelta de Obligado, part of the Anglo-French blockade of the Río de la Plata

Rosas overcame all these threats. The Peru–Bolivian Confederation was defeated by Chile and ceased to exist. Cullen was defeated and shot, and Astrada was defeated by Justo José de Urquiza. The ranchers were defeated as well. The diplomat Manuel Moreno channeled the protests of the British merchants in Buenos Aires who were impacted by the blockade; this added to French doubts about maintaining a conflict that they had expected to be quite short. France finally lifted the blockade with the Mackau-Arana treaty. Lavalle lost French support but sought to continue the conflict anyway. He retreated before reaching Buenos Aires, without starting any battles, and escaped to the North. He was chased by Oribe, now in charge of Argentine armies, and died in unclear circumstances.

Despite the French defeat, Uruguay was still an open war theater. Manuel Oribe claimed to be the rightful president of Uruguay, and waged the Uruguayan Civil War against Rivera. Rosas supported Oribe in the conflict, as Uruguay was still at war with Argentina. Oribe laid siege to Montevideo. Britain and France joined forces with Rivera, captured the Argentine navy, and began a new naval blockade against Buenos Aires. Giuseppe Garibaldi helped to secure the Uruguay river, aided by Italian soldiers. A new expedition tried to secure the Paraná river by navigating to Paraguay and returning. The Argentine army resisted the invasion of the river at several points along the Paraná (most notably during the battle of Vuelta de Obligado), but could not stop them. The damage to the British and French ships, however, were so great that both countries eventually resigned and lifted the blockade.

==== Ranchers' demands and exile of Rosas ====
Justo José de Urquiza, governor of Entre Ríos, had supported Rosas so far, but the ranchers of his province had an expanding economy and wanted to have a local customs, able to engage in commerce with other countries directly. The port of Buenos Aires had that exclusive right. Entre Ríos also requested the federalization of the national income generated by exports, and the calling of a constituent assembly to write a constitution, as laid out in the Federal Pact. Urquiza made a pronunciamiento, resuming the rights of Entre Ríos to commerce and negotiations with other countries, instead of delegating such powers to Buenos Aires. Rosas declared war against him, but Urquiza defeated Rosas at the battle of Caseros, forcing him into exile.

=== Secession and return of Buenos Aires ===
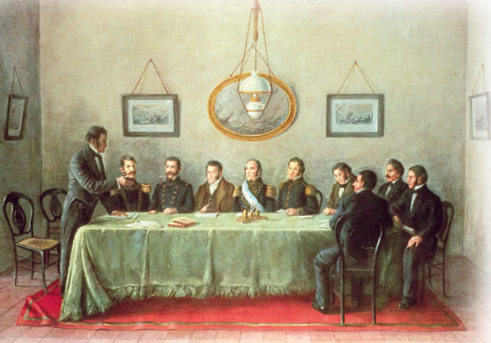
The San Nicolás Agreement led to the sanction of the Argentine Constitution of 1853.

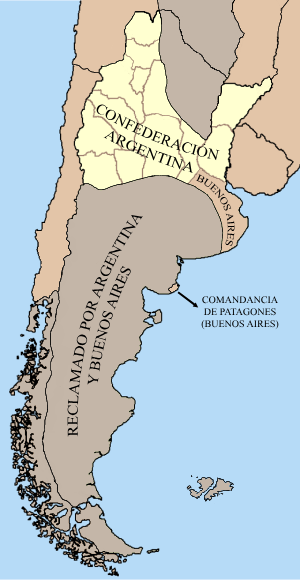
Constitutional Argentine Confederation and independent State of Buenos Aires, 1858.

Urquiza was not a unitarian, but another federalist like Rosas. Thus, the unitarians did not support him, but opposed him as they did Rosas. Urquiza's ambition to reduce the national centralism of Buenos Aires and promote a higher federalization of the country generated conflicts with the unitarians. Urquiza called the San Nicolás Agreement, so that all provinces agreed to convene the 1853 Constituent Assembly. This was resisted in Buenos Aires, and the unitarians took advantage of a temporary absence of Urquiza from the city to stage the Revolution of 11 September and secede Buenos Aires from the confederation. It was now the State of Buenos Aires, and the other Argentine provinces were now the Argentine Confederation.

Manuel Guillermo Pinto was appointed governor of Buenos Aires, and removed the delegates from the constituent assembly. The capital of the Confederation was now located in Paraná, Entre Ríos. Buenos Aires attempted military actions against the Confederation, to prevent the work of the Assembly, but failed. The Argentine Constitution of 1853 was sanctioned on May 1, 1853, inviting Buenos Aires to return. Buenos Aires wrote its own constitution in 1854. Both countries, the Confederation and the State of Buenos Aires, accepted the status quo, with a serious danger of the secession becoming permanent.

The Confederation attacked Buenos Aires in 1856, led by Jerónimo Costa, who was defeated by Bartolomé Mitre. Mitre got 140 prisoners: he executed 125 of them.

In 1857, Mitre and other politicians in Buenos Aires considered making the secession a definitive one, renaming the state to the "Republic of the Río de la Plata". The project was resisted by Domingo Faustino Sarmiento, who began his conflicts with Mitre. The project did not find popular support, and was forgotten.

The Confederation had a political commotion with the murder of Nazario Benavídez, from San Juan, carried out by supporters of Sarmiento. Urquiza defeated Mitre at the Battle of Cepeda, and laid siege to the city. Most federals thought that Urquiza should occupy Buenos Aires and impose the Constitution on the rebellious province. However, Urquiza just stayed outside, and sought the mediation of the Paraguayan Francisco Solano López. Buenos Aires would call a Constituent Assembly, to accept the National Constitution or requesting amendments, and rejoin the Confederation.

The Assembly requested several amendments, the most important of which was that Buenos Aires would not be the capital city of Argentina. This would allow the city to keep the exclusive use of the port. With Santiago Derqui as the new president of the Confederation, the amendments were accepted, and the new National constitution promulgated. However, the murder of governor José Antonio Virasoro generated new military conflicts between Buenos Aires and the Confederation. Mitre defeated Urquiza at the battle of Pavón in 1861, and Buenos Aires returned to the Confederation, which would then become the modern Republic of Argentina.

== See also ==
- Name of Argentina
- Argentine War of Independence

== Bibliography ==
- Galasso, Norberto (2011), Historia de la Argentina, Tomo I, Buenos Aires: Colihue, ISBN 978-950-563-478-1
- Lynch, John (2001). Argentine Caudillo: Juan Manuel de Rosas (2 ed.). Wilmington, Delaware: Scholarly Resources. ISBN 0-8420-2897-8.
- Rock, David (1987). Argentina, 1516–1987: From Spanish Colonization to Alfonsín. Los Angeles: University of California Press. ISBN 0-520-06178-0.
