= Domingo Crespo =

Argentine politician

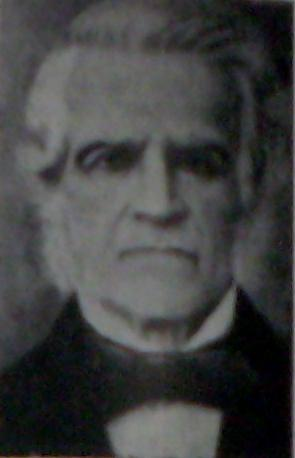

Domingo Crespo (1791–1871) was an Argentine politician who was governor of the province of Santa Fe from 1851 to 1854.

Crespo was a landowner born in Santa Fe City. In 1851 he supported the movement of the Federales led by the caudillo Justo José de Urquiza against the supremacy of Buenos Aires governor Juan Manuel de Rosas. He was appointed governor of Santa Fe by the Junta of Representatives of the province on 29 February 1852.

Governor Crespo faced a critical economic situation. His administration controlled spending and paid off debt, bringing order to the provincial budget. Crespo sponsored laws favouring the rent of public lands and encouraging immigration and colonization, and organized a more independent judicial branch.

Crespo was Santa Fe's representative at the meeting summoned in April 1852 by Urquiza in San Nicolás de los Arroyos in order to agree on the preliminary steps towards the creation of the National Constitution. The San Nicolás Agreement designed the city of Santa Fe as the seat of the General Constitutional Congress, which was held there in 1853.

Preceded by Pascual Echagüe	Governor of Santa Fe; 1851–1854	Succeeded by José María Cullen
