= Pedro Ferré =

Argentine politician and military officer

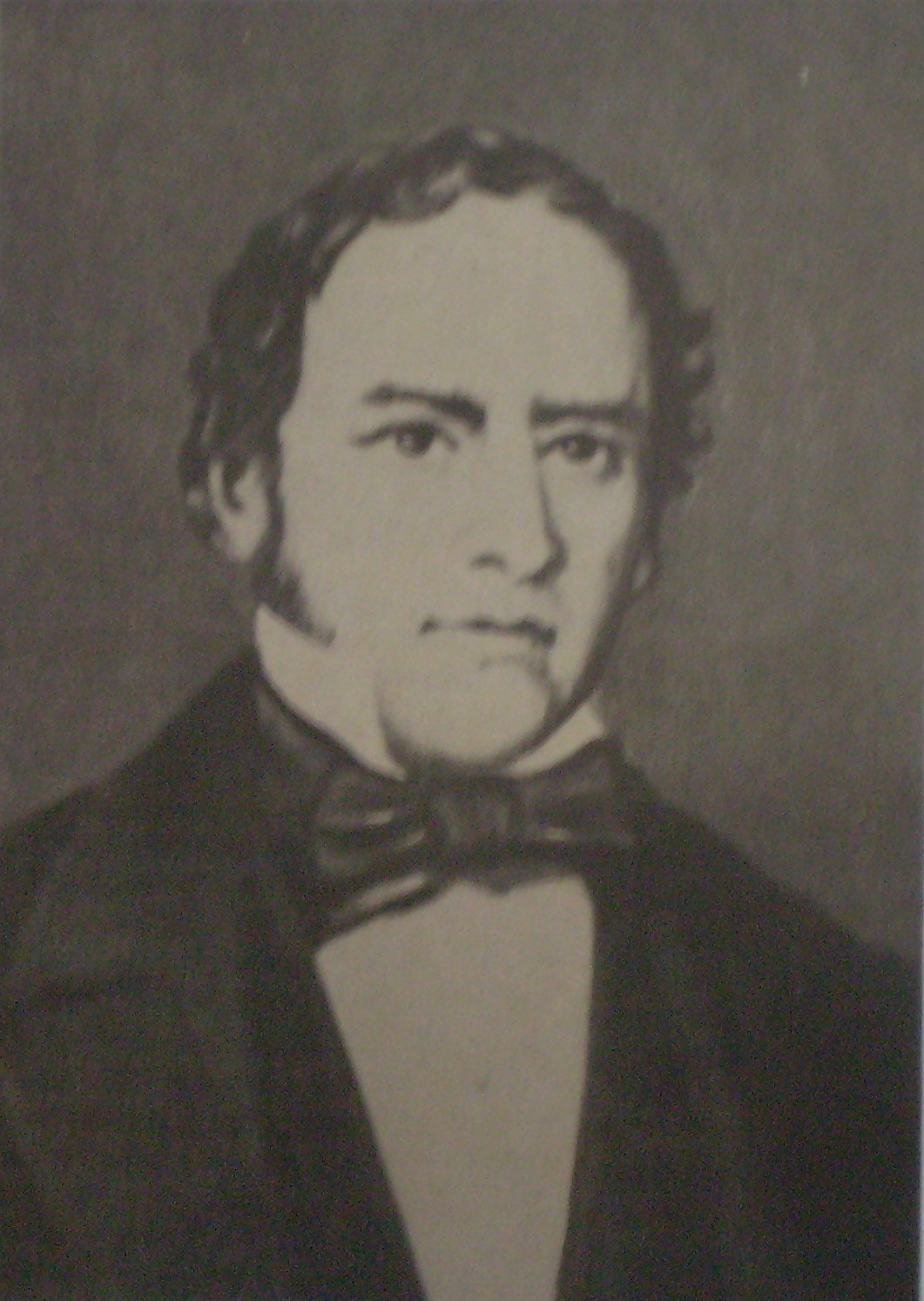
Pedro Ferré, was an Argentine politician and military officer.

Pedro Ferré (29 June 1788 - 21 January 1867) was an Argentine politician and military officer, who served in four terms as Governor of Corrientes Province (1824-1828, 1830-1833, 1839 and the last term between 1839 and 1842) and was constitutional delegate for the redaction of the Argentine Constitution of 1853.

He was elected National Senator and was designated provisional president of the Senate between 1864 and 1865.
