= Constitution of Argentina =

The Constitution of the Argentine Nation (Spanish: Constitución de la Nación Argentina) is the supreme law of Argentina, and the primary source of existing law in Argentina. Its first version was written in 1853 by a constitutional assembly which gathered in Santa Fe; the doctrinal basis was taken in part from the United States Constitution. It was then reformed in 1860, 1866, 1898, 1949, 1957 (which mainly repealed the 1949 reform), and the current version is the reformed text of 1994. It's the seventh oldest national constitution currently in effect being ratified on 1 May 1853.

The Argentine Constitution consists of a preamble and two normative parts:

- Preamble
- First part: Declarations, Rights and Guarantees (arts. 1-43)
- Second part: Authorities of the Nation (arts. 44–129).

The following international human rights instruments —treaties and declarations— also have constitutional status by virtue of article 75 paragraph 22:

- American Declaration of the Rights and Duties of Man (Note: http://servicios.infoleg.gob.ar/infolegInternet/anexos/0-4999/804/norma.htm Constitution of Argentina Article 75 paragraph 22)
- Universal Declaration of Human Rights
- American Convention on Human Rights
- International Covenant on Economic, Social and Cultural Rights
- International Covenant on Civil and Political Rights
- Optional Protocol to the International Covenant on Civil and Political Rights
- Genocide Convention
- International Convention on the Elimination of All Forms of Racial Discrimination
- Convention on the Elimination of All Forms of Discrimination Against Women
- United Nations Convention against Torture
- Convention on the Rights of the Child
- Inter-American Convention on Forced Disappearance of Persons
- Convention on the Non-Applicability of Statutory Limitations to War Crimes and Crimes Against Humanity
- Convention on the Rights of Persons with Disabilities

== History ==
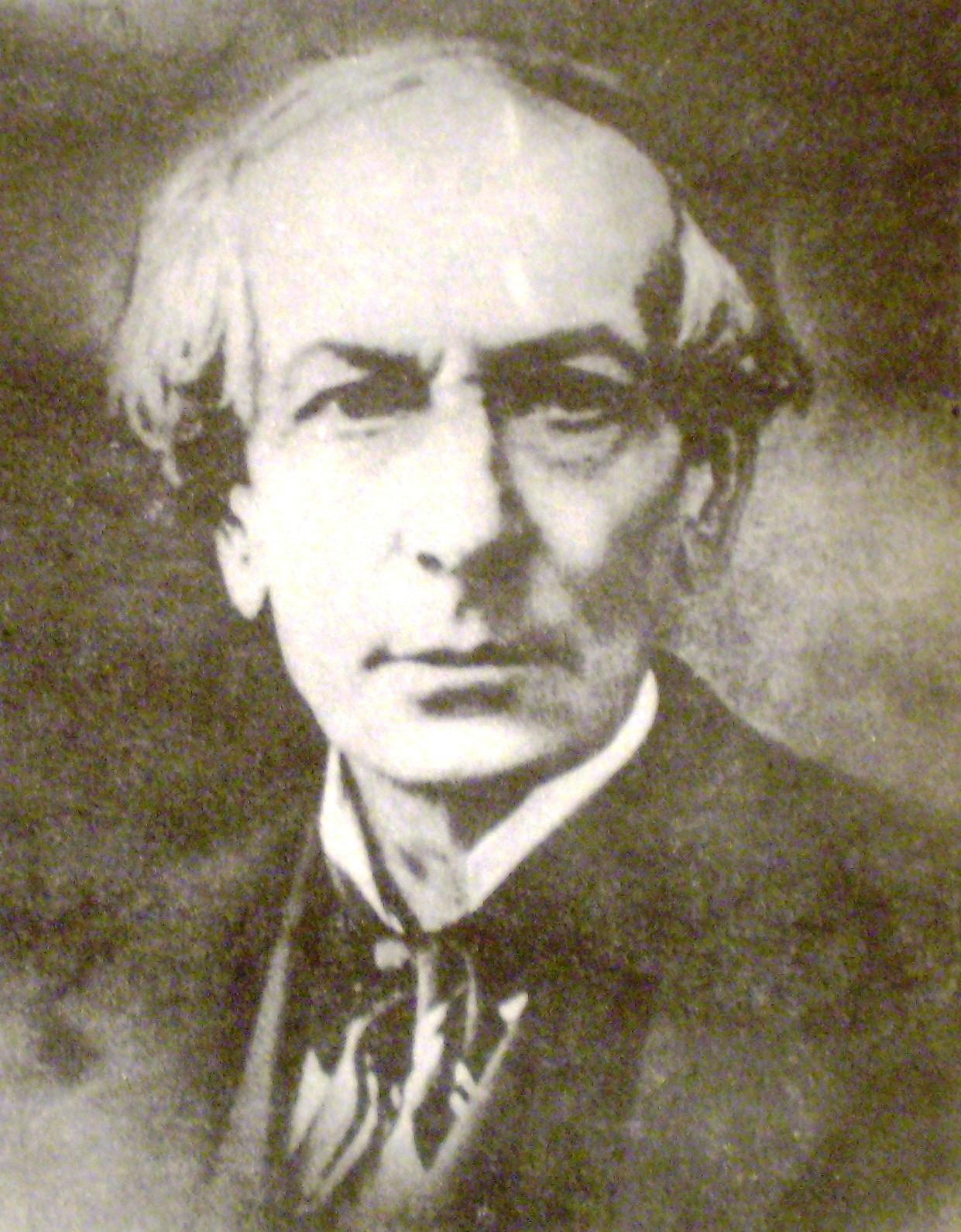
Juan Bautista Alberdi, the legal scholar who drafted the 1853 Constitution.

The first attempt to divide political power in Argentina was during the government created after the May Revolution (Spanish: Revolución de Mayo): the Primera Junta could not create new taxes without the Cabildo's authorization.

Many revolutionary leaders, led by Mariano Moreno, wanted to declare independence immediately and create a constitution in order to build an independent state. In October 1811, the Junta Grande, which succeeded the Primera Junta, enacted the Regulation for the Division of Power, but it was not accepted by the executive power. Nevertheless, the freedom of press and the Decree on Individual Security were accepted by November. In 1813, the General Constitutional Assembly was intended to declare a constitution but it could only declare the freedom for slaves' sons.

In 1819 and 1826 were declared two constitutions that eventually failed because of the disagreement between Federalists and Unitarians. Many other constitutional pacts existed between 1820 and 1853 (when the current Argentine Constitution was enacted). The most important of them are: the Treaty of Pilar (1820), the Treaty of the Cuadrilátero (1822), the Federal Pact (1831), the Palermo Protocol (1852), and the Treaty of San Nicolás (1852).

The Federal Pact urged all the provinces to call a General Federal Congress, however this would have limited Juan Manuel de Rosas's power who was the most powerful province governor, so the Congress was never called. When Rosas was defeated, in 1852, the Treaty of San Nicolás finally called the Constitutional Congress that, in Santa Fe, on 1 May 1853, swore to make effective the federal Constitution. Consequently, the Province of Buenos Aires left the Argentine Confederation until 1859.

=== Reforms to the 1853 Constitution ===
The first constitutional amendment to the original 1853 text occurred in 1860 after Buenos Aires rejoined the Argentine Confederation. It consisted of changes to many of the original articles. One of the major changes was the renaming of the state: according to the reform, the country would be officially named República Argentina ("Argentine Republic") and, for legal purposes, Nación Argentina ("Argentine Nation"), replacing the older "Argentine Confederation" in all articles of the constitution. Another important inclusion was the constitutional recognition of Buenos Aires' exclusive rights guaranteed by the Treaty of San Nicolás.

The next reform occurred in 1866 and established that exportation and importation taxes would be destined to the National Treasury indefinitely, no longer until 1866 as the 1860 reform had established.

In 1898, another minor constitutional amendment was approved. It allowed a more flexible ratio for proportional apportionment in the Chamber of Deputies and set the number of ministries to eight.

During Juan Domingo Perón's government, the Argentine Constitution of 1949 was successfully passed, which constituted a major revision. Its goal was to modernize and adapt the text to the twentieth century's concepts of democracy, for example, adding a list of social rights which included better working conditions for the working class, the right to good education, etc. This also was included in the principles stated in the preamble. It also permitted the indefinite reelection of the president.

During the military regime known as the Revolución Libertadora that had deposed Perón's government in 1955, in 1957 and before the elections that was to be held in 1958, a Constitutional Convention was elected to reform the constitution. This reform does not include 1949's, implicitly annulling it so the text was based on the 1898 one. The only changes done were to include a summary of Perón's social articles known as article 14 bis (existing currently) and to establish the necessity to have a Labour and Social Security Code.

In 1972, a "Constitutional Amendment" carried out by the military government led by General Alejandro A. Lanusse reformed the 1957 text. This had to last until 1977 but its application could be extended until 1981 if no Constitutional Convention in 1976 decided either to accept it or reject it definitively. This amendment was not fully applied by the democratic government of Perón in his third term nor by his wife Isabel Perón acting as president after his death. Some changes were related to the size of Senate and one-term reelection of president and vice-president. It also reduced presidential, senatorial and deputies' terms all to four years.

The last (and current) version of the Argentine Constitution was carried out by Carlos Saúl Menem in 1994. It included many of the modifications from the 1972 "amendment" as the growth of the Senate size (three per Province), one-term consecutive presidential reelection and reduction of its term to four years. It also made Buenos Aires City an autonomous entity with its own authorities. Other changes were done to ensure a softer presidentialist regime, the inclusion of a new chapter into the Bill of Rights related to politics, health and environment, and also the adoption of a much faster legislative procedure for creating laws. In addition, the requirement that the President or Vice President of the Republic belong to the Roman Catholic faith was also abolished.

== Divisions ==
The Argentine Constitution has four major division types; Parts, Titles, Divisions and Chapters, though these need not be present all the time. For example, the First Part is divided into Chapters but not into Titles nor Sections. The scheme of the Constitution is the following:

- Preamble
- First Part (43 sections)
  - First Chapter Declarations, rights and guarantees (35 sections)
  - Second Chapter New rights and guarantees (8 sections)
- Second Part Authorities of the Nation (86 sections)
  - First Title Federal Government (77 sections)
    - First Division Of the Legislative Power (43 sections, 42 + 1 separated)
      - First Chapter Of the Chamber of Deputies (9 sections)
      - Second Chapter Of the Senate (9 sections)
      - Third Chapter Common dispositions to both Chambers (12 sections)
      - Fourth Chapter Attributions of the Congress (2 sections, of which one is sub-divided 32 times)
      - Fifth Chapter Of the formation of Laws (8 sections)
      - Sixth Chapter Of the General Audit of the Nation (1 section)
      - Seventh Chapter Of the Ombudsman (1 section)
    - Second Division Of the Executive Power (21 sections)
      - First Chapter Of its nature and duration (7 sections)
      - Second Chapter Of the way and time of the election of the President and
      - Third Chapter Attributions of the Executive Power (1 section sub-divided 20 times)
      - Fourth Chapter Of the ministers (8 sections, of which one is sub-divided 13 times)
    - Third Division Of the Judicial Power (12 sections)
      - First Chapter Of its nature and duration (8 sections)
      - Second Chapter Attributions of the Judicial Power (4 sections)
    - Fourth Section Of the Public Ministry (1 section)
  - Second Title Provincial Governments (9 sections)
- Transitory Provisions

== Preamble ==
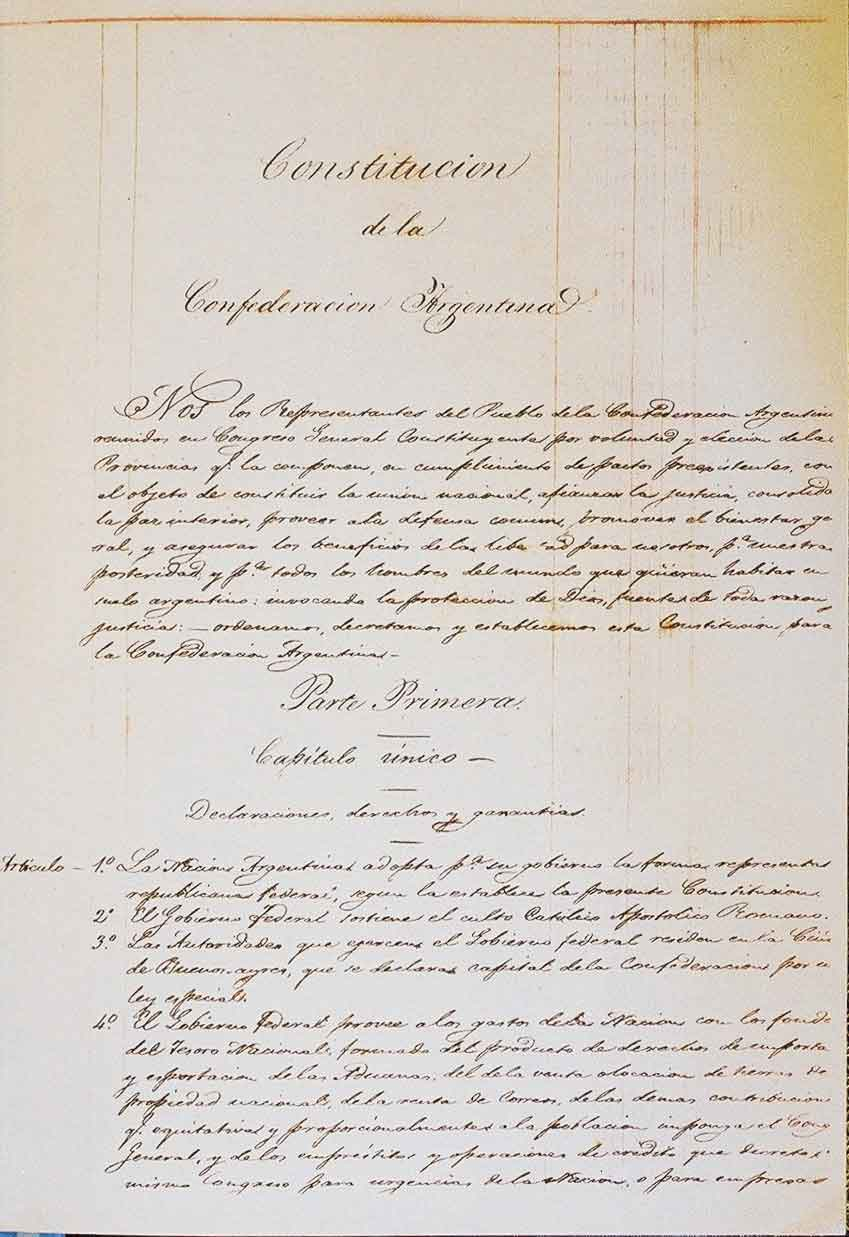
"Nos los Representantes del Pueblo de la Nación Argentina ..."

The Preamble of the Argentine Constitution states or implies, in short terms, a number of starting points for the conception of the nation, such as a representative government. It acknowledges previous agreements to create a constitution (in order to legitimize the gathering of the Assembly). Finally, it lays the foundations for the policy of support of immigration, by asking "for the protection of God, source of all reason and justice" for all people who desire to inhabit Argentina.

== Declarations, rights and guarantees ==
The Constitution establishes a Bill of Rights and Guarantees for all individuals, Argentine or foreign; the inviolability of the right of life, liberty, equality, security and property. The second chapter, added in 1994, deals with public ethics, political rights, environmental protection and consumer rights.

Civil rights are recognized to all inhabitants with no distinction of nationality. This is a consequence of the traditional interest of Argentina in the affluence of foreigners and foreign investment. Labor rights are also acknowledged (this is part of the legacy of Peronism, resulting in the 1949 and 1957 reforms). These include limited labor day, just salary, right of organization, social security benefits, etc.

The constitution declares that no one can be deprived of property, except in case of judicial sentence based on previously enacted legislation, or through expropriation for reasons of public utility, duly qualified by law and previously indemnified. The person, its judicial defense, its domicile and correspondence are inviolable.

What the law does not forbid is permitted. Individuals have complete freedom to do or refuse to do anything in private, except if that interferes with public order or morality, or causes damage to third parties.

The 1994 reform introduces several new legal figures: amparo judicial (an injunction), habeas corpus and habeas data. Injunctions are destined to protect citizens from actual or imminent damage; habeas corpus (known for a long time to Argentine jurisprudence, and related to the habeas corpus of Common Law) is to protect the citizen's physical freedom; and habeas data is a person's right to access information about himself or herself, and request its confidentiality, a change or a suppression.

The Argentine Constitution's rights are divided in four groups: Civil, patrimonial, politic and social.

=== Declarations ===
Declarations state the basis that hold the nation's politics and define it as an independent entity, for example, Article 1 states that the government is representative, republican and federal and Article 35 lists the Country's official names.

=== Guarantees ===
They are institutional methods to protect the exercise of fundamental rights. They are so important that it is possible to say that a right can be held as long as it has a guarantee to protect it. Most of Guarantees are in the sections 18 and 43, between these are: habeas corpus, the abolition of death penalty and torture.

=== Rights ===
The Argentine Constitution's rights are divided in four groups: Civil, patrimonial, politic and social.

- Civil rights are related to the people as individuals. Some examples are: right to live, have honor, have a name, make associations and to express opinions.
- Patrimonial rights protect men in relation to their goods. Some examples are: to own, to sell, to hire, and to build legal industries.
- Politic rights allow people to take part in the government, by themselves or by electing representatives: this category includes the right to choose and be chosen for the government and to make or join a political party.
- Social rights are related to people as part of society: these are (among many others) the rights to work, to have fair wages, to know, to learn, to teach.

In Argentina, Freedom is one of the most important rights. Section 19 says that private actions of men that don't harm the public order or another man can not be judged by authorities. Moreover, it holds the "principle of legality": No inhabitant of the Nation will be forced to do what the law doesn't order nor forbidden to do what the law doesn't forbid. Equality is as important as freedom. Section 16 states that in the country there are no noble titles and "all its inhabitants are equal before the law"

== Transitory Provisions ==
The 1994 reform also added 17 "Transitory" provisions, which can be found after the 129th article. These act as temporary placeholders, facilitating the inclusion of a more definitive article in the Constitution at a later date, dealing with specific issues that could not be addressed at the 1994 Constitutional Assembly. For example, several of these provisions deal with Buenos Aires' new status as an Autonomous City and its relationship to the Federal Government, which at the time was not fully defined. Another provision deals with the Falkland Islands sovereignty dispute, and is meant to facilitate the inclusion of a future treaty that puts an end to the dispute between Argentina and the United Kingdom, giving it constitutional hierarchy. Law 23.775 further states that the Federal Government does not require the consent of Tierra del Fuego's provincial authorities (under whose jurisdiction the disputed territories would fall under, according to Argentina) in order to sign such a treaty.

== Form of government ==
According to the Constitution, Argentina is a representative federal republic divided in provinces, which are subdivided in municipalities, and the Autonomous City of Buenos Aires, who serves as the capital for the country. Each province has the right and duty to dictate its own constitution, respecting the same principles as the national one.

== Divisions of government powers ==
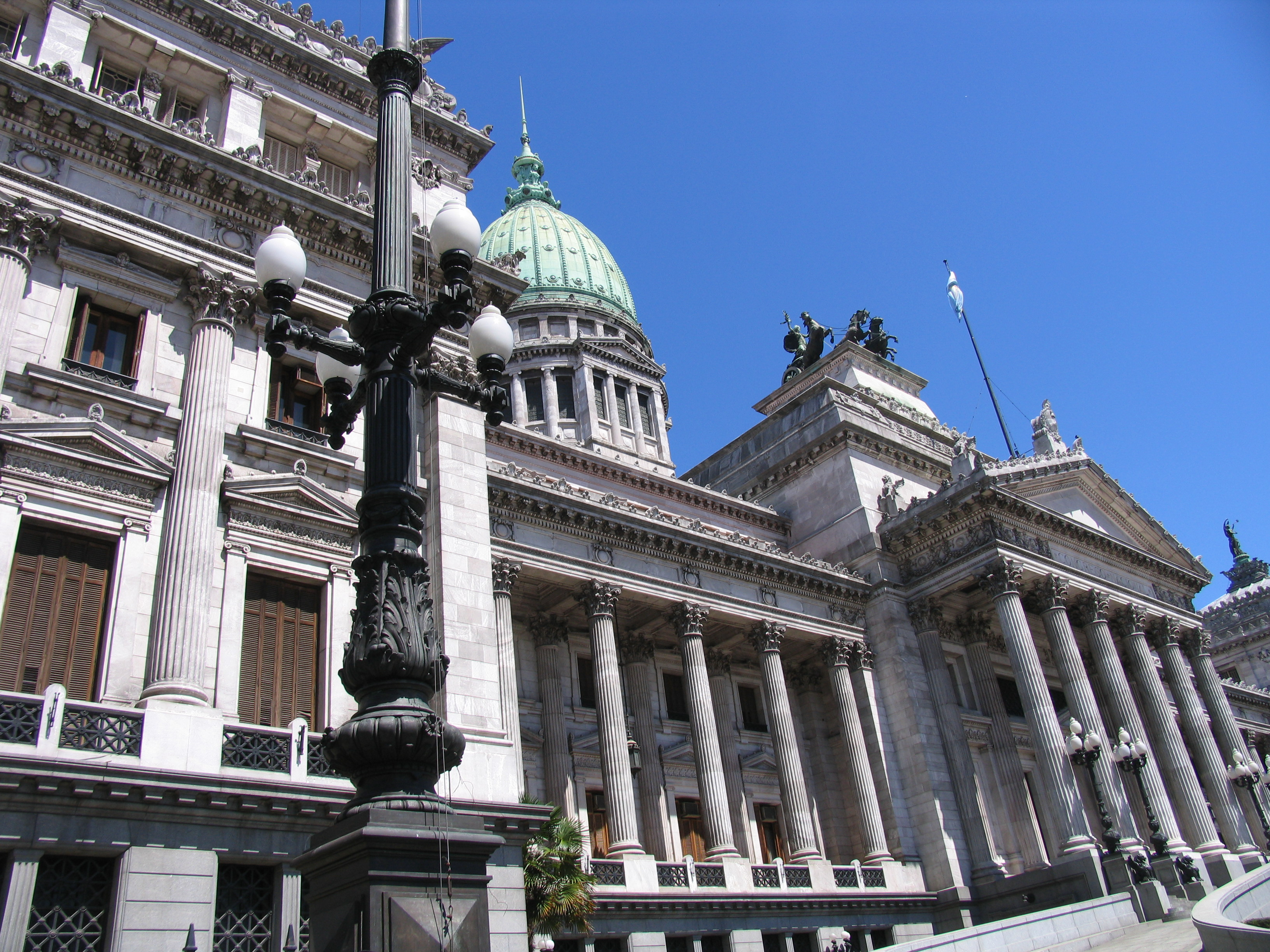
Congress building in Buenos Aires, Argentina

The Constitution mandates a strict separation of government powers, into three branches (Executive, Legislative, and Judicial) and the Public Ministry.

=== Executive ===
The Executive Branch is formed by the President, who is both head of state, as well as chief executive and head of government. (Art. 87). The vice-president replaces the President in case of illness, absence from the capital, death, resignation, or removal.

The vice-president doesn't belong to the executive branch. Curiously, it belongs to the legislative branch since he is also the President of the Senate. (Art. 57)

The President promulgates the laws sanctioned by Congress, and has veto power over them. The President directs international relations and is the Commander in Chief of the Army. In some cases, the President can issue emergency decrees.

In the 1994 amendments to the 1853 Constitution, the post of the Chief of the Cabinet Ministers was created who would serve as chief operating officer and would run the day-to-day operations of the government and will be at the same time, be politically responsible to both Houses of the National Congress, the Senate and Chamber of Deputies and they can remove him or her via censure. The creation of the post was intended to reduce the presidentialist character of the country's presidential form of government.

=== Legislative ===
The Legislative Branch is composed of the vice-president, a bicameral Congress, the General Auditing Office of the Nation and the Ombudsman. Congress is divided in two Houses: Cámara de Diputados (Chamber of Deputies, the Lower House) and Cámara de Senadores (Senate, the Upper House).

The vice-president belongs in the Legislative Branch since he (or she) is also the President of the Senate Chamber.

The General Auditing Office of the Nation is a technical advisory body of Congress with functional autonomy.

The Ombudsman is an independent body which works without receiving instructions from any authority. The mission of the Ombudsman is the defense and protection of human rights, civil rights and guarantees, and the control of the Administration.

=== Judicial ===
The Judicial Branch is formed by the Supreme Court, and lower courts that Congress establishes in the territory of the Nation. The Supreme Justices and all judges hold their offices as long as they are not deposed for misbehavior and enjoy intangibility of remuneration.

=== Public Ministry ===
The Public Ministry is an independent body with functional autonomy and financial autarchy, with the function of promoting justice for the defense of legality, of the general interests of society, in coordination with the other authorities of the Republic.

It is composed of a Prosecutor General of the Nation and a Defender General of the Nation, and such other members as the law may establish.

Its members enjoy functional immunities and intangibility of remuneration. (Art. 120).

== See also ==
- Argentine Constitution of 1853
- Argentine Constitution of 1949
- Politics of Argentina
- Law of Argentina
- Constitution
- Constitutional law
- Constitutional economics
- Constitutionalism
- Rule according to higher law

== Bibliography ==
- Casullo, Funes, Hirschmann, Rasnosky, and Schuster (1999). Formación Ética y ciudadana, los derechos humanos, la vida en democracia y la sociedad justa. (in Spanish and Castellano) (1st ed.). Bs. As.: Santillana. ISBN 950-46-0582-6.
