= Santiago Derqui =

2nd President of the Argentine Confederation

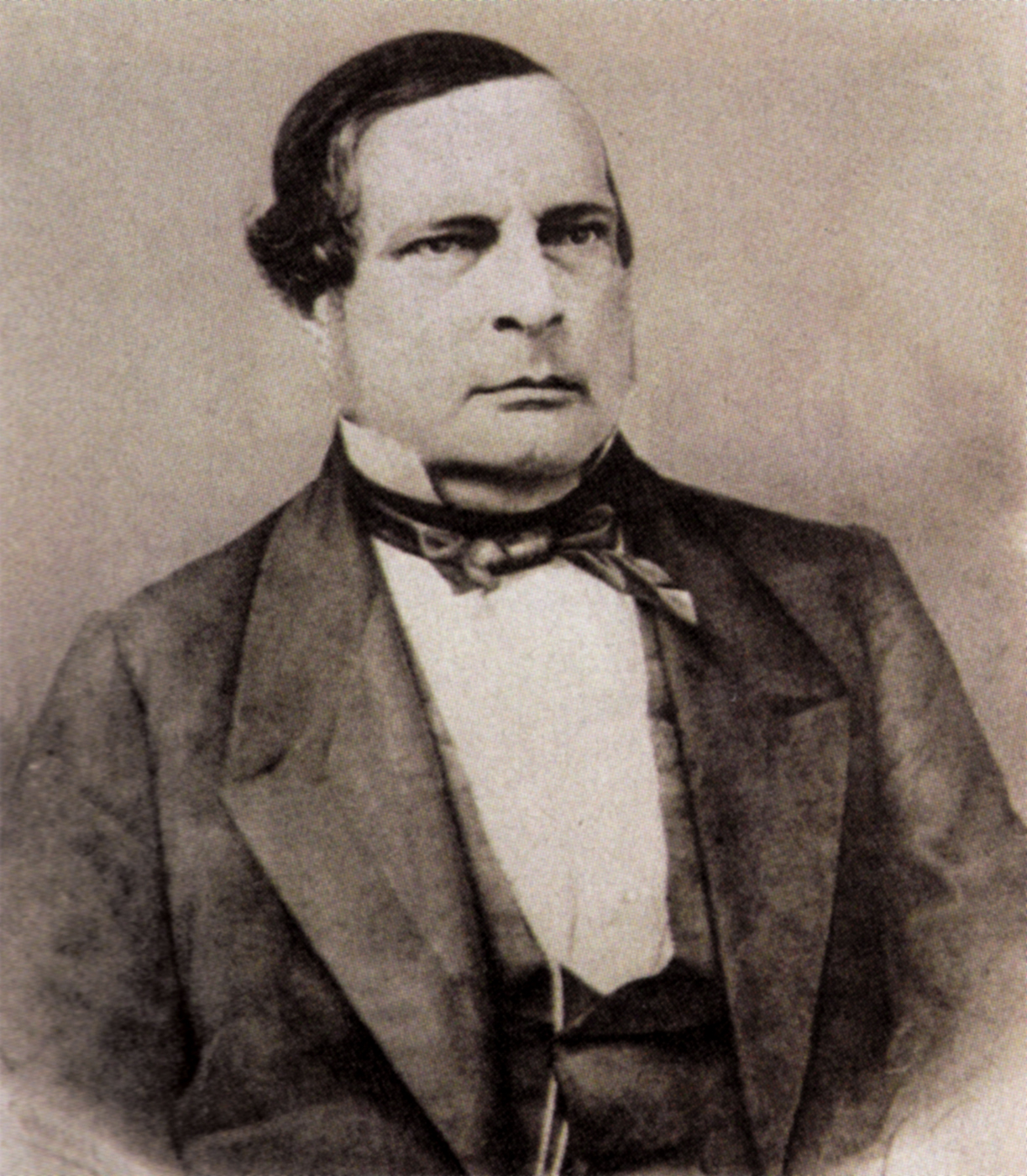

4th President of Argentina
- In office March 5, 1860 – November 4, 1861
- Vice President: Juan E. Pedernera
- Preceded by: Justo José de Urquiza
- Succeeded by: Juan E. Pedernera

Personal details
- Born: June 21, 1809 Córdoba
- Died: November 5, 1867 (aged 58) Corrientes
- Party: Federalist
- Spouse: Modesta García de Cossio y Vedoya Lagraña

Santiago Rafael Luis Manuel José María Derqui Rodríguez (Córdoba, June 21, 1809 – Corrientes, November 5, 1867) was president of Argentina from March 5, 1860 to November 5, 1861. He was featured on the 10 australes note, which is now obsolete.

== Biography ==
The firstborn son of Manuel José María Derqui y García and his wife Ramona Rodríguez y Orduña, Santiago Derqui studied at the Córdoba National University, receiving a degree in law in 1831. At the university he was professor of law, then of philosophy, and finally vice-dean. On May 14, 1845, he married Modesta García de Cossio y Vedoya Lagraña (1825–1885) with whom he had three boys (Manuel Santiago, Simón, and Santiago Martín Antonio) and three girls (Josefa, Justa Dolores Belisaria, and María del Carmen Modesta Leonor).

He was first assistant and then Minister of the government of Corrientes Province under José María Paz. Justo José de Urquiza named him 'Business administrator' and sent him to Paraguay on a foreign business mission. He became deputy for Córdoba Province. In 1854 Urquiza named him head of the Ministry of Justice, Education and Public Instruction, where he worked for the six years of Urquiza's mandate, pushing forward the still-emerging nation. He was an active Freemason.

After this presidency, he lived modestly in exile in Montevideo until 1864; the hardships he endured prompted Bartolomé Mitre and his Foreign Minister, Rufino de Elizalde, to help him return to his wife's native city of Corrientes. When Marshal Francisco Solano López launched a surprise invasion of the city in April 1865, Derqui refused to support him, which briefly led to his imprisonment. When the city was retaken by Argentine troops, he was jailed again on suspicion of having collaborated with the invasion. After his release, he shut himself up in his house permanently.

He would die there a few years later.

== Presidency ==
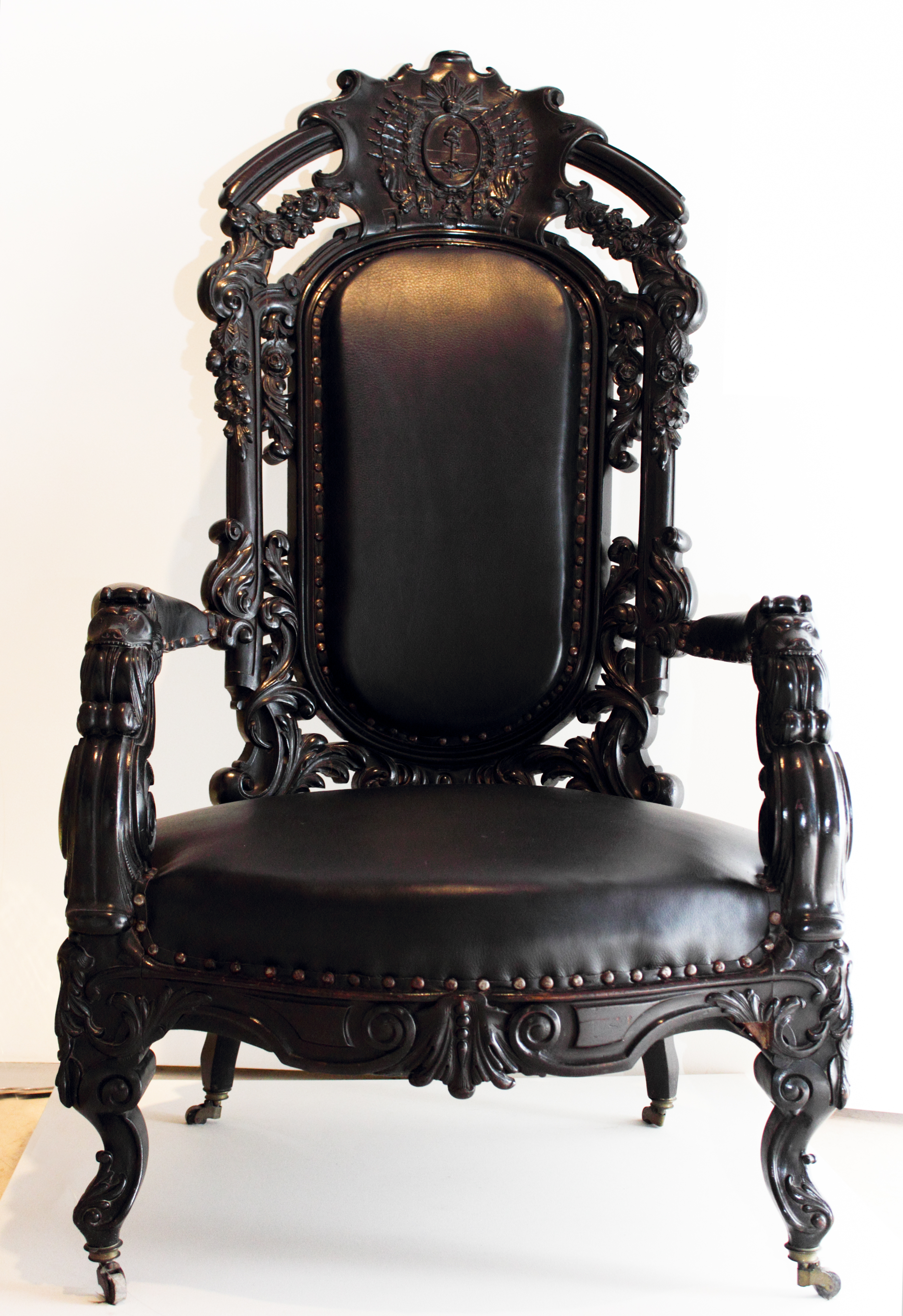
Presidential chair used by Santiago Derqui; currently in the Museo del Bicentenario.

After Urquiza's mandate, Derqui became the constitutional president. Derqui assumed the presidency in Paraná; Entre Ríos Province had been federalized during Urquiza's presidency, but in 1860 it reassumed its sovereignty, leaving only the city of Paraná as federal territory. The capital of Entre Ríos was established at Concepción del Uruguay, and Urquiza was once again elected governor.

Being from Córdoba and not from Buenos Aires, it was expected that under his rule the continuous revolts of the provincial governments against the federal government would end.

Urquiza constantly interfered in government affairs, and Derqui decided that, in order to pursue an autonomous policy, he could rely only on one powerful ally: the government of Buenos Aires. For that reason he signed a new agreement with it in June 1860, by which Buenos Aires retained control of the customs house for a fixed period, but undertook to deliver 1,500,000 pesos per month to the Confederation, and even incorporated two of its ministers—including the Minister of Finance, crucial in those circumstances—into his national cabinet.

Urquiza resisted what he saw as excessive concessions to the interests of Buenos Aires and entered into independent negotiations with Buenos Aires. The trilateral meetings of 9 July that year between Derqui, Urquiza, and Mitre, held to celebrate the anniversary of independence, proved extremely tense. In exchange for Mitre's support, Derqui approved the establishment of branches of the Bank of the Province of Buenos Aires in the interior and the use of Buenos Aires currency in the customs house, the principal source of revenue for the city of Buenos Aires and a coveted asset for the national government. Some authors have explained these friendly gestures as a consequence of their shared membership in Freemasonry.

In accordance with the Pact of San José de Flores, the constitutional reform of 1860 took place; a provincial convention proposed a series of reforms, which were accepted without amendment by the National Convention convened for that purpose and promulgated by Derqui on 18 October that year. Among the changes introduced was the country's name, which changed from "Argentine Confederation" to "Argentine Nation", although in practice—since that name was also made official—the term "Argentine Republic" was used. The provision declaring Buenos Aires the capital of the Nation was eliminated, as the capital would henceforth be set by a law of Congress; national authority over governors and provincial constitutions was somewhat limited, and the provinces reserved to themselves all powers not delegated by the Constitution to the federal government, along with those they had reserved at the time of their incorporation. Fiscal differences between customs houses were also prohibited.

In 1860 a conflict arose between the National Government and Corrientes Province, specifically between the interpretive criteria of the president of the Republic, Santiago Derqui, and the governor of Corrientes, José María Rolón, generating a tense relationship that escalated to explicit threats to declare Corrientes rebellious against the Nation. The historical moment in which these events occurred was of particular significance, given that only a few months remained before the political implosion represented by the dissolution crisis of the National Government after the Battle of Pavón in September 1861. The issue that gave rise to the problem was rooted in the new provision approved in the constitutional reform of 1860 regarding the prior residency required of legislators elected in each province before assuming their seats in Congress. This decision became even more consequential in light of the historical moment chosen for its application. Time and context combined to shape a conflict of considerable proportions. The 1860 Argentine constitutional reform amended articles 36 and 46, which became 40 and 47, seeking through those reforms to replace deputies who were neither natives of the electing provinces nor immediately resident there. The Constitution of 1853 had required neither birth nor residence to be a senator or deputy. From 1860 onward, it became necessary that, in order to serve as a deputy or senator of the Nation, a candidate must either be a native of the province electing him or have at least two years of immediate residence there. Political representation thus became a vehicle of great importance, functioning as a link between competing interests.

By 1860, after the formal incorporation of Buenos Aires into the Confederation, discussion arose about the legitimacy of provincial representatives under the federal framework. The Buenos Aires press mockingly labeled them los alquilones ("the hirelings"). By contrast, the Urquicista press nicknamed as dulcámaras members of those political sectors and newspapers closely tied to the liberalism of Buenos Aires that harassed the federal sector in Congress, calling for the removal of the so-called alquilones. From those events there emerged a process of validation of representation. Not only the origin and residence of congressmen, but also the political interests at stake in the construction of national power, were called into question.

=== Break with Buenos Aires ===
On 16 November, relations with Buenos Aires became strained again due to the rebellion in San Juan Province, led by Antonino Aberastain, which began with the murder of governor José Antonio Virasoro; Domingo Faustino Sarmiento, one of Mitre's ministers, not only financed and organized the revolution, but also applauded the killing in the press.

Derqui appointed the governor of San Luis Province, General Juan Saá, as federal intervener in San Juan. Saá surrounded the mutineers in the Battle of Rinconada del Pocito on 11 January 1861 and subdued them. Aberastain implicated Sarmiento in the rebellion, and two days later he was executed by firing squad.

The government and press of Buenos Aires—which had celebrated Virasoro's death—demanded that Derqui punish Saá and restore the liberals to the government of San Juan. Mitre described the episode as "the last gasp of barbarism and violence."

Relations between Buenos Aires and the national government were abruptly severed, and the Buenos Aires ministers withdrew from the government. The Buenos Aires government stopped paying the contributions—to which it had committed itself and which it had been making only with great delay—thereby seeking to strangle the Nation economically.

Even more serious events took place in Mendoza, though not of political origin: on 20 March 1861, an earthquake completely destroyed the provincial capital, which had to be rebuilt a short distance away.

The crisis in San Juan, the superiority of Buenos Aires's economic position, and the relative successes of its ally Taboada convinced Mitre to ignore the treaties by which Buenos Aires had rejoined the Nation and to try to force a new National Organization under the leadership of Buenos Aires.

Thanks to Derqui's promises to respect the electoral law of Buenos Aires—made when his relations with Mitre were still cordial—the deputies from Buenos Aires Province were elected by single-member districts, as required by Buenos Aires law. But on 13 April the Buenos Aires deputies were rejected because they had not been elected according to national law. The elected senators also immediately withdrew, and Mitre announced that he would not hold new elections.

=== Battle of Pavón ===
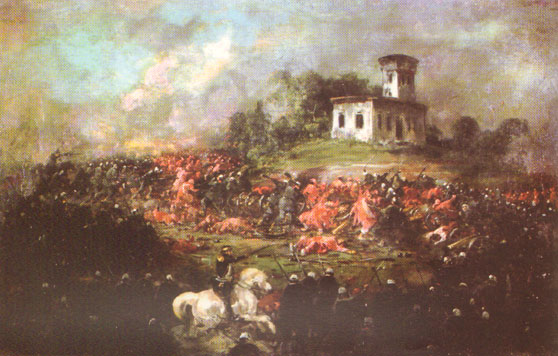
The Battle of Pavón.

At the beginning of 1861, the governor of Córdoba, Mariano Fragueiro, defeated a revolution against him, but the province was left in chaos. The new governor—an ally of Buenos Aires—invaded San Luis Province, accusing Governor Saá over Aberastain's death. In response to Derqui's demand that he maintain peace with San Luis, the governor replied that Derqui had no right to interfere in the internal affairs of his province.

Derqui reacted swiftly: he secured from Congress a declaration of a state of siege and federal intervention in Córdoba, installing himself personally in that province and assuming its government; this was the only case in Argentine history of a federal intervention directed by a president. He then charged Urquiza and the other governors with organizing the provincial militias and preparing for war. He then devoted himself to strengthening his party and organizing an army in Córdoba with troops from the interior provinces. He managed to gather 9,000 men, whom he retained under his command until the moment of departure for the front.

Derqui declared Buenos Aires Province to be in rebellion, and on 6 July Congress authorized the president to use force to repress the rebel government of Buenos Aires and subject it to obedience to the common law.

Mitre placed himself at the head of the Buenos Aires army: he wanted war at all costs, believing that he had sufficient forces to prevail.

Urquiza, by contrast, tried by every means to avoid another confrontation and urged Derqui to abandon the war; but Derqui placed him in command of the national army. Even so, Urquiza continued to negotiate with Mitre through successive mediators. Despite Mitre's bellicose attitude, Urquiza convinced himself that Derqui wanted to displace him and reacted angrily when he learned that Derqui regarded Saá as a candidate to replace him in command if he withdrew from the army; as a caudillo, Urquiza made his own interest prevail over the national one.

Derqui accepted the revised national constitution with the changes that would favour Buenos Aires, and named the country República Argentina. This and other unpopular policies towards the rest of the country provoked a general discontent in the provinces that led to the Battle of Pavón. Unable to maintain authority, Derqui resigned and fled to Montevideo.

On 17 September, the Battle of Pavón took place; the Buenos Aires forces were better armed and more disciplined than the national troops, and their numerical inferiority did not seem excessive: 15,400 from Buenos Aires against 17,000 national troops. The national cavalry swept aside both wings of the Buenos Aires forces, but thanks to skillful strategy the central column of the Buenos Aires infantry seized much of their enemies' artillery and withstood the charge. Without having used his reserve—made up of the best troops from Entre Ríos—Urquiza abandoned the battlefield, and two days later crossed the Paraná River, returning to Entre Ríos.

=== Dissolution of the national government ===
Mitre withdrew toward San Nicolás, as he had two years earlier; only several days later did he become convinced of his victory, not because of the military result but because of Urquiza's withdrawal. Meanwhile, Derqui tried to gather his troops in Rosario; when he learned that he would not succeed, on 5 November he abandoned everything and fled to Montevideo aboard the English ship Ardent. He never signed a resignation, only a personal letter to Pedernera in which he asked him to reach an arrangement with Urquiza and reverse the situation.

Pedernera assumed the government while the Buenos Aires forces occupied Rosario and from there sent several divisions into the interior, leading to the deposition of eight legitimately elected governors. General Venancio Flores destroyed the remainder of the federal army in the Matanza de Cañada de Gómez, and in the first days of December entered the city of Santa Fe. Several governors refused to recognize the national government, and among the first was Urquiza, who declared the city of Paraná reincorporated into his province and handed over the national fleet to Mitre's government.

On 12 December, when most legislators had already left Paraná several days earlier, Pedernera declared the national government in recess.

== Political views ==
Derqui consolidated the liberal constitution of 1853. He advocated for Pedro Juan Ferré's federalism. Besides that Pedro Juan Ferré advocated for federalism that he was a supporter of Bernardino Rivadavia and applauded his election as president, however he opposed his unitarian policy and rejected the 1826 constitution, what Derqui thought about this is unknown

Political offices
Preceded by Justo José de Urquiza	President of Argentina; 1860–1861	Succeeded by Juan E. Pedernera
Preceded by Félix de la Peña	Federal Interventor of Córdoba; 1861–1861	Succeeded by Fernando Félix de Allende
