= Federal Pact =

1831 treaty of Argentina

Flag of Argentina used in the provinces of the Pacto Federal (1850-1861)

The Federal Pact (Spanish: Pacto Federal) was a treaty first signed by the Argentine provinces of Buenos Aires, Entre Ríos and Santa Fe on 4 January 1831, for which a Federal military alliance was created to confront the Unitarian League. Other provinces would later join the treaty.

== Background ==
After the demise of the Liga Federal, led and inspired by José Gervasio Artigas, the first meeting between the provinces of Santa Fe, Entre Ríos, Corrientes and Buenos Aires, with the purpose of an alliance, took place on July 20, 1830, in Santa Fe. It had the following representatives: Domingo Cullen for Santa Fe, Diego Miranda for Entre Ríos, Pedro Ferré for Corrientes and José María Roxas y Patrón for Buenos Aires. The treaty was to be written by Ferré and Roxas. Ferré insisted in the organization of the state at the national (river navigability, provincial powers, national organization) and international level (foreign commerce, customs taxes). Roxas y Patrón opposed to such ideas claiming that they did not have the attributions to decide over all those topics. The conflict grew around the topic of the centralism of the Buenos Aires port, with Ferré supporting the creation of other port for international commerce, such as in Santa Fe, and the distribution among the provinces of customs taxes. Seeing Roxas y Patrón remained inflexible about those topics, he decided to quit the negotiations for the treaty. Thus the treaty was signed by the remaining three provinces on January 4, 1831, in the city of Santa Fe. Corrientes Province joined the treaty on August 19 of the same year.

== The Pact ==
The main topics of the pact were:

- It obligated the signer provinces to resist any foreign invasion to an Argentine province, whether this was a member of the treaty or not.
- It formed a defensive and offensive alliance against the integrity and independence of the signing parties against attacks from other provinces.
- The signing provinces were not to sign other treaties without the previous acceptance of the rest of the provinces.
- It forbade asylum to criminals wanted in another province.
- It allowed the unrestricted circulation of people and fruits between provinces by road or river free of any kind of taxes.
- All inhabitants of the provinces were granted the same rights, except the right to be governors (only given to people born in the province).
- Other provinces could join the treaty under the same terms, given the acceptance of the founding members.
- If one of the signing provinces were attacked, it would be helped by the others, with their forces under the control of the local government.

== Later additions ==
- Mendoza: August 9, 1831
- Córdoba: August 21, 1831
- Santiago del Estero: March 12, 1832
- La Rioja: August 12, 1832
- Tucumán: October 18, 1832
- Salta: July 4, 1832
- San Luis: July 12, 1832
- Catamarca: September 1, 1832
- San Juan: May 3, 1832 (indirectly)

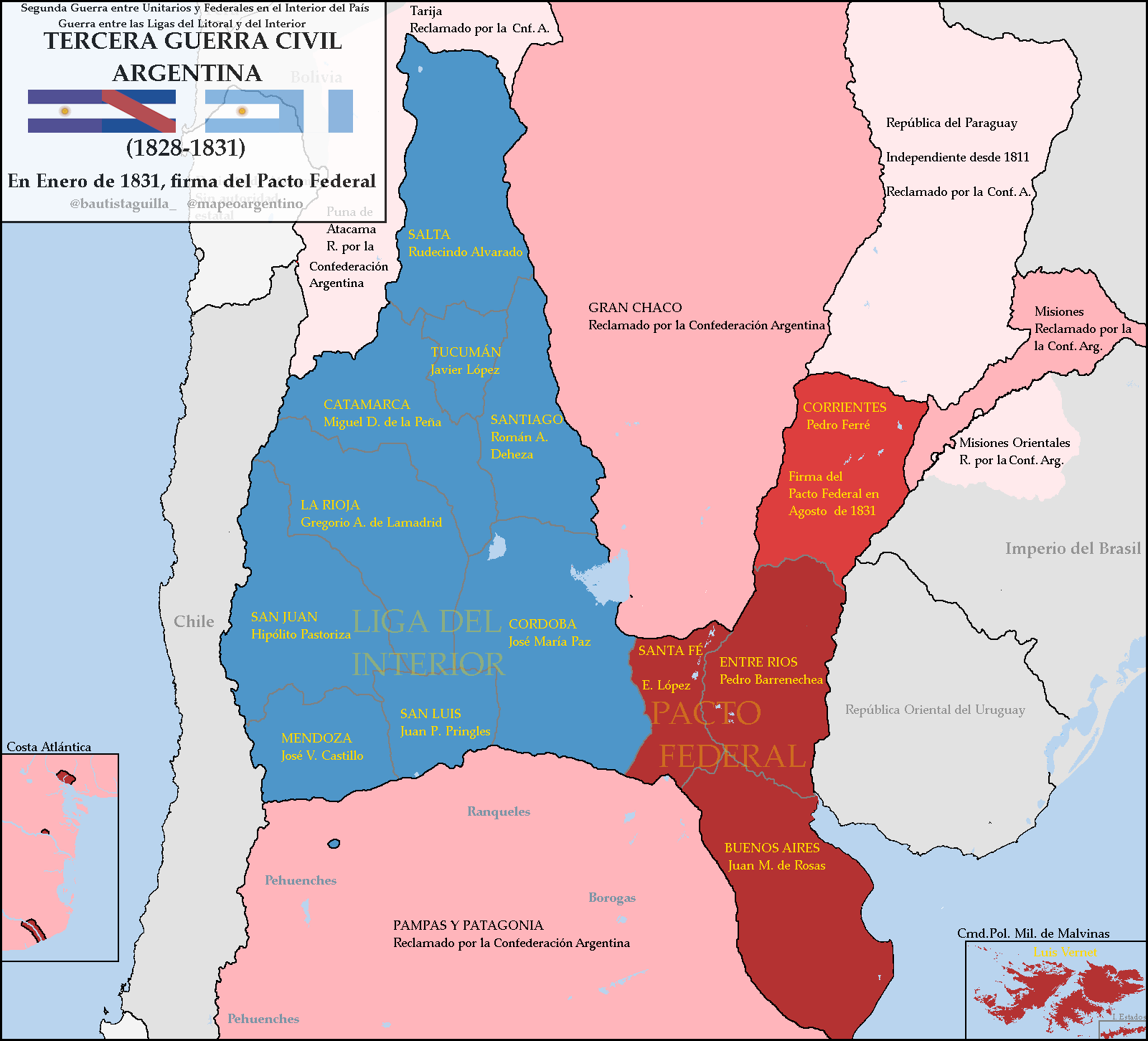
Argentina, January of 1831, during the Third Argentine Civil War

== Constitution ==
In several ways, the Federal Pact acted as a constitution. In fact, the Argentine Constitution of 1853 starts by justifying its creation "with the purpose of fulfilling pre-existent pacts," which refers to this and other agreements. The creation of a Constitutional Assembly had been planned long before 1853, but the negative of Juan Manuel de Rosas, governor of Buenos Aires and strong member of the treaty, delayed it. The members of the Pacto Federal joined the United Provinces of the River Plate in the founding of the modern state of Argentina.

== See also ==
- Federal League (1815–1820)
- Argentine Confederation
- Juan Manuel de Rosas
- List of treaties

== Resources ==
- Historical analysis (Spanish)
