= Conjectural Poem =

Poem written by Jorge Luis Borges

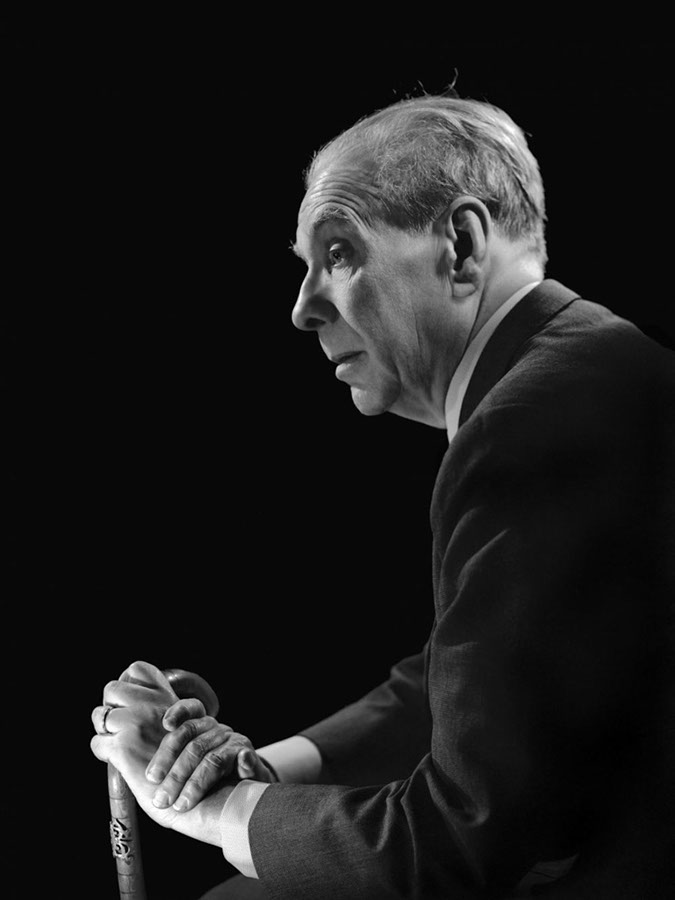
Jorge Luis Borges by Annemarie Heinrich, 1967

"Conjectural Poem" (Spanish: Poema conjetural) is a poem written by the Argentine author Jorge Luis Borges and published for the first time in the La Nación newspaper on July 4, 1943.

In his "Conjectural Poem", Borges theorizes on the murder of Francisco Narciso de Laprida (an ancestor of Borges and also the man who declared the independence of Argentina in 1816) by José Féliz Aldao's montoneras.

== Historical context ==
Jorge Luis Borges himself claimed that he wrote the "Conjectural Poem" inspired by the events of the 1943 Argentine Revolution, when the United Officers' Group, a secret society within the Argentine Army, carried out a coup d'état against Ramón Castillo's government. The upper classes of Argentine society, including Borges, were in favor of the overthrown government. Thus, Borges considered the military officers that took part in the coup as historically equivalent to the "barbarians" and "gauchos" that killed Laprida, and those who opposed the coup like himself, equivalent to Laprida.

== Critical reception ==
José Pablo Feinmann wrote that Borges was influenced by Robert Browning's Dramatis Personae (Borges was an admirer and professor of English literature). According to Feinmann, the South symbolizes barbarism in Borges' work, where Laprida finds the violent destiny he secretly desires, in the same way as Juan Dahlmann in The South, a short story by Borges with a similar ending. For Feinmann, Borges expresses in his "Conjectural Poem" that barbarism and civilization are both components of the Argentine identity, without it being possible to forsake any of them.

== See also ==
- Argentine literature
- Argentine Civil Wars
