= Argentine Constitution of 1819 =

Proposed constitution of Argentina shortly after its independence from Spain

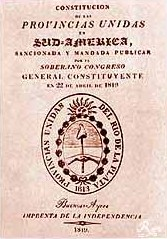
Argentine Constitution of 1819

The Argentine Constitution of 1819 was a Constitution drafted by the Congress of Tucumán in 1819, shortly after the Argentine War of Independence. It was promoted by Buenos Aires but rejected by the other provinces and did not come into force.

== Sanction ==
The Congress of Tucumán had moved to Buenos Aires, after having issued the Argentine Declaration of Independence in San Miguel de Tucumán. The draft was based on the current laws ruling the United Provinces of the Río de la Plata, as well as on foreign constitutions like those of the US, France and Spain. It was written by José Mariano Serrano, Diego Estanislao Zavaleta, Teodoro Sánchez de Bustamante, Juan José Paso and Antonio Sáenz.

== Contents ==
The Constitution set the separation of powers into three distinct branches, with the executive power to be held by a "Supreme Director", who would be elected by a majority of a Joint Session of Congress, and who would serve a 5-year term. Under the form of government established in 1814, the executive power had been exercised by the Supreme Director of the United Provinces of the Río de la Plata, but there had been attempts to crown a Bourbon as King of the United Provinces. He would have the authority to designate the governors of the provinces.

The legislative power was meant to be exercised by two chambers; one of Senators, the other of deputies. Besides a fixed number of Senators by province, the chamber of Senators would also be composed by three military people (rank colonel or higher), one bishop, three clergymen, a representative of each University, and the former Supreme Director. Both senators and deputies had to prove an estate of $8.000 and $4.000 respectively. The chamber of deputies was to have the initiative in issues related with taxes.

A "declaration of rights" was included, comprising the "rights of the nation" and an enumerated list of "particular rights" of citizens.

== Reactions ==
The constitution was promulgated on May 25, 1819. It was immediately rejected by the provinces, which would wage war against the Supreme Directorship. As the national armies that were fighting the War of Independence refused to fight a civil war, the diminished troops of Supreme Director José Rondeau were defeated during the February 1, 1820 Battle of Cepeda. The 1819 Constitution was thus repealed.

== See also ==
- Argentine Constitution of 1826
