= Argentine Constitution of 1826 =

Short-lived constitution of Argentina

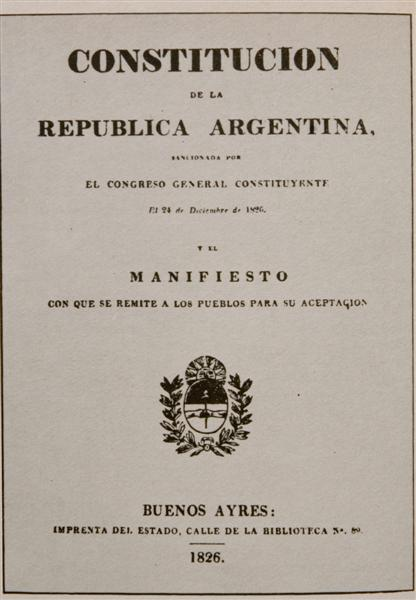
Argentine Constitution of 1826

The Argentine Constitution of 1826 was a short-lived Constitution of Argentina drafted during the Argentine Civil Wars. Bernardino Rivadavia was appointed President of Argentina under this constitution. It was rejected by most Argentine provinces, and then abolished.

== Context ==
The Argentine War of Independence, which began in 1810, was soon followed by the Argentine Civil Wars, as the provinces had conflictive views over the national organization. The federals supported the autonomy of the provinces, and the Unitarian party supported a political centralization of the country in Buenos Aires. The Argentine Constitution of 1819, drafted by the Congress of Tucumán, was highly centralist. It was abolished in 1820 after the federal victory at the battle of Cepeda. The office of the Supreme Director of the United Provinces of the Río de la Plata, the head of state at the time, was abolished as well. The provinces stayed united as a country by the Treaty of Pilar, but without any constitution or head of state for the time being. This period is known as the "anarchy of the year XX".

The Treaty of Benegas between Buenos Aires and Santa Fe included an agreement to call for a new Constituent Assembly, which would work at the city of Córdoba. The treaty did not mention the political system, which would be discussed at the assembly, nor the reaction to the Luso-Brazilian invasion of the Banda Oriental. The assembly was attended by representatives of Buenos Aires, Santa Fe, Córdoba, Mendoza, San Juan, La Rioja, Santiago del Estero, Tucumán and San Luis. However, the legal complaints of the representatives of Buenos Aires did not allow the Assembly to begin its work. The assembly was closed shortly afterwards.

Buenos Aires, Santa Fe, Entre Ríos and Corrientes signed the Quadrilateral Treaty, to call a new Constituent Assembly, this time in Buenos Aires. Again, it did not specify the political system. The new assembly was convened in Buenos Aires on February 27. As the number of representatives was proportional to the population, Buenos Aires had the highest number. Twelve of the thirteen provinces accepted to hold the Congress in Buenos Aires; San Luis proposed Tucumán.

== Deliberations ==
The Assembly began the deliberations in December 1824. Manuel Antonio Castro and Narciso Laprida were the president and vicepresident of it. The assembly first drafted a "Fundamental law", that confirmed it as a constituent assembly and temporarily appointed the governor of Buenos Aires Province as the head of state of the country, until the formal creation of one. The provinces ratified that they would be part of a same country, and would retain their local institutions until the sanction of new ones. To avoid the resistances caused by the 1819 constitution, the 7º article clarified that the new constitution would not come into force until it was accepted by the provinces.

The Assembly approved a treaty of friendship with Britain in 1825, with the British recognition to the 1816 Argentine declaration of independence. It also allowed British subjects to keep their religion, and to build their own churches and cemeteries. The treaty also ended the commerce of slaves. The Congress accepted as well the declaration of independence of the provinces of the Upper Peru, which became a new country, named Bolivia after the liberator Simón Bolívar.

The Luso-Brazilian invasion was resisted by the local population of the Banda Oriental, and the Thirty-Three Orientals began a rebellion against the Brazilian forces. They called the Congress of La Florida, rejecting the Brazilian annexation and requesting the reincorporation into the United Provinces. The request was accepted in the Assembly with the unanimous votes of the Argentine provinces. The government of Buenos Aires informed the Brazilian emperor Pedro I of this resolution, and that the national armies would only react in self-defense. The emperor then declared war on the United Provinces.

As a result of the war, the Assembly took several related resolutions, aiming to strength the military and centralize the power. It began with the legal organization of the Armed Forces of the Argentine Republic, the national wealth and a national bank. The assembly changed as well the number of people represented by the representatives, from 15,000 to 7,500. This allowed each province to duplicate their number of representatives. However, several representatives were not from the provinces that they represented: Manuel Dorrego and Manuel Moreno, both from Buenos Aires, represented Santiago del Estero and the Banda Oriental, thanks to the increased numbers.

Juan Gregorio de las Heras resigned as governor of Buenos Aires, so Elías Bedoya, representative of Córdoba, proposed a law to create a stable head of state figure, the President of the United Provinces of the Río de la Plata. This proposal was opposed by Manuel Moreno, who considered that the definitive head of state should only be appointed once the constitution was finished and clearly outlined duration, attributions and system of election; in the meantime the head of state should still be provisory. However, his opinion was in the minority. The new law was sanctioned on February 6, 1826. The president was elected immediately: Bernardino Rivadavia, with 35 votes. Carlos María de Alvear, Juan Antonio Lavalleja and Juan Antonio Álvarez de Arenales got a single vote each one. Juan Bautista Bustos, governor of Córdoba, rejected the appointment of Rivadavia, and his province retired from the Assembly.

Rivadavia proposed a bill to declare Buenos Aires the capital city of the country. This proposal was widely rejected, both by the other provinces and by the representatives of Buenos Aires. With this proposal, the Buenos Aires Province would cease to exist. The city, all things inside it (such as the port) and a territory around it would belong to the national government. The institutions of the Buenos Aires province would be abolished, and the remaining territory would be divided into two provinces. The law was approved, despite high resistance to it. Las heras resigned as governor, and the Buenos Aires legislature was closed.

The Assembly asked the provinces to select the type of government. The support to republicanism was absolute, nobody desired a monarchy; but the dispute between centralism and federalism was still divisive. Some provinces selected the federal organization and others the centralist organization; most members of the Assembly were centralists.

== Bibliography ==
- Furundarena, Julio César (2008). Historia Constitucional Argentina (in Spanish). Argentina: Ediciones Suárez. ISBN 978-987-98402-5-2.
- Lorenzo, Celso Ramón (2000). Manual de Historia Constitucional Argentina 2. Argentina: Editorial Juris. ISBN 950-817-064-6.
