= Gorriti (disambiguation) =

Gorriti is a town in Larraun, Navarre, Spain. It may also refer to:

== People ==
- Gustavo Gorriti (born in 1948), Peruvian journalist
- José Ignacio de Gorriti (1770–1835), Argentine statesman, soldier and lawyer
- Juana Manuela Gorriti (1818–1892), Argentine writer
- Raúl Gorriti (1956–2015), Peruvian professional football midfielder

== Places ==
- Gorriti Island, a small island near the shores of Punta del Este, Uruguay.
