= Pedro León Gallo =

Argentine statesman & priest (1782–1852)

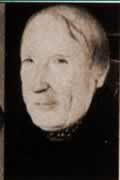
Pedro Gallo

Pedro León Díaz Gallo (29 June 1782 – 7 February 1852) was an Argentine statesman and Catholic priest. He was a representative to the Congress of Tucumán which on 9 July 1816 declared the Independence of Argentina.

Gallo was born in Santiago del Estero and studied at the Monserrat School in Córdoba until he was ordained, graduating as a teacher of art (or philosophy according to other sources) at the University of San Carlos.

Gallo was elected to represent Santiago del Estero in the Tucumán Congress and served for the declaration in 1816. He was vice-president of the Congress in August 1816 and twice president after it was moved to Buenos Aires. When the Congress was dissolved in 1820, he and his colleagues were imprisoned as traitors.

Gallo returned to Santiago del Estero and was a signatory of the peace treaty of Vinará in 1821, signing on his province's behalf with Pedro Miguel Aráoz of Tucumán and José Andrés Pacheco de Melo of Córdoba. He was a minister in the government of Juan Felipe Ibarra, before retiring in Tucumán where he died.
