= Argentine Declaration of Independence =

1816 proclamation of independence of the United Provinces of South America from Spain

Coordinates: 26°50′00″S 65°12′12″W

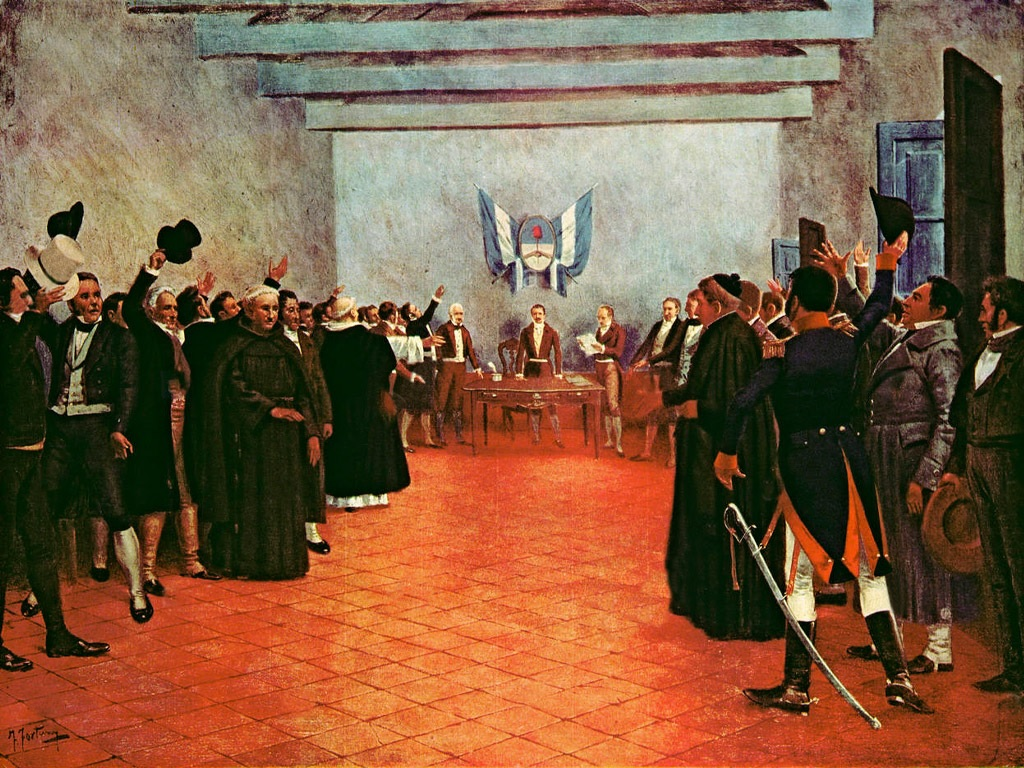
- Congreso de Tucumán (Congress of Tucumán), made by Francisco Fortuny
- Ratified: July 9, 1816; 210 years ago
- Location: Original Act of Independence lost: A copy is preserved in the General Archive of the Argentine Nation.
- Author: Juan José Paso
- Signatories: 29 delegates of the Congress of Tucumán
- Purpose: To announce and explain the independence from Spanish Empire and all other foreign domination.

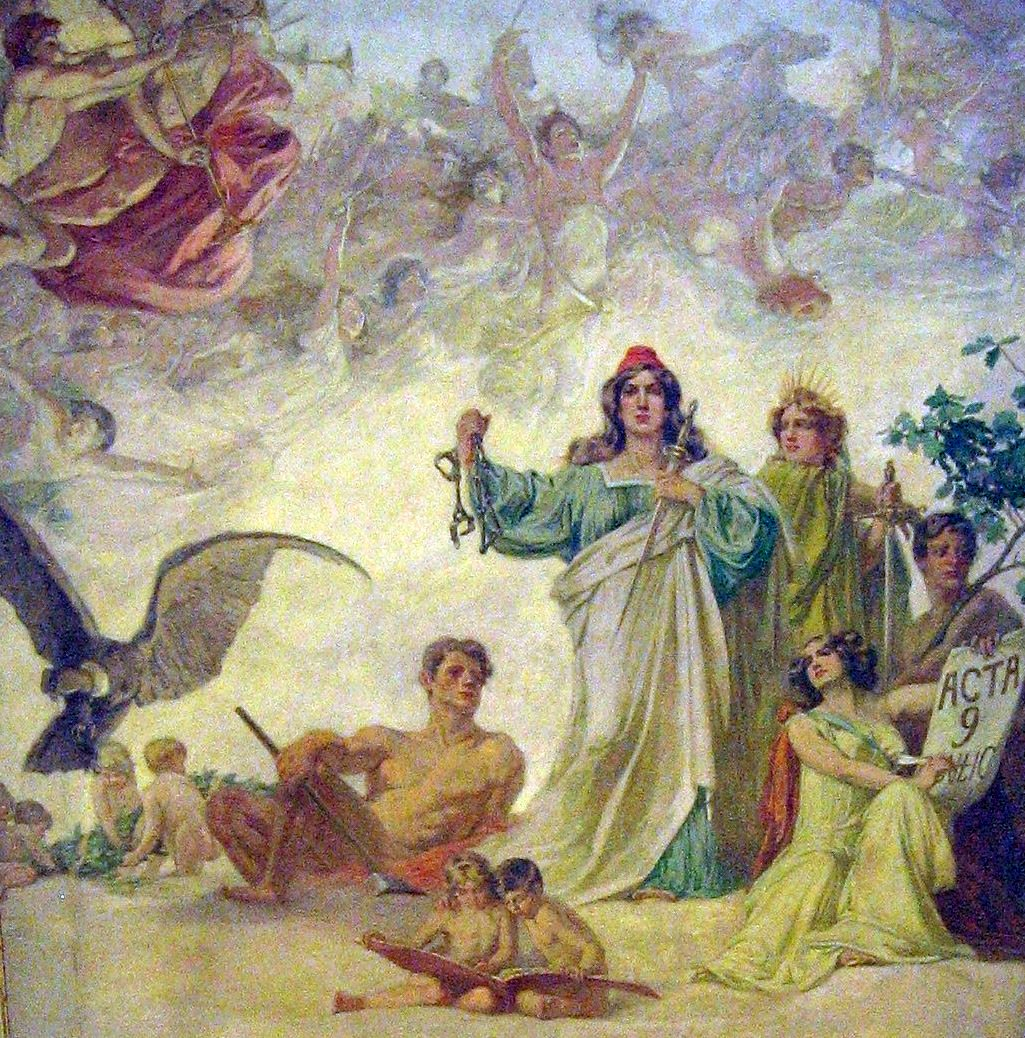
Allegory of the Declaration of Independence, by Luis de Servi

What today is commonly referred as the Independence of Argentina was declared on July 9, 1816, by the Congress of Tucumán. In reality, the congressmen who were assembled in Tucumán declared the independence of the United Provinces of South America, which is one of the official names of the Argentine Republic. The Federal League Provinces, at war with the United Provinces, were not allowed into the Congress. At the same time, several provinces from the Upper Peru that would later become part of present-day Bolivia, were represented at the Congress.

== Causes ==
The 1810 May Revolution followed the deposition of the Spanish king Ferdinand VII by the Napoleonic French. The revolution ended the authority of the Viceroy Cisneros and replaced it with the Primera Junta.

When the Spanish monarchy resumed its functions in 1814, Spain was determined to recover control over its colonies in the Americas. Moreover, the royalists from Peru had been victorious at the battles of Sipe-Sipe, Huaqui, Vilcapugio and Ayohuma, in Upper Peru, and seriously threatened the United Provinces from the north.

On April 15, 1815, a revolution ended the mandate of Carlos María de Alvear as Supreme Director and demanded that a General Congress be summoned. Delegate deputies, each representing 14,000 inhabitants, were sent from all the United Provinces of the Río de la Plata to the sessions, which started on March 24, 1816. However, the Federal League Provinces did not send delegates: the Argentine littoral Provinces (Santa Fé, Entre Ríos, Corrientes and Misiones), and the Eastern Province (modern-day Uruguay).

== Development ==
The Congress was inaugurated in the city of Tucumán, with 33 deputies. The presidency of the Congress would be rotated monthly. Because the Congress had the freedom to choose topics to debate, endless discussions ensued.

The voting finally ended on July 9 with a declaration of independence. The Declaration pointed to the circumstances in Europe of the past six years—the removal of the King of Spain by Napoleon and the subsequent refusal of Ferdinand VII to accept constitutional rule both in the Peninsula and overseas. The Document claimed that Spanish America recovered its sovereignty from the Crown of Castile in 1808, when Ferdinand VII had been deposed, and therefore, any union between the overseas dominions of Spain and the Peninsula had been dissolved. This was a legal concept that was also invoked by the other Spanish American declarations of independence, such as Venezuela's (1811) and Mexico's (1810), which were responding to the same events. The president of the Congress at the time was Francisco Narciso de Laprida, delegate from San Juan Province. Subsequent discussions centered on what form of government the emerging state should adopt.

The congress continued its work in Buenos Aires in 1817, but it got stopped in 1820 after the Battle of Cepeda, which deepened the differences between the Unitarian Party, who favored a strong central government, and the Federales, who favored a weak central government.

The house where the declaration was adopted has been rebuilt and is now a museum and monument: the House of Tucumán.

== Signatories of the declaration ==
- Francisco Narciso de Laprida, Deputy for San Juan, President
- Mariano Boedo, Deputy for Salta, Vice-president
- José Mariano Serrano, Deputy for Charcas (present-day Bolivia), Secretary
- Juan José Paso, Deputy for Buenos Aires, Secretary
- Dr. Antonio Sáenz, Deputy for Buenos Aires
- Dr. José Darragueira, Deputy for Buenos Aires
- Friar Cayetano José Rodríguez, Deputy for Buenos Aires
- Dr. Pedro Medrano, Deputy for Buenos Aires
- Dr. Manuel Antonio Acevedo, Deputy for Catamarca
- Dr. José Ignacio de Gorriti, Deputy for Salta
- Dr. José Andrés Pacheco de Melo, Deputy for Chibchas (present-day Bolivia)
- Dr. Teodoro Sánchez de Bustamante, Deputy for Jujuy
- Eduardo Pérez Bulnes, Deputy for Córdoba
- Tomás Godoy Cruz, Deputy for Mendoza
- Dr. Pedro Miguel Aráoz, Deputy for Tucumán
- Dr. Esteban Agustín Gazcón, Deputy for Buenos Aires
- Pedro Francisco de Uriarte, Deputy for Santiago del Estero
- Pedro León Gallo, Deputy for Santiago del Estero
- Pedro Ignacio Rivera, Deputy for Mizque (present-day Bolivia)
- Dr. Mariano Sánchez de Loria, Deputy for Charcas (present-day Bolivia)
- Dr. José Severo Malabia, Deputy for Charcas (present-day Bolivia)
- Dr. Pedro Ignacio de Castro Barros, Deputy for La Rioja
- Lic. Gerónimo Salguero, Deputy for Córdoba
- Dr. José Colombres, Deputy for Catamarca
- Dr. José Ignacio Thames, Deputy for Tucumán
- Friar Justo de Santa María de Oro, Deputy for San Juan
- José Antonio Cabrera, Deputy for Córdoba
- Dr. Juan Agustín Maza, Deputy for Mendoza
- Tomás Manuel de Anchorena, Deputy for Buenos Aires

== Recognition of independence ==
- Kingdom of Hawaiʻi: 1818
- Portugal: 1821
- Brazil, United States of America: 1822
- United Kingdom: December 15, 1823
- France: 1830
- Denmark: 1841
- United Kingdoms of Sweden and Norway: 1847
- Spain: April 29, 1857

== Translations ==
The Declaration of Independence of the United Provinces of South America was written in Spanish and then translated into Quechua and Aymara. The version in Aymara is attributed to Vicente Pazos Kanki (1779-1852).

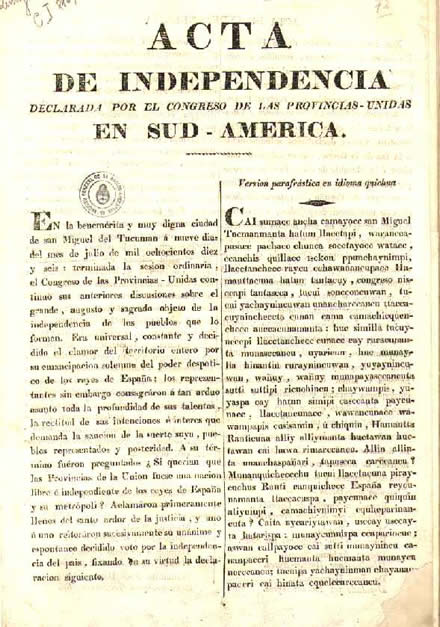
Quechua version

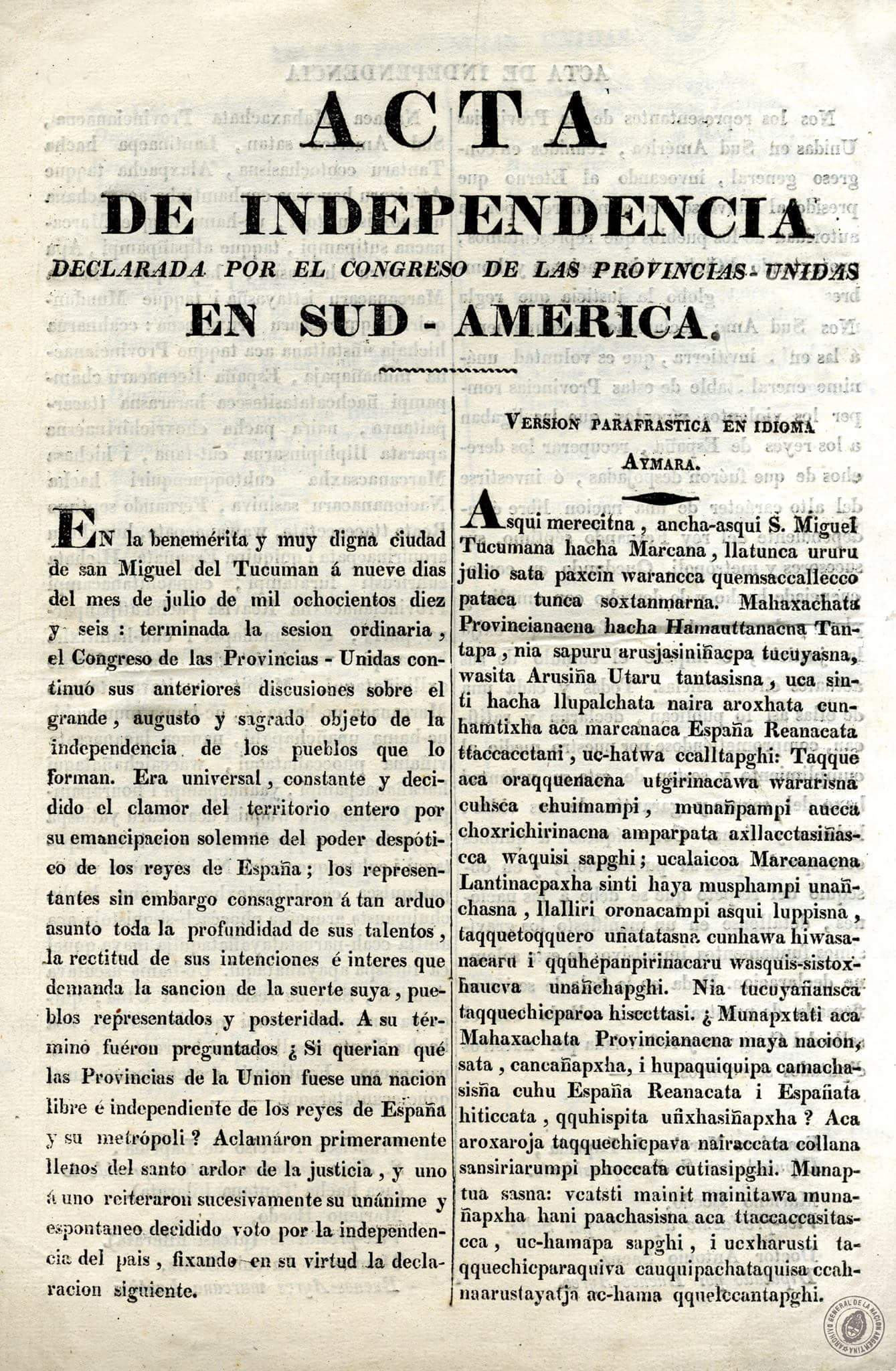
Aymara version

== See also ==
- Argentine War of Independence
- Congress of Tucumán
- United Provinces of South America
