= Gerónimo Salguero =

Argentine statesman and lawyer

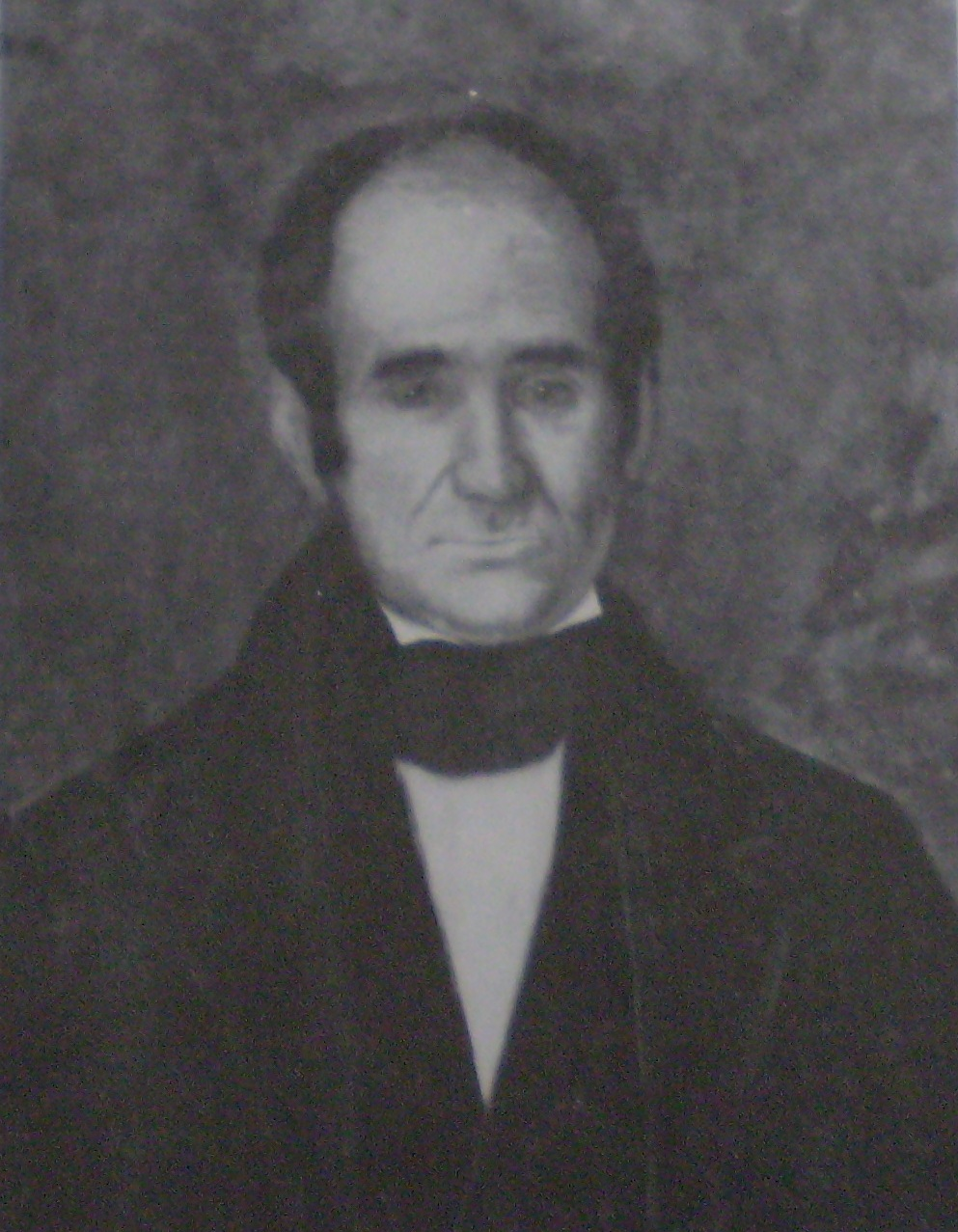
- Born: 1774; Córdoba, Viceroyalty of Río de la Plata
- Died: February 25, 1847; Chuquisaca, Bolivia
- Occupation: Lawyer

Gerónimo Salguero de Cabrera Moynos (1774 — 25 February 1847), sometimes seen as Luis Jerónimo Cabrera y Cabrera or some variant, was an Argentine statesman and lawyer. He was a representative to the Congress of Tucumán, which on 9 July 1816 declared the Independence of Argentina.

Salguero was born in Córdoba to an influential local family. A relative, Diego Salguero de Cabrera, had been bishop of Arequipa, and an ancestor, Jerónimo Luis de Cabrera, had established the city of Córdoba in 1573. He was educated at the Colegio Nacional de Monserrat and graduated in civil law in 1796 at the University of San Carlos, both in Córdoba. He married María Josefa Rolón; they had no children.

Salguero was Finance Minister (Ministro de Hacienda) in the provincial government of José Javier Díaz. He was elected to represent Córdoba in the Congress of Tucumán and served for the declaration in 1816. He was, along with his Córdoba colleagues, among the few federalists in the Congress, speaking for a system of strong autonomous provinces.

In 1819, Salguero was appointed Treasurer of the Casa de la Moneda (mint) of Buenos Aires. He also served as prosecutor (fiscal) in the appeals chamber in Córdoba, but was forced to resign from his position and leave Córdoba in 1838, at the height of the Argentine Civil Wars. He died in Chuquisaca, Bolivia, in 1847.

A street in the Palermo district of Buenos Aires, Jerónimo Salguero, is named after him.
