= José Antonio Cabrera =

Argentinian lawyer

José Antonio Cabrera y Cabrera

Deputy to the Congress of Tucumán
- In office 1816–1817
- Constituency: Córdoba

Alcalde of Córdoba
- In office 1811–1812

Personal details
- Born: November 28, 1768 Córdoba, Viceroyalty of Peru
- Died: April 14, 1820 (aged 51) Córdoba, United Provinces of the Río de la Plata
- Education: Monserrat School
- Alma mater: University of San Carlos
- Occupation: Statesman, lawyer

José Antonio Cabrera y Cabrera (November 28, 1768 – April 14, 1820) was an Argentine statesman and lawyer. He was a representative to the Congress of Tucumán which on 9 July 1816 declared the Independence of Argentina.

Cabrera was born in Córdoba to an important local family. He was educated at the Monserrat School and graduated in law at the University of San Carlos, both in Córdoba.

Cabrera was active in the revolutionary cause and became the city's head of government (alcalde) in 1811 on the first vote. He was elected to represent Córdoba in the Tucumán Congress and served for the declaration in 1816. Along with his Córdoba colleagues, he was one of the few federalists in the Congress, speaking for a system of strong autonomous provinces. He was a supporter of the federalist José Gervasio Artigas and, along with Eduardo Pérez Bulnes, declined to follow the Congress to Buenos Aires, continuing to support Artigas' cause from Córdoba.
