= José Darragueira =

José Darregueira was a Peruvian-born statesman and lawyer. He was a representative to the Congress of Tucumán which on 9 July 1816 declared the Independence of Argentina.

Darregueira was born in Moquegua, Peru and studied in Buenos Aires at the Royal School of San Carlos. He became a doctor of Law at the university of Chuquisaca and remained there as magistrate (oidor) of the Real Audiencia.

In 1795 Darregueira returned to Buenos Aires and was one of the prime movers behind the May Revolution of 1810, participating in the meetings at the houses of Nicolás Rodríguez Peña and Hipólito Vieytes. At the cabildo of 22 May 1810 where as a lawyer he was able to participate, he voted for the removal of Virrey Cisneros. Alvear appointed him to the chamber of appeals. He was elected to the Tucumán Congress on behalf of Buenos Aires and signed the Declaration of Independence. He died shortly after the Congress was moved to Buenos Aires.
