= Manuel Antonio Acevedo =

Argentine statesman, lawyer and priest

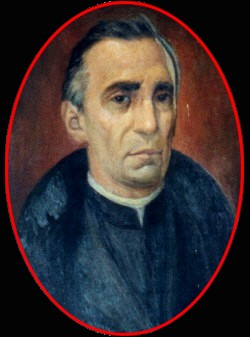
Portrait of Manuel Antonio Acevedo

Manuel Antonio Acevedo (1770 – 1 October 1825) was an Argentine statesman, lawyer and priest. He was a representative to the Congress of Tucumán, which on 9 July 1816 declared the Independence of Argentina.

Acevedo was born in Salta and studied in Córdoba, following an ecclesiastical career at the Montserrat School. He was ordained a priest on 8 December 1794 and served in Cachi, then Molinos in Salta Province, and later in Belén, Catamarca Province.

In 1815, Acevedo was elected by Catamarca to the Tucumán Congress and served in 1816 for the declaration. He supported the idea of a constitutional Incan monarchy. After the Congress moved to Buenos Aires, he served as president of the body. He then returned to his parish in Belén. In 1824, he again represented Catamarca in the General Congress.
