= Esteban Agustín Gazcón =

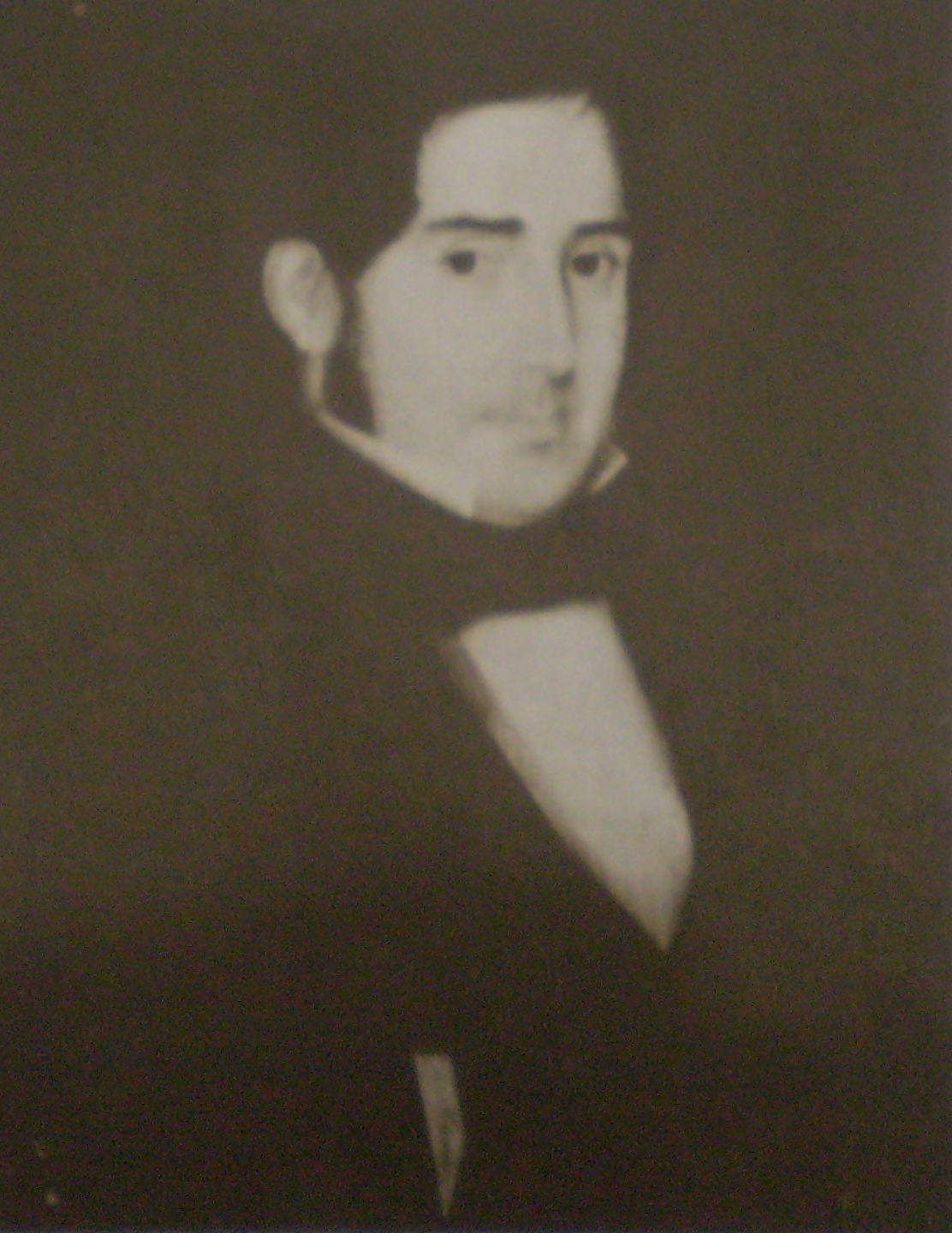
Esteban Agustin Gascon

Esteban Agustín Gazcón (July 9, 1764 – June 25, 1824) was an Upper Peru-born Argentine statesman and lawyer. He was a representative to the Congress of Tucumán which on 9 July 1816 declared the Independence of Argentina.

Gazcón was born in Oruro, Upper Peru (now Bolivia), and studied at the Real Colegio de San Carlos in Buenos Aires, graduating as doctor in law at the University of Charcas in 1791. Upon his return he participated in the Buenos Aires Cabildo of 1810 and supported the revolutionary cause. In 1809 he was the guiding spirit of the revolution in Chuquisaca and in 1811 he was president of the Real Audiencia.

In 1813, Gazcón was named head of the government in Salta after Manuel Belgrano's victory. In 1814 he accompanied José Rondeau as war auditor of the military campaign in the Banda Oriental; the following year he headed the Observation Junta in Buenos Aires. He was elected by the city of Buenos Aires to the Tucumán Congress, present in 1816 for the declaration. In 1817 he served as minister of property under Supreme Director Juan Martín de Pueyrredón and from 1819 he held various high positions in the judiciary of Buenos Aires.

From 1820 he held various political positions and was then a deputy to the Buenos Aires assembly of which he was secretary.
