= Pedro Ignacio de Castro Barros =

Argentine statesman and priest (1777–1849)

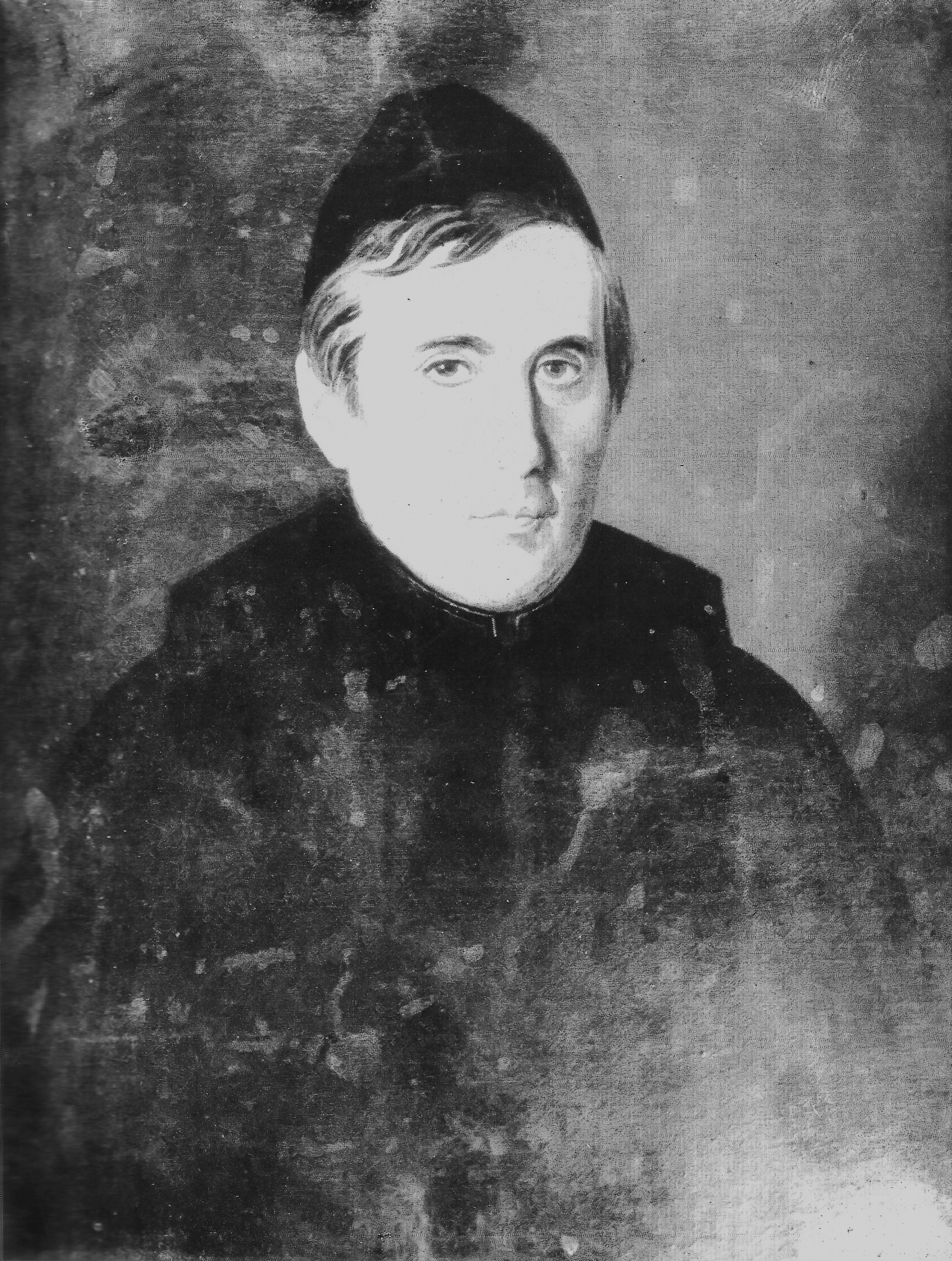

Pedro Ignacio de Castro Barros (31 July 1777 – 7 April 1849) was an Argentine statesman and priest. He was a representative to the Congress of Tucumán which on 9 July 1816 declared the Independence of Argentina.

Castro Barros was born in Chuquis, Arauco Department, La Rioja Province, Argentina. As a child, he was taken to Santiago del Estero to study and in 1790 he went to Córdoba where he was taken under the wing of the rector of the University of Córdoba. He gained his doctorate in theology in 1800 and later that year he was ordained by Bishop Moscoso of Tucumán.

Castro Barros was elected to represent La Rioja in the 1813 Assembly replacing Ugarteche. In 1815, he was elected to the Tucumán Congress and served as president in May 1816 for the appointment of Juan Martín de Pueyrredón as Supreme Director. For the declaration on 9 July, he led the Tedeum mass that was celebrated to give thanks. He supported an Incan constitutional monarchy.

Later Castro Barros became rector of the University of Córdoba on three occasions and founded several primary schools. He lived in exile in the Banda Oriental from 1833 and then from 1841 in Chile, where he was rector of the Universidad de Chile.

A museum dedicated to Castro Barros is located in his birthplace, Chuquis.
