= Cayetano José Rodríguez =

Argentine cleric, journalist and poet

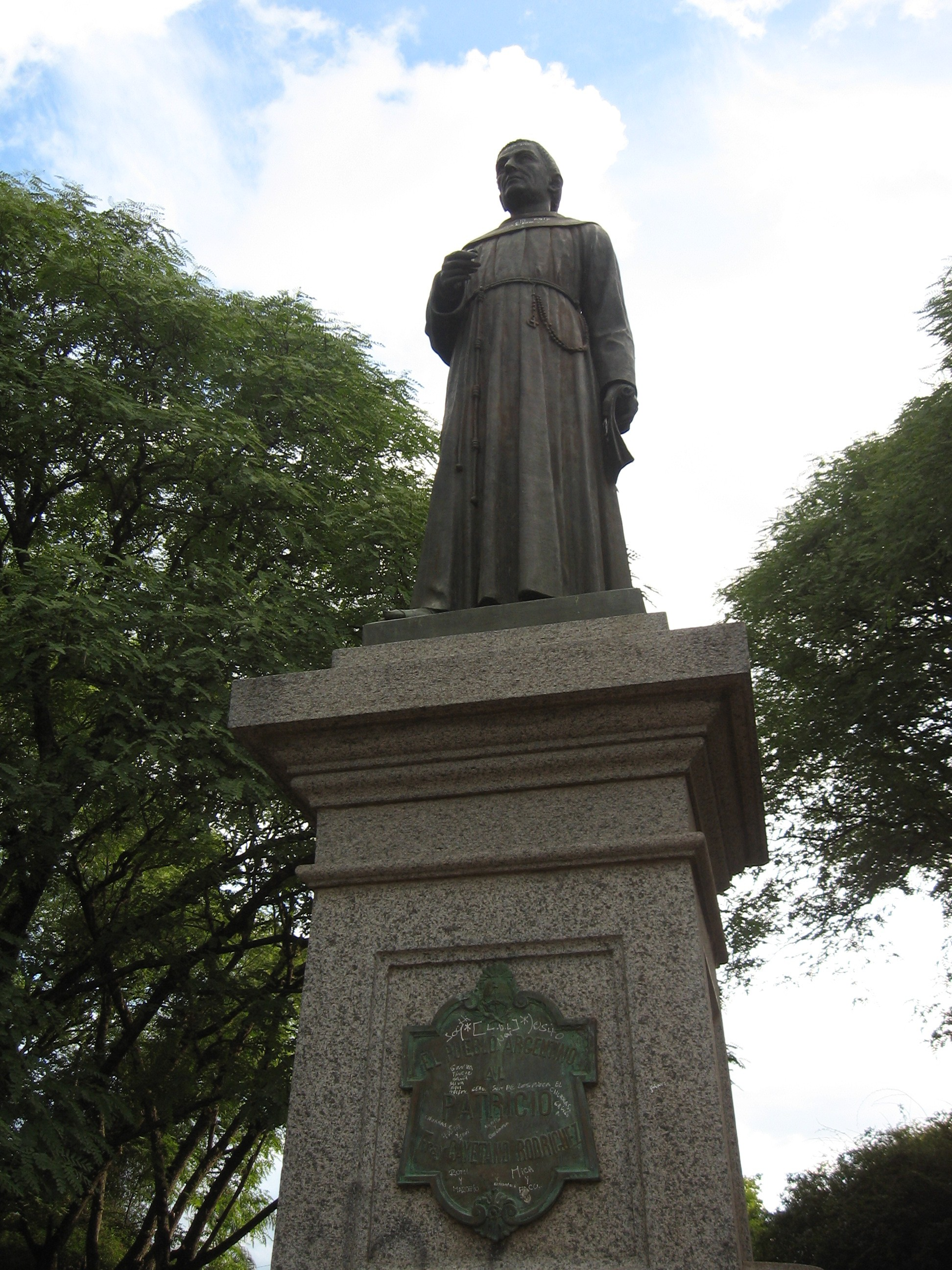
Cayetano Rodríguez

Cayetano José Rodríguez (1761 – 21 January 1823) was an Argentine cleric, journalist and poet. He was a representative to the Congress of Tucumán of 9 July 1816 which declared the Independence of Argentina.

Rodríguez was born in San Pedro, Buenos Aires Province and was educated at a Franciscan school, joining the Order at 16. He became a priest in 1783 and entered the University of Córdoba, where he held the chairs of theology and philosophy 1783-1790. In 1790 he returned to Buenos Aires and taught theology and physics at the Franciscan convent. His teachings are preserved at the convent of San Francisco and in Jujuy.

Rodríguez was impressed by the patriots and revolutionaries of the early 19th century, even dedicating a poem to the slaves who helped defend the city against the British invasions. He became a friend, teacher and protector of Mariano Moreno. In 1810, he was appointed head of the public library by the First Junta, serving until 1814; yet, despite working for the revolution, he was also appointed provincial superior of the Franciscan Order.

Rodríguez became provincial minister in 1811 and member of the Assembly of 1813, although it was dissolved shortly after. In 1813 he was elected to the General Constituent Assembly and edited the assembly's newspaper. He was elected by the city of Buenos Aires to the Tucumán Congress in 1815 and proposed a motion to set up a committee to prepare its constitution. It is believed that Rodríguez may have written the declaration of independence himself, in his capacity as editor of the Congress' papers.

After the Congress, Rodríguez returned to his religious responsibilities and public works. In 1822 he founded the newspaper El Oficial del Día, which he used to defend the church and its beliefs in opposition to El Centinela, which supported church reform and the government of Rivadavia.
