= Pedro Medrano =

Uruguayan-born Argentine statesman and lawyer, president of congress (1769–1840)

Pedro de Medrano y Cabrera
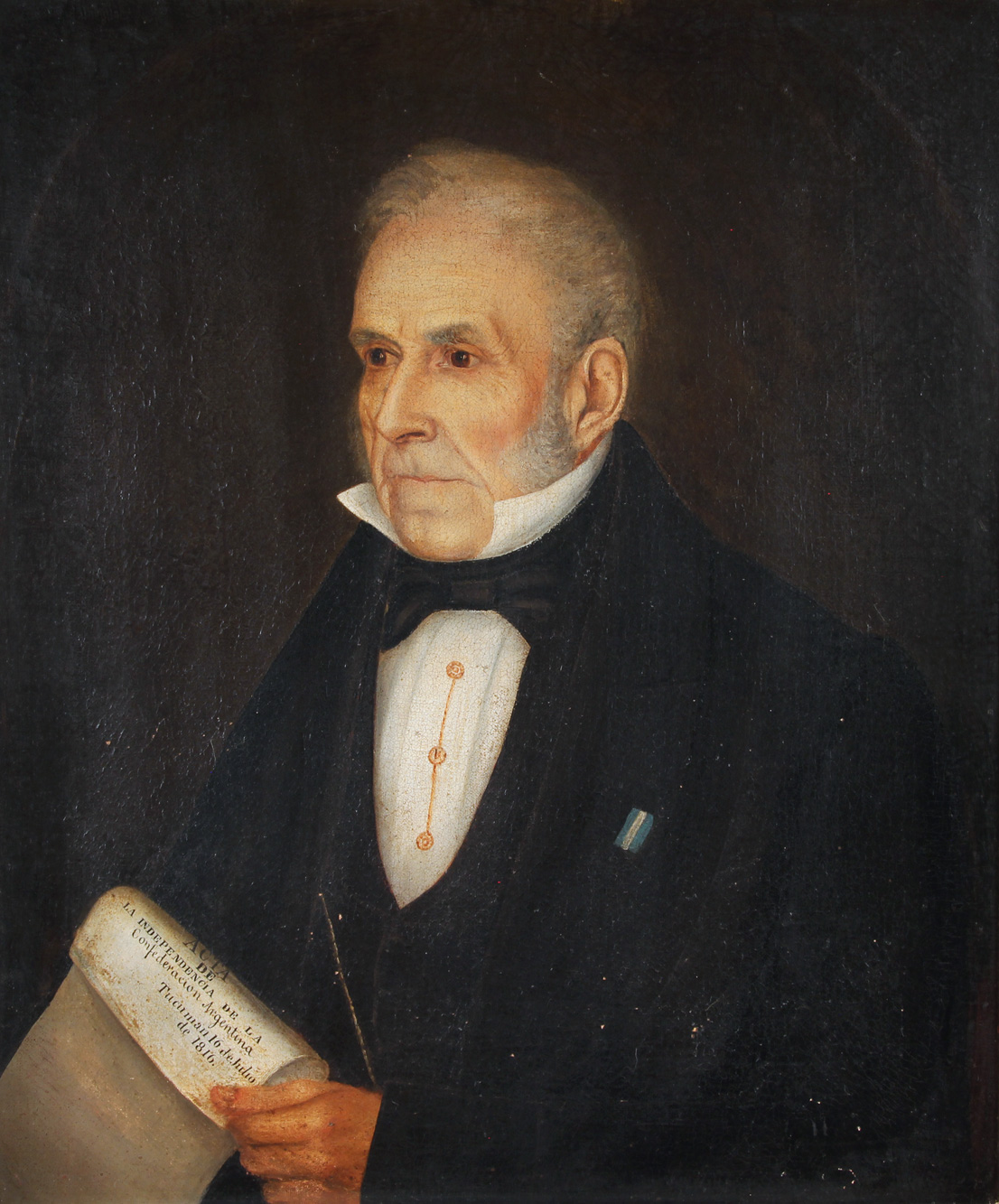
- Portrait of Pedro de Medrano holding the Argentine declaration of Independence

President of the Congress of Tucumán
- In office March 24, 1816 – May 2, 1816
- Preceded by: New office

Judge of the Real Audiencia
- In office 1810–1812

Deputy for Buenos Aires to the Assembly of the Year XIII
- In office October 3, 1812 – 1815

Senator of Buenos Aires (elected)
- In office 1819 – Did not assume office

Representative to the Provincial Legislature
- In office 1821 – Multiple terms until death

State Attorney (Fiscal)
- In office 1838–1840

President of the Chamber of Appeals
- In office 1831–1838

Personal details
- Born: 1769 Buenos Aires, Viceroyalty of the Río de la Plata (present-day Argentina)
- Died: 1840 (aged 71) Buenos Aires, Argentina
- Profession: Lawyer, Politician, Jurist
- Known for: Signatory of the Argentine Declaration of Independence

Pedro de Medrano y Cabrera (26 April 1769 – 3 November 1840) was a Uruguayan-born Argentine statesman, poet and lawyer from the House of Medrano. He was a provisional president and a representative to the Congress of Tucumán which on 9 July 1816 declared the Independence of Argentina.

== Early life ==
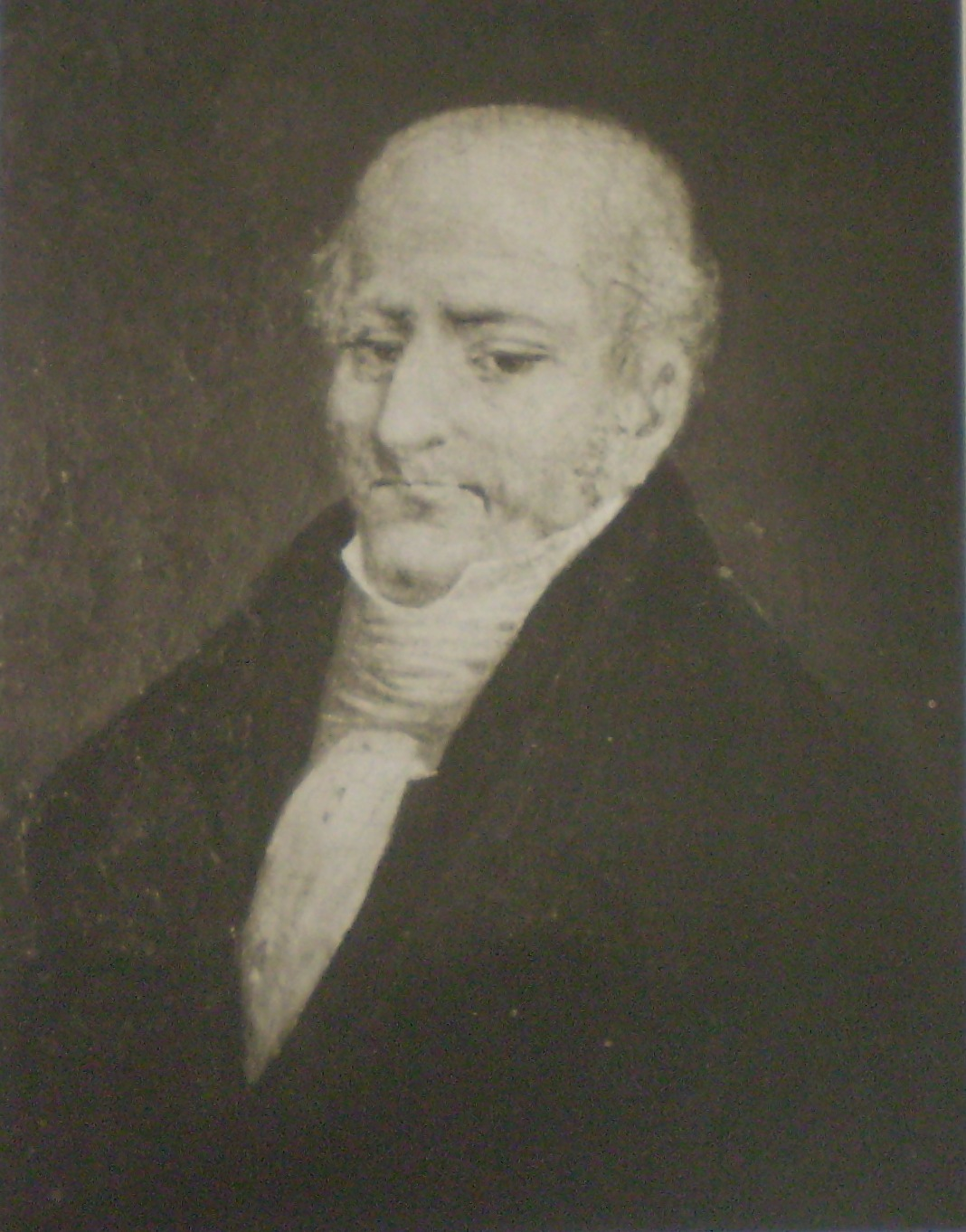
Portrait of the statesman Pedro de Medrano

Pedro de Medrano y Cabrera was born on April 26, 1769, on Gorriti Island in San Fernando de Maldonado, Uruguay. His birth occurred while his father, Pedro de Medrano y de la Plaza, was temporarily stationed there by Governor Francisco de Paula Bucareli. His father was a Treasury official in Buenos Aires.

== Education ==
Pedro returned to Buenos Aires to begin his early education and later continued his studies at the Colegio de Monserrat in Córdoba, which he entered in 1781. He pursued higher learning at the University of Charcas, becoming known as a brilliant orator. He graduated on May 2, 1789, with degrees in Canon Law and Civil Law.

== Career ==
In 1810 he was appointed an oidor of the Real Audiencia of Buenos Aires. That same year he participated in the May Revolution at the Cabildo Abierto.

=== May revolution, auditor of the War Council ===
During the May Revolution of 1810, Medrano was an active supporter of the patriotic cause. On June 15, 1810, he was appointed as the auditor of the War Council.

=== Judge of the Audiencia and deputy for Buenos Aires ===
Shortly after, on June 23, he became a judge of the Audiencia, and on June 27, he was named a judge of assets and deceased estates. He was also nominated for the position of prosecutor of the Audiencia of Charcas but declined. Medrano's political career advanced when he was elected deputy for Buenos Aires to the Assembly of the Year XIII on October 3, 1812.

=== Attempted restoration of the Spanish Monarchy ===
In 1814, he was part of a diplomatic mission led by Manuel Belgrano to Spain for the restoration of King Ferdinand VII. In April 1815, he joined the Junta de Observación, contributing to the drafting of the Provisional Statute.

=== Deputy and President of the Congress in Tucumán ===
On August 22, 1815, Medrano was elected as a national deputy for the National Congress in Tucumán. He was one of the authors of the 1815 provisional statute of Argentina.

He was elected by Buenos Aires to the Tucumán Congress in 1816 for the declaration, serving as the first president of the Congress and giving the inaugural speech.

He served as the provisional president from March 24 to May 2, 1816, delivered the inaugural address, and administered the oath to other congressmen. He was recognized for his oratory skills and involvement in various committees. His term as a deputy ended when the Congress moved to Buenos Aires in 1817.

In 1819, Medrano was proclaimed elected senator under the new Constitution, but political turmoil prevented him from taking office.

=== Representative of the provincial legislature, secretary of the provincial Junta of representatives ===
By 1821, he was elected as a representative to the provincial legislature, serving as secretary and later re-elected as deputy in several terms until his death. Medrano was secretary of the provincial junta of representatives in 1821 and a deputy on two occasions.

=== Fiscal and president of the Chamber of Appeals ===
He served as fiscal (state attorney) from 1838 and president of the Chamber of Appeals. He was a friend and ally of Juan Manuel de Rosas.

=== Consultative Senate ===
In 1829, he was appointed to the consultative Senate by General Viamonte but resigned due to disagreements over the institution's political direction.

=== Chamber judge and president of the Appeals Court ===
In 1831, Medrano was named a chamber judge and later became the president of the Appeals Court on June 28 of the same year.

=== Board of theologians and state prosecutor ===
In 1833, he joined a board of theologians, canons, and jurists created by the government for ecclesiastical advice. He was appointed state prosecutor in 1838.

== Death and legacy ==
Pedro de Medrano died on November 3, 1840. His funeral took place on November 25 at the Cathedral, led by his brother, Bishop Mariano de Medrano. In recognition of his friendship, Rosas decreed the construction of a monument in his honor at the Cementerio del Norte. Unfortunately, due to a lack of resources, the monument was never constructed.

== Family ==
=== Paternal ancestry ===
Pedro de Medrano was the son of Don Pedro de Medrano de la Plaza, born in Navarrete, La Rioja, Spain. His father married Victoriana Ana de Cabrera Saabedra on June 29, 1764, in Buenos Aires, part of the Gobernación del Río de la Plata within the Spanish Empire. Victoriana Ana de Cabrera Saabedra was baptized on January 15, 1744, in Buenos Aires.

His father was born in 1728 in the Parroquia Santa María de la Asunción, Navarrete, La Rioja, Spain. His father died on 20 February 1795 in Buenos Aires, Argentina. His mother was born in 1723, in Navarrete, La Rioja.

His paternal grandfather Pedro de Medrano y Corral, born in 1709 in Navarrete, La Rioja, Spain, was the husband of María de la Plaza Otárola, born in March 1704, also in Navarrete.

=== Maternal ancestry ===
His maternal grandparents were Lucas de la Plata (born in Otálora de la Plaza in October 1667, Navarrete, La Rioja,) and Doña Ana de Marcos Mayoral Ruiz de Villalba, born in March 1670, in Navarrete, La Rioja, Spain.

=== Buenos Aires branch ===
The Buenos Aires branch of the Medrano family resided in Villa de Navarrete, La Rioja, from ancient times. This family has extensive ancestry and descendants in the Río de la Plata region, South America. Notable descendants are Pedro de Medrano and his son Martin de Medrano y Arandia from the late 16th century; followed by his son Pedro de Medrano y Nestares, and his son Pedro de Medrano y Fernández Majarres. His son Pedro de Medrano y Gómez del Valle from the 17th century follows the line. Likewise, his son Pedro de Medrano y Corral follows, along with his son Pedro de Medrano y de la Plaza Otálora from the 18th century, who was the father of Pedro Jose de Medrano y Cabrera, Mariano José de Medrano y Cabrera (8 September 1767) bishop of Buenos Aires [es], and Capitán Don Martín José de Medrano y Cabrera, who had numerous offspring.

== Poet ==
Aside from his legal and political achievements, Medrano was also noted for his contributions to poetry and oratory. His works include the political romance "Carta de Celio a Armesto," which criticized unitarians and the December 1, 1828, revolution. He also authored "La Martiniana" and an introduction to "Poema y la gloriosa Expedición a los Desiertos del Sud" in 1833 and 1834, though the latter remained incomplete.

== Ideology ==
Politically, he was a supporter of the Federalist Party and a personal friend of Juan Manuel de Rosas.
