= Tomás de Anchorena =

Argentine statesman and lawyer

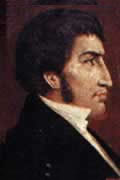
- Born: 29 November 1783
- Died: 29 April 1847 (aged 63)
- Occupation(s): statesman and lawyer

Tomás Manuel de Anchorena (29 November 1783 – 29 April 1847) was an Argentine statesman and lawyer. He was a representative to the Congress of Tucumán which on 9 July 1816 declared the Independence of Argentina.

Anchorena was born in Buenos Aires and studied at the Real Colegio de San Carlos, graduating as doctor in law at the University of Charcas around 1807. Upon his return he participated in the Buenos Aires Cabildo of 1810 and supported the revolutionary cause.

Anchorena served as secretary to General Manuel Belgrano and in 1815 he was elected by city of Buenos Aires to the Tucumán Congress, highly involved and present in 1816 for the declaration. He was active in the politics of Buenos Aires Province and served as government minister for foreign relations during the first term of Juan Manuel de Rosas.
