= Juan Agustín Maza =

Argentine politician (1784–1830)

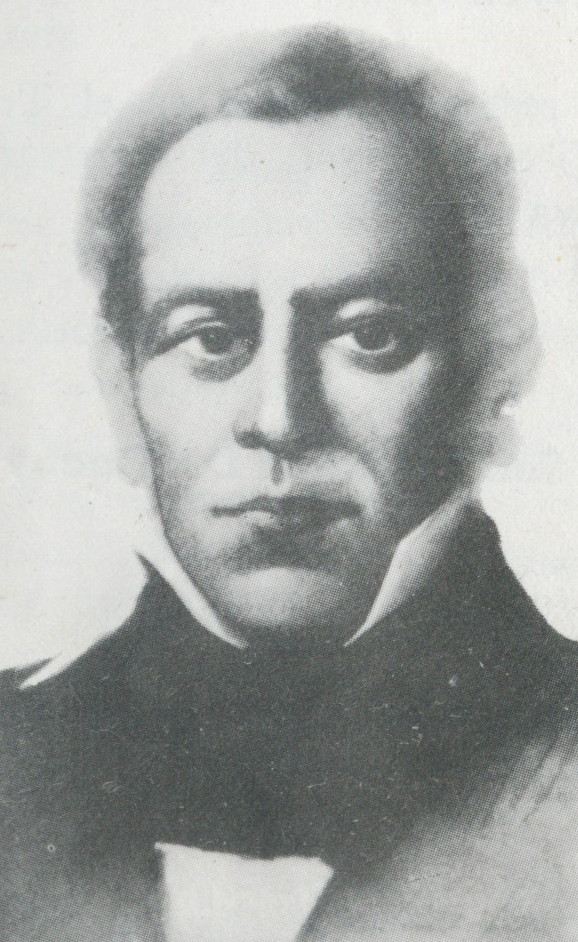
Juan Agustín Maza

Juan Agustín Maza (4 May 1784 – 11 June 1830) was an Argentine statesman and lawyer. He was a representative to the Congress of Tucumán which on 9 July 1816 declared the Independence of Argentina.

Maza was born in Mendoza and studied there, then received his doctorate in jurisprudence at the Royal University of San Felipe, Chile. He worked in Mendoza until the events of the May Revolution in 1810.

In 1815, Maza was elected to the Cabildo of Mendoza and actively assisted José de San Martín. He was elected by Mendoza to the Tucumán Congress and served in 1816 for the declaration. After the Congress moved to Buenos Aires, he served as president of the body in November 1817. He resigned his mandate in 1818 and returned to his hometown to teach.

In 1830, Videla Castillo was sent by General Paz to take charge of the government. Maza, a leading Federalist, left for the campaign, and was killed by natives at Chacay.
