= Pedro Francisco de Uriarte =

Argentine statesman and priest (1758–1839)

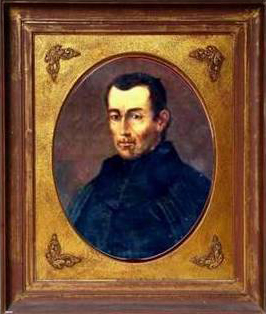
Pedro Francisco de Uriarte

Pedro Francisco Uriarte (June 29, 1758 – August 30, 1839) was an Argentine statesman and priest. He was a representative to the Congress of Tucumán which on 9 July 1816 declared the Independence of Argentina.

Uriarte was born in Santiago del Estero and was taught at the local Convent of San Francisco. He studied arts and theology at the Jesuit University of Córdoba, and was ordained in 1782, becoming a sub-deacon in 1783, becoming a priest the same year. In 1786 he became chaplain in Buenos Aires of the Santa Casa de los Ejercicios. In 1793 he became parish priest of Loreto.

Uriarte was elected to represent Santiago del Estero in the Tucumán Congress and served for the declaration in 1816. When the Congress was dissolved in 1820, he and his colleagues were imprisoned as traitors. He returned to his parish of Loreto for the rest of his life. He died whilst giving mass for Saint Rosa of Lima and was buried in the church. His remains were rescued when a flood destroyed the building, and are now buried in the new church.
