= Mariano Sánchez de Loria =

Argentinian politician

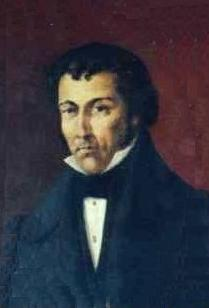

Mariano Sánchez de Loria (24 September 1774–2 August 1842) was a Bolivian-born statesman and lawyer. He was a representative to the Congress of Tucumán which on 9 July 1816 declared the Independence of Argentina.

Sánchez de Loria was born in Chuquisaca and gained his doctorate in jurisprudence and canonical laws at the university there. He supported the revolution in that city in 1809 and was elected by Charcas to the Tucumán Congress, serving in 1816 for the declaration. He backed the idea of an Incan constitutional monarchy for the United Provinces of the River Plate.

After the Congress moved to Buenos Aires, Sánchez de Loria continued his work there. Around 1817 his wife died and he returned to his hometown and was ordained a priest, becoming a canon at Charcas Cathedral. When he died he was a priest at Tacobamba in Potosí.
