= José Ignacio Thames =

Argentine statesman and priest (1762–1832)

José Ignacio Thames (August 15, 1762 – February 9, 1832) was an Argentine statesman and priest. He was a representative to the Congress of Tucumán which on July 9, 1816 declared the Independence of Argentina.

Thames was born in San Miguel de Tucumán to José Ignacio Thames and María Josefa Gutiérrez. He studied in Córdoba, receiving his doctorate in 1784, and was ordained. He returned to Tucumán then moved on to Salta, where he became a priest in the cathedral in 1813.

Thames chaired the electoral junta for Salta that elected its representatives to the Tucumán Congress. He himself was elected by Tucumán to the Congress and served in 1816 for the declaration.
