= Mariano Boedo =

Argentine statesman and soldier

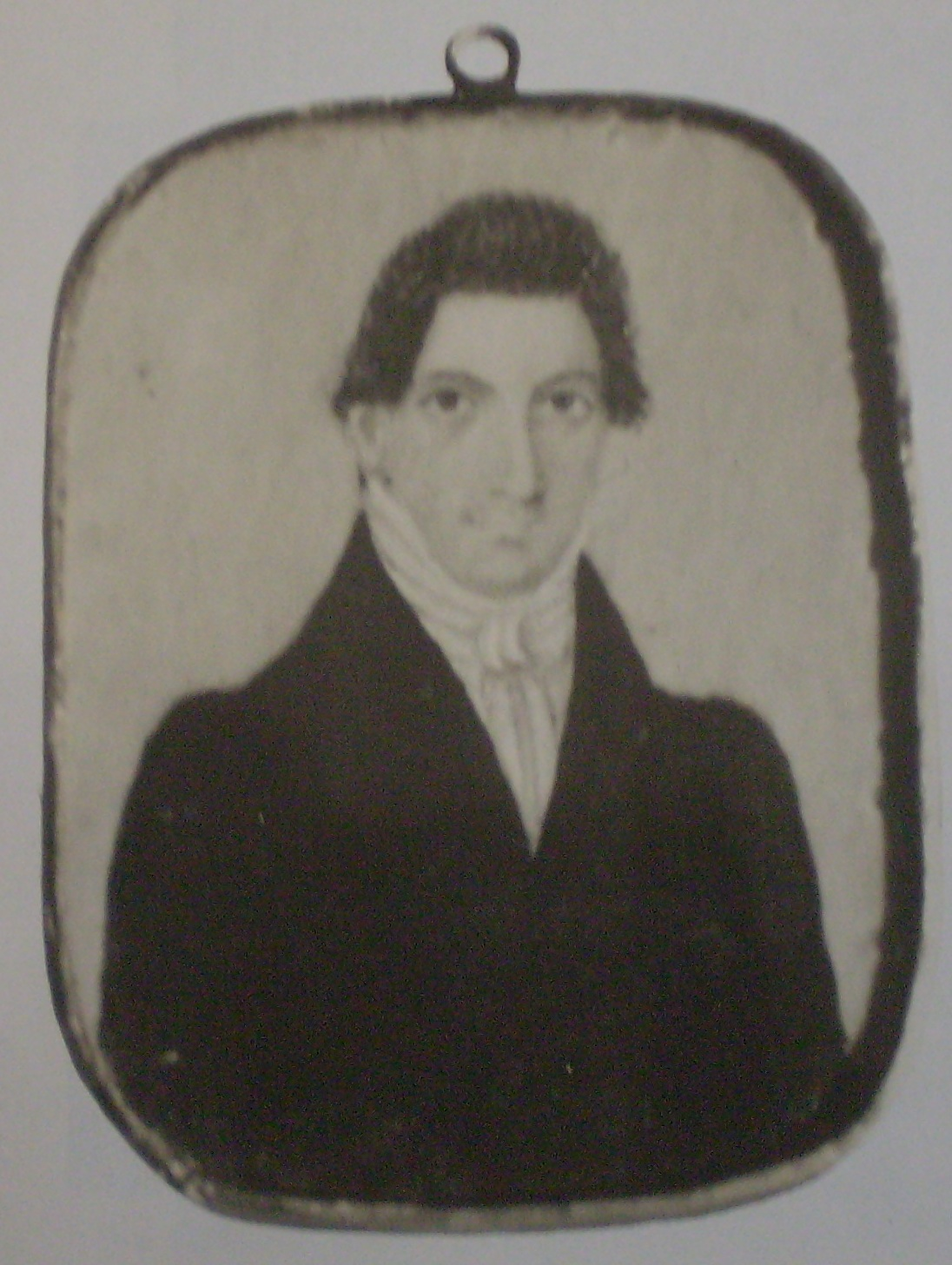
Mariano Boedo

Mariano Joaquin Boedo, born Mariano Joaquin de Boedo y de Aguirre, (25 July 1782 – 9 April 1819), was an Argentine statesman and soldier. He was a representative to the Congress of Tucumán which on 9 July 1816 declared the Independence of Argentina, signing the Declaration of Independence as a vice president of the Congress.

Boedo was born in Salta. His father was Antonio de Boedo y Garcia and his mother was María Magdalena de Aguirre y de Aguirre-Calvo de Mendoza, who belonged to one of Latin America oldest aristocratic families. Boedo was a descendant through his mother of Francisco de Aguirre, a conquistador of Chile, the son of Constanza de Meneses, who was a great-granddaughter of Juan Alfonso Téllez de Meneses IV conde de Barcelos y I de Ourém.[3] [4]

Boedo was sent to Córdoba at a young age to study at the Loreto Seminary. He studied further at the Universidad Mayor Real y Pontificia San Francisco Xavier, Chuquisaca and became a lawyer in 1805, befriending Mariano Moreno there. They collaborated in the independence movement, in particular developing revolutionary propaganda. He became a member of Salta's cabildo in 1813 on the request of Manuel Belgrano, and took charge of the finances and administration of Salta Province. He was elected by the province to the Tucumán Congress and was the vice president of the Congress in 1816 for the declaration. He stepped down in 1818 due to ill health and died the following year.

Boedo took an active role in the military campaigns in the northern provinces with Martín Miguel de Güemes. He also served as governor of Córdoba.

The barrio of Boedo in Buenos Aires was named in memory of Mariano Boedo.
