= Eduardo Pérez Bulnes =

Argentine politician

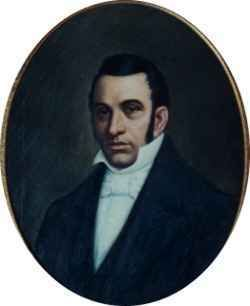
Eduardo Pérez Bulnes

Eduardo Pérez Bulnes (12 October 1785 –3 March 1851) was an Argentine statesman. He was a representative to the Congress of Tucumán which on 9 July 1816 declared the Independence of Argentina.

Pérez Bulnes was born in Córdoba into a landowning family and was educated at the College of Monserrat. He was a member of the Córdoba cabildo and served as head of police.

He was elected to represent Córdoba in the Tucumán Congress and served for the declaration in 1816. Along with his Córdoba colleagues, he was one of the few federalists in the Congress, speaking for a system of strong autonomous provinces. He was a supporter of the federalist José Gervasio Artigas and was one of two deputies who declined to follow the Congress to Buenos Aires.

Pérez Bulnes also represented Córdoba in the general congress of 1826. He worked with General Paz when he took over Córdoba's government, retiring from public life after Paz's fall.
