= Antonio Sáenz =

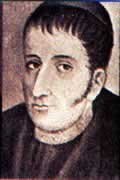

Antonio Sáenz (June 6, 1780 – July 22, 1825) was an Argentine statesman, educator and cleric. He was a representative to the Congress of Tucumán of July 9, 1816, which declared the Independence of Argentina. He was the first rector of the University of Buenos Aires.

Sáenz was born in Buenos Aires. He studied at the Real Colegio de San Carlos between 1794 and 1800, gained his degree in 1802, and became a doctor in law in Chuquisaca in 1804, having been ordained as a priest some years before. In 1804, he entered the Academia Carolina as a practising lawyer. He became shortly afterwards a teacher of theology, law and philosophy.

In 1805, Sáenz was appointed secretary of the church cabildo, which brought him into the public eye. His appointment was opposed by the Bishop of Buenos Aires, Benito Lué y Riega, and they fought publicly, culminating in Sáenz's imprisonment and trial. He was freed thanks to the intervention of the city's cabildo. He took part in the revolutionary events of May 1810 and represented San Luis Province in the 1813 Assembly. Thanks to his profile and links, he was also part of the Lautaro Lodge.

In 1812 it was Sáenz that found the dead body of Bishop Lue and suspicion was immediately placed on the younger priest, given the two men's history, an accusation he never shook off. The religious authorities sent him to Luján in a form of exile. He took no further part in church administration.

Sáenz was elected by Buenos Aires to the Congress of Tucumán and helped to write the declaration of independence in 1816, in his capacity as President of the Academy of Jurisprudence. In 1819 he was the Congress' President. He helped to found the University of Buenos Aires and became its first rector in 1821.
