= Foreign domination =

Foreign domination (or foreign rule) is a term used in the historiography of multiple countries to characterize successive periods of rule by foreign powers.

== China ==
China was under foreign rule in the years of the Yuan dynasty and of the Qing dynasty, having been subjugated by Mongol and Manchu elites respectively. Both dynasties however became gradually Chinese as time passed.

== Italy ==
Foreign domination is commonly used to describe the condition of foreign rule over Italian states at the beginning of the Risorgimento, when the only state left under local Italian rule was Piedmont-Sardinia (predecessor state of Italy) whereas much of the north was under the Habsburgs. All of Italy was organised in independent states from the 11th-12th century as a result of the Walk to Canossa and the Treaty of Venice, but this condition was gradually lost between the end of the Italian Wars and the balance of power established by the Congress of Vienna.

== Spain ==
Two foreign dynasties came to power in Spain, the House of Habsburg in 1516 and the House of Bourbon in 1700. However, both the Spanish Habsburgs by the time of Philip II of Spain and the Spanish Bourbons by the time of Louis I of Spain were Spanish-born monarchs.

== Vietnam ==
From the 2nd century BC until the 15th century AD, Vietnam fell under Chinese rule four times: 111 BC to 40 AD, 43 AD to 544, 602 to 939, and 1407 to 1428. These periods of foreign rule led to Vietnam being firmly embedded into the Sinosphere, in contrast with the rest of Southeast Asia which is in the Indosphere.

== Other examples ==
The term has also notably been used to refer to periods of Israeli, Eastern European, and Polish history.

== See also ==
- Colony
- Colonialism
