= Gorriti =

Coordinates: 43°03′N 1°57′W

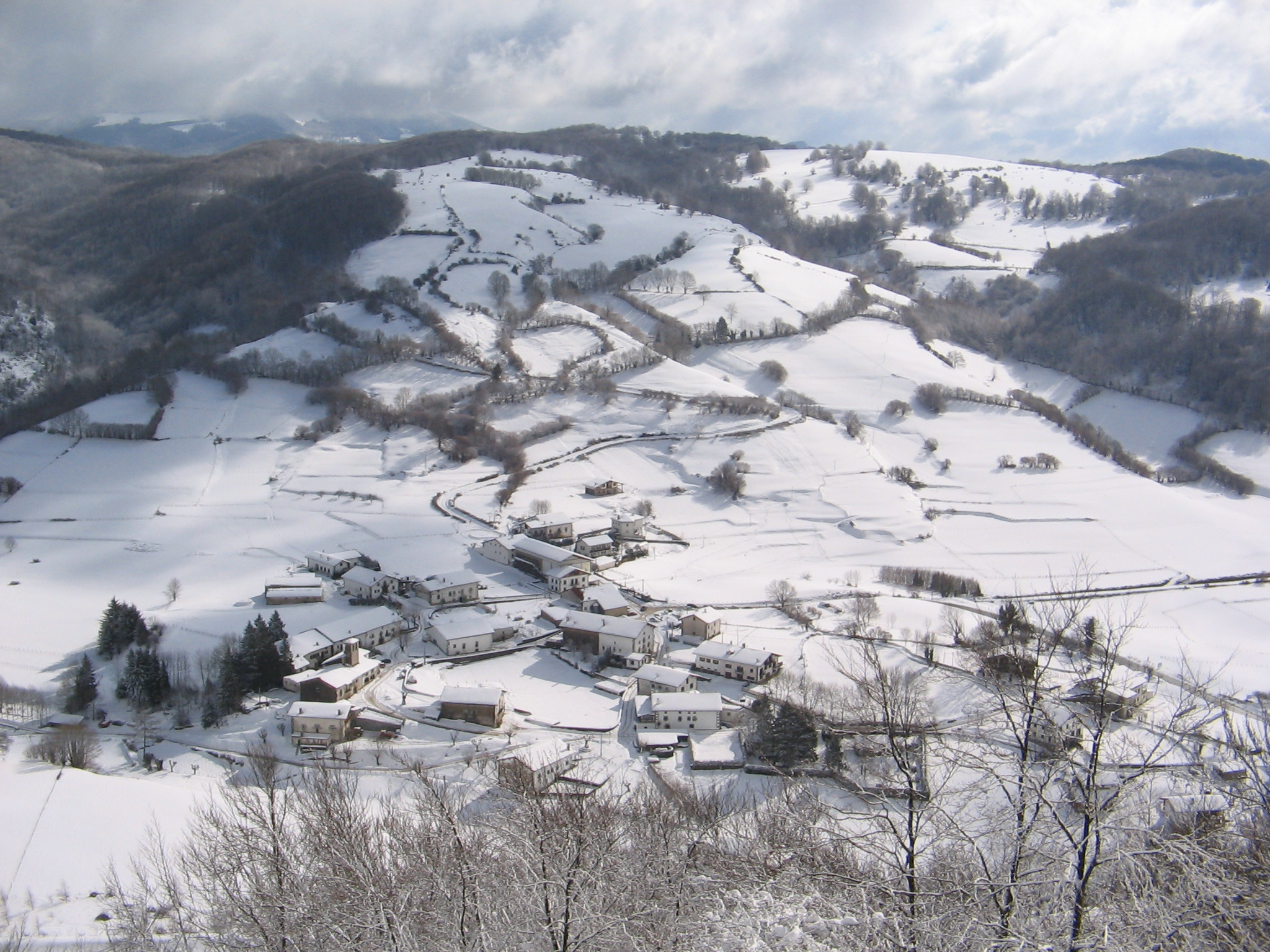
Gorriti as seen from A-15

Gorriti is a locality in Larraun, Norte de Aralar, Navarre, Spain.

Its population as of 2014 was 84 inhabitants.
