= José Andrés Pacheco de Melo =

Argentine politician

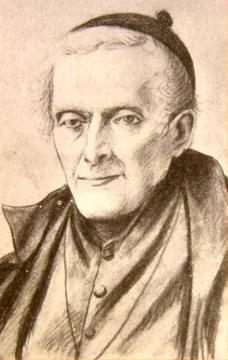

José Andrés Pacheco de Melo (17 October 1779 – approx. 1820) was an Argentine statesman and priest. He was a representative to the Congress of Tucumán which on 9 July 1816 declared the Independence of Argentina.

Pacheco de Melo was born in Salta and studied there alongside Martín Güemes. He entered the seminary of Our Lady of Loreto in Córdoba and was ordained in 1801 by Bishop Moscoso of Tucumán.

Pacheco de Melo became a priest to the Chichas, an indigenous people in the present south and southwest of Bolivia and far north of Argentina. There, he used his position to assist the revolutionary forces in Upper Peru. He was elected by the Chichas to the Tucumán Congress and was there in 1816 for the Declaration of Independence, although there had been a long debate about the legitimacy of his election.

After the Congress moved to Buenos Aires, Pacheco de Melo chaired it in 1818. He subsequently served as a government minister in Mendoza.

The year of his death is unclear, believed to have been in 1820.
