= Pedro Miguel Aráoz =

Argentine statesman and priest

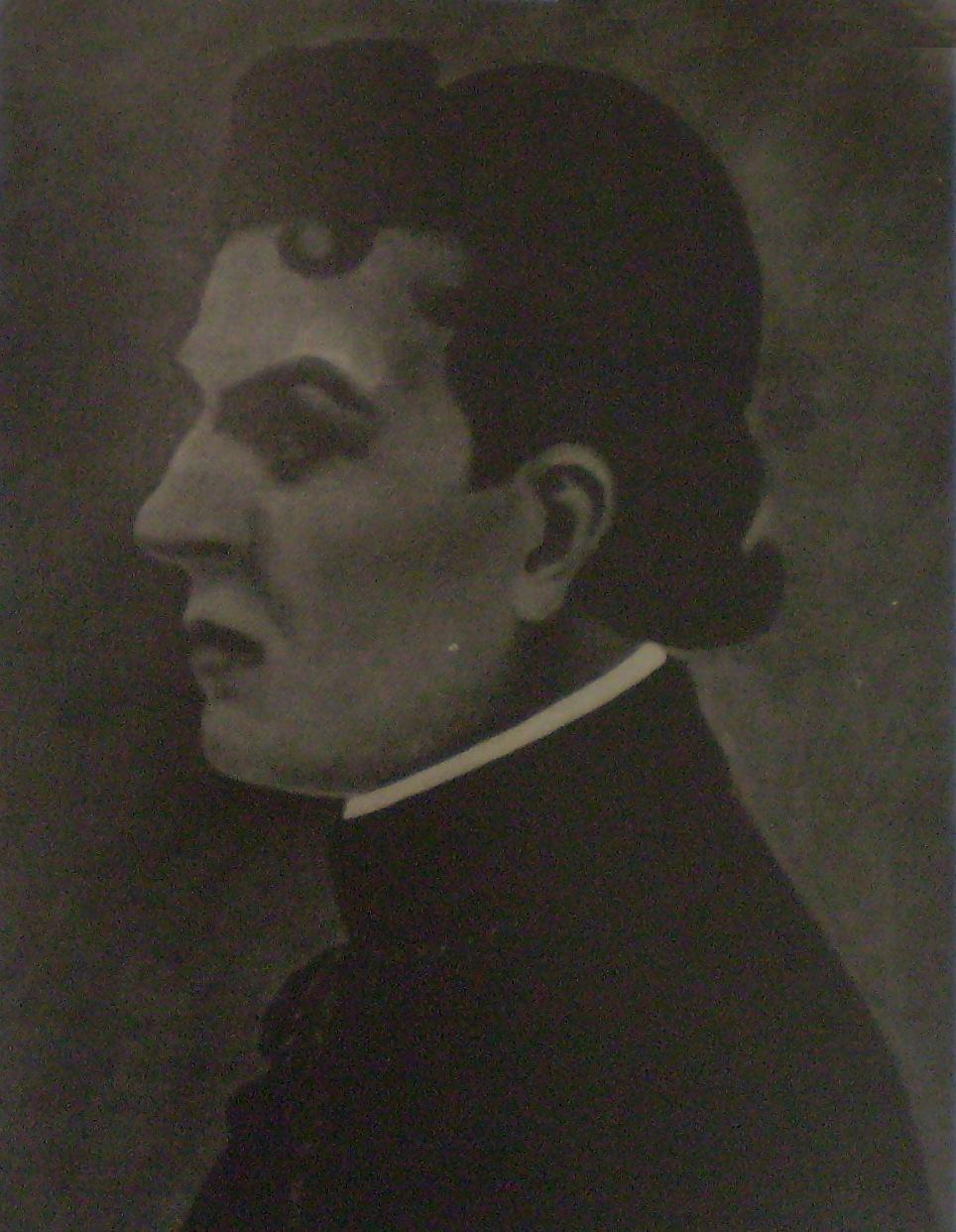
Pedro Miguel Aráoz

Pedro Miguel Aráoz (20 June 1759 – 18 June 1832) was an Argentine statesman and priest. He was a representative in the 1816 Congress of Tucumán, which declared the Independence of Argentina.

Aráoz was born in Tucumán to Pedro Antonio Aráoz and Francisca Nuñez de Herrera. He studied in Tucumán, and then was educated in theology in Buenos Aires at the Real Colegio de San Carlos. He received his doctorate in 1782 at the University of Córdoba and was ordained in Tucumán. He became rector of Tucumán Cathedral, serving until his death.

Aráoz assisted Manuel Belgrano of the Army of the North. He was elected to Congress to represent Tucumán and served in 1816 for the declaration. After the Congress moved to Buenos Aires, he resigned his mandate and returned to his hometown. He collaborated in local politics with his close relative, Bernabé Aráoz, assisting in the 1820 formation of the Republic of Tucumán and serving as a legislator in the provincial assembly. He wrote the Republic's constitution and was the editor of its first provincial newspaper. After the death of Bernabé and the collapse of the Tucumán Republic, Aráoz retired from politics.
