= Teodoro Sánchez de Bustamante =

Argentine statesman, lawyer and soldier

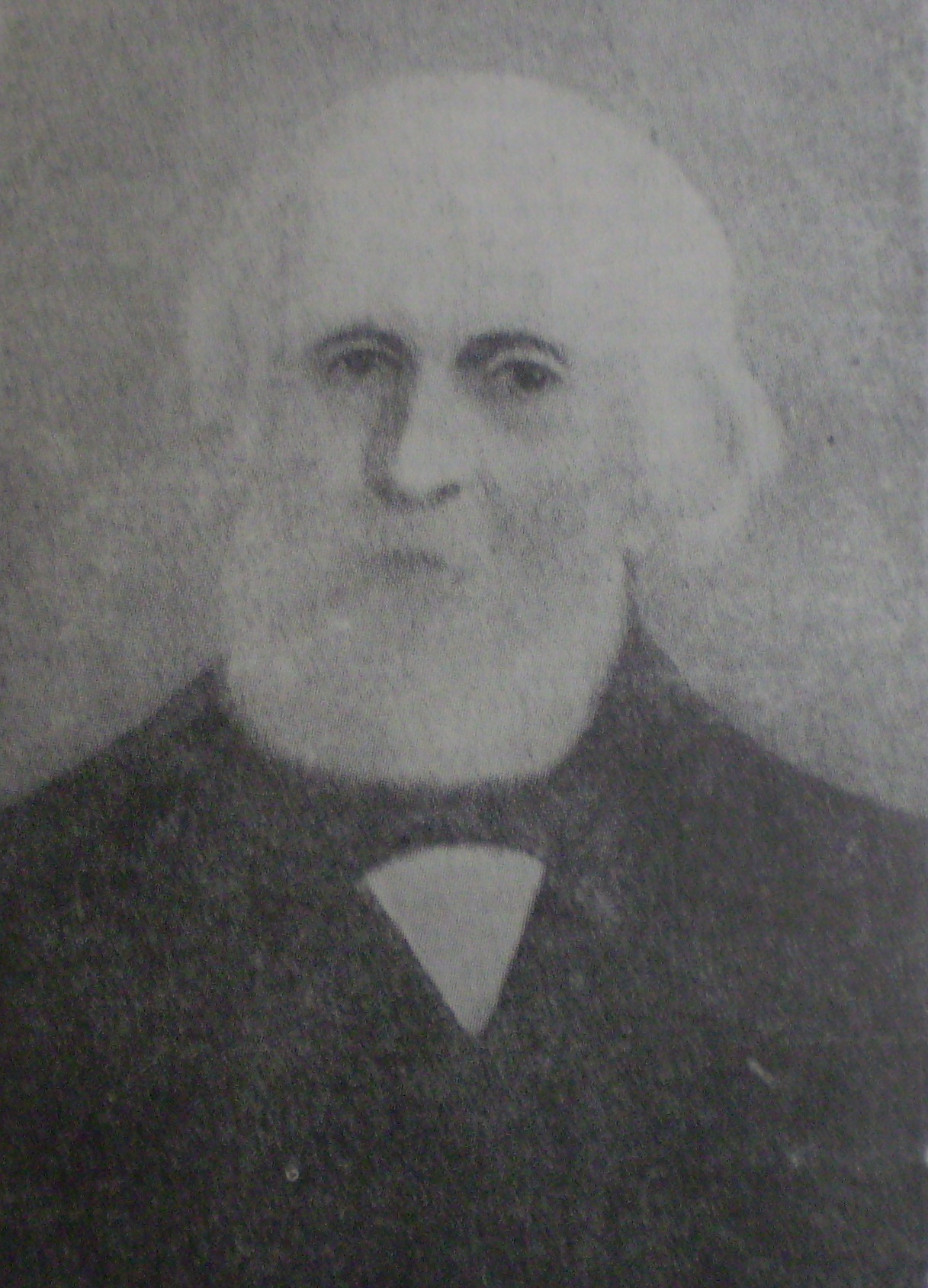
Teodoro Sánchez de Bustamante

Teodoro Sánchez de Bustamante (10 January 1778–1 May 1851) was an Argentine statesman, lawyer and soldier. He was a representative to the Congress of Tucumán which on 9 July 1816 declared the Independence of Argentina.

== Biography ==
Sánchez de Bustamante was born in Jujuy to Manuel Sánchez de Bustamante and María Tomasa González de Araujo y Ortiz de Zárate, and was a descendant of the founder of Jujuy, Francisco Argañaraz y Murguía. He studied in Salta at the school of José León Cabezón, then in Buenos Aires at the Real Colegio de San Carlos. He qualified as a lawyer in 1804 at the University of Charcas (now Bolivia) and was named Relator of the Audiencia Real there, and later President of the Forensic Academy.

Sánchez de Bustamante took part in the 1809 uprising in Chuquisaca that pre-dated the 1810 May Revolution in Buenos Aires. The leader of the revolutionaries, Coronel Arenales, leader of the revolutionaries, named him captain in the Compañía de Practicantes. The uprising was suppressed by Mariscal Nieto and the leaders captured and sent to Callao, but Sánchez de Bustamante managed to flee to Jujuy. He travelled to Buenos Aires soon after the May Revolution and met his friend Mariano Moreno. Moreno named him as attorney of the Audiencia, a position which he held until 1811, before returning to his hometown as general assistant of the city's Cabildo and courts.

In 1813 General Manuel Belgrano named him as secretary of the Army of the North in the campaign in modern Peru and Bolivia. Belgrano's successor, General José de San Martín, promoted him to be his secretary, and Rondeau made him secretary-general in 1814. He participated in the Battle of Sipe Sipe in November 1815.

In 1815 Sánchez de Bustamante was elected by Jujuy to the Tucumán Congress and served in 1816 for the declaration. In 1819, he became president of the congress until it dissolved in 1820. He served as government secretary to Juan Antonio Álvarez de Arenales in 1824, and served as acting governor of Salta when Alvarez travelled to Upper Peru. He was governor of Jujuy from 1826 to 1827.

Having left politics, Sánchez de Bustamante moved to Sucre in 1831 to teach. He became Rector of the Colegio Mayor de Santa Cruz in 1834 but retired in 1837 due to ill health. He died in Santa Cruz de la Sierra in 1851; in 1916 his remains were re-buried in the Cathedral of Jujuy.
