= Congress of Tucumán =

1816 congress where South American states declared independence from Spain

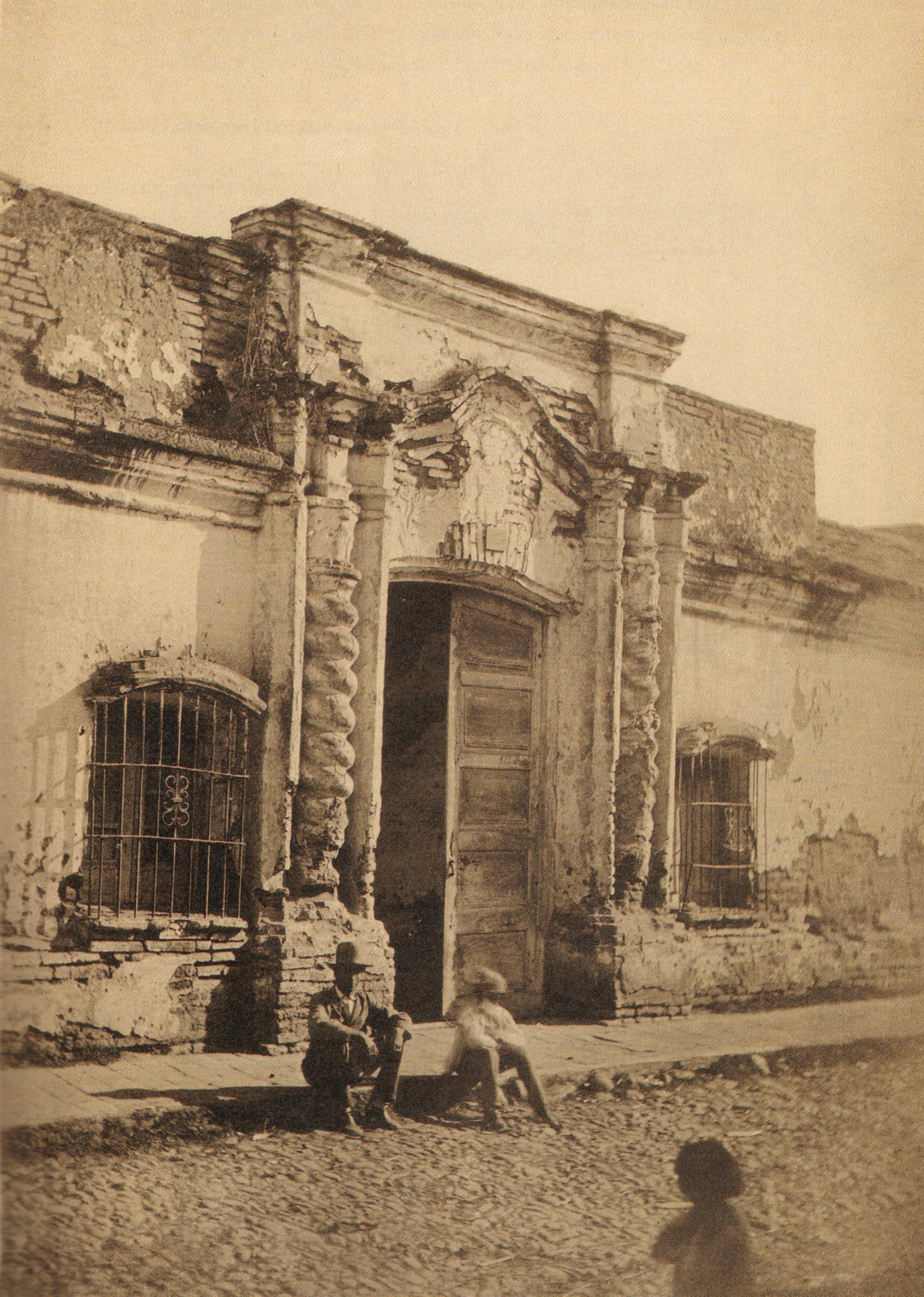
Site of the Congress of Tucumán. Restored in 1941, it was made a National Monument.

The Congress of Tucumán (Spanish: Congreso de Tucumán) was the representative assembly, initially meeting in San Miguel de Tucumán, that declared the independence of the United Provinces of South America (modern-day Argentina, Uruguay, part of Bolivia) on July 9, 1816, from the Spanish Empire.

== Overview ==
Following the May Revolution of 1810, the Viceroy had been replaced by the Primera Junta. The provinces had been moving towards full independence but royalist forces from the Viceroyalty of Peru have had the upper hand in the Upper Peru and were threatening the revolution.

On April 15, 1815, a revolution ended the mandate of Carlos María de Alvear and called a General Congress. Delegate deputies, each representing 15,000 inhabitants, were sent from all the provinces to the sessions that started on March 24, 1816. Nevertheless, some territories that formerly belonged to the Viceroyalty of the River Plate did not take part in the Congress: the delegates from the Banda Oriental ('Eastern Bank', today Uruguay) and other Liga Federal provinces, faithful to the democratic federalist project of José Gervasio Artigas were rejected based on formalities; Paraguay had already proclaimed its independence from Spain and remained isolated from the United Provinces politics. Representatives from Upper Peru Provinces (current Bolivia) were, however, present.

The congress was inaugurated in the house of Francisca Bazán de Laguna, consisted of 33 deputies, and its presidency rotated on a monthly basis. Because the congress had freedom to select the agenda, there were endless discussions. On July 9, it declared the independence of the United Provinces of South America, a name that was intended to appeal and eventually incorporate other Spanish American independentist regions that were not represented at the Congress.

At that time, the President of the Congress was Francisco Narciso de Laprida, delegate from San Juan Province. Subsequent discussions centred on the form of government that the young state should have and were the Congress and the executive power should reside.

The congress continued its work in Buenos Aires since 1817 and issued a Constitution in 1819, but the Constitution was rejected and the Congress was dissolved in 1820 after the Federal League Provinces of Santa Fe and Entre Ríos defeated a diminished Directorship army at the Battle of Cepeda, that staged the Unitarian (v.g. Centralist) versus Federal conflict on the battlefield.

The house where the declaration made was rebuilt and is now a museum and monument. It is known as the "House of Tucumán".

== Signatories of the declaration ==
- Francisco Narciso de Laprida, Deputy for San Juan, President
- Mariano Boedo, Deputy for Salta, Vice-president
- José Mariano Serrano, Deputy for Charcas (present Bolivia), Secretary
- Juan José Paso, Deputy for Buenos Aires, Secretary
- Dr. Antonio Sáenz, Deputy for Buenos Aires
- Dr. José Darragueira, Deputy for Buenos Aires
- Friar Cayetano José Rodríguez, Deputy for Buenos Aires
- Dr. Pedro Medrano, Deputy for Buenos Aires
- Dr. Manuel Antonio Acevedo, Deputy for Catamarca
- Dr. José Ignacio de Gorriti, Deputy for Salta
- Dr. José Andrés Pacheco de Melo, Deputy for Chichas (present Bolivia)
- Dr. Teodoro Sánchez de Bustamante, Deputy for Jujuy
- Eduardo Pérez Bulnes, Deputy for Córdoba
- Tomás Godoy Cruz, Deputy for Mendoza
- Dr. Pedro Miguel Aráoz, Deputy for Tucumán
- Dr. Esteban Agustín Gazcón, Deputy for Buenos Aires
- Pedro Francisco de Uriarte, Deputy for Santiago del Estero
- Pedro León Gallo, Deputy for Santiago del Estero
- Pedro Ignacio Rivera, Deputy for Mizque (present Bolivia)
- Dr. Mariano Sánchez de Loria, Deputy for Charcas (present Bolivia)
- Dr. José Severo Malabia, Deputy for Charcas (present Bolivia)
- Dr. Pedro Ignacio de Castro Barros, Deputy for La Rioja
- Lic. Gerónimo Salguero de Cabrera y Cabrera, Deputy for Córdoba
- Dr. José Colombres, Deputy for Catamarca
- Dr. José Ignacio Thames, Deputy for Tucumán
- Friar Justo de Santa María de Oro, Deputy for San Juan
- José Antonio Cabrera, Deputy for Córdoba
- Dr. Juan Agustín Maza, Deputy for Mendoza
- Tomás Manuel de Anchorena, Deputy for Buenos Aires
