= Francisco Narciso de Laprida =

Argentine lawyer and politician

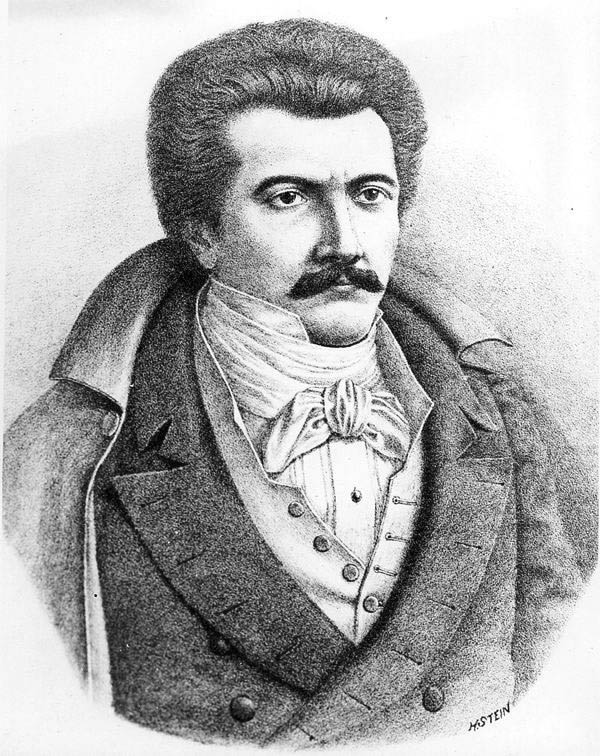
- Portrait of Laprida by Henri Stein
- Born: October 28, 1786; San Juan
- Died: September 22, 1829 (aged 42); Mendoza, Argentina
- Occupation: Lawyer

Francisco Narciso de Laprida (October 28, 1786 in San Juan – September 22, 1829) was an Argentine lawyer and politician. He was a representative for San Juan at the Congress of Tucumán, and its president on July 9, 1816, when the Declaration of Independence of Argentina was declared.

== Biography ==
Laprida started his studies at the Real Colegio de San Carlos in Buenos Aires, after which he moved to Santiago de Chile to study law at the Universidad de San Felipe, where he graduated in 1810. He participated in the Cabildo Abierto in Chile, one of the first steps towards the independence of that country. In 1812 he returned to San Juan, where he was named trustee of the Cabildo government house.

As such, Laprida collaborated with José de San Martín in the organization of the Ejército de los Andes. Because of his education in law and as an important local figure, he was sent to the Tucumán Congress in 1815 as provincial deputy, together with Fray Justo Santa María de Oro. As the congress had a rotating presidency, Laprida was selected for the presidency on July 1, and was still its president 8 days later, when the independence of the country was declared.

He returned to San Juan at the end of the deliberations, where he served as acting governor replacing José Ignacio de la Roza. As interim governor, he took a determined and tough line against the dissidents. At the end of his internship he represented his province again in 1824 at the General Constituent Congress, being its president for some months.

Like many other nineteenth century Argentines prominent in public life, he was a freemason.

As a member of the Unitarian Party, the execution of Manuel Dorrego by Juan Lavalle was a hard blow, after which Laprida returned to San Juan. He later had to flee again towards Mendoza Province, to escape Manuel Oribe and Facundo Quiroga's forces. On September 22, 1829, the men of José Félix Aldao, shortly after defeating the unitarian commander Juan Agustín Moyano, reached Laprida's coach and slit his throat; his body was never found.

He is also the great-great-great uncle of Argentine writer Jorge Luis Borges.
