= José Ignacio de Gorriti =

Argentine politician (1770–1835)

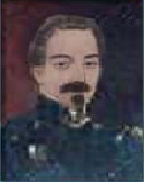

General José Ignacio de Gorriti (1770 – 9 November 1835) was an Argentine statesman, soldier and lawyer. He was a representative to the Congress of Tucumán which on 9 July 1816 declared the Independence of Argentina.

Gorriti was born in Jujuy in 1770 to Feliciana Coeto and Ignacio de Gorriti Navarro, members of the local gentry. He and his brother, Juan Ignacio de Gorriti (later a prominent priest and lawmaker), studied at the Montserrat School in Córdoba. In 1788 he entered the University of Chuquisaca, graduating in canonical and civil law. He was forced to return to Jujuy on the death of his father to look after the family and their interests. In 1802 he married Facunda Zuviría.

In 1810, following the May Revolution, Gorriti became an active and vocal supporter of the revolutionary cause. He joined the Unitarian Party. He campaigned with the Army of the North and alongside General Martín Güemes, and was subsequently elected by a grateful Salta to the Tucumán Congress, serving in 1816 for the declaration. When the Congress moved to Buenos Aires in 1817, he resigned to continue to work in Salta with Güemes. He had a distinguished role in the campaign, organising the gaucho cavalry and in 1820 won a key battle against the royalists.

Gorriti was made governor of Salta Province in 1820 and served with distinction, having a second term between 1827 and 1829. He had several further military successes both against Spanish forces and against the Federals under Juan Facundo Quiroga. Quiroga's later success, however, obliged him to go in exile to Bolivia, where he died on 9 November 1835, penniless with many children.

Gorriti's daughter was Juana Manuela Gorriti, the writer, who married future Bolivian President, Manuel Isidro Belzu.
