= Argentine Civil Wars =

Conflicts within Argentina from 1814 to 1880

- Part of the rise of the Argentine Republic
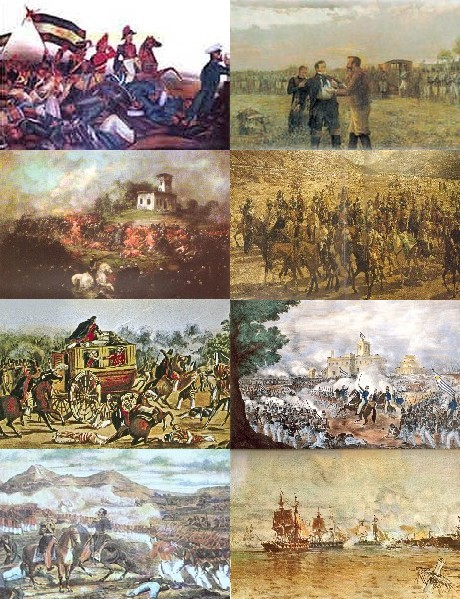
- From top left: Battle of Arroyo Grande, execution of Manuel Dorrego, Battle of Pavón, death of Juan Lavalle, murder of Facundo Quiroga, Battle of Caseros, Battle of Famaillá, Battle of Vuelta de Obligado
Date	1814–1880
Location	Argentina; Uruguay; Southern Cone
Result	Sanction of the Constitution in 1853; Federalization of Buenos Aires in 1880

Belligerents
1814–1820: Federal League; Banda Oriental; Córdoba; Entre Ríos; Corrientes; Santa Fe; Misiones Orientales; 1825–1827: Federalists; La Rioja; Córdoba; Santiago del Estero; 1828–1832: Federalists; Buenos Aires; Entre Ríos; Santa Fe; Corrientes; 1839–1852: Federalists; Argentine Confederation; White Party; Lavallejists; 1852–1862: Argentine Confederation 1868–1880: Autonomists; Autonomist Party (1868–1874); National Autonomist Party (1874–1880)	1814–1820: Directory; Buenos Aires; Tucumán; Salta; Mendoza; Catamarca; Santiago del Estero; 1825–1827: Unitarians; Buenos Aires; Catamarca; Tucumán; Salta; 1828–1832: Unitarians; Córdoba; Mendoza; Tucumán; San Luis; San Juan; La Rioja; Catamarca; Salta; Santiago del Estero; 1838–1852: Grand Army; Entre Ríos; Corrientes; Santa Fe; Colorado Party; Empire of Brazil; Exiled unitarians; 1852–1862: State of Buenos Aires 1868–1880: Liberals; Liberal Party

Commanders and leaders
José Gervasio Artigas (1814–1820); Francisco Ramírez † (1814–1821); Estanislao López (1814–1838); Carlos María de Alvear (1815–1852); José Miguel Carrera (executed) (1818–1821); Facundo Quiroga † (1820–1835); Manuel Oribe (1825–1851); Manuel Dorrego (executed) (1826–1828); Juan Manuel de Rosas (1828–1852); Justo José de Urquiza † (1835–1870); Chacho Peñaloza † (1836–1863); Ricardo López Jordán (1870–1876)	José Rondeau † (1814–1844); Juan Lavalle † (1814–1841); Bernardino Rivadavia (1821–1834); José María Paz (POW) (1829–1854); Domingo Faustino Sarmiento (1831–1874); Bartolomé Mitre (1839–1880); Fructuoso Rivera; Venancio Flores

The Argentine Civil Wars (Spanish: Guerras civiles argentinas) were a series of civil conflicts of varying intensity that took place from 1814 to 1853 in the territories of Argentina. Beginning concurrently with the Argentine War of Independence (1810 to 1818), the conflicts prevented the formation of a stable governing body until the signing of the Argentine Constitution of 1853, followed by low-frequency skirmishes that ended with the Federalization of Buenos Aires in 1880.

Initially, conflict arose from tensions over the organization and powers of the United Provinces of South America. The May 1810 revolution sparked the breakdown of the Viceroyalty's intendencies (regional administrations) into local cabildos, and was generally opposed to centralism, as manifested in its rejection of the central government being able to install and remove the governors of the new provinces. Escalation of the conflict resulted in the dissolution of the directorship and the Congress, leaving the Argentine provinces under the leadership of personalist strongmen called caudillos, and leading to sporadic skirmishes until the re-establishment of relative peace after the war between the League of the Interior and the Federal Pact. However, conflicting interests did not permit the creation of a governing body until the Pact's defeat during the Platine War.

Later conflicts centered around commercial control of the Paraná and Uruguay rivers and of Buenos Aires, the country's only port, which saw the secession of Buenos Aires from the Argentine Confederation. Re-unification subsequently became possible with the de-escalation of hostilities that occurred as the battleground moved from armed mutinies to debates within the political system of the Argentine Republic.

This period also saw heavy intervention from the Brazilian Empire, which fought against the Argentine state and provinces in multiple wars. Breakaway nations and former territories of the Viceroyalty such as the Banda Oriental, Paraguay, and Upper Peru were involved to varying degrees. Foreign powers such as the British and French empires also put heavy pressure on the fledgling nations during international wars.

== The chaos of the early 1800s ==
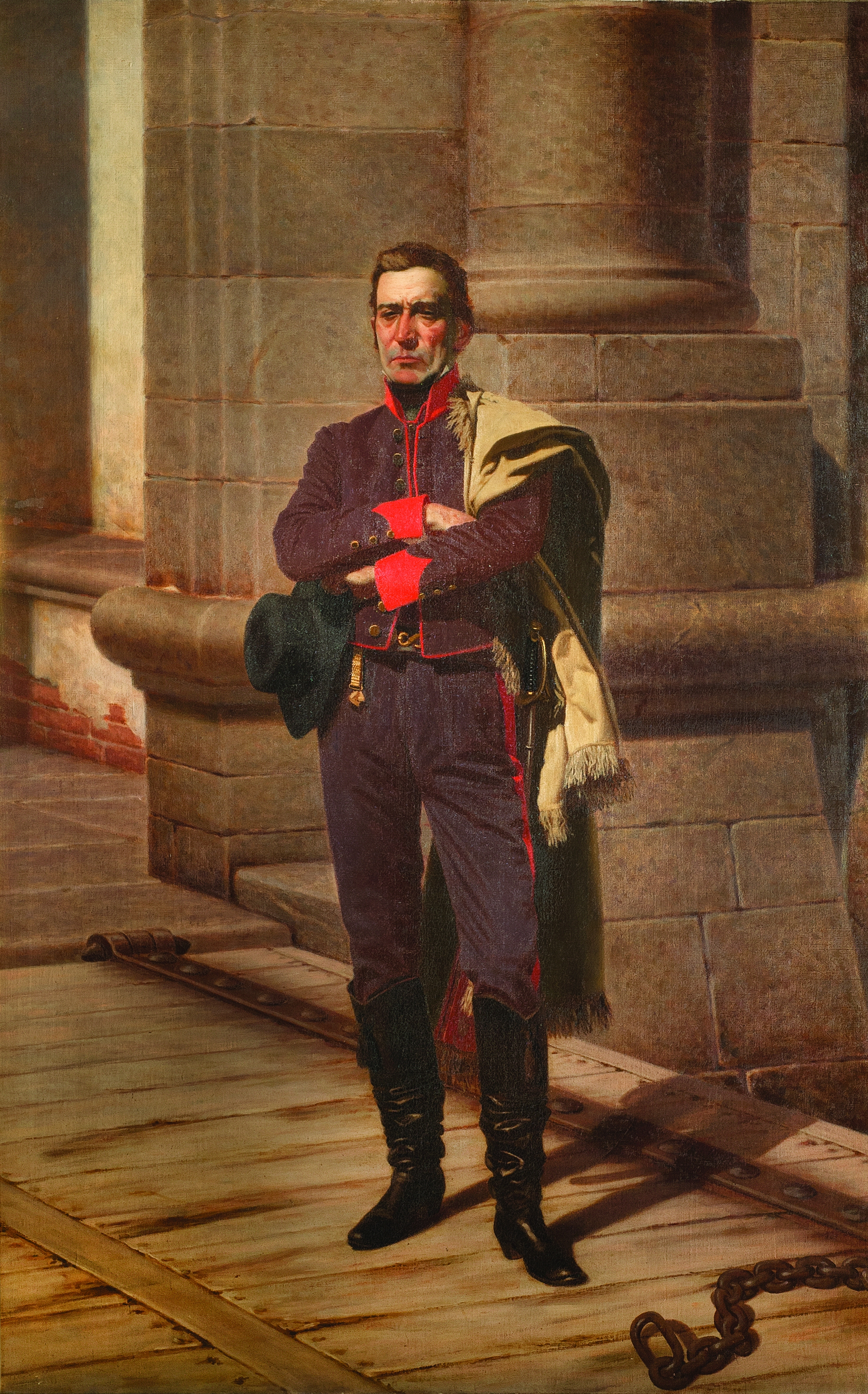
The Banda Oriental, under the liberator José Gervasio Artigas, defended the federal system until all the provinces had equal conditions.

Regionalism had long characterized the relationships among the many provinces that make up present-day Argentina, for their individual wars of independence did not lead to national unity, even though the 1810 May Revolution created the United Provinces of South America.

The first formal rupture in the United Provinces occurred in June 1814 when José Artigas established the rival Federal League from Banda Oriental, Entre Ríos, Corrientes, Misiones, and Córdoba Provinces. But the Banda Oriental was invaded in June 1816 by the Portuguese Empire, tying Artigas' army to the defence of the region. Nonetheless he could still order an armed response against the directorship of the United Provinces when they declared the centralizing Argentine Constitution of 1819. The subsequent Federal League victory at the 1820 Battle of Cepeda effectively dissolved the United Provinces government, leaving caudillos as the highest regional authorities for the remainder of the decade. But the Federal League also dissolved after the Treaty of Pilar between Buenos Aires, Santa Fe, and Entre Ríos in 1820, and the subsequent refusal of fellow federal members to aid the occupied Banda Oriental.

Following the collapse of the Federal League in the early 1820s, armed conflict escalated among the governors of the Littoral provinces. Artigas rejected the Pilar Treaty and instead signed the Avalos Treaty with the governments of Corrientes and Misiones. In May 1820 he marched his army towards Concepción del Uruguay in Entre Ríos, but was ultimately defeated by September at Misiones, and exiled to Asunción. The governor of Entre Ríos, Francisco Ramírez, effectively occupied the provinces of Corrientes and Misiones, but the signing of the Treaty of Benegas in November 1820 between Buenos Aires and Santa Fe led to the breakdown of relations between Ramírez and Santa Fe's governor, Estanislao López. The 1821 war between Corrientes and the Buenos Aires-Santa Fe alliance ended in the death of Ramírez and the signing of the defensive Quadrilateral Treaty between Buenos Aires, Santa Fe, Entre Ríos, and Corrientes against the Brazilian Portuguese.

== Federal congress of the United Provinces ==
Fear of Brazilian aggression led the provinces to agree to a federal congress in 1824. Over a number of sessions, the congress drafted a "fundamental law" temporarily appointing the Governor of Buenos Aires Province as head of state until such an office could be formally established. Subsequent sessions saw reinvigorated support for the Banda Oriental's resistance against Brazil, culminating in the formal reintegration of the province into the now re-established United Provinces. Uruguay declared its independence at the Congress of Florida on 25 August 1825, leading Brazil to declare war on the United Provinces on 10 December 1825. This prompted the formal enactment of the presidency and the election of Bernardino Rivadavia as the United Provinces' first president, now tasked with coordinating the new Argentine army despite objections from the representatives of Buenos Aires, Entre Ríos, and Santa Fe over port rights. Rivadavia and his followers pushed hard for reforms intended to set up the basis of a federal-level government and successfully passed the Argentine Constitution of 1826, although it was denounced by some congress representatives as centralist in nature.

Although the United Provinces were initially successful in the war with Brazil it eventually stagnated, and poorly-led negotiations in 1827 discredited the central government. Facing opposition on all fronts Rivadavia resigned, with Vice President Vicente López y Planes soon following his example. Elections were held in Buenos Aires, where the opposition leader Manuel Dorrego was elected Governor of Buenos Aires since he was the only candidate. His peace negotiations with Brazil faced heavy pressure from the British Empire, which saw continued war as a threat to its trade networks. Mediated by Britain, the August 1828 Preliminary Peace Convention affirmed the independence of the Banda Oriental, a result not expected by the local population. The ensuing outrage prompted returning officer Juan Lavalle to stage a coup in December 1828 on behalf of those wanting a united Argentina, during which he executed Dorrego and dissolved the second republic of the United Provinces. But federalist rancher Juan Manuel de Rosas rose in revolt and defeated the coup.

== Liga del Interior and Pacto Federal ==
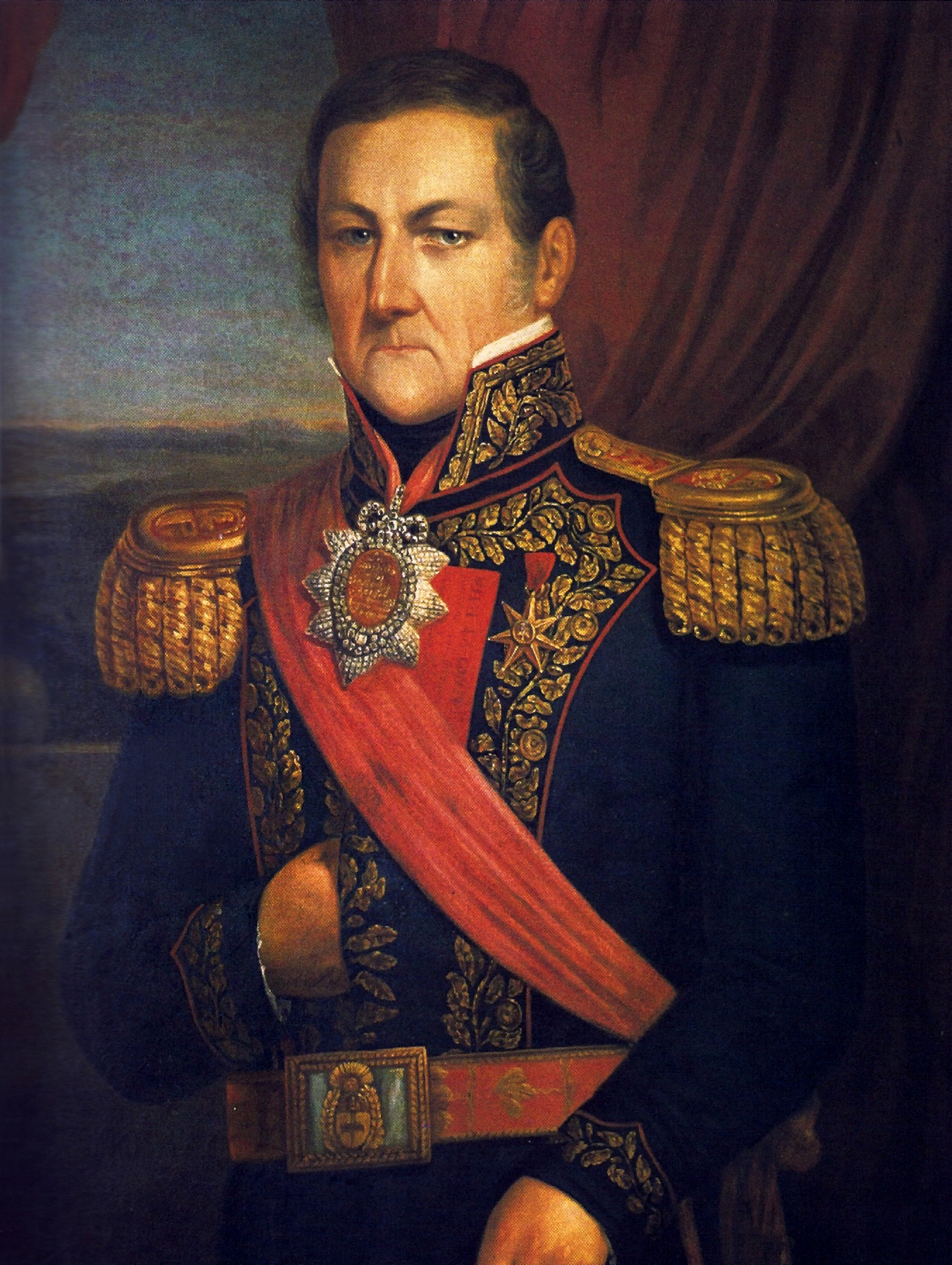
Buenos Aires Governor Juan Manuel de Rosas secured the Confederation under Federalist rule.

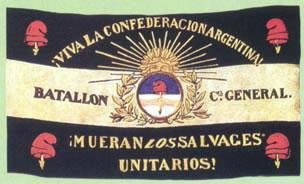
A Rosas-era banner calling for "death to the brutal Unitarians" typified the ongoing conflict.

Two cliques that were later named by contemporaries as the "Federalists" and the "Unitarians" began to take shape in 1829. In that year, Juan Manuel de Rosas assumed the governorship of Buenos Aires after forcing Lavalle's surrender, and in Cordoba the pro-Lavalle minister José María Paz began a campaign of subjugation of the interior provinces. In his writings he denounced provincial governors, especially those of the Littoral, calling them caudillos. He accused the anti-centralizing interior provinces of a colonial mindset, holding them responsible for the country's disorganized state and hence the stagnation of the independence war efforts and the collapse of the Army of the North. His campaign against settlements in western Argentina found little opposition except from Mendoza's caudillo, Juan Facundo Quiroga, whom he defeated in a series of skirmishes. Paz then set his sights on removing caudillo influence from the cities, ordering a series of purges and expropriations of deposed governors, including members of the Quiroga family.

On 5 July 1830 the Unitarian Liga del Interior was formally established as a military alliance, albeit with all local governors supplanted by Paz's followers. In response, on 4 January 1831, the provinces of Buenos Aires, Santa Fe, Corrientes, and Entre Ríos established the Federal Pact, a reference to Artigas' original proposal for a federal system to replace the Viceroyalty system. Hostilities between the two alliances began in May that year, ending with the defeat of the Unitarian League at the Battle of La Ciudadela. Juan Lavalle continued the conflict through a series of rebellions and alliances against Rosas and the Federal Pact, eventually being defeated and assassinated in 1841.

The victorious Federal Pact faction did not attempt to create a centralized government, and indeed provinces like Corrientes deemed the Pact dissolved by 1834 as they had achieved their objectives. Representation in foreign affairs was taken on by the much larger Buenos Aires province, with provincial governors officially delegating authority to Rosas' government. In addition, Rosas was symbolically granted the "sum of public power", suspending the separation of powers. These powers also enabled Rosas to participate, unsuccessfully, in the protracted Uruguayan Civil War in favour of Blanco's leader, Manuel Oribe. Oribe, in turn, led numerous military campaigns on behalf of Rosas and became an invaluable ally in the struggle against Lavalle and other Unitarians. Beginning with Rosas' 1835 governorship mandate, this arrangement began to be called the "Argentine Confederation", although it was created amid ongoing conflicts, interventionism, and rising local and international tensions.

When the Peru–Bolivian Confederation declared the War of the Confederation against Chile and Argentina, the governor of Entre Ríos, Justo José de Urquiza, led the other provinces in demanding the drafting of a constitution and the sharing of customs authority and export income. The Platine War of 1852 saw a Brazilian-led alliance of Colorado Uruguayan, dissident Federalist, and Paraguayan elements defeat the Argentine-Uruguayan army at the Battle of Caseros, leading to Rosas being deposed and exiled.

== Secession of Buenos Aires ==
The central figure in the overthrow of Rosas, Entre Ríos Governor Justo José de Urquiza, failed to secure Buenos Aires' ratification of the 1852 San Nicolás Agreement for a new constitution. Following this, Buenos Aires Unitarians launched the Revolution of 11 September 1852 and the State of Buenos Aires was declared, with this secessionist state rejecting the 1853 Constitution of Argentina and promulgating its own the following year. The most contentious issue remained the Buenos Aires Customs, which remained under the control of the city government and was the chief source of public revenue. Moreover, nations with which the Confederation maintained foreign relations kept their embassies in Buenos Aires rather than in the capital Paraná.

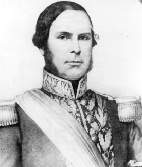
Justo José de Urquiza's 1852 overthrow of Rosas fanned Buenos Aires secessionists.

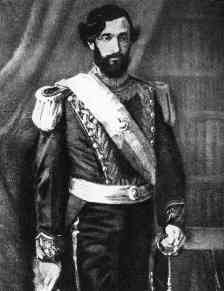
Bartolomé Mitre wrested concessions toward Buenos Aires and became a staunch defender of national unity.

The State of Buenos Aires was also bolstered by its numerous alliances in the hinterland, including that with Santiago del Estero Province (led by Manuel Taboada), as well as with powerful Unitarian Party governors in Salta, Corrientes, Tucumán, and San Juan. The 1858 assassination of San Juan's Federalist governor, Nazario Benavídez, by Unitarians inflamed tensions between the Confederation and the State of Buenos Aires. Tensions rose further when a free trade agreement between the chief Confederate Port of Rosario and the Port of Montevideo undermined Buenos Aires' trade. The election of the intransigent Valentín Alsina further exacerbated disputes, which culminated in the Battle of Cepeda (1859), where Buenos Aires forces led by General Bartolomé Mitre were defeated by those led by the President of Argentina, Justo José de Urquiza.

Ordered to subjugate Buenos Aires separatists by force, Urquiza instead invited the defeated to a round of negotiations and secured the Pact of San José de Flores, which provided for several constitutional amendments and led to other concessions. These included an extension of the province's customs house concession as well as measures benefiting the Bank of the Province of Buenos Aires, whose currency was authorized for use as legal tender at the customs house, thereby enabling the bank to control much of the nation's foreign trade.

Mitre ultimately abrogated the Pact of San José de Flores, a decision that led to the renewal of civil war. These hostilities culminated in the 1861 Battle of Pavón, where Mitre and Buenos Aires' victory over Urquiza's national forces resulted in Mitre's forces capturing more than half of the interior provinces and replacing their Federalist governments with Unitarians. President Santiago Derqui, who had been backed by Urquiza, resigned on 4 November 1861. Despite his victory over the Federalists, Mitre reaffirmed his commitment to the 1860 constitutional amendments and was elected the republic's first president in 1862.

== National unification ==
President Mitre instituted a limited suffrage electoral system known as the voto cantado ("intoned vote"), which depended on a pliant electoral college that, if necessary, would prevent the election of secessionists to high office through electoral fraud. Nicolás Avellaneda, the National Autonomist Party's Catamarca Province-born who had been endorsed by erstwhile Buenos Aires separatist Adolfo Alsina, won the 1874 election, leading to renewed fighting when Mitre mutinied on a gunboat to prevent the inaugural. But he was defeated, and only President Avellaneda's commutation of his death sentence spared his life.

Vestigial opposition to the new order continued from Federalists, notably La Rioja leader Chacho Peñaloza, who was killed in 1863 following a long campaign of internecine warfare, and Entre Ríos leader Ricardo López Jordán. His "Jordanist" rebellion of 1870 to 1876 which started with the assassination of former Federalist president Justo José de Urquiza, whom Jordan blamed for the Federalist defeat, marked the last Federalist revolt. The 1880 election of the National Autonomist leader of the Conquest of the Desert, General Julio Roca, led to a final armed insurrection by Buenos Aires Governor Carlos Tejedor, a die-hard opponent of the federalization of Buenos Aires and its resulting loss of privileges. The insurrection's quick defeat and the subsequent truce brokered by Mitre quietened the last source of open resistance to national unity embodied by the Buenos Aires Autonomists. This resulted in the federalization of Buenos Aires, as well as the hegemony over national politics until 1916 of Roca's PAN and pro-modernization Generation of '80 policy makers.

== Main conflicts ==
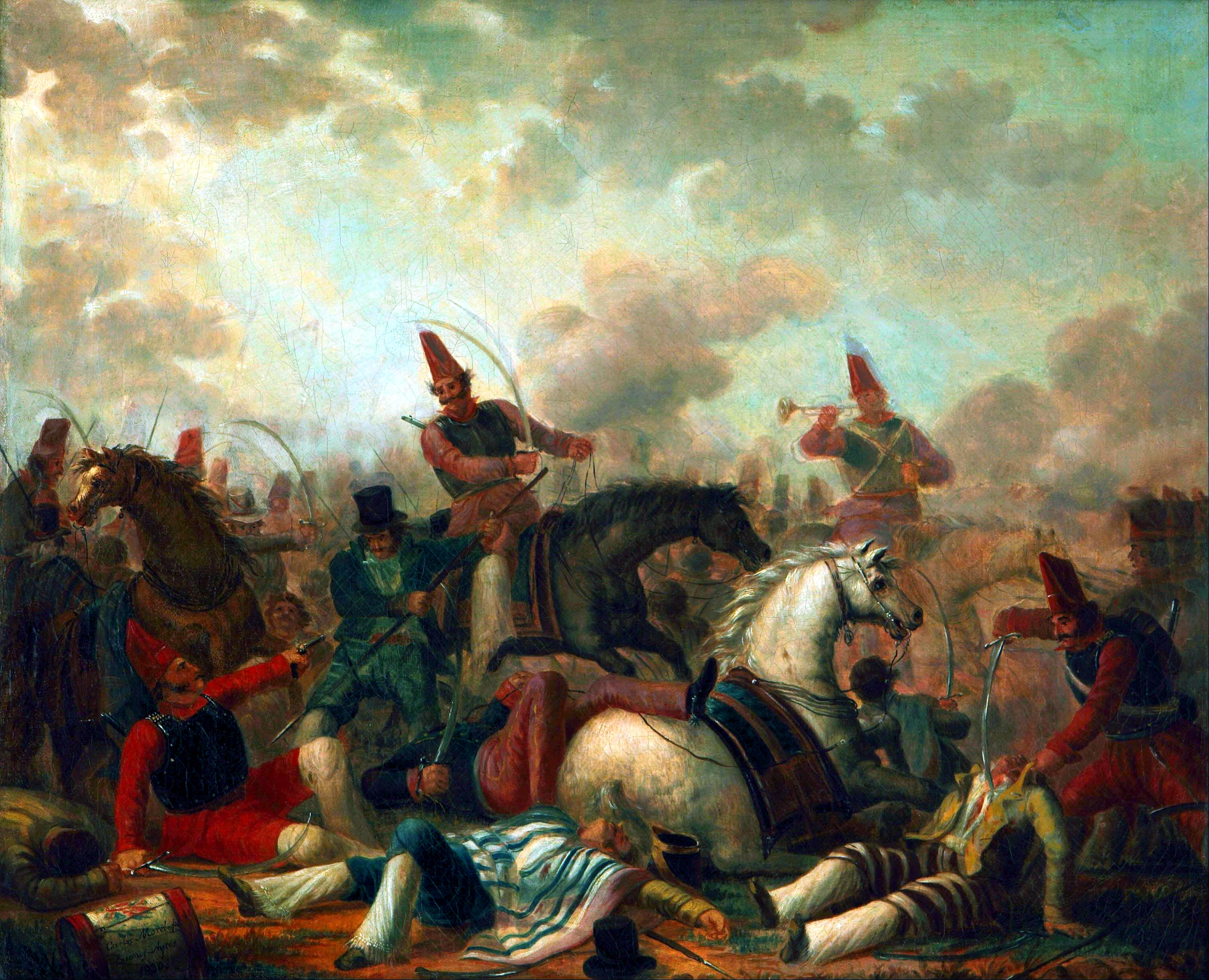
Cavalry fight in the age of Rosas, c. 1840.

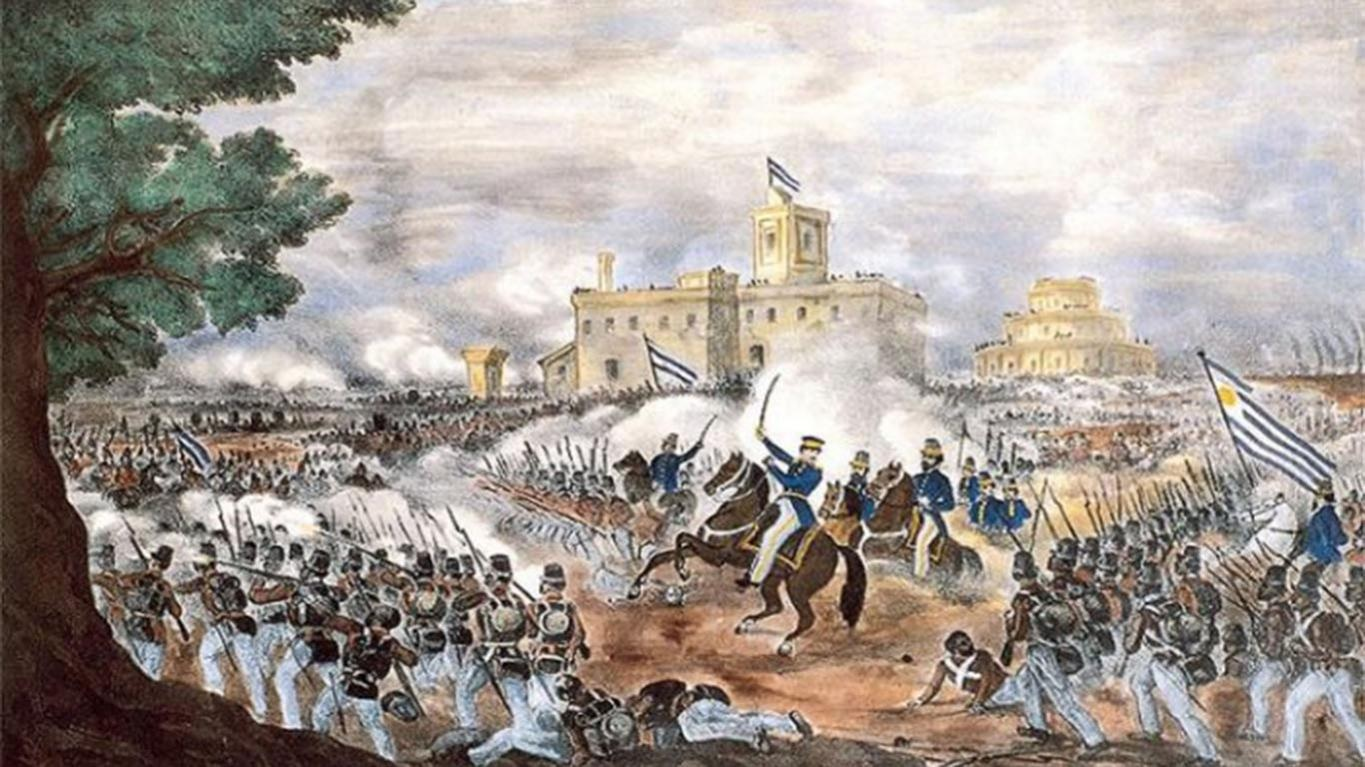
Battle of Caseros, 1852.

- War between the Supreme Director of the United Provinces of the Río de la Plata and José Artigas' League of the Free Peoples (1814–1820)
- Battle of Cepeda (1820)
- Conflicts with La Rioja leader Facundo Quiroga (1826–1835)
- Decembrist revolution (1828–1831)
- Federalist war against the Unitarian League (1831)
- Revolution of the Restorers against Buenos Aires Governor Juan Ramón Balcarce (1833)
- Conflicts with La Rioja leader Chacho Peñaloza (1835–1845; 1860–1863)
- French blockade of the Río de la Plata (1838)
- Free Men of the South revolt, quelled at Chascomús in 1839
- Pedro Ferré's Corrientes revolt (1839–1842)
- Involvement in the Uruguayan Civil War by Rosas on behalf of Manuel Oribe (1839–1851)
- War with the Northern Coalition (1840–1841)
- Juan Lavalle's revolt against Rosas (1841)
- Battle of Caaguazú and defeat of Unitarian forces in Corrientes (1841)
- Joaquín Madariaga's Corrientes revolt (1843–1847)
- Battle of Vuelta de Obligado (1845) and Anglo-French blockade of the Río de la Plata (1845–1850)
- Entre Ríos leader Justo José de Urquiza's break with Rosas (1851)
- Battle of Caseros (1852)
- Revolution of 11 September 1852, creating the State of Buenos Aires
- Siege of Buenos Aires (1852–1853)
- Battle of Cepeda (1859)
- Battle of Pavón (1861)
- Felipe Varela's Revolución de los Colorados in Catamarca and other western provinces (1867)
- Entre Ríos leader Jordán's rebellion (1870–1876)
- Mitre's insurrection against the Autonomist Party and President-elect Nicolás Avellaneda (1874)
- Buenos Aires Governor Carlos Tejedor's rebellion against President-elect Roca (1880)

== See also ==
- Rise of the Republic of Argentina
