= Battle of Cepeda (1820) =

Argentine Civil War battle

Coordinates: 33°22′53″S 60°34′59″W

- Part of the Argentine Civil War
Date	February 1, 1820
Location	Cepeda, Buenos Aires Province.
Result	Federalist victory: Fall of the Supreme Directorship; Derogation of the Constitution of 1819; Anarchy of the year XX

Belligerents
Federals	Unitarians

Commanders and leaders
Estanislao López; Francisco Ramírez; José Miguel Carrera	José Rondeau

Strength
1,000–1,700 (estimate)	2,000–3,000 (estimate)

Casualties and losses
40 dead and wounded	300 dead 30 prisoners 9 carriages with equipment captured

The Battle of Cepeda of 1820 took place on February 1 in Cañada de Cepeda, Buenos Aires Province, Argentina. The conflict was the first major battle that saw Unitarians and Federals as two constituted sides. It ended with the defeat of the national government.

Federal League Provinces of Santa Fe, Entre Ríos and José Miguel Carrera joined forces to topple the 1819 centralist Constitution and the Directorial government of the United Provinces of the Río de la Plata. Both provincial leaders, Estanislao López and Francisco Ramírez, were allies of José Gervasio Artigas.

Supreme Director José Rondeau called back the Armies that were fighting the Argentine War of Independence to fight the Federals. The Army of the Andes, commanded by José de San Martín refused to abandon the offensive against the royalists in Chile and Peru. The Army of the North, commanded by Manuel Belgrano, mutinied at Arequito, as the troops and the officiality refused to fight a civil war, and asked instead to go back to the northern frontier to fight the royalists. Rondeau's forces were defeated in the battle.

== Consequences ==
The complete victory of the Federal forces over a diminished Directorial army led to the end of the central authority established by the 1819 Constitution through the Supreme Director, and laid the foundations for a rather new Federal organization for Argentina, as the provinces of Santa Fe, Entre Ríos and Buenos Aires signed the Treaty of Pilar on February 23.

Some provisions included in the Treaty on behalf of Buenos Aires, proved unacceptable to Artigas (styled "Protector of the League of the Free Peoples", who was exiled in Entre Ríos following his defeat to the Brazilian Empire invasion of the Banda Oriental), so he ordered both López and Ramírez to renounce it. But, in one of the most important turns of Argentine history, however, both caudillos turned themselves against their former inspirational leader and Ramírez battled against him, destroying the remnants of his army and pushing him forward to exile in Paraguay.

Then, Ramírez took on seriously his own chances as hegemonic leader, so he declared the Republic of Entre Ríos on September 29, 1820, but the experiment would barely live as long as Ramírez himself. On July 10, 1821, he was assassinated by the forces of his former ally Estanislao López, who fought this time alongside Buenos Aires and Corrientes Provinces, fearful of Ramírez' aspirations.

The battle in 1820 initiated the so-called caudillo era. The battle would later be followed by a second Battle of Cepeda (1859), which involved clashes between the Unitarian and the Federalist forces, ending with the annexation of Buenos Aires into the union.

== See also ==
- History of Argentina
- United Provinces of the Río de la Plata
- Supreme Director of the United Provinces of the Río de la Plata
- Liga Federal
