= Arequito revolt =

Military revolt by the Army of the North

The Arequito revolt (Spanish: Motín de Arequito) (Arequito, Santa Fe Province, Argentina, January 8, 1820), was a military revolt by officers of the Army of the North through which they recused themselves from the fight in the civil war against the federales. Their intention was to return to the front of the war against the royalists in Upper Peru, an objective that they could not ultimately meet. It signified the beginning of the disintegration of the Supreme Directorship and was one of the main causes of the centralist defeat at the Battle of Cepeda.

== Federalism in Río de la Plata ==
The successive Argentine governments since the May Revolution tried to govern all the provinces of the Viceroyalty of the Río de la Plata by citing the argument that when the king's governance ceased, its rights reverted to the people. After the dissolution of the Junta Grande, the city of Buenos Aires clearly desired to dominate the country, with as little input from the other cities as possible.

The cities from the interior of the country, in the name of their respective territories, insistently requested to have equal participation in the national government and to elect their own local governments. For years, the different governments from Buenos Aires made an effort in the opposite way. All governors were appointed directly by the central government, and the city of Buenos Aires had a representation that was always greater than the rest in the assemblies that followed.

On the other hand, several of the central governments fell by coups d'état organized in Buenos Aires exclusively, and the national governments that followed them were invariably named by the cabildo of Buenos Aires.

The reaction of the interior provinces was surprisingly slow but inevitable. The first effective response to the porteño control came from the Banda Oriental (now Uruguay), where the caudillo José Artigas denied the capital the right to govern his province. In 1815, after more than a year of civil war, he gained complete control of the Provincia Oriental.

His example was followed by the bordering provinces, starting with Entre Ríos, where several caudillos deposed the governors placed by the Directory; with Francisco Ramírez as the leader in the province. A little later, Corrientes Province followed and ended its obedience to the central government.

The dissent followed to Santa Fe Province, which revolted against porteño dominance in 1815 and again in 1816 under the command of Mariano Vera, later succeeded by Estanislao López. The central government vehemently denied them the right of separation, as its territory was the obligatory route of communication with the interior of the country. No less than five military expeditions were launched from Buenos Aires to crush Santa Fe's resistance, but none of them succeeded.

The Northern provinces followed suit, Salta established an autonomous government under General Güemes, the Province of Cuyo refused the replacement of their governor, José de San Martín, and Córdoba elected its own governor, José Javier Díaz, a follower of Artigas.

== Army of the North and civil war ==
The Army of the North was formed to fight the War of Independence against the Spanish Empire in Upper Peru, but after the third defeat at the Sipe Sipe, it was left weakened and with a single base at Tucumán. In theory, its mission was to wait until the conditions permitted to restart the reconquest of the provinces in Upper Peru.

The Directorio decided to use the army to suppress internal rebellions in 1816. A fraction of the army was used to reinstate the governor of La Rioja Province and, at the beginning of the following year, the governor of Santiago del Estero Province. A little later, another part of the army helped deposed the governor of Córdoba Province and support his successor.

In 1818, the director Pueyrredón decided to suppress Santa Fe Province with a double attack. While an army attacked from the south, a division of the Army of the North would advance from the west. The quick reaction of Estanislao López dislodged the offensive. López captured the commander of the west column from Córdoba, Juan Bautista Bustos and then succeeded in repelling the attack from the south. Another similar attempt was thwarted in 1819.

The bulk of the Army of the North was established in Córdoba to the annoyance of many of their members, as it was far from the royalist enemies. In April, a peace treaty signed between the governments of Buenos Aires and Santa Fe gave hopes of a solution to the internal quarrels, and the offices believed they would go back to the northern front.

The treaty pacified its signatories, but Artigas, who considered himself as López's superior, and the Directorio were displeased. Artigas wanted the national government to unite against the Portuguese, who had invaded his province from Brazil. The new Supreme Director, José Rondeau, wanted to defeat Santa Fe with the help from the Portuguese. He called in the Army of the Andes, but its commander, San Martín, refused to obey. He also ordered the commander of the Army of the North, Manuel Belgrano, who initiated a march towards the south.

By the order of Artigas, Ramírez crossed the Paraná River and invaded the north of Buenos Aires Province, later retreating. Rondeau organised his army in the capital and marched to meet the threat. The Army of the North entered Santa Fe Province.

== Revolt ==
Arriving at Arequito, on January 8, 1820, General Bustos, supported by Colonels Alejandro Heredia and José María Paz, directed the military rebellion. The arrested Colonels Cornelio Zelaya and Manuel Guillermo Pinto in the middle of the night, traveled to a short distance from Fernández de la Cruz encampment, and decided to negotiate with him. They told him that they refused to continue with the civil war and to go back to the northern front against the royalists instead. They explicitly declared themselves neutral in the conflict between the Federalists and the Directory to avoid being accused of having supported the enemy. Bustos then had about 1,600 men, and Fernández de la Cruz, slightly fewer than 1,400.

Bustos demanded to receive half of their armament, munitions, and head of cattle, which Cruz seemed to accept at the beginning. However, at noon, he started a march towards the south although the promised goods had not been delivered.

Bustos ordered Heredia to pursue his former commander, which occurred when he was already surrounded by López's federalist troops (they were already in Santa Fe Province, a federalist stronghold). Seeing that he could not continue forward, Fernández de la Cruz decided to give his army to Bustos and returned to Buenos Aires almost alone and followed by only a few loyal officers like Lamadrid.

The next day, Bustos started his return to Córdoba, and on January 12, he reached Esquina, at Córdoba's border. He wrote to López and Rondeau from there to explain what had occurred and his plans to return to the fight in the north. In one of those letters he clarified:

"The weapons of the motherland, distracted from their main objective, as they were not used but to spill the blood of their citizens, the same ones from which sweat and labor insured their subsistence."

== After Arequito ==
After meeting with López's envoys at La Herradura, by the Tercero River, Bustos moved his army to Córdoba Province, where he was triumphantly received. Governor Manuel Antonio Castro had recently resigned and a new interim governor, José Javier Díaz, the chief of the local Federalists was elected. An assembly declared:

"as a free and sovereign province (Córdoba) does not know dependency nor owes subordination to another; and sees as one of its principal obligations the fraternity and union with all and the most close friendship with the provinces, while all united in a General Congress abide by the treaties for a true federation in peace and in war, which aspires to the conformity of all the others. Which will respond with all its efforts and what depended on its resources to fight the enemies of common freedom, even when the federation had not yet been organized in the provinces...."

That means the same sentiments that Bustos and the other participants of the Arequito rebellion had.

Rondeau confronted Ramírez and López with its own forces at the Battle of Cepeda and was thoroughly defeated. Only a week later, he resigned and dissolved the Congress of Tucumán. There was not to be a new Supreme Director because of pressure from López and Ramírez, Buenos Aires designated a provincial governor who signed the Treaty of Pilar with the Federalists.

While in Córdoba, Bustos learned of the end of the Directorship, and he started a campaign to reorganize the country, delaying the return of the Northern Army to the northern border. At the same time, interim Governor Díaz announced that he was thinking of an association with the Littoral Caudillos (Santa Fé, Entre Ríos and Corrientes Provinces) in their fight against Buenos Aires; that is, the signing of some alliance pact with José Gervasio Artigas, Ramírez or López.

That was not Bustos's objective and so he actively opposed Díaz's policies. Looking for allies, he reached the Federalists of Juan Pablo Bulnes, who were distanced from Díaz's group, and various local politicians and influential local businessmen. With their support, he was elected governor on March 19.

Bustos then dedicated himself to govern and organize the province, and he mediated between López and the Buenos Aires Province government, who were still fighting each other. He sent Colonel Heredia with a portion of the army to the provinces of the north, as an advance party of the promised march to resume war with the royalists. Unfortunately, Heredia did not get to fight the Spaniards, as his force was used by Martín Miguel de Güemes in the rebellion against the governor of Tucumán.

The remaining forces were used for the defense of the province against the Pampas and Chaco native tribes and the following year to repel the combined attack of Francisco Ramírez and José Miguel Carrera.

== Historical review ==
The Arequito Revolt was reported by early historians in a bad light. The chronicles by Lamadrid and Paz called it treason to the motherland or an obscure event organized to place Bustos in the Córdoba government house and nothing more. Historians in the second half of the 19th century, starting with Bartolomé Mitre and Vicente Fidel López accused him of both. Nobody dared to defend Bustos and his followers, and as the defeat of the federalist party in the civil wars carried forward their enemies, that point of view was the one which survived.

Many years later, the school of Argentina historical revisionism started to see the Arequito Revolt with different eyes. Also, Córdoba historians valued their first autonomous governors, who had supported or participated in the events. In the mid-20th century, with the historical revisionism firmly established and the apogee of the historical overvaluation of San Martín, who also had refused to participate in the civil war, the Arequito Revolt was seen as an important step in the formation of modern Argentina.

In effect, the rebellion of the Army of the North permitted the provinces to impose their will for the first time over the central government in Buenos Aires, made the odd and almost monarchist Unitarian Party constitution of 1819 disappear, permitted the birth of the autonomous government in Buenos Aires Province, equalized the rights of the people, and opened the way for an equal treatment and relations between the provinces (a path that would prove to be difficult, as it would take 50 years of more civil wars in Argentina).

Possibly, if the Army of the North would have followed its path to the north, the war between Buenos Aires and the federalists from the Litoral provinces would have lasted much longer, and the inevitable formation of a modern federalist Argentine nation would have been more difficult.

== Bibliography ==
- Serrano, Mario (1996). Arequito: ¿por qué se sublevó el Ejército del Norte? (in Spanish). Buenos Aires: Ed. Círculo Militar.
- López Rosas, José R. (1981). Entre la monarquía y la república (in Spanish). Buenos Aires: Ed. La Bastilla.
- Bischoff, Efraín (1989). Historia de Córdoba (in Spanish). Buenos Aires: Ed. Plus Ultra.
- Núñez, M. (1975). "Bustos, el caudillo olvidado". Cuadernos de revista Crisis (in Spanish). Buenos Aires.
- Paz, José María (2000). Memorias póstumas (in Spanish). Buenos Aires: Ed. Emecé.
- Aráoz de Lamadrid, Gregorio (1895). Memorias (in Spanish). Buenos Aires.
- López, Vicente Fidel (1954). Historia de la República Argentina (in Spanish). Buenos Aires: Sopena.
- Mitre, Bartolomé (1947). Historia de Belgrano y de la independencia argentina (in Spanish). Buenos Aires: Ed. Estrada.
- Busaniche, José Luis (1969). Historia argentina (in Spanish). Buenos Aires: Ed. Solar.
