= Artigas flag =

Artigas Flag
- Flag of Artigas (Bandera de Artigas)
- Proportion: 2:3
- Adopted: January 13, 1815; 211 years ago (as flag of Federal League); September 1820; 206 years ago (as flag of Republic of Entre Ríos); February 18, 1952; 74 years ago (as flag of Uruguay); March 13, 1987; 39 years ago (as flag of Entre Ríos)
- Designed by: José Gervasio Artigas and José María de Roo
- Use: Early version
- Adopted: c. 1814

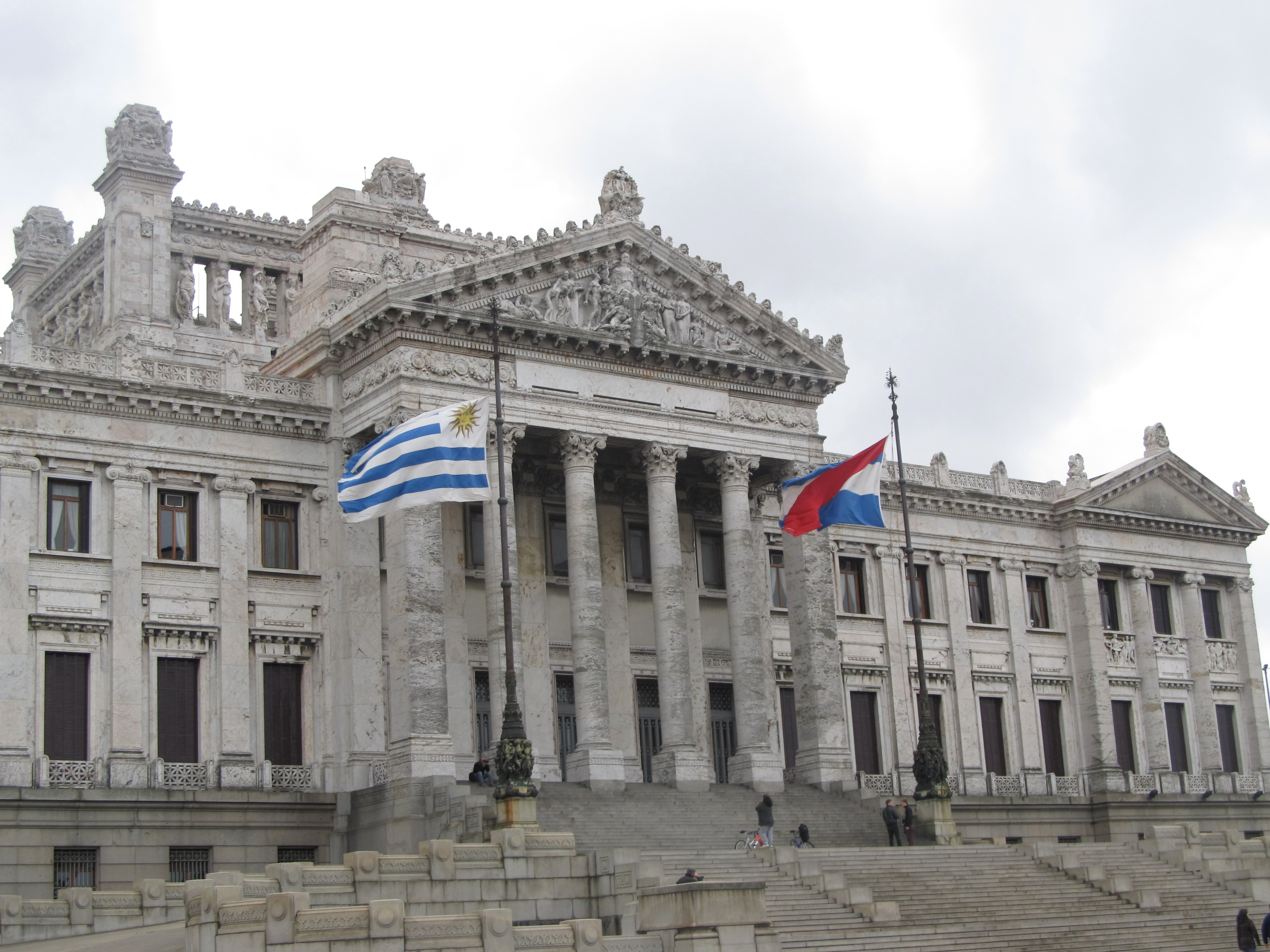
The Artigas flag flying alongside the Uruguayan Flag in the Uruguayan Parliament.

The Artigas flag is a flag created in the early 19th century by the South American libertador and political leader José Gervasio Artigas. It was originally designed to be the national flag of the Federal League, a confederation of provinces that briefly existed between 1815 and 1820.

Since 1952, it has been one of the national flags of Uruguay and since 1987, the flag of the Argentine province of Entre Ríos. The flag consists of a white horizontal stripe between two blue and red bend. The blue and white stripes come from the flag created by Manuel Belgrano, while the red was added as a symbol of the fight for federalism.

== History ==
=== Origin ===
In 1810, as a result of the May Revolution, the Viceroyalty of Rio de la Plata declared independence, becoming the United Provinces of South America, but for some time continued to use the Spanish flag. On 27 February 1812, Manuel Belgrano designed a flag for his soldiers with two blue stripes on the edges and a white stripe in the middle and proposed it as the flag of the United Provinces, however, due to the complicated situation, the Primera Junta officially fought on behalf of the Spanish King Ferdinand VII, who was in captivity to Napoleon.

In 1814 José Gervasio Artigas, the leader of the Provincia Oriental, began to organize the League of the Free Peoples. The first flag was created before the League was formed and was based on the Belgano flag. The flag consisted of horizontal blue-white-blue bands, with each blue band having a horizontal red band inside. The blue stripes were to symbolize the two banks of the Río de la Plata.

Later, Artigas changed the two red stripes to one diagonal one, to clearly distinguish his flags from similar flags of his opponents. The final design was not created directly by Artigas but by José María de Roo, a customs official from Montevideo and an expert in heraldry. De Roo likely served as a consultant to Artigas, though the exact nature of their collaboration and the extent of Artigas's influence on the design remain unclear.

=== Federal League ===
The new flag was first raised at Artigas's military camp in Arerunguá on 13 January 1815. In Montevideo it was flown for the first time on 26 March by order of the military governor of Montevideo, Colonel Fernando Otorgués, and in Entre Ríos on 13 March. Over time, the flag spread throughout the League. In 1820, after defeating the Unitarian forces, the governors of the provinces of Entre Ríos, Santa Fe, and Corrientes signed the Treaty of Pilar with Buenos Aires and reunited with the United Provinces, thus dissolving the Federal League. Faced with the Portuguese invasion and conflict with his former allies, Artigas was defeated and fled to Paraguay. Pursuing Artigas, the governor of Entre Ríos, Francisco Ramírez, captured the city of Corrientes on 19 September, declaring himself governor of the province of Corrientes and all of Mesopotamia.

=== After the fall of the League ===
Ramírez created a Republic of Entre Ríos from the territories he controlled in September 1820. Despite the title "Republic" and its practical independence, Ramírez had no intention of seceding from the United Provinces. Entre Ríos quickly came into conflict with Estanislao López, governor of Santa Fe. Since Ramírez used Artigas' old flag as his own, Santa Fe abandoned it and adopted a new one. The republic came to an end a year later when, during the campaign in Santa Fe, Ramírez was betrayed by one of his commanders, Lucio Norberto Mansilla, and then killed after being captured by López's troops.

After the restoration of the province of Entre Ríos by Governor Lucio Mansilla in 1821, on 12 March 1822, the provincial congress banned the use of the federal flag and any other flags used and instead introduced new symbols. Following Mansilla's resignation in 1824, during the government of Juan León Solas, the Ramírez flag informally returned to the province along with the national flag, although it was not formalized due to factional fighting in the following years.

Dark blue, white and red were widely used by the Federalist Party throughout its existence, but the Artigas flag itself was used less and less compared to the Rosas flag and the provincial flags.

=== Modern use ===
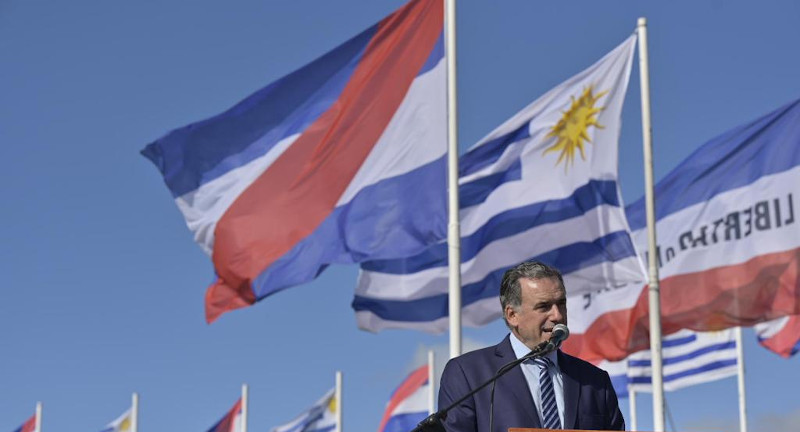
Uruguayan president Yamandú Orsi giving a speech with the Artigas Flag in the background.

The Artigas flag remained one of the patriotic symbols in Uruguay, but it lacked official status until the 18 February 1952 when a decree came into force which, among other things, officially recognized the Artigas flag and the flag of the Treinta y Tres as national symbols amongst the national flag, the coat of arms and the national anthem. The law states that all public buildings, offices and ships must fly the three official flags in national holidays.

On 5 March 1987, Governor Sergio Montiel instituted the Artigas flag as the flag of the Entre Ríos province in Argentina.

== Flags of the League's provinces ==
Provincia Oriental

Misiones

Córdoba

Córdoba

Corrientes

Corrientes

Santa Fe

The diagonal stripe pattern did not become common throughout the league right away. Especially in 1815, other arrangements of federal colors were used locally. Usually these flags took the form of simple tricolors. Apparently, the military governor of Montevideo, Fernando Otorgués, and the commander, Andrés Guacurarí, entering Misiones, used three horizontal stripes from the top of the colors red, blue and white. Otorgués flag quickly changed the order of the stripes to blue-white-red and became the Banda Oriental flag used throughout the period of the League's control over the eastern bank of the Uruguay River. The Banda Oriental flag was again used as the basis for the flag of the Treinta y Tres and as the first flag of the Republic of Uruguay in 1825.

José de Silva, who overthrew the pro-centralist government in Corrientes in December 1814, introduced the flag with horizontal stripes, which was used there until the end of the League's existence.

== Legacy ==
=== Argentina ===
==== Current ====
Flag of Santa Fe since 1986

Flag of Córdoba since 2010

Flag of La Rioja since 1986

Flag of Misiones since 1992

Flag of Entre Ríos Province since 1987

Flag of Santiago del Estero since 1985

Flag of city of Corrientes since 2014

==== Historical ====
Merchant ensign of the Cisplatine Province of the Empire of Brazil

Flag of the Argentine Confederation (1835–1850)

Flag of the Argentine Confederation (1850–1861)

Flag of Entre Ríos (1833-1853)

Flag of Santa Fe (De Jure 1821–1822)

Flag of Santa Fe (1822–1880)

Flag of the Republic of Tucumán (1820–1821)

=== Uruguay ===
==== Uruguayan Navy ====
From 1930s to 1990s, warships of the Uruguayan Navy flew the Artigas flag as the naval jack, until being replaced by modified pre-1930s design.

==== Uruguayan Air Force ====
Flag of the Uruguayan Air Force

Roundel of Uruguay

The aircraft of the Uruguayan Air Force display the Artigas flag on the fins, as well as a circular version of the flag (roundel) on the fuselages and wings.

==== Uruguayan army and general military use ====
Flag of Uruguayan Army

Military Cockade of Uruguay

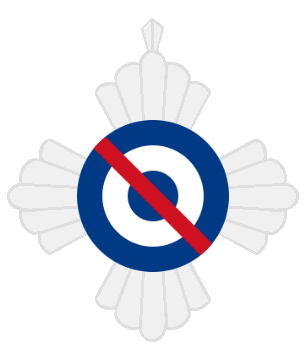
18 May 1811 Medal

There is also a different version of the roundel, known as the Artigas' cockade, which is worn as a cockade on the uniforms of the military of Uruguay, and also serves as the emblem of the Uruguayan Army. It is likewise based on the Artigas flag, but with blue at the centre, surrounded by white then blue, and with the red diagonal stripe overall.

==== Departments ====
Flag of Canelones Department since 2010

Flag of Paysandú Department since 1992

Flag of Soriano Department since 1994

Coat of Arms of Artigas Department since 1964

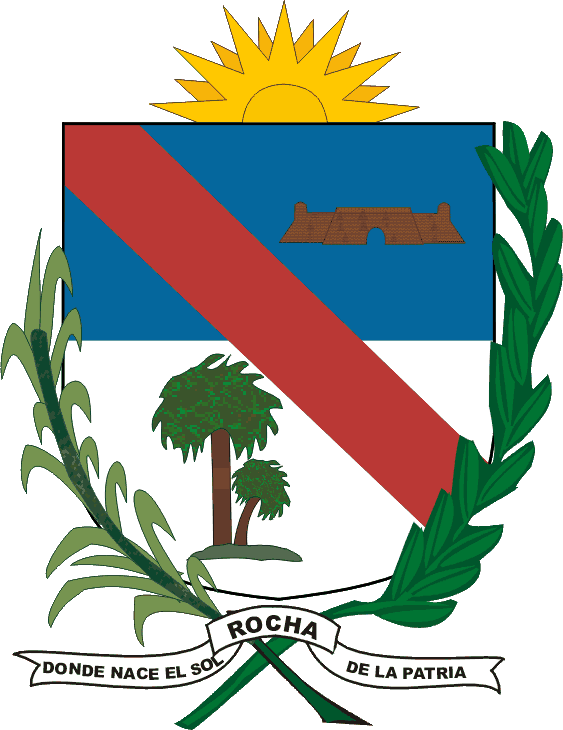
Coat of arms of Rocha Department

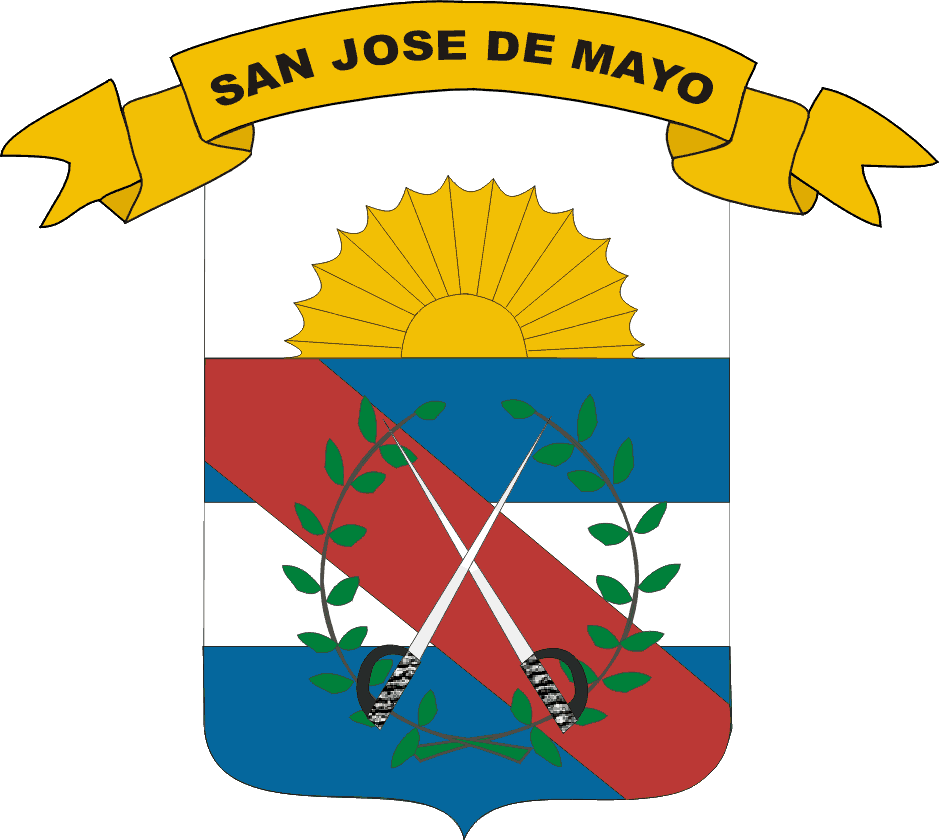
Coat of arms of San José Department since 1926

==== Sport ====
Club Nacional de Football

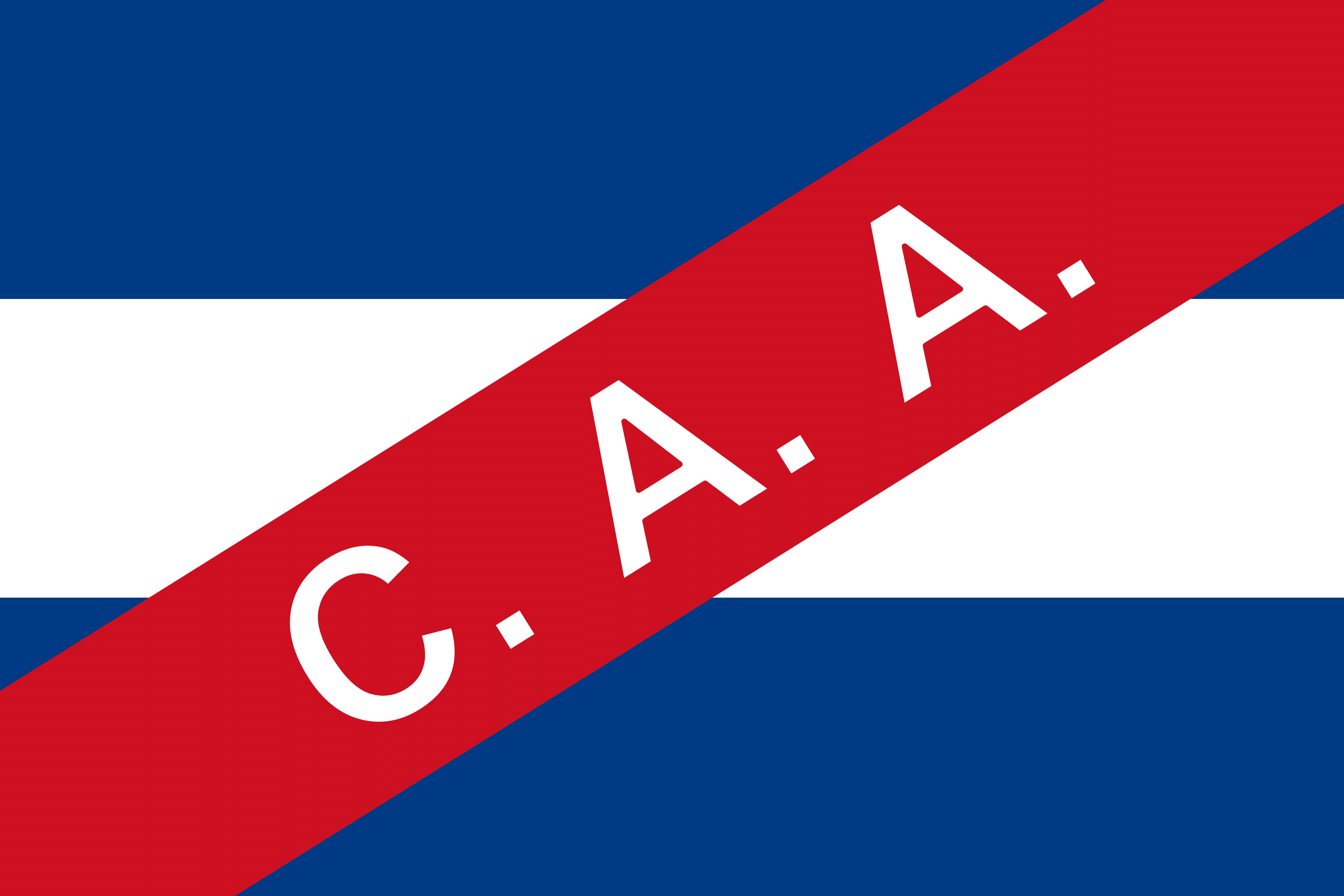
Club Atlético Artigas

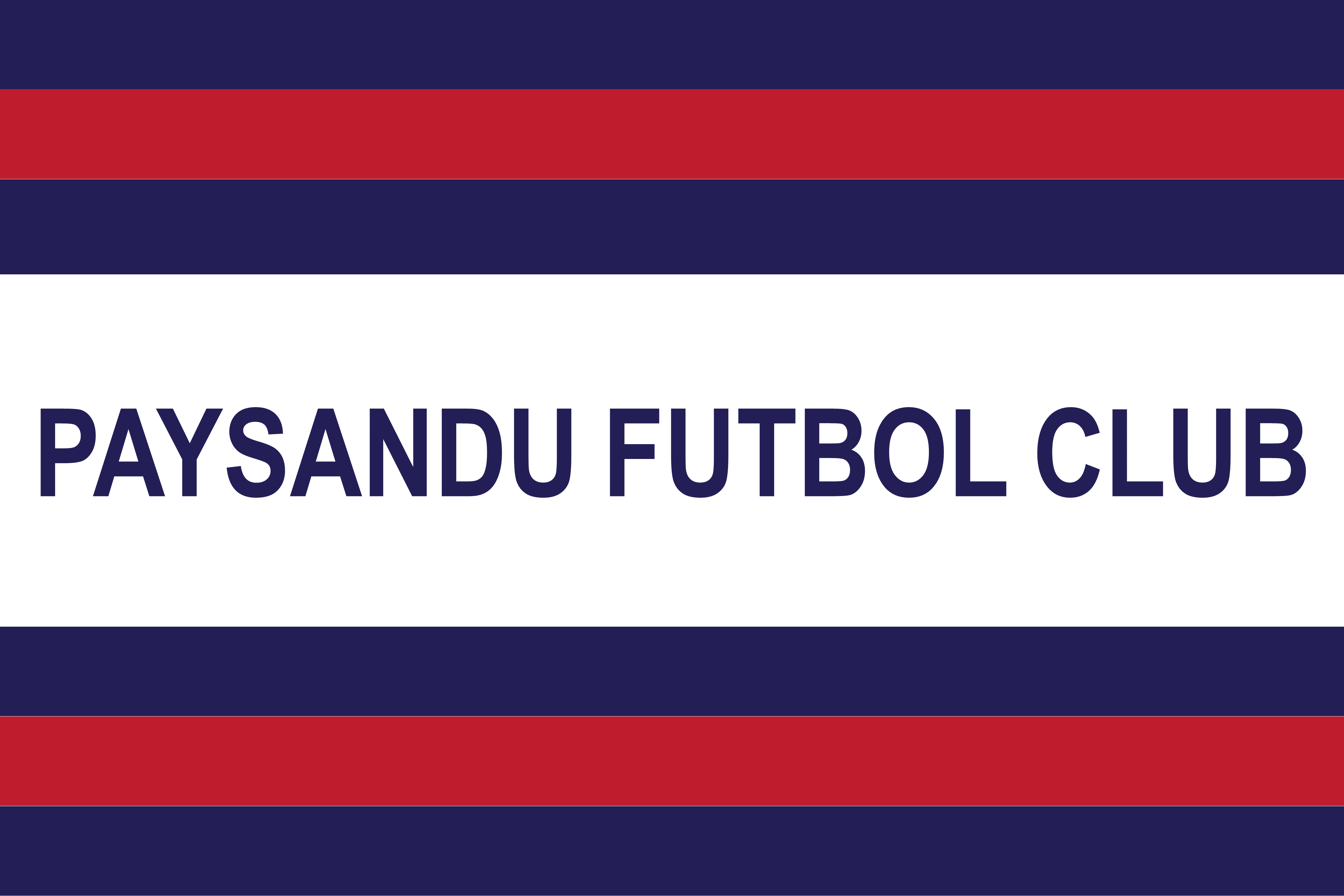
Paysandú Fútbol Club

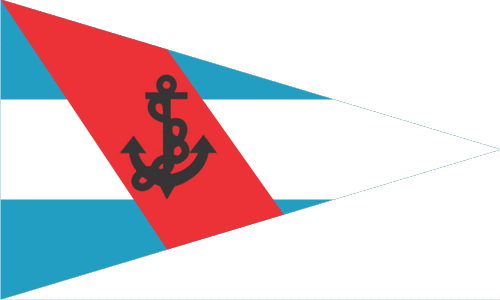
Burgee of Yacht Club Punta del Este

The symbols of the first division football Club Nacional de Football were inspired by the Artigas flag, as were those of the third division club Club Atlético Artigas and Paysandú Fútbol Club.

==== Political organizations ====
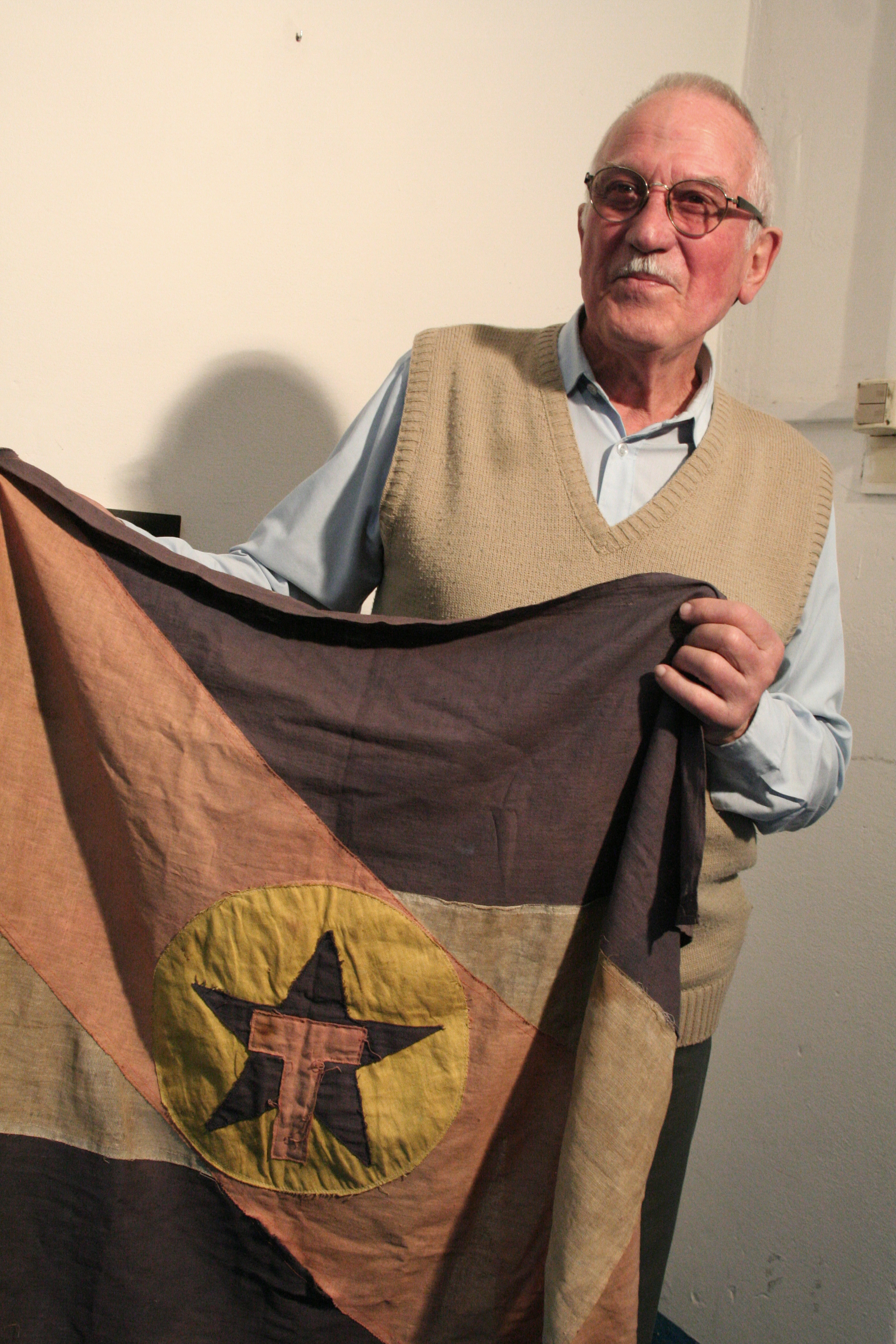
Former guerrilla Julio Marenales holding the Tupamaros flag.

National Liberation Movement – Tupamaros (1967-1972)

Anti-imperialist Unitary Commissions (since 2008)

The leftist urban guerrilla group Tupamaros, founded in the 1960s, uses an Artigas flag defaced with their emblem of a red or yellow star and the letter "T."

Currently, the first Artigas flag is used by the far-left party COMUNA, which added its logo on the white stripe, and by Cabildo Abierto, which is considered a right-wing party.

==== Flag of the Charrúa ====
Flag of the Charrúa

The flag with green stripes is used as one of the modern unofficial symbols of the indigenous Charrúa people. The flag colored green is attributed to the Charrúa cavalry that fought in the League's army. No sources mention that the Charrúa cavalry used a special flag intentionally different from the basic Artigas flag, but there is an account describing the green stripe flags used by Andrés Guacurarí in Misiones. Guacurarí was the adopted son of Artigas and came from the Guarani people. It is usually assumed that the flags seen at Misiones were faded. The Guarani language of that time did not distinguish between the colors blue and green.
