= Flag of Misiones Province =

Symbol of the Argentine subnational unit

Misiones Province

The flag of Misiones, a province of Argentina, was introduced by provincial decree no. 326 of 12 February 1992 and consists of three horizontal stripes from the top of the colors red, blue and white. The origins of the flag date back to the flag of the League of the Free Peoples created by José Artigas based on Manuel Belgrano's flag. According to Artigas, the meaning of the flag is as follows:

Red: "for the blood shed to maintain our freedom and independence."
Blue: "for our decision regarding the Republic."
White: "for our distinction and greatness."

Flag Day falls on November 30 in memory of Andrés Guacurarí, who was born on that day.

== History ==
Flag of League of the Free Peoples (1815–1820) and Republic of Entre Ríos (1820–1821)

Guacurarí flag with a light blue stripe.

Guacurarí flag with a green stripe.

Coat of arms of the Misiones Province, adopted in 1955 and abolished in 1959.

The flag was originally introduced by Andrés Guacurarí, after his arrival in Misiones in early March 1815. In Misiones, the main flag of the League of the Free Peoples with a red bend and a flag of three horizontal stripes for the province itself were used. Similar flags, with different arrangements of colors, were used by other provinces of the league. From the beginning, doubts have been raised as to whether the colors of the Misiones flag still correspond to the colors of the original artists: white, light blue and red, since some descriptions from the era mentioned the middle stripe as green, and sometimes it was even said that the upper stripe was black. It is currently believed that the source of these discrepancies is that the authors saw a flag that had faded, with the light blue changing to greenish and the red being dimmed. It is uncertain how long the three-striped flag was in use. After the fall of the League, southern Misiones was occupied by Francisco Ramírez, Governor of Entre Ríos. Despite being in conflict with Artigas, Ramírez continued to use the same flag. Over the following years, Misiones was occupied by Corrientes, Brazil, Paraguay before being permanently annexed to Corrientes on 1 September 1832.

When the province was restored in early 1954, a coat of arms featuring red, green, and white was adopted.

On 12 February 1992, he then governor Governor of Misiones Province, Ramón Puerta, signed Decree No. 326, restoring the red, blue, and white flag's official status.

== Similarity to other flags ==
In 1816, a tricolor with an identical arrangement was raised in Montevideo by the military governor Fernando Otorgués, appointed by José Artigas. Shortly thereafter, the Provincia Oriental, later the Republic of Uruguay, changed the order of the stripes. The Otorgués flag also forms the basis for the flag of the Broad Front.

The Serbian tricolor was created with the 1835 constitution as a merchant flag and over time became the national flag. The Republic of Serbia removed the Yugoslav-era red star and adopted a simple version of its tricolour following a referendum in 1992. The flags remained similar until 2004, when Serbia added a coat of arms with a white eagle. During the Yugoslav wars, similar flags were also adopted by the Serb-dominated Serbian Krajina and the Republika Srpska, which still exists as a federal entity of Bosnia and Herzegovina and still uses a simple tricolour in 1:2 proportions. The flag of Misiones also resembles the old flag of Montenegro. All flags from the Balkans have different proportions and shades than Misiones.

== See also ==
- Artigas flag
- List of Argentine flags
