= Quadrilateral Treaty =

1822 pact of Argentine provinces

The Quadrilateral Treaty was a pact between the Argentine provinces of Buenos Aires, Santa Fe, Entre Ríos and Corrientes, signed on 25 January 1822. The treaty was intended to be an offensive-defensive pact between the signatories, in front of an attack by Luso-Brazilian invasion from the Banda Oriental (present-day Uruguay), which was seen as very probable. It also wanted to establish peace after the defeat of the caudillo from Entre Ríos, Francisco Ramírez, who in 1821 had invaded Santa Fe and Córdoba Provinces, without success.

The pact established:

- Peace and union of the four provinces, and an alliance before a possible foreign invasion of Spaniards, Portuguese or Brazilians.
- Free navigation rights in the rivers of the signatory provinces.
- The retirement of the representatives from the small congress of Córdoba.
- Any of the signatory provinces could convene a congress un congreso when it felt the opportunity and need arose.

The alliance of Buenos Aires with the provinces of the Argentine littoral, insured through government subsidies, gave an opportunity to Buenos Aires of neutralizing the Governor of Córdoba Juan Bautista Bustos, who awaited the country's reorganization in a National Constitution since 1825.

== See also ==
- Treaty of Pilar
- Treaty of Benegas

== Bibliography ==
- Rins, Cristina E.; Winter, María Felisa (1996). La Argentina, una historia para pensar 1776-1996. Kapelusz. ISBN 950-13-2569-5.
