= Flag of Córdoba Province, Argentina =

Córdoba Province

The flag of Córdoba Province in Argentina is a triband consisting of red, white, and light blue bands charged with a gold Sun with 32 rays (16 straight and 16 wavy, arranged alternately) in the centre. The flag was selected in a competition in 2010, but the colour shades were changed in 2014. White and blue are the colours of the Argentine national flag. The symbolizes the province's autonomy and the early period of the province's history, when it belonged to the League of the Free Peoples. The sun refers to the Sol de Mayo and to the symbol of the Jesuits created by Ignatius Loyola in 1541.

== Colours scheme ==
Colours scheme	Red	White	Gold	Blue
RGB	151, 27, 47	255-255-255	140, 113, 76	108, 172, 228
Hexadecimal	#971B2F	#FFFFFF	#8C714C	#6CACE4
CMYK	0, 82, 69, 41	0, 0, 0, 0	0, 19, 46, 45	53, 25, 0, 11
Pantone	7427 C	White	873 C	284 C

== History ==
=== Flags from 1815 ===
Flag of Córdoba (1815)

Flag of Córdoba (1815)

Flag of League of the Free Peoples (1815–1820)

When Cordoba joined the League of the Free Peoples led by José Gervasio Artigas in 1815, a flag with three equal horizontal stripes was used. There are differences in the arrangement of colors, one version with the top white, the middle light blue or light blue and the bottom red, or another version with the top red, the middle white and the bottom light blue. The first flags, however, were quickly abandoned in favor of the League flag, which was used until the league's demise in 1820. Since Governor Juan Bautista Bustos, the province has used only the national flag.

=== Current flag ===
Flag proposed in 1986

Flag of Córdoba (2010-2014)

In 1986, MP Héctor Peña proposed the adoption of the first provincial flag since the founding of the League. In 1986, the only province to use its own flag was Santiago del Estero, while Santa Fe and La Rioja adopted their own flags at the same time. The proposed flag restored the federal colors in vertical stripes of white, blue, and red, with the Sun of May from the national flag on the blue stripe and the bastion tower on the red stripe. The tower is the charge of the province's coat of arms and dates back to when Jerónimo Luis de Cabrera founded the city of Córdoba in 1573. The flag was approved by the Legislature of Córdoba with the support of the Radicalits and Peronists, but was vetoed by then-governor Eduardo Angeloz who deemed it secessionist.

On 7 July 2010, Governor Juan Schiaretti filed bill 9806 in the legislature to hold a competition for the provincial flag. The competition was run by the provincial legislature of Córdoba and ended on 16 December. The winning design by Cristian Baquero Lazcano was submitted by the Institute of Ceremonies and Public Relations of Inarce. The new flag was presented for the first time at the monument to Juan Bautista Bustos in the Sarmiento Park in the city of Córdoba. On 31 August 2011, the Legislature of the province of Córdoba sanctions Law No. 9989, which establishes the day of the death of General Juan Bautista Bustos, 18 September, as "Flag Day of the Province of Córdoba". The colours of the flag were modified by Law No. 10193, adopted in 2014.

== See also ==
- List of Argentine flags
- Flag of Santa Fe Province
- Flag of Entre Ríos Province
