= Battle of San Roque =

Coordinates: 31°22′41″S 64°28′10″W

- Part of Decembrist revolution
Date	22 April 1829
Location	Córdoba Province, Argentina
Result	Unitarian victory

Belligerents
Federalists	Unitarians

Commanders and leaders
Juan Bautista Bustos	José María Paz

The Battle of San Roque was part of the Argentine Civil War. It was fought on the Primero River, near the city of Córdoba, Argentina, on 22 April 1829. The Federalist forces of Córdoba Province governor Juan Bautista Bustos were defeated by the Unitarian forces of General José María Paz. As a result of his victory, Paz assumed the office of provincial Governor.

== Prelude ==
General Bustos had governed Córdoba since the days of the Arequito Revolt, in 1820. His confrontation with Paz, who had fought with him in the revolt, had started a few months earlier: Paz thought Bustos had betrayed the rebel group, not carrying his army to the seat of the independence war in Upper Peru.

After a lacklustre career in Salta Province, Paz had made a name for himself in the war with Brazil, where he was promoted to the rank of general after the Battle of Ituzaingó. He then declared himself to be against the Buenos Aires governor Manuel Dorrego who had been forced to sign a peace treaty with the Empire of Brazil which granted the independence of Uruguay and its separation from the United Provinces of the Río de la Plata. Paz supported the revolution against Dorrego, organized and fought the forces of Juan Lavalle.

As Lavalle had not been able to vanquish the dissidents in his province, Paz gathered his troops in the interior of the country and marched north, with the excuse of returning his men to their provinces. Instead, he reached Córdoba's provincial capital city, where he demanded Bustos's resignation, whose mandate had expired, and wanted to elect a new governor (the provincial constitution had term limits and prohibited a third mandate), while everybody at the time knew that Paz had in mind to be a candidate himself.

Paz attacked Córdoba with his powerful army, but Bustos escaped to a ranch at San Roque, in the foothills near the city. Bustos tried to negotiate an agreement by which neither would be the new governor. Paz disagreed, and broke relations, accusing Bustos of delaying tactics while awaiting reinforcements. Bustos had sent a message to Juan Facundo Quiroga, the caudillo and militia commander in La Rioja Province, asking for help.

== Battle development ==
Before Bustos could receive reinforcements, Paz advanced towards San Roque. Bustos made a last effort, sending his son-in-law Arredondo to negotiate peace. Paz attacked without answering. It is possible, judging by the lack of movements or preparations on the part of Bustos, that Arredondo had not yet arrived with a response, so the federalist commander would have thought they were still within a period of truce. Paz's behavior the next year at the Battle of Oncativo supposes this was the case.

Bustos was not very experienced in battle, and the few he had won were from defensive positions. He therefore just waited for the unitarians, protecting his position with artillery. Paz simply divided his forces and commanded his lieutenants to just walk over anybody on their front. The order was followed in each of his groups, after a severe bombardment over the federalist positions by commander Arengreen's artillery, a Swedish soldier fighting for the unitarians. The divisions commanded by Román Deheza, Gregorio Aráoz de Lamadrid and Juan Esteban Pedernera displaced the enemy's forces before them with ease.

The federalist troops, on their side were severely affected by the unitarian bombardment, and after the capture of their artillery and heavy losses of their men, they simply ran away from the battlefield. The unitarian cavalry slaughtered the fleeing enemy causing more than 100 deaths in a few minutes. In a little more than a half-hour of combat, Bustos ordered a retreat of his remaining forces.

== Consequences ==
Bustos was forced to leave, running for refuge within Quiroga's troops, therefore abandoning his province. Only a month later, Bustos and Quiroga tried again for revenge: invaded the province of Córdoba, occupied most of the western hills and marched on the provincial capital. They confronted Paz at the Battle of La Tablada but ultimate victory was again on Paz's side.

Córdoba province remained under Paz's and unitarian control, joined with the federalists that had left Bustos plus the young class of city lawyers and merchants. He then set to make at least a tacit alliance with the unitarian governments of the provinces of Tucumán and Salta, and after the next battles he could formalize the Unitarian League (a.k.a. Liga del Interior)

San Roque was the first of four battles commanded by general Paz. He won all four decisively, distinguishing himself as the best Argentine general of the time.

The Battle of San Roque's field is today under the waters of San Roque Lake, near today's city of Villa Carlos Paz.

== See also ==
- Argentine Civil War
- Pacto Federal
- Unitarian Party
- Federales (Argentina)

== Bibliography ==
- Bischoff, Efraín (1989). Historia de Córdoba. Buenos Aires: Ed. Plus Ultra.
- Bischoff, Efraín (1975). Por qué Córdoba fue invadida en 1829. Buenos Aires: Ed. Plus Ultra.
- Paz, José María (2000). Memorias Póstumas. Buenos Aires: Ed. Emecé.
