= Irineo Leguisamo =

Uruguayan jockey (born 1985)

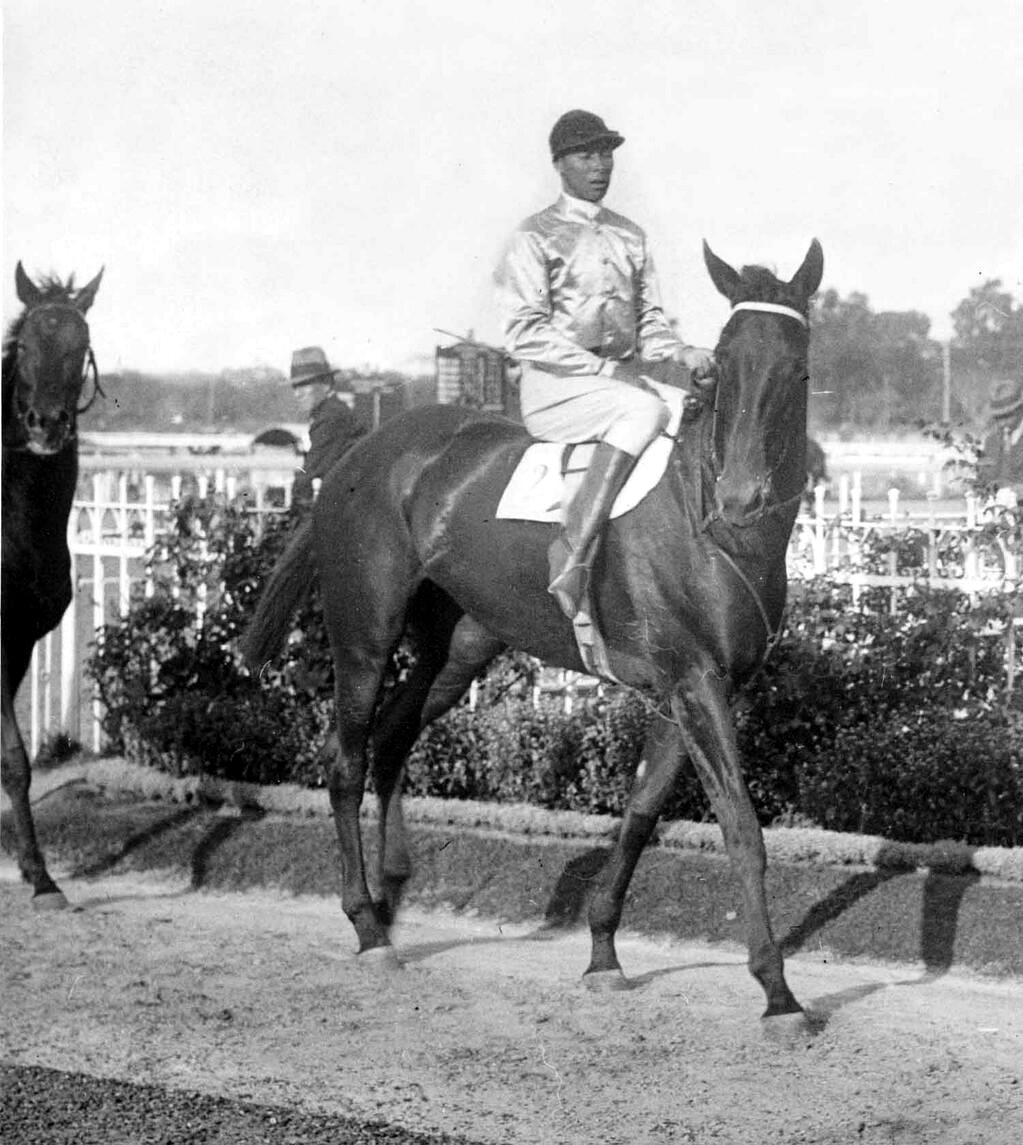
Irineo Leguisamo at the Hipódromo Argentino de Palermo in 1930.

Irineo Leguisamo (Arerunguá, Salto, Uruguay, 20 October 1903 - Buenos Aires, 2 December 1985) was a Uruguayan jockey. Also known as El Pulpo ("the octopus"), El Eximio ("the illustrious") or El Maestro ("the master"), he competed for over 57 years at racecourses in Uruguay and Argentina and was considered the foremost South American rider of the 20th century.

As of 2020, Leguisamo holds the record at Gran Premio Carlos Pellegrini with 10 wins.

== In popular culture ==
- Leguisamo was a close friend of tango singer Carlos Gardel, whose tango song Por una cabeza is about horse racing.
- He is mentioned in Se dice de mí, a milonga by Francisco Canaro and Ivo Pelay (1954), sung by Tita Merello.
- In 1925, Tita Merello premiered the tango "Leguisamo Solo" by Modesto Papavero, which had been written as homage to Leguisamo.
- Leguisamo was part of the cast in the film Hasta siempre Carlos Gardel.
