= Treaty of Benegas =

1820 treaty between Buenos Aires and Santa Fe

The Treaty of Benegas was a peace treaty signed by the Argentine provinces of Buenos Aires and Santa Fe on 24 November 1820.

== History ==
After the Batlle of Cepeda, on 1 February 1820, where the caudillo of Santa Fe Province, Estanislao López and Francisco Ramírez from Entre Ríos Province arrived in Buenos Aires to demand the dissolution of the national government and the end of Buenos Aires centralism. The victory allowed the provincial states that formed part of the United Provinces of the Río de la Plata to separate themselves from the central government, obtaining each of them "Provincial Autonomy".

On October 1 Martín Rodríguez was elected Governor of Buenos Aires Province, and achieved order in the province.

Martín Rodríguez established a peace accord between the factions. López accepted the mediation of Juan Bautista Bustos, Governor of Córdoba, with the aim of signing a new peace treaty with Buenos Aires.

Rodríguez decided to try to end the war with Santa Fe, to try to re-establish peace and security in the countryside. Estanislao López accepted to be in the negotiations, and to that end he had to quit the alliance with the Chilean caudillo Carreras.

Representatives of the provinces of Buenos Aires, Santa Fe and Córdoba met at the ranch of José Tiburcio Benegas, to reach an accord to end the war and agree to convene a congress in Córdoba. López wanted Buenos Aires to give him a monetary reward for the losses in his province during the war, but Martín Rodríguez could not promise to pay it. Juan Manuel de Rosas was the leader who ultimately agreed giving him 25,000 head of cattle.

Ramírez was not invited to the treaty, which brought an enmity and a later confrontation between the provinces of Santa Fe and Entre Ríos.

The treaty stipulated:

- Peace, harmony and good relations between the provinces of Buenos Aires and Santa Fe.
- A call for a National Congress in the city of Córdoba, with the objective to organize the country politically.
- The removal of all obstacles to peace.

== Articles of the Treaty of Benegas ==
Article 1: There will be peace, harmony, and good relations between Buenos Aires, Santa Fe, and their governments, leaving them in the current state; with their respective demands and rights to be discussed at the upcoming National Congress.

Article 2: The signatories will work towards the successful meeting of a Congress within the span of two months, sending their representatives to the City of Córdoba for now, until in agreement and unity they decide the permanent location for said Congress in the future.

Article 3: Commerce of arms and munitions will be free between the signatories.

Article 4: All prisoners of the respective provinces will be freed and sent to their neighbors.

Article 5: The Governments are required to remove from their territories all obstacles to peace, abiding by this treaty with all the measures and precautions needed to strengthen the ties of reconciliation and friendship between the signatories.

Article 6: This treaty will be approved and signed by their Excellencies, the Governors on this day, and within the following eight days it will be ratified by the respective Honorable Representative bodies.

Article 7: The Province of Córdoba acts as a guarantor, accepted by both parties; and so sign their representatives who have contributed to this accomplishment.

Written and sanctioned at the Estancia of the late Don Tiburcio Benegas at the side of Arroyo del Medio on the 24th of November of the year 1820, II° of the Freedom of South America.

== See also ==
- Treaty of Pilar
- Quadrilateral Treaty

== Bibliography ==
- Rins, Cristina E.; Winter, María Felisa (1996). La Argentina, una historia para pensar 1776-1996. Kapelusz. ISBN 950-13-2569-5.
