= Néstor Pitana =

Argentine football referee

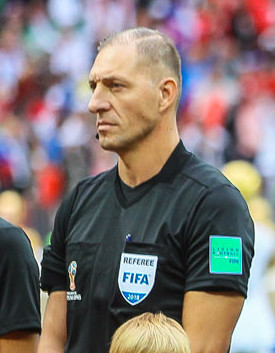
- Pitana at the 2018 FIFA World Cup
- Full name: Néstor Fabián Pitana
- Born: 17 June 1975 (age 51); Corpus, Argentina

Domestic
Years	League	Role

International
Years	League	Role
2010–2022	FIFA listed	Referee

Néstor Fabián Pitana (Spanish pronunciation: [ˈnestoɾ piˈtana]; born 17 June 1975) is an Argentine former football referee. He refereed at the 2014 FIFA World Cup, 2015 Copa América, 2017 FIFA Confederations Cup, 2018 FIFA World Cup and the 2021 Copa America. Pitana was selected to oversee the 2018 FIFA World Cup final between France and Croatia. He became the second referee to take charge of the opening game and a final in the same tournament, after fellow Argentinian Horacio Elizondo.

== Selected matches ==
=== 2018 World Cup final ===
Pitana's performance in the 2018 FIFA World Cup Final has seen significant controversy, mostly related to the use of Video Assistant Referee (VAR) technology. France's first goal was scored from a free kick that was seen by many as a dive from Antoine Griezmann (the rules at the time forbade VAR intervention). France's second goal was scored from a penalty given after Pitana was informed by VAR that he may wish to review the recording of Ivan Perišić's handball. After a lengthy deliberation, Pitana awarded the penalty to France, which many pundits called an incorrect interpretation of the rules.

=== 2021 Copa America ===
Pitana's decisions during the 2021 Copa America Group B game between hosts Brazil and Colombia faced significant controversy. At the 78th minute, Pitana continued the game on a ball that had hit his legs, which according to International Football Association Board rules, should have led to a stop of play. As the Colombian players stood still expecting play to be paused, Brazil scored, tying the match and eventually contributing to Brazil's 2–1 victory.

== FIFA World Cup record ==
2014 FIFA World Cup – Brazil
Date	Match	Venue	Round
17 June 2014	Russia – South Korea	Cuiabá	Group stage
22 June 2014	United States – Portugal	Manaus	Group stage
25 June 2014	Honduras – Switzerland	Manaus	Group stage
4 July 2014	France – Germany	Rio de Janeiro	Quarter-final
2018 FIFA World Cup – Russia
Date	Match	Venue	Round
14 June 2018	Russia – Saudi Arabia	Moscow	Group stage
27 June 2018	Mexico – Sweden	Ekaterinburg	Group stage
1 July 2018	Croatia – Denmark	Nizhny Novgorod	Round of 16
6 July 2018	Uruguay – France	Nizhny Novgorod	Quarter-final
15 July 2018	France – Croatia	Moscow	Final

== Statistics ==
Tournaments	Constester	Years	Matches	Yellow card	(yellow card) Average	Red card	(red card) Average
Primera División de Argentina	(Argentina) AFA–SAF	2007–	269	1275	4.74	89	0.33
(Argentina) Primera B Nacional	(Argentina) AFA	2006–2017	61	278	4.55	14	0.23
Copa Argentina	(Argentina) AFA	2011–	4	19	4.75	1	0.25
Supercopa Argentina	(Argentina) AFA	2014	1	4	4.00	0	0.00
(Argentina) Relegation	(Argentina) AFA	2009–2012	4	27	6.75	0	0.00
(Chile) Copa América	(Union of South American Nations) Conmebol	2015	2	8	4.00	1	0.50
(Union of South American Nations) Copa Conmebol Libertadores	(Union of South American Nations) Conmebol	2010–	34	158	4.64	7	0.21
(Union of South American Nations) Copa Conmebol Sudamericana	(Union of South American Nations) Conmebol	2010–	16	79	4.94	7	0.44
(Union of South American Nations) Recopa Conmebol Sudamericana	(Union of South American Nations) Conmebol	2012; 2015	2	11	5.50	2	1.00
(Ecuador) South American Under-17 Football Championship	(Union of South American Nations) Conmebol	2011	3	11	3.67	0	0.00
FIFA World Cup	FIFA	2014; 2018	9	23	2.56	0	0.00
FIFA Confederations Cup	FIFA	2017	2	5	2.50	0	0.00
FIFA World Cup qualification CONMEBOL	FIFA	2011–	10	52	5.20	3	0.33
FIFA World Cup Intercontinental play-offs	FIFA	2017	1	7	7.00	0	0.00
Friendlies	FIFA	2011–2012	2	11	5.50	0	0.00
2016 Río de Janeiro	IOC–FIFA	2016	2	5	2.50	0	0.00
Totals		2006–	422	1973	4.67	124	0.29
Matches as referee are correct as of 13 August 2018

Source: worldfootball.net

== Honours ==
- IFFHS World's Best Referee: 2018

Sporting positions (Argentina) Néstor Pitana
Preceded by 2014 FIFA World Cup Final (Italy) Nicola Rizzoli	2018 FIFA World Cup Final Referee	Succeeded by 2022 FIFA World Cup Final (Poland) Szymon Marciniak
