= Flag of Córdoba, Argentina =

Córdoba
- Use: Civil and state flag
- Proportion: 2:3
- Adopted: November 2023, 23; 2 years ago
- Designed by: Agustín Luján Díaz

The flag of Córdoba city is the official symbol of the capital of the Córdoba Province in Argentina. It was officially adopted by municipal resolution on 23 November 2023, following a public competition with the slogan "The whole city on one flag." The flag of the city of Córdoba is flown at official events, in educational institutions and public buildings, alongside the national flag and the provincial flag.

The flag consists of three horizontal stripes of equal width. The top stripe is red, the middle stripe white, and the bottom stripe yellow. At the center of the white stripe is a golden sun, taken from the emblem of the Society of Jesus, commemorating the Jesuits' historical and cultural heritage.

== Colour scheme ==
Colours scheme	Red	White	Gold	Yellow
RGB	151, 27, 47	255-255-255	140, 113, 76	234, 170, 0
Hexadecimal	#971B2F	#FFFFFF	#8C714C	#EAAA00
CMYK	0, 82, 69, 41	0, 0, 0, 0	0, 19, 46, 45	0, 27, 100, 8
Pantone	7427 C	White	873 C	124 C

== See also ==
- Flag of Córdoba Province, Argentina
