= José María Paz =

Argentine politician and military officer

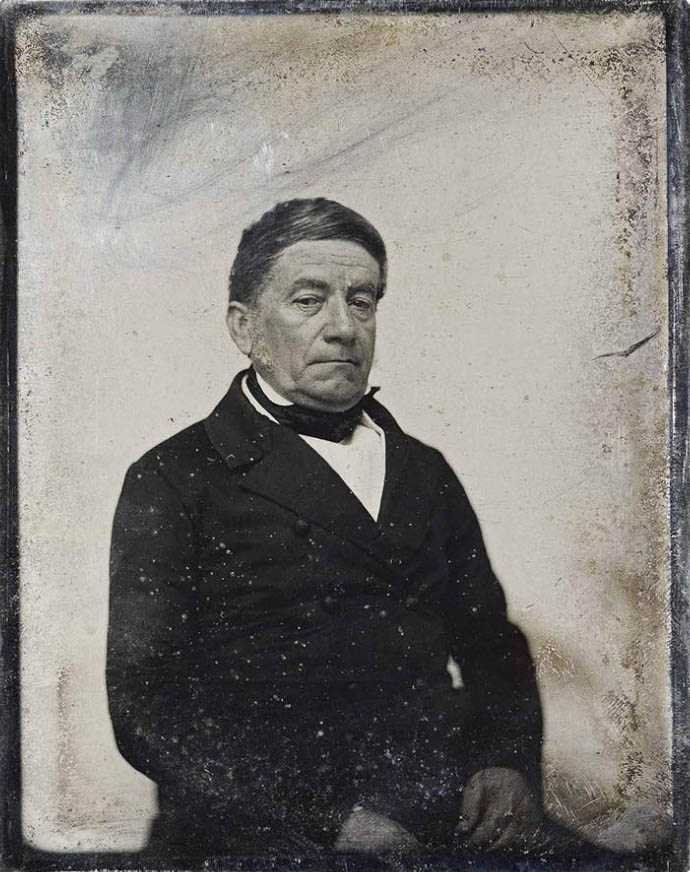
- José María Paz, c. 1850
- Born: José María Paz y Haedo; September 9, 1791; Córdoba, Viceroyalty of the Río de la Plata
- Died: October 22, 1854 (aged 63); Buenos Aires, State of Buenos Aires
- Occupation: Argentine military figure
- Known for: Brigadier active during the Argentine War of Independence and the Civil War
- Title: The Supreme Military Power of the League
- Term: July 5, 1830 – March 27, 1840
- Predecessor: Office established
- Successor: Office abolished
- Political party: Unitarian Party

Signature
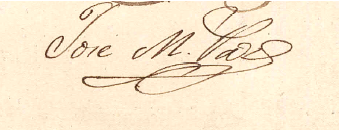

Brigadier General José María Paz y Haedo (September 9, 1791 – October 22, 1854) was an Argentine military figure, notable in the Argentine War of Independence and the Argentine Civil Wars.

== Childhood ==
Born in Córdoba, Argentina, the son of criollos José Paz and María Tiburcia Haedo, Paz y Haedo studied philosophy and theology at the Seminario de Loreto intern school, then at the Universidad de Córdoba, receiving his Bachelor of Arts degree with orientation in mathematics, Latin and law. After the May Revolution he joined the army that would fight the Royalists forces and allow the independence of Argentina. His brother, Julián Paz Haedo, born in 1793, was also an officer in the revolutionary army.

== Battles for the War of Independence ==
José Paz was sent to Upper Peru in 1811, and participated in the 1812 victories of the Army of the North, under General Manuel Belgrano. As assistant to Baron von Holmberg (Belgrano's secretary), he was awarded with the "Defenders of the Nation" insignia, and promoted to Captain.

Paz then participated, along with his brother, in the battles of Vilcapugio, Ayohuma, Puesto del Marquéz and in Venta y Media in which his arm was wounded and crippled; hence he became known as the "One-arm Paz" (El Manco Paz). In 1814, Supreme Director Juan Martín de Pueyrredón put him in front of the "Dragoons of the Nation" (Dragones de la Nación) battalions, and named him Coronel.

== Civil wars ==
In 1817, Belgrano was sent to fight the civil war that opposed Buenos Aires centralism. Paz was sent to fight Estanislao López, chief of the Federal forces, and beat him at La Herradura, Córdoba.

== Arequito revolt ==
On January 8, 1820, General Juan Bautista Bustos, followed by Alejandro Heredia and Paz himself, with the hope of staying away of the internal conflicts, organised a revolt within the forces that were near Arequito, returning to Buenos Aires in order to fight the Spanish forces once again.

They returned to Córdoba Province where Bustos attempted to take control of the province, against the will of Paz and others who intended to reach the northern border that was threatened by the Spanish and other Royalists. Paz, already a General, was separated from the army and sent to Santiago del Estero, where he spent two years away from politics. In 1823, he went to Catamarca Province to give instruction to some 200 soldiers, whom he had already led in battle in Salta Province, calling them the "Hunter Battalion" (Batallón de Cazadores), and he would again command during the war against Brazil.

== War against Brazil ==
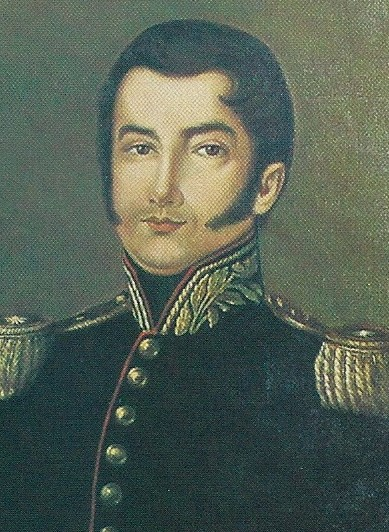
José María Paz

The Cisplatine War (known in Brazil as the Guerra da Cisplatina) pitted the two countries against each other for the territories at that time called Provincia Oriental (nowadays Uruguay) and the Misiones Orientales, occupied by the Brazilians since their victory of the Battle of Tacuarembó over José Gervasio Artigas in 1820. The war between Argentina and Brazil started in 1825 and it was concluded on August 27, 1828, with the Treaty of Montevideo by which Brazil and Argentina recognized Uruguay's Independence.

In the Battle of Ituzaingó, and in numerical inferiority, Paz gained terrain over the Brazilian forces, and later obtained their surrender. By order of president Bernardino Rivadavia he was named Commander General, the first one from military school in Argentina.

After the end of the war with Brazil, Paz returned to Buenos Aires, where General Juan Lavalle headed the Decembrist revolution and ordered him to prepare the army to combat the many caudillos that were emerging in the provinces. Thus, Paz supported the Unitarians, fighting the Federals in the civil war.

== Caudillos ==
In his writings, especially in Memorias, Paz tells about his astonishment to see farm owners fighting and declaring war against the central government, and the population supporting them.

Paz decided to start his campaign against the caudillos in Córdoba Province with a small force (about 1,000 men strong), many of them veterans who served under him in the Cisplatine War. He defeated Bustos in the Battle of San Roque on April 22, 1829, and took the seat of provincial governor. Bustos fled west to La Rioja, ruled by his friend and ally Facundo Quiroga and asked for help, but Quiroga was also defeated at the Battle of La Tablada on June 23; the superior military skills of Paz neutralised the caudillo's irregular and improvised methods of warfare.

Quiroga returned a year later, leading a larger, more powerful and disciplined army, only to face defeat a second time at the Battle of Oncativo (called by the Federals the Battle of Laguna Larga). By August 1830, nine of the fourteen Argentine provinces were united into the Unitarian League led by Paz. Ironically, it declared the Province of Buenos Aires, now under the federalist government of Juan Manuel de Rosas, its main enemy.

== Prisoner of López ==
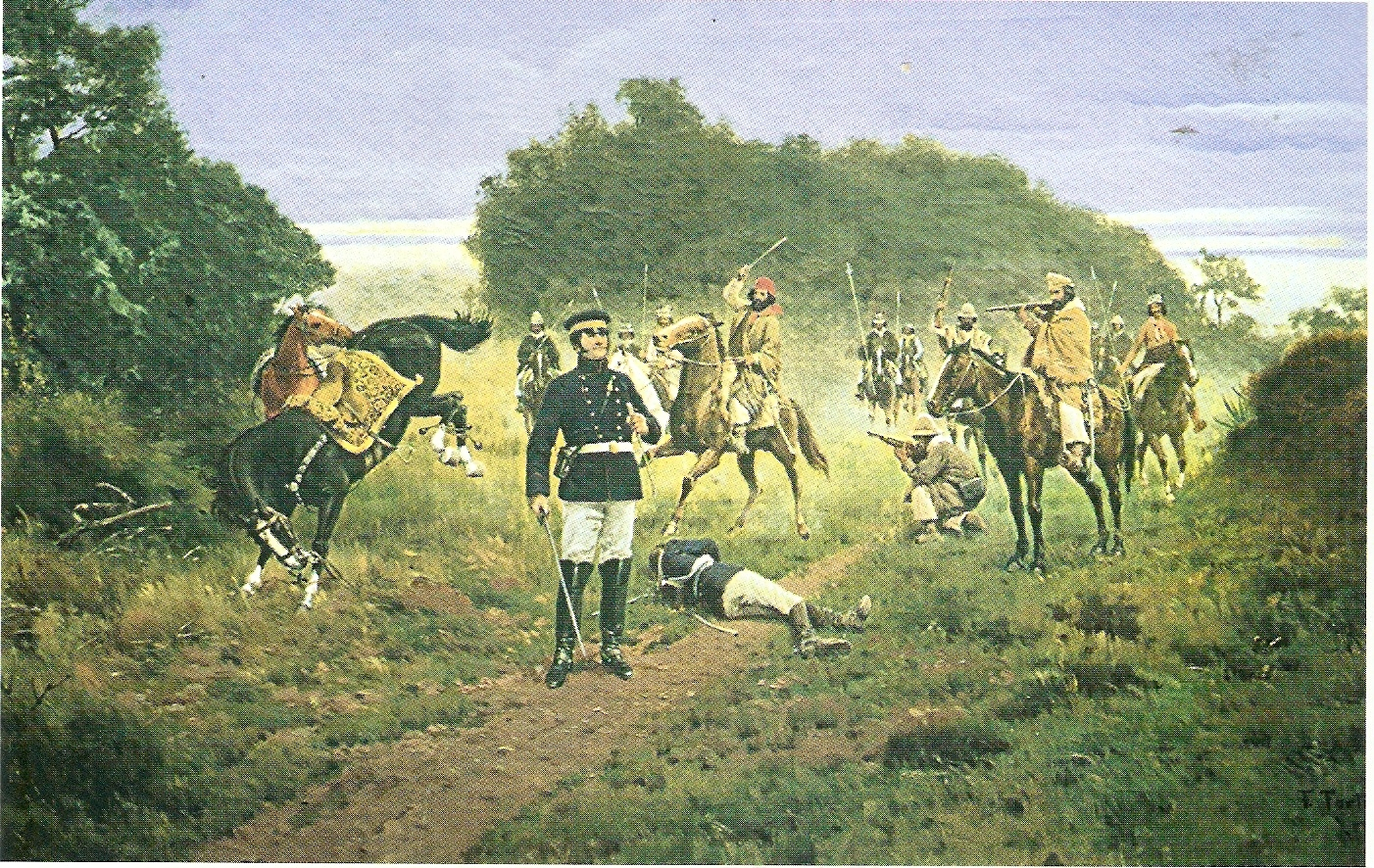
Capture of general Paz

The Federal Pact was signed in 1831 between the Provinces of Buenos Aires, Entre Ríos and Santa Fe, which joined to defeat the Unitarian League. As the federalist forces invaded Córdoba Province, Paz prepared to engage Estanislao López. He thus went on a reconnaissance mission to assess a good place to fight the caudillo, but the woods he was inspecting were not under the control of his forces but instead a small federal party of soldiers was patrolling it. He was captured and his army disbanded due to the absence of their able commander. The Unitarian League was now doomed.

General Paz was delivered to López in the city of Santa Fe, where he spent four years in prison, before being handed over to Juan Manuel de Rosas to spend yet another three years prisoner in Luján. Rosas had previously asked for Paz's head, but López refused to kill him. Yet upon the assassination of Facundo Quiroga in Córdoba, Paz was handed to Rosas, perhaps due to López' poor health condition.

== Life in prison ==
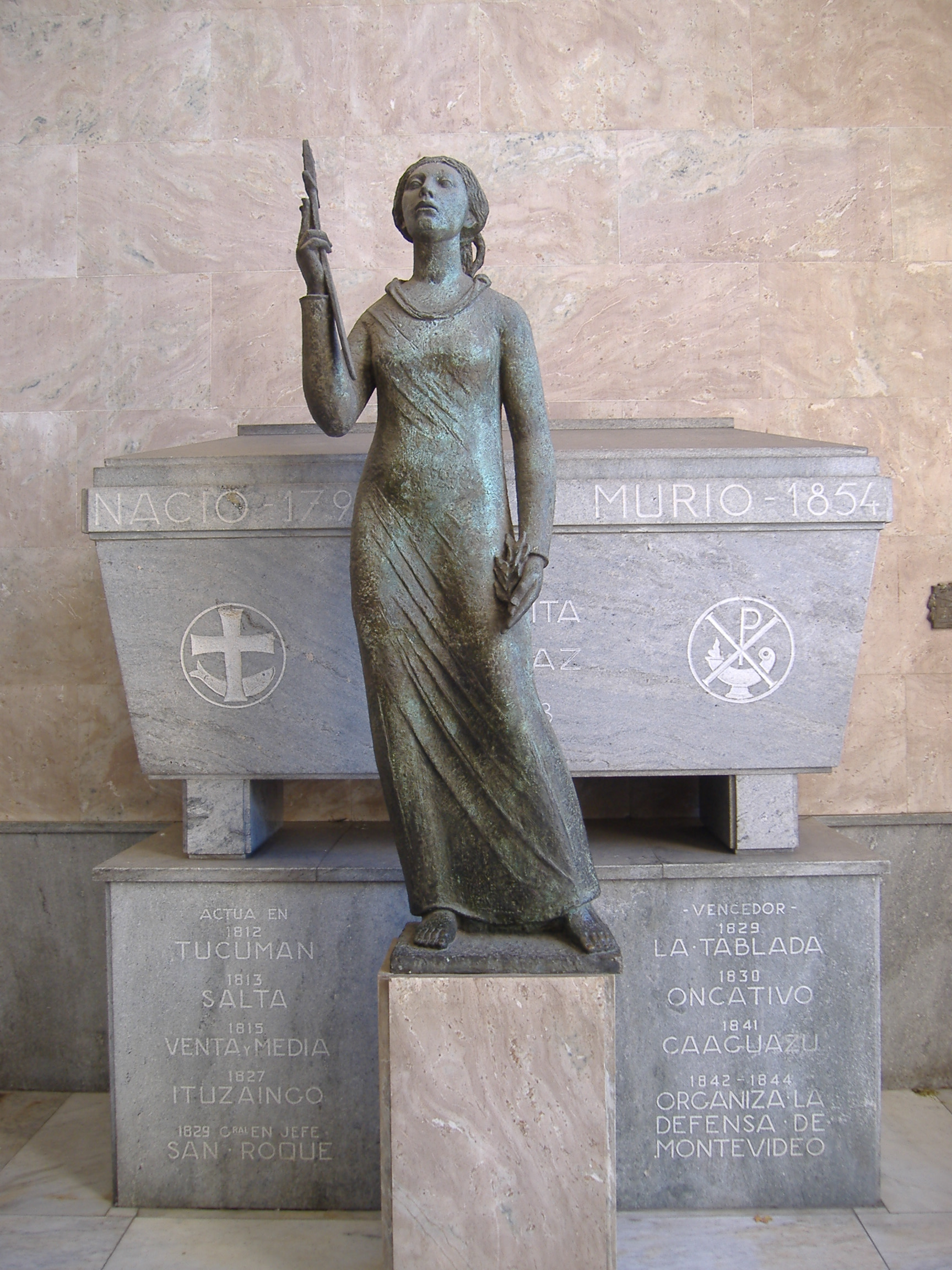
The resting place of Margarita Weild in the Cathedral of Córdoba. Behind it is a list of Paz's military feats.

During his time as a prisoner in Santa Fe, Paz started writing Memories ("Memoirs"). He also married on March 21, 1835, his niece Margarita Weild, who served him while in prison and became pregnant. He was then moved to Luján, to receive privilege freedom in April 1839, under oath of keeping away from Rosas' opponents. Fearing for the life of his wife and children, he escaped to Montevideo on April 3, 1840. In order to keep Paz from restarting his military activities, Rosas offered him a diplomatic mission in exile. Paz declined the offer and went to Corrientes to join the Unitarian army that was under the command of Juan Lavalle.

== Paz in Corrientes ==
By the time Paz arrived, Lavalle had been already defeated by the Federal caudillo Pascual Echagüe in the Battle of Sauce Grande (July 16, 1840). He decided to cross the Paraná River with the remnant of his forces to invade Buenos Aires and asked Paz to join him. Realizing that such a move would leave Corrientes undefended, Paz refused and decided to stay to help Governor Pedro Ferré organize the resistance to Echagüe. The two Unitarian chiefs (who were also close friends) said farewell to each other, never to meet again.

Once in Corrientes Paz had to deal with a number of shortcomings. The province was impoverished by years of civil struggle and so he had to build an army called Ejército de Reserva (Reserve Army) mostly with youngsters and teenagers, two hundred flintlock muskets, some gunpowder, and only a few of his old Hunters veterans of the war against Brazil. For this reason his green recruits were nicknamed by his enemies Escueleros de Paz ("Paz schoolboys"). However, he was greatly favored by Echagüe's timidity and indecisiveness, who gave him much needed time to organize his forces.

Both armies camped on opposite banks of Corrientes River, which roughly divides the province in half. After several months of inconclusive skirmishing and guerrilla warfare, by November 1841 Paz reckoned his Escueleros were battle-hardened enough to give his enemy a nasty surprise. Moreover, a small group of Lavalle's men who managed to escape the ultimate disaster of their leader returned to Corrientes and joined him. He crossed the river in full force by night on November 26, 1841, and engaged Echagüe the following two days, routing him completely in the Battle of Caaguazú, so named in Guaraní language after the ford used to cross the river.

In 1842 he invaded Entre Ríos, pursuing the battered remains of Echagüe's forces (who resigned his office as governor) and took La Bajada (present Paraná city), seizing the government in the province. Unfortunately for him and the Unitarian cause, Ferré had grown increasingly suspicious of him and wasn't too happy with this turn of events. Instead of supporting Paz, helping him to recruit more men in Entre Ríos and take the war to Buenos Aires (thus posing a serious threat to the power of Rosas), he ordered the withdrawal of the victorious army back to Corrientes, leaving Paz without support in Entre Ríos and forcing him to flee to Montevideo where he reunited with his family.

== Exile ==
While in Montevideo, Paz was named commander chief of the reserve army that faced Manuel Oribe's siege on Montevideo, which was supported by Rosas. Paz coordinated that army until mid 1843, when he returned to Corrientes through Brazil, to become Director of War against Rosas by the new governor of Corrientes, Joaquín Madariaga, and was given the command of the Fourth Army.

== Corrientes again ==
Knowing that Rosas intended to annex Paraguay as a province of the Confederation, Paraguayan president Carlos Antonio López signed with Madariaga and Paz on November 11, 1845, a treaty (Tratado de Alianza y Convicción Adicional). Together they planned to attack Entre Ríos, debilitated by Justo José de Urquiza absence and, if possible, reach Buenos Aires.

Yet Madariaga and Paz did not trust each other. Madariaga took away Paz's command, but Paz already expecting such move, attacked and defeated Madariaga, taking him prisoner at Laguna Limpia. Paz moved to the Ubajay swamps at Easter Entre Ríos, and Urquiza, fearing to face Paz, fell back to the west of the province.

== Last years ==
Political instability forced him to leave Corrientes and start a journey to Paraguay that would extend to Rio de Janeiro, Brazil. Submersed in poverty, he settled as a farmer. His wife died on June 5, 1848, while giving birth to their ninth child, leaving Paz the task of raising the children, of which six died at a young age. Paz continued during those years his memoirs that he had started while imprisoned.

When news of Urquiza's uprising against Rosas reached him, Paz travelled to Montevideo to await Urquiza's triumph. On September 11, 1853, already in Buenos Aires, Urquiza named him, yet unconvinced, General Brigadier, and governor Manuel Pinto asked him to talk the provinces into favoring Buenos Aires' position. Buenos Aires abstained from participating in the Constitution and prepared an attack. Paz was named General-in-Chief and moved to the border with Santa Fe Province.

Later Hilario Lagos besieged Buenos Aires and Paz had to organise the resistance. General Pinto thus named him Minister of War and Navy of the State of Buenos Aires. In spite of Paz's visible position against the Buenos Aires Constituent Congress, he was elected member of the convention, which he did not attend regularly due to health problems. On April 11, 1854, day of the approval of the constitution, he was present to express his disagreement with the document that declared Buenos Aires an independent state.

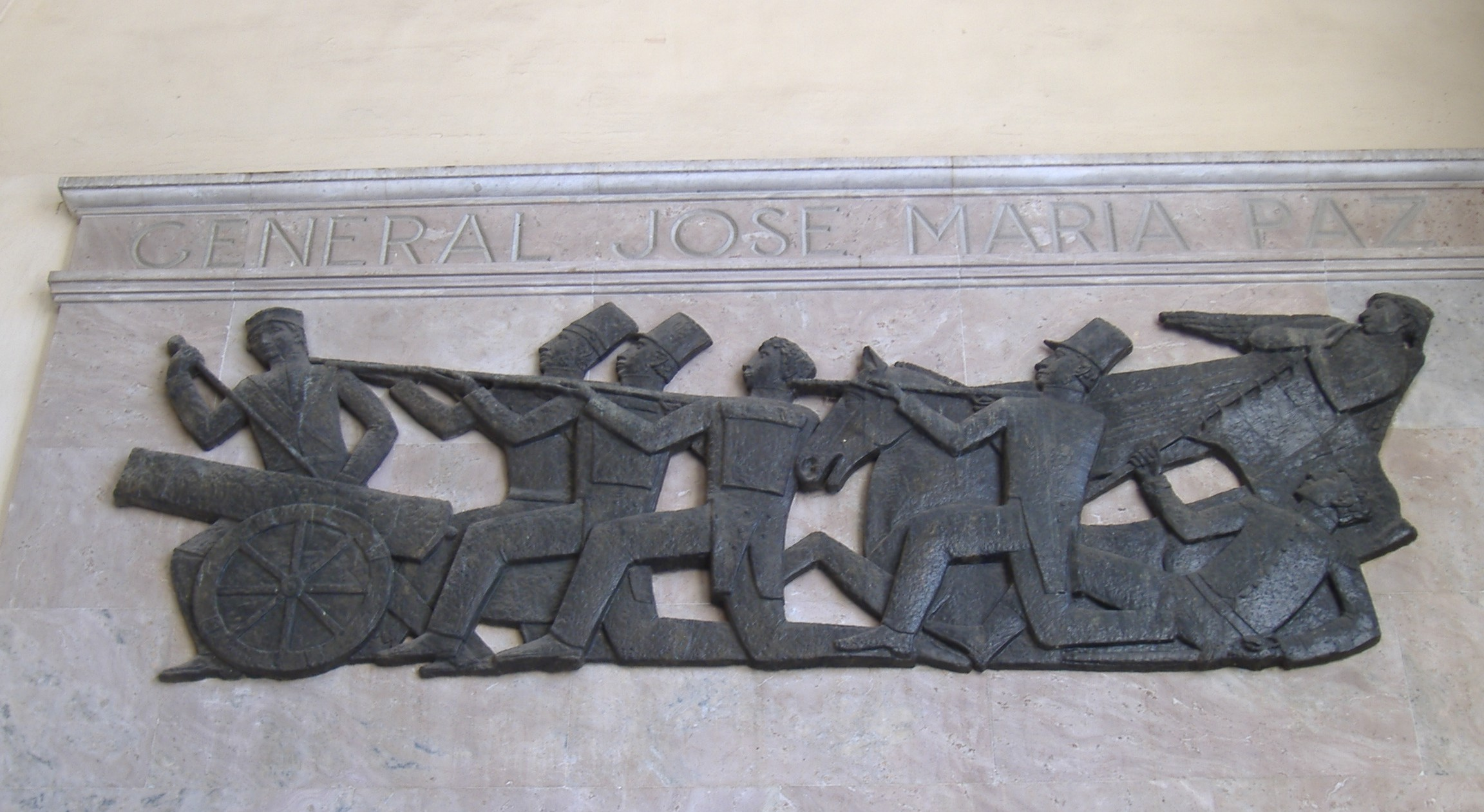
Detail of the Tomb of General Paz in the Cathedral of Córdoba

That was his last political act; he died a few months later, and was buried with highest honours for his patriotism. During Domingo Sarmiento's presidency, his body was taken to the Córdoba Cathedral, together with the recuperated remains of his wife.

The highway that separates the federal capital, Buenos Aires, from Buenos Aires Province was named General Paz Avenue after the cordobés who organised the defence of Buenos Aires.
