= Flag of Entre Ríos Province =

Argentine historical flag

Entre Ríos Province

The flag of the Argentine province of Entre Ríos is a version of the historical Artigas flag. The flag consists of a white horizontal stripe between two light blue and light red bend. The current flag was adopted on 13 March 1987, and in 2013, Flag Day was established to celebrate the birthday of José Gervasio Artigas, June 19.

== Symbolism ==
Artigas flag in the Uruguayan version

The flag adopted in 1987 restored the use of the historic flag used during the Argentine War of Independence by the League of the Free Peoples. The original flag was created by the League commander José Gervasio Artigas based on an earlier blue and white flag introduced by Manuel Belgrano. Artigas added red to it as a symbol of federalism. In Uruguay, whose border with Argentina runs mostly through the province of Entre Ríos, the Artigas flag is one of three national flags, although the Uruguayan version is standardized differently from the Entre Ríos flag. The Uruguayan flag has a 2:3 proportion and a distinctly dark shade of blue, while the Entre Ríos flag shares technical specifications with the Argentine flag, namely a 1:2 proportion and a light shade of blue.

== History ==
=== League of the Free Peoples and Republic of Entre Ríos ===
The first version of the League flag (c. 1815)

The origins of the flag date back to 1815, when José Gervasio Artigas created it for an alliance of six provinces known as the League of Free Peoples. The first version consisted of three blue-white-blue bands, with each blue band having a horizontal red band inside. Each perforated band (red) represented the eastern and western bands of the Río de la Plata on the same flag. Later, Artigas changed the two horizontal bars to two diagonal ones, and then to one diagonal one, to clearly distinguish his flags from similar flags of his opponents. The final design was not created directly by Artigas but by José María de Roo, a customs official from Montevideo and an expert in heraldry. De Roo likely served as a consultant to Artigas, though the exact nature of their collaboration and the extent of Artigas's influence on the design remain unclear.

After the fall of the League following the Portuguese invasion of Banda Oriental, the flag continued to be used on the west side of the Uruguay River by Santa Fe and Entre Ríos. This changed in 1820 when Francisco Ramírez, Governor of Entre Ríos defeated Artigas and came into conflict with Estanislao López, Governor of Santa Fe. In September 1820, Ramírez created a republic from the territories he controlled. The declaration he issued included several references to Artigas's tricolor flag, which he retained as his own. The republic came to an end a year later when, during the campaign in Santa Fe, Ramírez was betrayed by one of his commanders, Lucio Norberto Mansilla, and then killed after being captured by López's troops.

=== Second flag ===
Flag adopted by Lucio Norberto Mansilla (1822–1824)

After the restoration of the province of Entre Ríos by Governor Lucio Mansilla in 1821, on 12 March 1822, the provincial congress banned the use of the federal flag and any other flags used and instead introduced new symbols. The Belgano flag was reused as the basis for the new Entre Ríos flag, but the Sol de Mayo was replaced with a newly created coat of arms. Little is known about the actual use of this flag, nor is it certain what shade of blue was used. The shade had political significance at the time, as the Federalists used navy blue and their rivals in the Unitarian Party used light blue. Following Mansilla's resignation in 1824, during the government of Juan León Solas, the Ramírez flag informally returned to the province along with the national flag, although it was not formalized due to factional fighting in the following years.

=== Third flag ===
Flag adopted by Pascual Echagüe (1833–1853)

One of the flags of the Jordanist rebellion (11 April 1870 – 16 December 1876)

One of the flags of the Jordanist rebellion (11 April 1870 – 16 December 1876)

On December 28, 1833, during the term of office of Pascual Echagüe, the provincial legislature promulgated a new provincial flag through a law that supplanted the use of the national flag:

Art. 1°. The blue and white flag that has been used by the Province until now will not be used in the fortresses, ports or ships under its control, much less in its army.
Art. 2°. From now on, only a tricolour flag with three horizontal stripes will be used, the central one being white, the sides blue and red, with the blue one being placed in the upper part up to the middle of the flag and the same shield in the centre.

This flag was also used by the next governor, Justo José de Urquiza, and the troops he commanded, including during the famous Battle of Caseros in 1852. However, a year later, the province was placed under the direct administration of the president of the Argentine Confederation, and the flag was abandoned. The reason was that Urquiza became president, and since Buenos Aires was under the control of the Unitary Party, the capital of the Confederation was temporarily moved to Paraná. The province was re-established on 1 May 1860. The province no longer officially uses its own flag.

In the 1870s, the flag introduced by Echagüe was used by Jordanist rebels. The rebel flags did not always include the provincial coat of arms, sometimes it was the Argentine national coat of arms, or the flag was blank. After the collapse of the uprising, the province did not have its own flag until the current design was adopted more than 100 years later.

=== Current flag ===
The current flag was declared the official symbol of the province by Decree No. 879/1987 MGJE of 5 March 1987, issued by Governor Sergio Montiel.

Law No. 9385/02, passed on 17 January 2002 added details regarding the colors of the flag, specifying that the red shade of the diagonal stripe should be "intense". The flag was declared a mandatory symbol in patriotic ceremonies, civic and institutional events in the province. It was also established that both the provincial flag and the national flag should be displayed on public buildings, and that both receive equal honors.

Law No. 10220/13, passed on 18 June 2013, established June 19 as "Flag Day of the Province of Entre Ríos". This date commemorates the birth of José Gervasio Artigas. An obligation was also introduced to include content related to the flag in educational programs at all levels of education.

== See also ==
- Artigas flag
- Flag of Santa Fe Province
- List of Argentine flags
