= Republic of Entre Ríos =

Country in South America (1820–1821)

Coordinates: 30.0000°S 59.0000°W

- 1820–1821
- Flag Seal

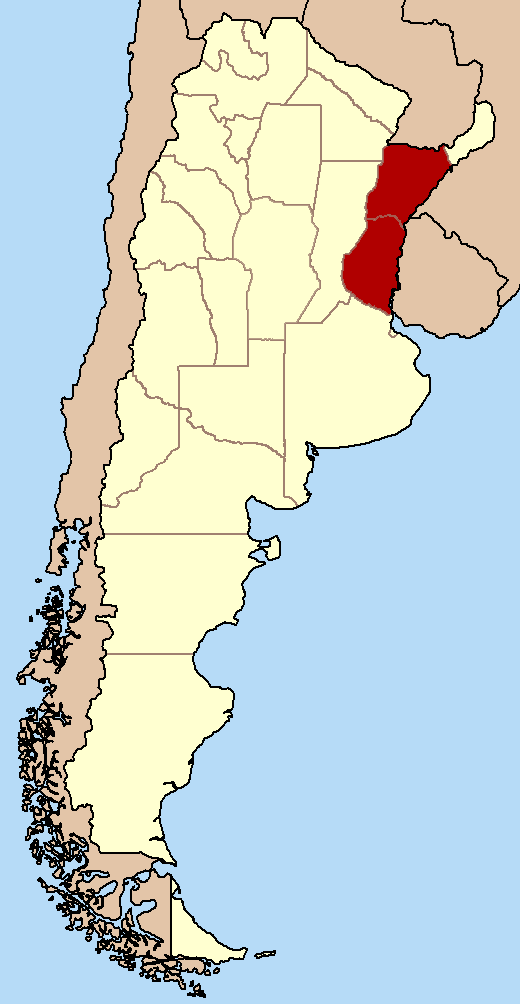
- Republic of Entre Ríos (modern-day Argentine provinces of Entre Ríos and Corrientes)
- Status: Unrecognized state
- Capital: Concepción del Uruguay
- Government: Republic
- Jefe supremo
  - 1820–1821: Francisco Ramírez
  - 1821: José Ricardo López Jordán
- History
  - Established: September 29 1820
  - Ramírez assassinated: July 10 1821
  - Disestablished: 28. September 1821
Preceded by	Succeeded by
Liga Federal	United Provinces of South America
- Today part of: Argentina

The Republic of Entre Ríos was a short-lived republic in South America in the early nineteenth century. Comprising approximately 166,980 km^{2} (64,470 sq mi) of what are today the Argentine provinces of Entre Ríos and Corrientes, the country was founded in 1820 by the caudillo General Francisco Ramírez (who styled himself jefe supremo, supreme chief) and lasted only one year. On September 28, 1821, Lucio Norberto Mansilla was elected Governor of the Province of Entre Ríos, and the Republic was subsequently dissolved.

In spite of the "Republic" in its title, Ramírez never really intended to declare an independent Entre Ríos. Rather, he was making a political statement in opposition to the monarchist and centralist ideas that back then permeated Buenos Aires' politics. When in April 1821 Ramírez began the campaign that led to his death, he issued a proclamation titled Proclama del Gobernador de Entre Ríos don Francisco Ramírez, Jefe Supremo de la República de Entre Ríos, a los compatriotas de Buenos Aires y su campaña (Proclamation of the Governor of Entre Ríos Don Francisco Ramírez, Supreme Chief of the Republic of Entre Ríos, to the compatriots of Buenos Aires and its countryside), making clear that he considered himself a provincial governor within the same nation as Buenos Aires.

== History ==
=== Occupation of Corrientes and southern Misiones ===
While his lieutenants pursued José Gervasio Artigas throughout the territory of Misiones, Ramírez occupied the Corrientes on 19 September 1820.

In June 1820, San Antonio del Salto Chico (present-day Concordia) experienced the total exodus of its Artiguista Guaraní inhabitants following the defeat of their leader; they crossed the Uruguay River and took refuge on the bank of the Banda Oriental opposite San Antonio del Salto Chico, drawn there by the former Artiguista leader of Mandisoví, Domingo Manduré, who had joined the Luso-Brazilian side. Manduré received from the Luso-Brazilian commander Carlos Federico Lecor the rank of lieutenant colonel and command of his town of emigrant Guaraníes.

=== Creation of the Republic ===
Ramírez held the first elections in the region, as he called on the towns to proceed to elect the Supreme Chief of the Republic. The elections were held in December 1820, with Ramírez unanimously elected.

=== Occupation of Misiones ===
Sití had evacuated part of the population of Asunción del Cambay toward the depopulated town of San José, in order to repopulate it and recover the yerba mate plantations, while at the same time maintaining communication with the Portuguese brigadier Francisco das Chagas Santos in São Borja.

Ahora marcho yo con todo el vecindario que eran de los quince pueblos para nuevamente poblar Misiones y pienso de formalizar una Capital en Santo Tomé y en San José otro pueblo y en Cambay (...) Al capitán Aripí ordené a esos pueblos de arriba para que los echen a esos hombres correntinos que están beneficiando Yerba sin mi consentimiento (...) (Now I march with all the inhabitants who were from the fifteen towns to repopulate Misiones anew, and I intend to establish a capital in Santo Tomé and another town in San José and in Cambay (...) I ordered Captain Aripí to those upper towns so that they expel those Corrientes men who are harvesting yerba without my consent (...))

— Letter from Sití to Father Isidro Sosa

This led to the breakdown of relations with Ramírez, who, alarmed, sent invasion forces into Misiones to prevent the occupation of the yerba plantations. Commander Juan González Alderete entered Asunción del Cambay on 9 December, finding it deserted after its abandonment by the corregidor Miguel Javier Ariyú. The latter managed to defeat González Alderete at Paso de Higos the following day and crossed the Uruguay River into missionary territory occupied by Portugal since 1801. Commander Gregorio Piris advanced through the northern Iberá and defeated Sití at Paso de San Borja, near Santo Tomé, on 13 December 1820, prompting much of the population of Misiones to take refuge in Portuguese territory. From that point onward, Misiones ceased to have a commander general, with Ramírez instead appointing local commanders.

Nicolás Aripí, who had been appointed by Sití to guard the towns of Candelaria, Santa Ana, Loreto, Corpus, and his camp at San Ignacio—all of which had been looted and burned by Paraguay in 1817—submitted to Ramírez, and Piris left him as commander of those towns and custodian of the natural yerba plantations, together with the cacique Juan Nicolás Cristaldo. Aripí also controlled the depopulated towns of San Carlos and San José, abandoned after being looted by the Portuguese in 1817. He also exercised some control over the camp (capilla) of Asunción del Caá Caray (in the upper Aguapey River), and the yerba plantations north of San Javier. The latter, along with the towns of Mártires, Concepción, Santa María, Apóstoles, and Santo Tomé, had been devastated in 1817 by the Portuguese and were abandoned. The exploitation of yerba mate was divided between the missionaries of Aripí and the Entre Ríos commanders along the Uruguay River.

=== Planned invasion of Paraguay ===
In his aim of recovering the Banda Oriental, which was occupied by the Portuguese, Ramírez sought to form an alliance with José Gaspar Rodríguez de Francia, who commanded a powerful army. As Francia did not respond to his correspondence, Ramírez decided to invade Paraguay and incorporate it into the United Provinces of the Río de la Plata, to recruit thirty thousand men as a preliminary step toward creating a large army to oppose the Portuguese.

Ramírez concentrated forces in the city of Corrientes at the beginning of December 1820, from where he wrote to Estanislao López:

Esta empresa ha sido hasta ahora un anhelo frustrado de los pueblos de la Liga del Litoral. Yo cuento con que el señor Gobernador de Santa Fe me enviará quinientos milicianos, el escuadrón de dragones y el batallón de pardos y morenos de la ciudad. Con el mismo fin me he dirigido al gobernador de Buenos Aires pidiéndole un contingente de dos mil reclutas, como está convenido en la Convención del Pilar; y no dudo de que el general Bustos atenderá también mis indicaciones sobre el particular. (This enterprise has so far been a frustrated aspiration of the peoples of the Litoral League. I expect that the governor of Santa Fe will send me five hundred militiamen, the squadron of dragoons, and the battalion of pardos and morenos of the city. With the same aim I have addressed the governor of Buenos Aires requesting a contingent of two thousand recruits, as agreed in the Treaty of Pilar; and I do not doubt that General Bustos will also heed my indications on the matter.)

— Letter from Ramírez to Estanislao López

He soon managed to assemble more than 3,000 to 4,000 men and a regular squadron for the enterprise, and according to José Luis Busaniche, “he would undoubtedly have destroyed Francia, and Paraguay would today be a province of the Argentine Republic.” Francia had 3,000 professional and well-equipped men. In addition, he built ships and launches as the basis of the Paraguayan Navy.

=== Organization of the Republic ===
The republic would be short-lived, but the work carried out there by Ramírez was intense. He enacted regulations: for the Military Order (30 articles); for the Political Order (41 articles); for the Economic Order (51 articles); for the Stamped Paper (28 articles); and for the Extraordinary War Stamps (6 articles), eliminating import duties. These regulations were drafted by Cipriano José de Urquiza and José Simón García de Cossio.

=== Territorial division ===
Ramírez divided the territory into four departments or commandancies. To the commandancy of La Bajada he assigned the territories that had depended on Santa Fe until 1810 and added the district of Esquina between the Corriente and Guayquiraró rivers, disputed by Santa Fe and Corrientes (which possessed it) and assigned to Entre Ríos in 1814 when the provinces of Entre Ríos and Corrientes were created by decree of Buenos Aires. To the commandancy of Misiones he assigned the territories north of the Miriñay River up to the Paraná River, between the Uruguay River and the Iberá marshes (territories of the Guaraní Missions). To the commandancy of Concepción del Uruguay he assigned the territories that had depended on Buenos Aires until 1810 and added the Misiones sector between the Yeruá Stream and the Miriñay River, and the Corrientes district of Curuzú Cuatiá south of the Miriñay and Corriente rivers (assigned to Entre Ríos in 1814 when the provinces of Entre Ríos and Corrientes were created). The commandancy of Corrientes was reduced to the sector between the Paraná River, the Iberá, the Tranquera de Loreto, and the Corriente River.

=== Census and registration ===
The census register consisted of five columns: names (and kinship), patria (place of birth), age, status (marital), and occupation (trade and other data). The enumerated population was 56,753 people, of whom 36,697 corresponded to the department of Corrientes (including Curuzú Cuatiá) and 20,056 to the departments of Paraná (including Esquina and Sauce) and Uruguay. Owing to the state of unrest, the census was not carried out in the department of Misiones.

The first completed enumeration was that of the town of Itatí on 8 October 1820, while in Entre Ríos the order was published and enforced by Ricardo López Jordán on 13 October 1820 and was carried out between November 1820 and January 1821. The population of the towns in the departments of Entre Ríos was: Paraná (4,284), Concepción del Uruguay (1,223), Santa Rita de la Esquina (907), Gualeguaychú (755), Gualeguay (559), Nogoyá (538), Rosario del Tala (261), and La Matanza—now Victoria—(181). The town of Mandisoví had been left almost depopulated, and the port of San Antonio del Salto Chico completely deserted. Other populated localities recorded in Entre Ríos were Alcaraz, Ensenada, Villaguay, Feliciano, Chilcas, Raíces, and Las Moscas.

=== End of the Republic ===
The Republic of Entre Ríos did not survive Ramírez, who at the age of 33 was killed on 10 July 1821 by Francisco de Bedoya in the brief Battle of Chañar Viejo, near Villa de María de Río Seco and San Francisco del Chañar in Córdoba. On 26 July, the Entre Ríos squadron was destroyed by that of Zapiola in the Naval combat of Colastiné, with its commander Monteverde killed aboard the felucca La Correntina.

==== López Jordán ====
For a short time, Ramírez was succeeded by his half-brother and delegate in government, Ricardo López Jordán, who, in order to legitimize his rule, decided to call elections to choose Ramírez's successor. These elections were conducted indirectly in a third-degree system: citizens elected one deputy or elector for each district. Each citizen cast his vote on a ballot signed by himself, which he placed in a ballot box secured with two locks.

However, Colonel Lucio Norberto Mansilla, head of a regiment stationed in Paraná, rose in rebellion on 23 September with the backing of the governor of Santa Fe, a Buenos Aires squadron under Matías Zapiola, and the caudillo Eusebio Hereñú. Mansilla assumed political and military command of Paraná and on 28 September had himself elected governor with the title of general-in-chief liberator and provisional governor. Both sides agreed to a truce until the meeting of a congress on 25 October, but on 20 October Hereñú defeated Gregorio Piris in the Battle of Gená, after which López Jordán, Cipriano de Urquiza, Piris, and Mariano Calvento went into exile in Paysandú. On 23 October Hereñú occupied Concepción del Uruguay, which was looted by Santa Fe troops following the defection of its military commander, Pedro Barrenechea. The Republic was considered dissolved; Mansilla, allied with Santa Fe and Buenos Aires, was elected constitutional governor on 16 December 1821.

News of Mansilla's uprising led to the restoration of autonomy by the province of Corrientes. Carriego kept Ramírez's death secret, and Mansilla warned him:

Abra Vd. los ojos y elija lo mejor. La amistad me obliga á prevenirle que la justicia castigará con severidad á los que tenaces se presentan á seguir los pasos de un gobierno tan ignorante como torpe. La provincia se halla con fuerzas de 2,000 hombres en combinacion con las de Santa Fé. Si Vd. no quiere decidirse, manténgase en quietud ó neutral. (Open your eyes and choose what is best. Friendship obliges me to warn you that justice will severely punish those who stubbornly persist in following the path of a government as ignorant as it is clumsy. The province has forces of 2,000 men in combination with those of Santa Fe. If you do not wish to decide, remain quiet or neutral.)

On 6 October 1821, the general commander of the navy, Pedro Ferré, appeared before Carriego and secured a promise that the departmental commander would remain inactive. That same day, Ferré went into the countryside and began assembling a contingent of 800 men from San Cosme, Itatí, San Luis del Palmar, and Caá Catí, with which he advanced on the city of Corrientes. Carriego was deposed without bloodshed and arrested on 12 October 1821, when the commander of the civic companies, Juan José Fernández Blanco, and Nicolás Ramón de Atienza—in coordination with Ferré and with the support of the sailors—summoned an open cabildo, which appointed Nicolás Ramón de Atienza provisional governor until a constituent congress should sanction a constitution and appoint a constitutional governor. On that same day, the 12th, Atienza sent communications to the governor of Santa Fe, to Zapiola, to Mansilla, and to López Jordán announcing the autonomy of Corrientes as a federated province. Atienza convened a provincial congress, and on 18 October Ferré's troops arrived in the city of Corrientes.

== See also ==
- History of Argentina
- List of extinct states
