= Corpus, Misiones =

Corpus
- Municipality and village
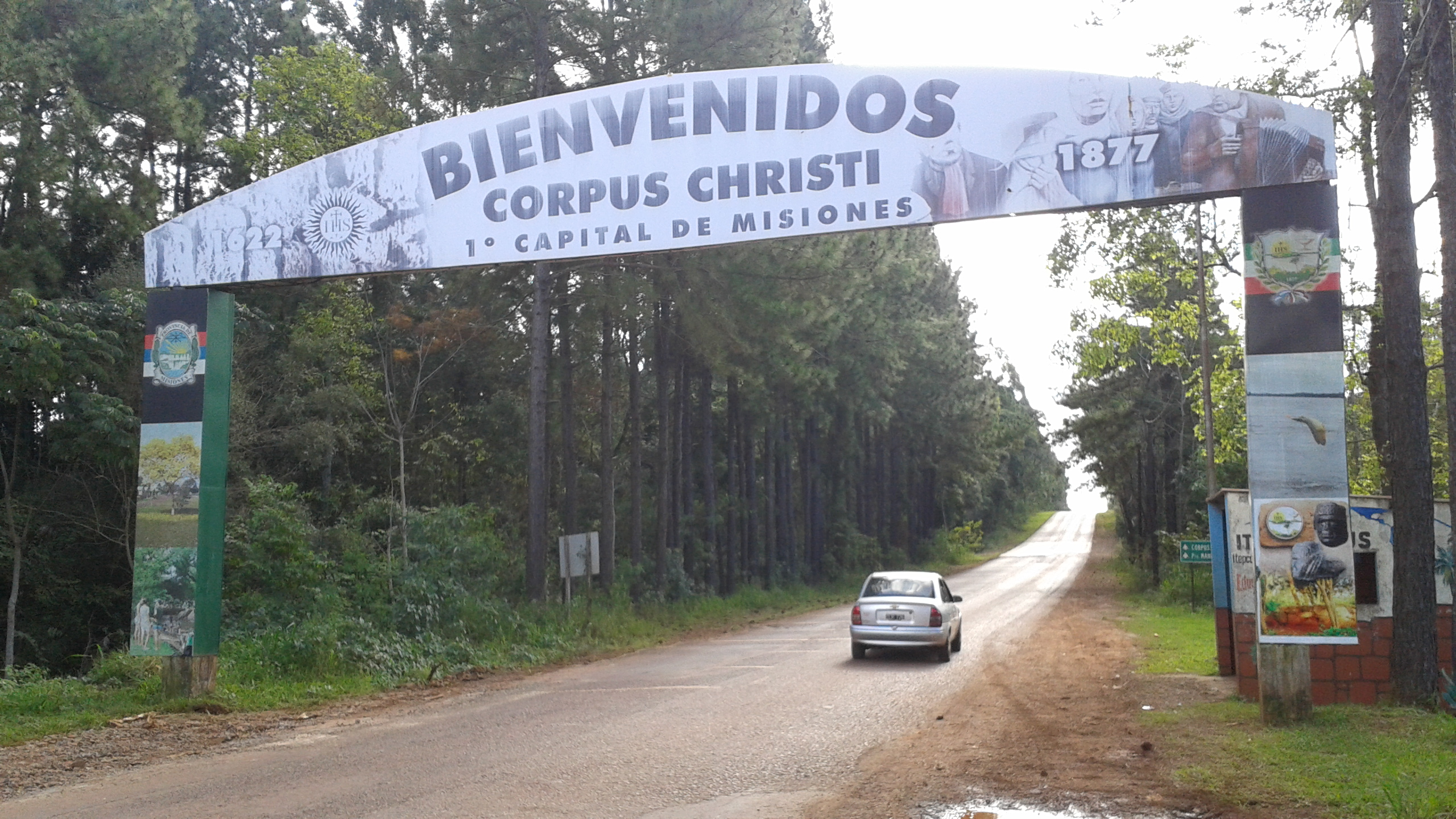

- Location within Misiones Province Location within Argentina
- Country: Argentina
- Province: Misiones
- Department: San Ignacio
- Time zone: UTC−3 (ART)

Corpus is a village and municipality in Misiones Province in north-eastern Argentina.
