= Juan Bautista Bustos =

Argentine politician and military leader

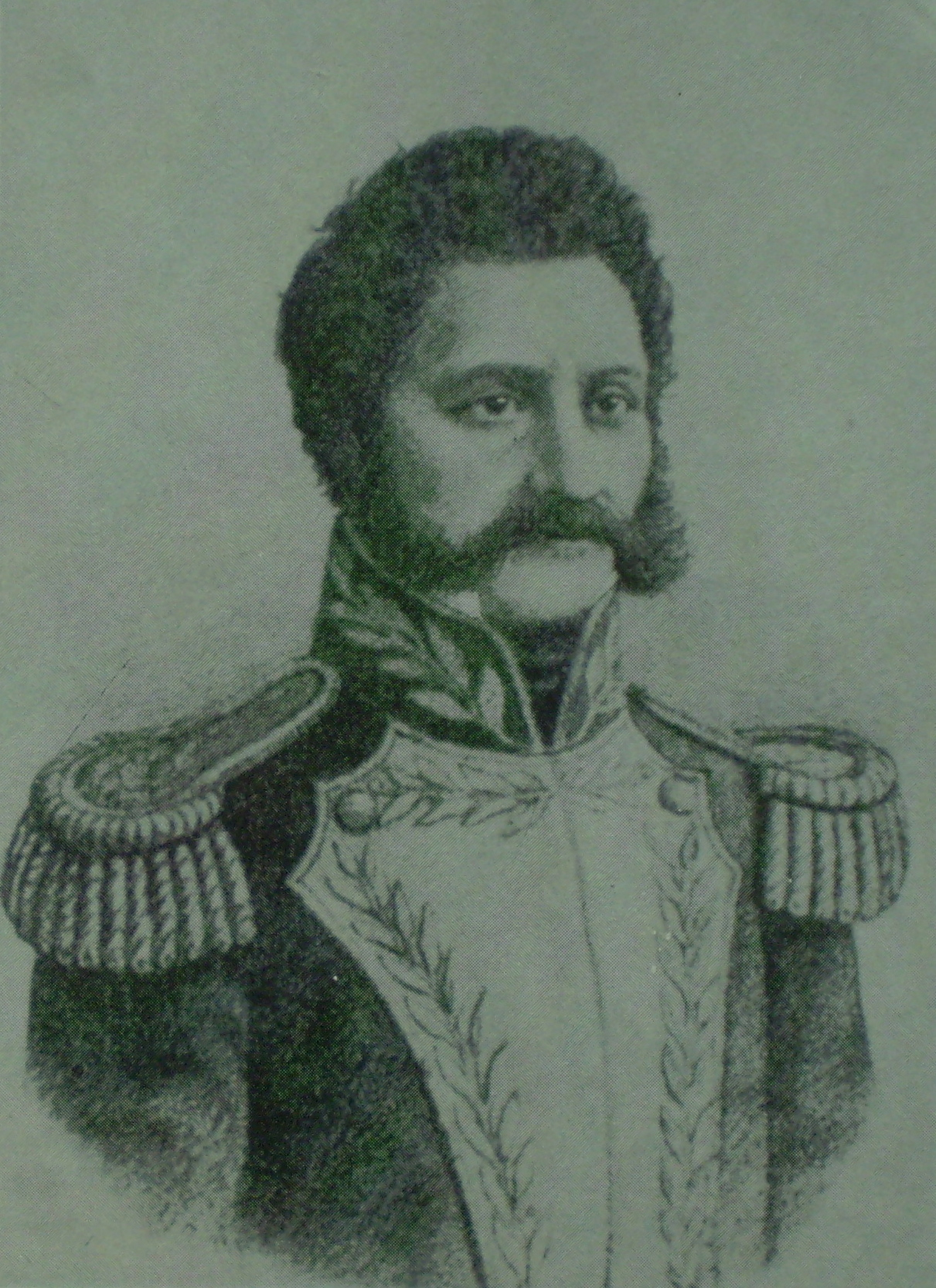
- Born: August 29, 1779; Córdoba, Viceroyalty of the Río de la Plata
- Died: September 18, 1830 (aged 51); Argentina, Santa Fe, Santa Fe
- Predecessor: José Javier Díaz
- Successor: José María Paz
- Political party: Federalist Party (Argentina)
- Spouse: María Juliana Maure
- Parent(s): Pedro León Bustos and María Tomasina de la Puebla

Juan Bautista Bustos (August 29, 1779 - September 18, 1830) was an Argentine politician and military leader who participated in the British invasions of the River Plate and the Argentine Civil Wars. In 1820, he became the first constitutional Governor of Córdoba.

== Early Military Career ==
In 1806, Juan Bautista Bustos was captain in the militias that marched from Córdoba to liberate Buenos Aires during the first British Invasion. After the city's Reconquista, he joined the Battalion of Arribeños.

In 1807, facing the second British Invasion, he led a troop of 30 soldiers against a British fort of the 88th Regiment and achieved their surrender. For his valor, he was promoted to Lieutenant Colonel of the Arribeños.

He participated in the May Revolution of 1810 as one of its principal proponents in the provinces.

In April 1811, he was assigned as a member of the Tribunal of Public Security. However, upon the fall of Cornelio Saavedra's sector, he was removed from his military command.

He worked as a merchant until 1812, when—with the fall of the First Triumvirate—he rejoined the active service as a colonel in command of the 2nd Infantry Battalion.

== Army of the North ==
In 1815, the Supreme Director of the United Provinces of the Río de la Plata, Ignacio Álvarez Thomas, assigned Bustos to the Army of the North. However, Bustos did not participate in the Battle of Sipe-Sipe because the governor of Salta, Martín Miguel de Güemes, prevented him from reaching the army, suspecting Bustos had been sent to depose him.

Once in the Army of the North, he became a trusted official of the general Manuel Belgrano and reached the rank of Senior colonel, although he did not participate in any of the campaigns of the Upper Peru.

Despite his provincial origins, when internal conflicts broke out between the Director and the provinces seeking greater autonomy, Bustos remained loyal to the former. In 1816, he fought against Juan Francisco Borges, the Caudillo from Santiago del Estero, and in 1818 against Estanislao López, the governor of Santa Fe, who defeated Bustos in Fraile Muerto.

In 1819, the governor of Buenos Aires tried once more to break up the Federal League and launched a campaign against López. On the 18th and 19 February, Bustos battled against López in the Battle of La Herradura, which ended without a clear victor. On March 10, fighting broke out in Las Barrancas, Córdoba, as López's forces moved in on those of Juan José Viamonte, the commander from Buenos Aires. On April 12, an armistice was signed in San Lorenzo, although the peace lasted only a few months, and in November hostilities resumed.

== Governor of Córdoba ==
Bustos returned to Córdoba with 2500 men, where he was proclaimed Governor by the Constituent Assembly of the province and sworn in on March 24. As governor, Bustos sought to strengthen ties with the rest of the country. He kept close relations with José de San Martín and with Güemes, although he did not send the Army of the North to the latter's aid. Bustos made peace with López and took part in a short civil war against the caudillo of Entre Ríos, Francisco Ramírez, and against the Chilean José Miguel Carrera, whom he defeated in Cruz Alta (Córdoba).

Bustos played an important role in the Treaty of Benegas of November 1820, sending representatives from Córdoba. This achieved a truce between the provinces and an agreement to convene a National Congress in January 1821. However, this did not materialize in the face of opposition from Buenos Aires, especially by the minister Bernardino Rivadavia.

His political base in Córdoba was the rural population, some ranchers, the lower clergy, and some groups that had followed José Gervasio Artigas. He oversaw a stable, progressive government, marked by tolerance for its opposition. On January 30, 1821, he approved the Constitution of Córdoba, which praised individual rights and liberties. On September 26, 1822, he created the Junta Protectora de Escuelas, with the aim of promoting elementary education in rural areas.

== Reelection ==
At the end of his term on February 25, 1825, his party proposed him for reelection, but the Provincial Congress of Córdoba instead assigned the role to José Julián Martínez, a moderate Unitarian. This enraged Bustos's followers, who with the help of the commanders of rural militias, dissolved the Congress and elected new representatives. On March 30, 1825, these confirmed Bustos as governor once again.

The Federalist position held by Bustos clashed with the aims of the Unitarian, Rivadavia, who from Buenos Aires sought to consolidate the central power. Bustos removed the representatives that had supported Unitarianism in the General Congress of 1824 and, like all but two of the provincial governments, rejected the Constitution of 1826.

To resist the centralist advance from Buenos Aires, Bustos sought the aid of Facundo Quiroga, urging him in a letter to oppose the aims of Rivadavia:

"We must make these servile men see that we are not tribal chieftains, but lovers of the liberty of our country and our peoples."

As Rivadavia's government fell into disrepute, Bustos launched, in May 1827, a proposal to base the republic on federalist principles. Bustos was one of the first governors to give responsibility over foreign affairs to Manuel Dorrego, the federalist governor of Buenos Aires following Rivadavia's resignation.

== Defeat and death ==
Bustos's prestige and successful administration made him a natural leader or caudillo of the provinces; consequently, he became one of the main targets of the Unitarian reaction following Dorrego's assassination. In particular, his former comrade and fellow Córdoban but fervent Unitarian, José María Paz—the most skilled Unitarian military commander—marched on Córdoba, where he had "old debts" to reclaim. Among these was not only his expulsion from the province eight years earlier, but also the scarce participation of Bustos in the ill-fated campaign on the Upper Peru and the Cisplatine War.

Unable to resist Paz's advance on the city of Córdoba, Bustos retreated to San Roque (now covered by the waters of San Roque Lake). He negotiated a truce with Paz, granting him leadership of the province and agreeing to elections in which neither candidate could participate. Meanwhile, he sought to buy time until the arrival of Quiroga, who was then marching from La Rioja to his aid. However, Paz attacked Bustos unexpectedly on April 22, 1829, in the Battle of San Roque, resulting in Bustos's total defeat.

Bustos escaped to La Rioja, seeking Quiroga's help. Quiroga mustered a force of troops from his own province and Córdobese militias to confront Paz, under the command of Bustos. They fought Paz's forces at La Tablada on June 22, 1829. Paz's forces, though outnumbered, defeated Bustos. During his retreat, he was ambushed by a patrol off the coast of the Primero River. To evade capture, Bustos rode his horse into the water. He sustained thoracic trauma, but survived and found refuge among the gauchos in the area. After a few days, he reached the city of Santa Fe, where he was welcomed by Estanislao López. But his health had severely deteriorated, and he died on September 18, 1830.
