= Arequito =

- Town
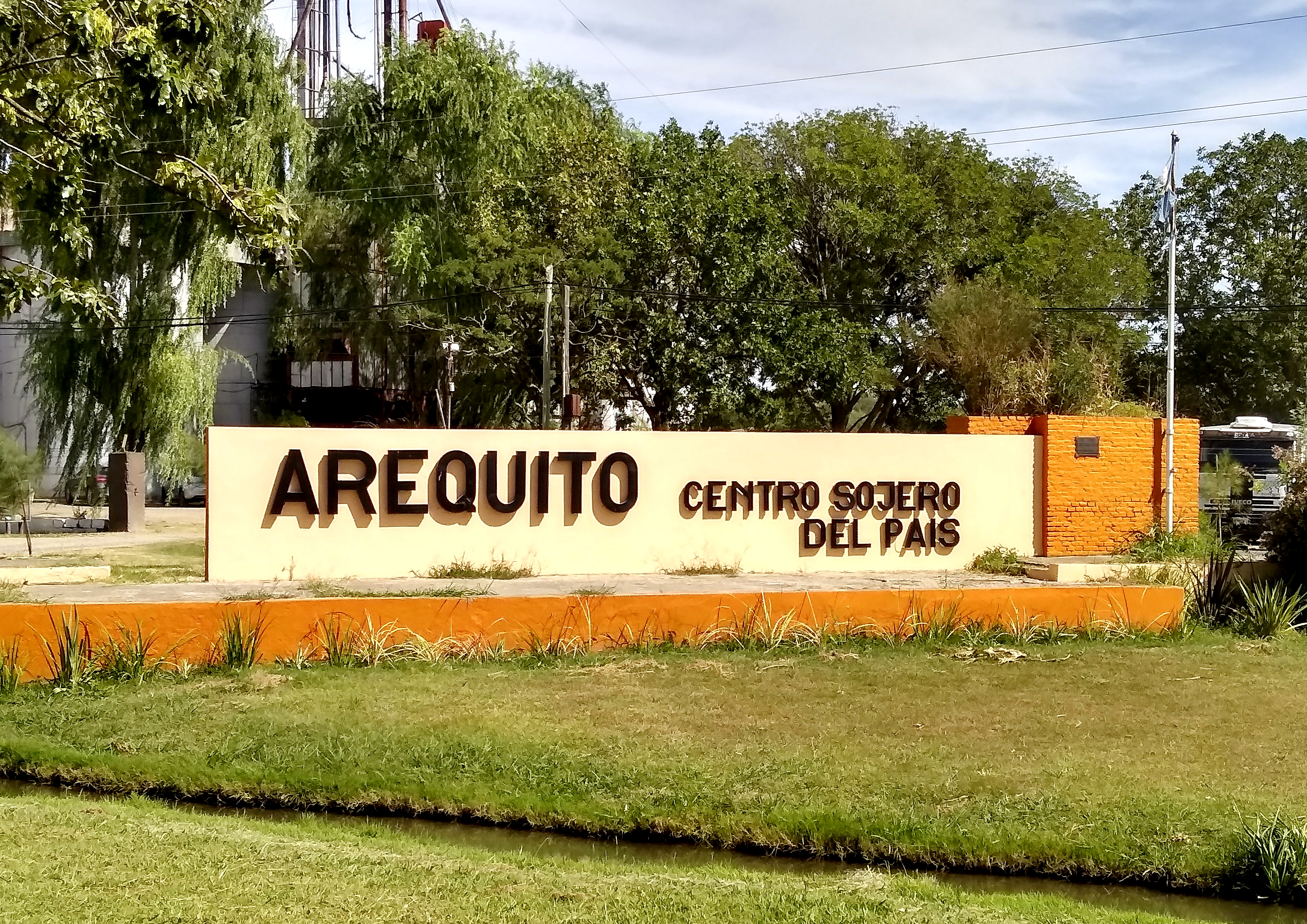

- Location of Arequito in Argentina
- Coordinates: 33°9′S 61°28′W
- Country: Argentina
- Province: Santa Fe
- Department: Caseros

Government
  - Communal President: Nicolás Carotti (UCR)

Area
  - Total: 503 km^{2} (194 sq mi)

Population
  - Total: 6,934
  - Density: 13.8/km^{2} (35.7/sq mi)
- Time zone: UTC−3 (ART)
- CPA base: S2183
- Dialing code: +54 3464

Arequito is a town (comuna) in the south of the province of Santa Fe, Argentina, 248 km (154 mi) southwest from the provincial capital and 90 km (56 mi) west of Rosario. It has a population of about 7,000 inhabitants as per the 2001 census [INDEC].

The town was founded initially as a waystop (posta) by Braulio Areco in 1778. He ended up using a diminutive of his surname because there were already two postas de Areco in Buenos Aires (Carmen de Areco and San Antonio de Areco). It became a colonist settlement, and in time it was recognized officially as a town, on 1 June 1891. The area received an important influx of immigration (mostly from Europe, and also Syrian-Lebanese) during the second half of the 19th century, and became a highly productive agricultural area. Since 1970 it produces soybean (the town is the seat of the National Festival dedicated to this crop, held every October).

Arequito became nationally known in the 1990s, as the hometown of the young folk singer and composer Soledad Pastorutti.
