= Arerunguá =

Coordinates: 31°40′00″S 56°15′00″W

The place Potreros de Arerunguá or simply Arerunguá is located in the center and north of Uruguay on the homonymous stream, the Arroyo Arerunguá. It extends over territories that are currently part of the departments of Salto and Tacuarembó.

Its historical importance lies in having been a refuge for the Charrúas as a result of the gradual Spanish colonial expansion, then during the revolutionary independence period and finally in the first decades of independent Uruguay, until their almost total extermination in the Massacre of Salsipuedes in 1831.

According to the historian Carlos Maggi in his book El Caciquillo, this may have been one of the places where José Gervasio Artigas lived during his "years in the desert", the name usually given to the long period when Artigas was between 14 and 33 years of age. Maggi investigates the possibility that it was among the Charrúas that José Artigas had his first partner and his first son, later known as Manuel Artigas and nicknamed "El Caciquillo".

In February 1805 Artigas requested and obtained from Commander Francisco Javier de Viana, representative of the Viceroy, over 105,000 hectares (260,000 acres) of land in Arerunguá.

This, then, would be the place chosen by José Gervasio Artigas, Protector of the Free Peoples, as the center of operations and headquarters of the Ejército Oriental (Eastern Army) during the period of the Gesta Artiguista in the Río de la Plata.

These characteristics place Arerunguá as a region of enormous historical value, given that it was where substantial elements of the "orientality" that distinguishes the essence of the Uruguayan nation emerged and matured.
