= Francisco Ramírez (governor) =

Argentine governor

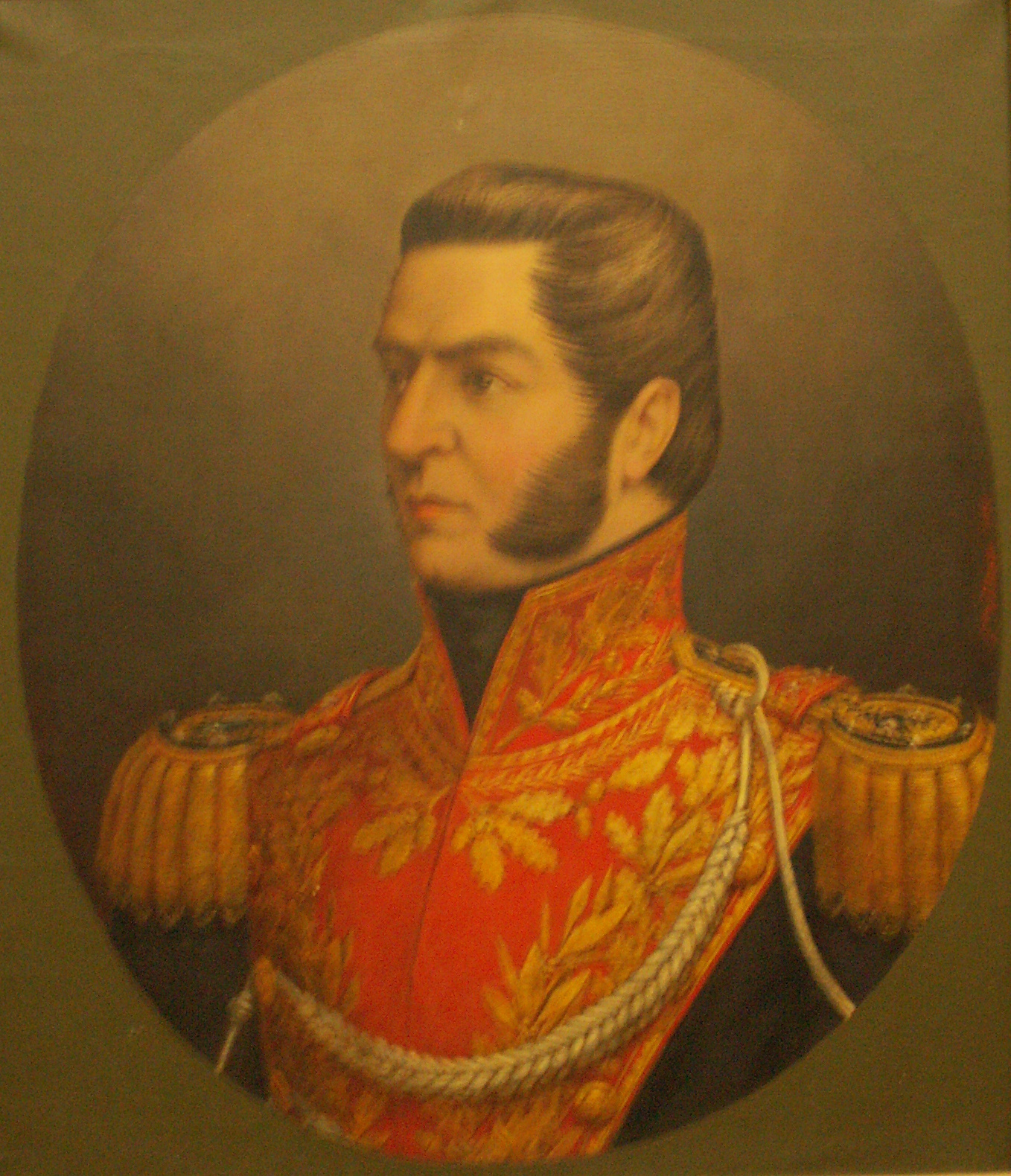
Francisco Ramírez (fictitious portrait)

Francisco Ramírez, also known as "Pancho" Ramírez as well as "El Supremo Entrerriano" (1786–1821), was an Argentine governor of Entre Ríos during the Argentine War of Independence.

== Concepción del Uruguay ==
Francisco Ramírez was born at Concepción del Uruguay in 1786. The son of a Paraguayan merchant and a half-brother of Ricardo López Jordán, he achieved fame when young in the military of his birth town.

He joined the patriots in 1810, working with Díaz Vélez and Rondeau. At the outbreak of the May Revolution he served in the patriot army. In October 1811, the town's soldiers recaptured it for the patriots, directed by Ramírez among others.

He acquired notoriety for fighting alongside the federal leader José Gervasio Artigas with Ricardo López Jordán. They fought in the Banda Oriental against the Royalists.

Faithful to Artigas, when the Buenos Aires Director declared his opposition to Artigas, Ramírez defended him, fighting under Eusebio Hereñú, Artigas' deputy in the region. After the defeat of the Baron von Holmberg, the commander of the centralist side, Ramírez joined Hereñú to defend the Banda Oriental against the Portuguese invasions. The Banda Oriental was finally conquered by the Empire of Brazil. Ramírez and Hereñú also took Santa Fe Province in alliance with Estanislao López.

== Ramírez, general of Entre Ríos ==
Once governor of Entre Ríos, Ramírez allied with Estanislao López, from Santa Fe, against Buenos Aires. The Supreme Director Juan Martín de Pueyrredón attempted a conciliatory policy and made a pact with Hereñú to reincorporate Entre Ríos into the Buenos Aires faction. Ramírez took arms against Hereñú and defeated him in 1817. He was in charge of the Uruguay River region as a deputy for Artigas. The Paraná River and La Bajada region were officially in the hands of other men, but in practice they were run by Ramírez.

With the eastern forces occupied by defending against the Portuguese, Ramírez had to face the directorial army that invaded his province in 1818. He defeated the colonel Luciano Montes de Oca. He attacked with his troops who had just landed in the vicinity of the Arroyo de la China, and on 9 March he blocked the invasion by General Marcos González de Balcarce near Paraná. Not long after, he had to defend against Iuso-Brazilian attacks in his own province.

The same year he advanced across Corrientes Province, deposing the governor who had been put in place by the Director. But the acute confrontation with the Buenos Aires forces made him highlight his half-brother Ricardo López Jordán who was helping Estanislao López, who had been attacked by Juan Ramón Balcarce, and a little later he found himself facing Hereñú again.

Among the leaders of that time, Ramírez stands out as one of the most capable; he was never defeated, even after being betrayed and outnumbered. Various chroniclers testified that his troops were very disciplined, far better than those of Artigas or López, and they were regularly uniformed. They fought in perfect order and followed the orders of their superiors with more precision than the troops of other leaders, including those of the Director.

== Biography ==
José de San Martín prepared the crossing of the Andes. José Miguel Carrera, who was prevented from returning to Chile, joined Carlos María de Alvear against Pueyrredón, and called both López and Ramírez in their support. San Martín refused to return with the Army of the Andes to support Buenos Aires, and Ramírez and López prevailed at the Battle of Cepeda, signing the Treaty of Pilar with the city.

Ramírez and López became rivals afterwards. López considered Ramírez a threat to national organization, as well as Bustos from Córdoba and Martín Rodríguez from Buenos Aires. Ramírez was still supported by Carrera. They prepared an attack to Santa Fe, but they were defeated. He was defeated again at Río Seco and escaped, but his wife was captured. Ramírez died in an ill-fated attempt to rescue her, he was killed and his body was beheaded.

== See also ==
- Republic of Entre Ríos
