= Governors of San Juan, Argentina =

The Governors of San Juan Province, Argentina since Argentina became independent have been the following

== Lieutenant governors ==
Term	Governor	Portrait
April 1812; January 1812	Saturnino Sarassa (primer Lieutenant governor, Intendencia de Cuyo)	
1812; 1812	Manuel Corvalán (Lieutenant governor)	
1 January 1812; 9 January 1822	José Ignacio de la Roza	

== Governors from 1820 to 1884 ==
Term	Governor	Portrait
1 March 1822; 21 March 1822	Mariano Mendizábal (1er governor de autónomo)	
21 March 1822; 24 March 1822	Francisco Solano del Corro	
24 March 1822; 10 August 1822	José Ignacio Maradona	
10 August 1822; January 1822	José Antonio Sánchez	
January 1822; 10 January 1822	José María Pérez de Urdininea	
10 January 1822; 26 June 1822	Salvador María del Carril	
27 June 1822; 8 September 1822	Plácido Fernández Maradona	
9 September 1822; 12 September 1822	Salvador María del Carril	
13 September 1822; 12 March 1822	José Navarro	
12 March 1822; 17 January 1822	José Antonio Sánchez	
17 January 1822; 30 November 1822	Manuel Gregorio Quiroga Carril	
30 November 1822; 6 April 1832	Timoteo Maradona	
6 April 1832; 17 December 1832	Juan Aguilar	
17 December 1832; 3 April 1832	Hipólito Pastoriza	
3 April 1832; 29 April 1832	José Tomás Albarracín	
29 April 1832; 4 May 1832	Valentín Ruiz	
4 May 1832; 9 January 1832	José Martín Yanzón	
9 January 1832; 26 February 1832	José Luciano Fernández	
26 February 1832; 13 August 1841	Nazario Benavídez	
14 August 1841; 22 August 1841	Mariano Acha	
22 August 1841; 8 October 1841	José Manuel Quiroga Sarmiento	
8 October 1841; 29 May 1852	Nazario Benavídez	
29 May 1852; 8 August 1852	Zacarías Yanzi	
8 August 1852; 11 January 1852	Nazario Benavídez	
11 January 1852; 18 March 1852	Francisco Díaz	
18 March 1852; April 1852	Nazario Benavídez	
April 1852; 8 September 1852	Nicanor Molinas (Intervención federal)	
8 September 1852; 28 December 1852	Manuel José Gómez Rufino	
28 December 1852; 24 January 1852	Galán, García, Derqui (Intervención federal)	
24 January 1852; 15 November 1862	José Antonio Virasoro	
16 November 1862; 29 December 1862	Francisco Coll	
29 December 1862; 7 December 1862	Antonino Aberastain	
11 January 1862; 19 February 1862	Juan Saá (Intervención federal)	
19 February 1862; 1 March 1862	Filomeno Valenzuela	
1 March 1862; 3 January 1862	Francisco Díaz	
3 January 1862; 9 April 1862	Domingo Faustino Sarmiento	
9 April 1862; 13 June 1862	Santiago Lloveras	
13 June 1862; 24 July 1862	Saturnino de la Presilla	
24 July 1862; 9 October 1862	José Manuel Zavalla	
9 October 1862; 5 January 1862	Camilo Rojo	
5 January 1862; 6 April 1862	Juan de Dios Videla	
6 April 1862; 23 August 1862	Camilo Rojo	
23 August 1862; 6 October 1862	Santiago Lloveras	
6 October 1862; 28 March 1862	José Manuel Zavalla	
28 March 1862; 4 August 1862	Ruperto Godoy	
4 August 1862; 16 May 1872	José María del Carril	
16 May 1872; 13 December 1872	Valentín Videla	
13 December 1872; 21 January 1872	Benjamín Bates	
21 January 1872; 19 February 1872	Faustino Espínola	
19 February 1872; 18 May 1872	Uladislao Frías	
18 May 1872; 5 November 1872	Manuel José Gómez Rufino	
5 November 1872; 8 December 1872	Sandalio Echeverría	
8 December 1872; 12 May 1872	Hermógenes Ruiz	

== Governors from 1875 to 1930 ==
Term	Governor	Portrait
12 May 1872; 12 May 1872	Rosauro Doncel	
12 May 1872; 28 January 1882	Agustín Gómez	
28 January 1882; 12 May 1882	Manuel María Moreno	
12 May 1882; 12 May 1882	Anacleto Gil	
12 May 1882; 12 May 1882	Carlos Doncel	
12 May 1882; 1882	Federico Moreno	
1882; 12 May 1892	Manuel José García	
12 May 1892; 12 May 1892	Alejandro Albarracín	
12 May 1892; 12 May 1892	Domingo Morón	
12 May 1892; 12 May 1892	Carlos Doncel	
12 May 1892; 12 May 1902	Abraham Vidart	
12 May 1902; 12 May 1902	Enrique Godoy	
12 May 1902; 7 February 1902	Manuel Godoy	
7 February 1902; 8 February 1902	Carlos Sarmiento; Saturnino Oro; Juan Luis Sarmiento	
8 February 1902; 15 February 1902	Ramón A. González	
15 February 1902; 1 May 1902	Cornelio Moyano Gacitúa	
1 May 1902; 12 May 1902	Manuel Gregorio Quiroga	
12 May 1902; 12 May 1912	Carlos Sarmiento	
12 May 1912; 20 June 1912	Ángel Dolores Rojas	
20 June 1912; 12 May 1912	Pedro A. Garro	
12 May 1912; 24 November 1912	Amador Izasa	
24 November 1912; 9 July 1922	Manuel Escobar (Unelected federal)	
9 July 1922; 20 November 1922	Amable Jones	
20 November 1922; 1 March 1922	Luis J. Colombo	
1 March 1922; 9 December 1922	Julio Bello	
9 December 1922; 17 December 1922	Marcial Izasa	
17 December 1922; 18 de January 1922	Manuel Carlés	
18 de January 1922; 12 May 1922	Aquiles Castro	
12 May 1922; 8 August 1922	Federico Cantoni	
8 August 1922; 6 December 1922	Eduardo Broquen (Unelected federal)	
6 December 1922; 23 December 1922	Aldo Cantoni	
23 December 1922; 6 September 1932	Modestino Pizarro (Unelected federal)	

== Governors from 1930 to 1958 ==
Term	Governor	Portrait
6 September 1932; 8 September 1932	Domingo Cuello (provisional)	
9 September 1932; 21 September 1932	José Ruda Vega (Military)	
22 September 1932; 12 March 1932	Marco Aurelio Avellaneda (provisional)	
13 March 1932; 4 August 1932	Celso Rojas	
2 August 1932; 17 February 1932	Ignacio Medina	
18 February 1932; 5 May 1932	Sigifredo Bazán Smith (provisional)	
12 May 1932; 22 February 1932	Federico Cantoni	
23 February 1932; 22 August 1932	Juan Jones (Military)	
23 August 1932; 21 August 1932	Ismael Galíndez	
22 August 1932; 8 September 1932	Juan Maurín (provisional)	
8 April 1932; 8 October 1932	Enrique Fliess (Unelected)	
9 October 1932; 27 May 1932	N. Costa Méndez (Unelected)	
28 May 1932; 21 September 1942	Evaristo Virasoro (Unelected)	
21 September 1942; 5 November 1942	Julio Raffo de la Reta (Unelected)	
6 November 1942; 14 January 1942	Epifanio Olmedo (provisional)	
15 January 1942; 27 June 1942	Pedro Valenzuela	
28 June 1942; 10 January 1942	Jorge Godoy (Unelected federal)	
11 January 1942; 30 January 1942	David Uriburu (Unelected federal)	
31 January 1942; 24 August 1942	Humberto Molina (Unelected federal)	
25 August 1942; 24 October 1942	Juan Berreta (Unelected federal)	
25 October 1942; 25 June 1942	Emilio Cipolletti (Unelected federal)	
26 June 1942; 12 February 1942	Juan Alvarado	
13 February 1942; 25 June 1952	Ruperto Godoy	
26 June 1952; 29 June 1952	Ruperto Godoy (governor)	
30 June 1952; 3 June 1952	Elías Amado	
4 June 1952; 20 September 1952	Rinaldo Viviani (governor)	
21 September 1952; 7 October 1952	Mario Fonseca (Unelected federal)	
8 October 1952; 30 January 1952	Juan Picca (Unelected)	
31 January 1952; 16 February 1952	Alberto Casas (Unelected federal)	
17 February 1952; 16 June 1952	Marino Carreras (Unelected federal)	
17 June 1952; 30 June 1952	Manuel Hermida (Unelected)	
1 July 1952; 30 April 1952	Edmundo Bernasconi (Unelected federal)	

== Governors from 1958 to 1983 ==
Term	Governor	Portrait
1 June 1952; 25 April 1962	Américo García	
26 April 1962; 24 June 1962	Fernando Méndez (Unelected federal)	
25 June 1962; 8 June 1962	Miguel Pedrozo (Unelected federal)	
9 June 1962; 11 August 1962	Pedro Avalía (de facto)	
12 August 1962; 27 October 1962	Leopoldo Bravo	
28 October 1962; 26 July 1962	A. Cordón Aguirre (de facto)	
27 July 1962; 24 August 1962	Edgardo Gómez (de facto)	
25 August 1962; 5 February 1972	José Augusto López (de facto)	
3 June 1972; 3 June 1972	Ruperto H. Godoy (de facto)	
4 June 1972; 24 June 1972	Carlos Centurión (de facto)	
25 June 1972; 23 February 1972	Eloy Camus	
24 February 1972; 27 April 1972	Carlos Tragant (de facto)	
28 April 1972; 13 December 1972	Alberto Lombardi (de facto)	
14 September 1972; 3 April 1982	Manuel Zamboni (de facto)	
4 April 1982; 14 January 1982	Daniel Rodriguez Castro (de facto)	
15 January 1982; 6 December 1982	Leopoldo Bravo (de facto)	
7 December 1982	Eduardo Pósleman (de facto)	

== Governors since 1983 ==
Term	Governor	Portrait
10 December 1982; 6 December 1982	Leopoldo Bravo	
7 December 1982; 9 December 1982	Jorge Ruiz Aguilar (on resignation of Leopoldo Bravo)	
10 December 1982; 9 December 1992	Carlos Gómez Centurión	
10 December 1992; 17 December 1992	Jorge Escobar	
18 December 1992; 28 December 1992	Juan Rojas (por destitución de Jorge Escobar)	
29 December 1992; 9 December 1992	Jorge Escobar	
10 December 1992; 9 December 1992	Jorge Escobar (governor)	
10 December 1992; 22 August 2002	Alfredo Avelín	
23 August 2002; 9 December 2002	Wbaldino Acosta	
10 December 2002; 9 December 2002	José Luis Gioja	
10 December 2002; 9 December 2012	José Luis Gioja	
10 December 2012 en cargo	José Luis Gioja	

== Sources ==
- Gobiernos provinciales desde 1930 hasta 1958 Fundacion Bataller
- Gobiernos provinciales desde 1958 a 1983, Fundacion Bataller
- Gobiernos provinciales desde 1983, Fundación Bataller
