= José Santos Ramírez =

Argentine general

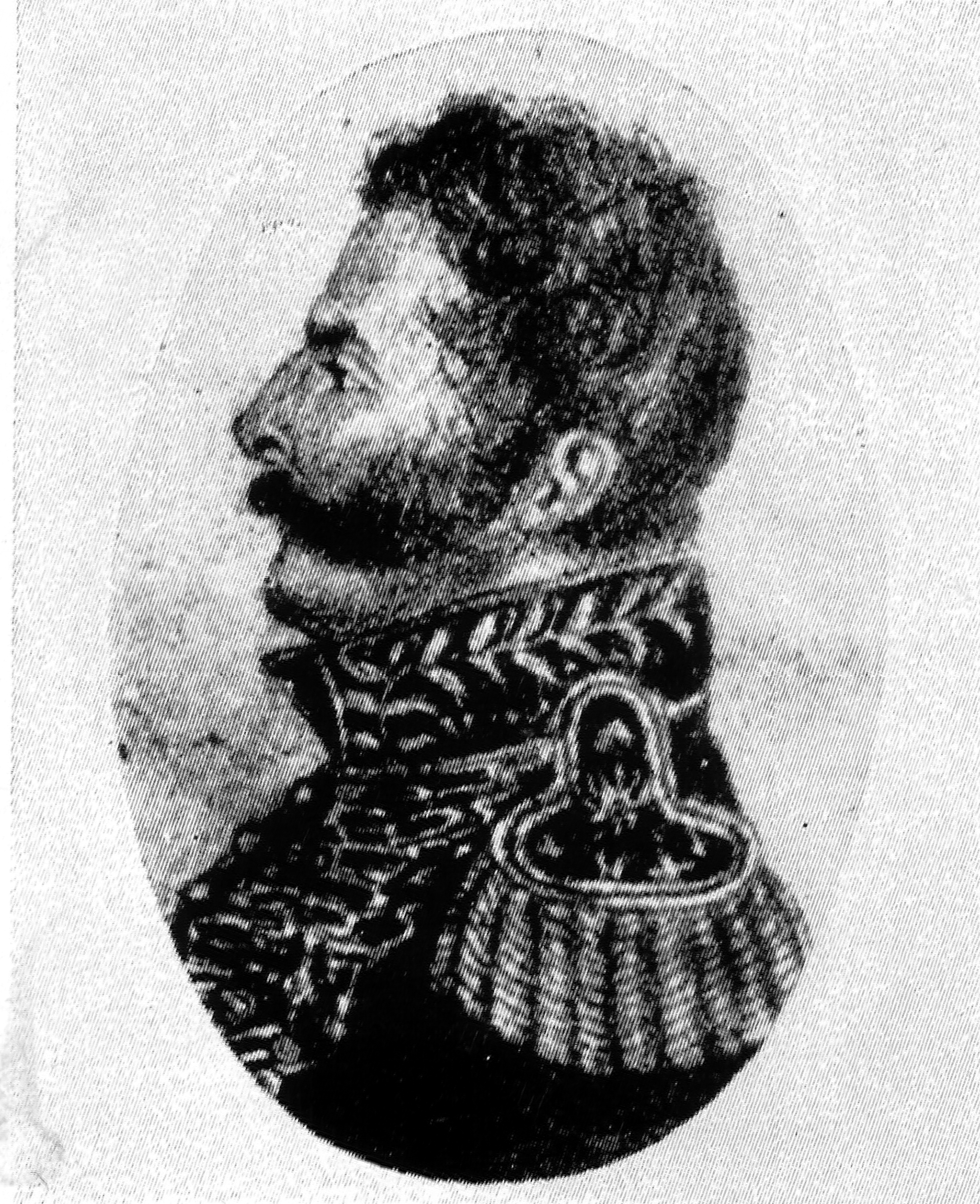
- Born: c. 1790; San Luis, Argentina
- Died: 1851; Mendoza, Argentina
- Military career
- Allegiance: Federalist
- Conflicts: Argentine Civil Wars

José Santos Ramírez (c. 1790 – 1851) was an Argentine soldier for a long time in the militia of Mendoza Province, and was involved on the Federalist side in several of the Argentine Civil Wars.

== Early years ==
José Santos Ramírez was born in San Luis, Argentina around 1790. He settled at a young age in the city of Mendoza. In 1812 he was appointed secretary to the governor of Mendoza, Colonel José Bolaños, who influenced him to join the provincial militia. He served for many years in the forces guarding the southern border of the province.

In 1829, with the rank of lieutenant colonel, Ramírez joined the Federalist army under Colonel José Félix Aldao, campaigned against the Unitarian General José María Paz and fought in the Battle of La Tablada. Returning from that engagement he fought in the Battle of Pilar. He saved the life of Domingo Faustino Sarmiento, whom he disguised as a slave when Aldao sent for the prisoners of that battle to execute them. He made a second campaign to Córdoba Province, and after the defeat in the Battle of Oncativo fled to Buenos Aires with Facundo Quiroga. He was second in command to Quiroga in his quick campaign in the south of Córdoba and into Cuyo, and fought in battles at Río Cuarto, Río Quinto and Rodeo de Chacón.

== Mendoza military leader ==
Ramírez was appointed commander of the southern border of Mendoza, based in San Rafael, and the same year was badly injured in a fight against the Indians, just before there invasion caused the death of General and former governor José Albino Gutiérrez. He was a member of the provincial legislature during the time of the Federalist Governor Pedro Molina y Sotomayor, and supported the Federalist party. In mid-1835 he was president of the military tribunals that tried the leaders of the conspiracy directed from San Juan by Domingo de Oro. His court passed a sentence of death on Colonels Lorenzo Barcala and José Ignacio Correa de Saá.

Under Aldao's command, Ramírez participated in the campaigns of 1840 and 1841 against the Northern Coalition in La Rioja, Catamarca and San Juan. While Aldao was facing Mariano Acha in the Battle of Angaco, he was in command of the Mendoza Province forces. He supported Nazario Benavídez in the Battle of La Chacarilla, where General Mariano Acha was captured and San Juan was recovered, but had to return to Mendoza when it was decided to abandon San Juan to the Unitarian army of Gregorio Aráoz de Lamadrid. He joined forces with General Ángel Pacheco, and led one of the wings of the federal cavalry in the Battle of Rodeo del Medio.

During the following years Ramírez was the commander of the Mendoza border. When Aldao died, the army commander Pedro Segura was elected governor and appointed Ramírez to command of the provincial army. He was considered the best candidate to be the next Governor.

== Later years ==
In March 1847, the Buenos Aires ambassador in Chile, Bernardo de Irigoyen, organized a revolution against Segura, and Ramírez confronted him with some success. But Segura delegated control to the president of the legislature, Alejo Mallea, who the next day demanded his resignation and assumed the governorship. The dictator Juan Manuel de Rosas congratulated the new government for ending "submission to the Unitarians" that Segura's government would have yielded, and publicly supported the coup. With this support, Mallea shook off his last constraints. On grounds of economy, Mallea eliminated the post of commander of arms of the province and dismissed Ramirez. José Santos Ramírez dies in Mendoza in March 1851.
