= Santiago Albarracín =

Argentine soldier (1800–1869)

José Santiago Albarracín
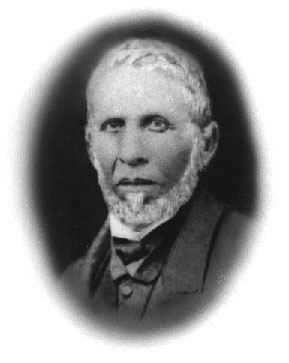
- Born: July 23, 1800; San Juan
- Died: April 20, 1869 (aged 68); Córdoba
- Military career
- Allegiance: Argentina, Unitarian Party
- Rank: Colonel
- Conflicts: Ituzaingó, Oncativo, La Ciudadela and Rinconada del Pocito

José Santiago Albarracín 1 (23 July 1800 – 20 April 1869) was an Argentine soldier who fought on the Unitarian side in many engagements in the Argentine Civil Wars, especially in the struggles against Chacho Peñaloza.

== Early years ==
Santiago Albarracín was born in San Juan, Argentina on 23 July 1800. (Note: He was baptized as "José Santiago" on 25 July 1800, from the parish register of the San Juan cathedral.) He was the son of Lucas Anselmo Albarracín Irrazábal and Aniceta Castro Marquezano. At a very young age he joined the Army of the Andes, along with his older brother, Lieutenant Pedro Pascacio Albarracín, but he was not involved in the campaign in Chile. He had his baptism of fire in the war against José Miguel Carrera in 1821.

Albarracín joined the division of José María Pérez de Urdininea, with which he went to Salta Province and then to Upper Peru (Bolivia) in 1825. For a time he served in a Bolivian regiment, returning later that year to Salta. Under the command of José María Paz he participated in the campaign against Brazil and fought in the Battle of Ituzaingó, in which he came close to dying in the destruction of the larger part of Paz's regiment. He returned to Buenos Aires in 1828, and fought against the Indians in the Laguna de los Huesos.

== Civil wars ==
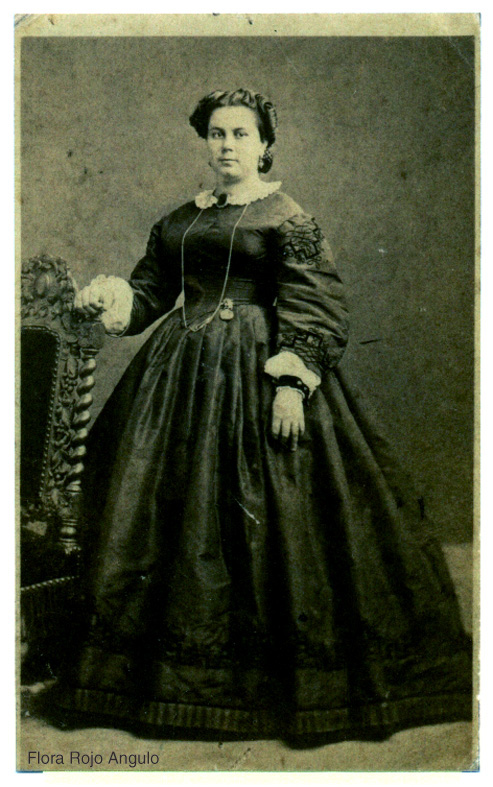
Flora Rojo y Angulo, esposa del coronel Santiago Albarracín.

Albarracín was ordered by Paz to Córdoba Province, where he fought on the Unitarian side in the battles of San Roque, La Tablada and Oncativo. In this last battle he was a Colonel and commanded a regiment of Cuirassiers that Paz had formed.

Albarracín invaded San Juan Province and deposed the Governor Juan Aguilar. He went on to Mendoza Province, where he defeated the Federalist forces that remained after Governor Juan Rege Corvalán fled, fighting two small engagements in La Estacada and beside the Río Tunuyán. After Facundo Quiroga invaded Cuyo, he came under the orders of General Gregorio Aráoz de Lamadrid in Tucumán Province, and participated in the Battle of La Ciudadela, where the Unitarian League of the Interion was finally defeated. He emigrated to Bolivia, and then to Peru. He returned to San Juan in 1825 and accompanied the governor Martin Yanzón in his absurd invasion of La Rioja Province, where they were defeated. He fled to Chile when La Rioja counterattacked, and remained there for many years.

On 27 November 1835 Albarracín married doña Flora Rojo, vice president of the Charitable Society of San Juan, daughter of José Rudecindo Rojo and Jacinta Angulo. They had two children, Jacinta in 1840, and Ignacio Lucas in 1850. (Note: Ignacio Lucas Albarracín became a lawyer and was well known as President of the Society for the Protection of Animals.) In 1845 he traveled to Montevideo, from where he moved to Corrientes Province to join the army of General Paz. He participated in Paz's abortive revolution against Governor Joaquín Madariaga and went into exile in Paraguay and Brazil with General Paz. He traveled through Chile, California, Mexico and the United States.

== Return to San Juan ==
Albarracín returned to Buenos Aires in 1852, shortly after the Battle of Caseros, and went to San Juan, where he organized a revolt against the caudillo Nazario Benavídez in that year. He managed to control the city a while, but then was beaten and arrested. He spent a long time in exile in Chile and Buenos Aires, returning to his province after Benavídez was removed from power.

Albarracín supported the revolution against José Antonio Virasoro, and Governor Antonino Aberastain appointed him commander of the provincial army. He was defeated in the Battle of Rinconada del Pocito, where his command was handicapped by the authority of Aberastain. He was arrested by the victor, Juan Saá, and remained imprisoned for several months.

Albarracín was released and given command of the provincial army in January 1862 when the province was invaded by troops from Buenos Aires, led by Domingo Faustino Sarmiento (his second cousin), who was elected governor. Under Sarmiento's orders, Albarracín fought in a clash with Ángel Vicente Peñaloza, and with the "lagunero" chief Santos Guayama.

In 1865 Albarracín offered his services for the war in Paraguay, but was rejected because of his age. He died in Córdoba on 20 April 1869.
