= José Félix Aldao =

Argentine Dominican friar and soldier (1785–1845)

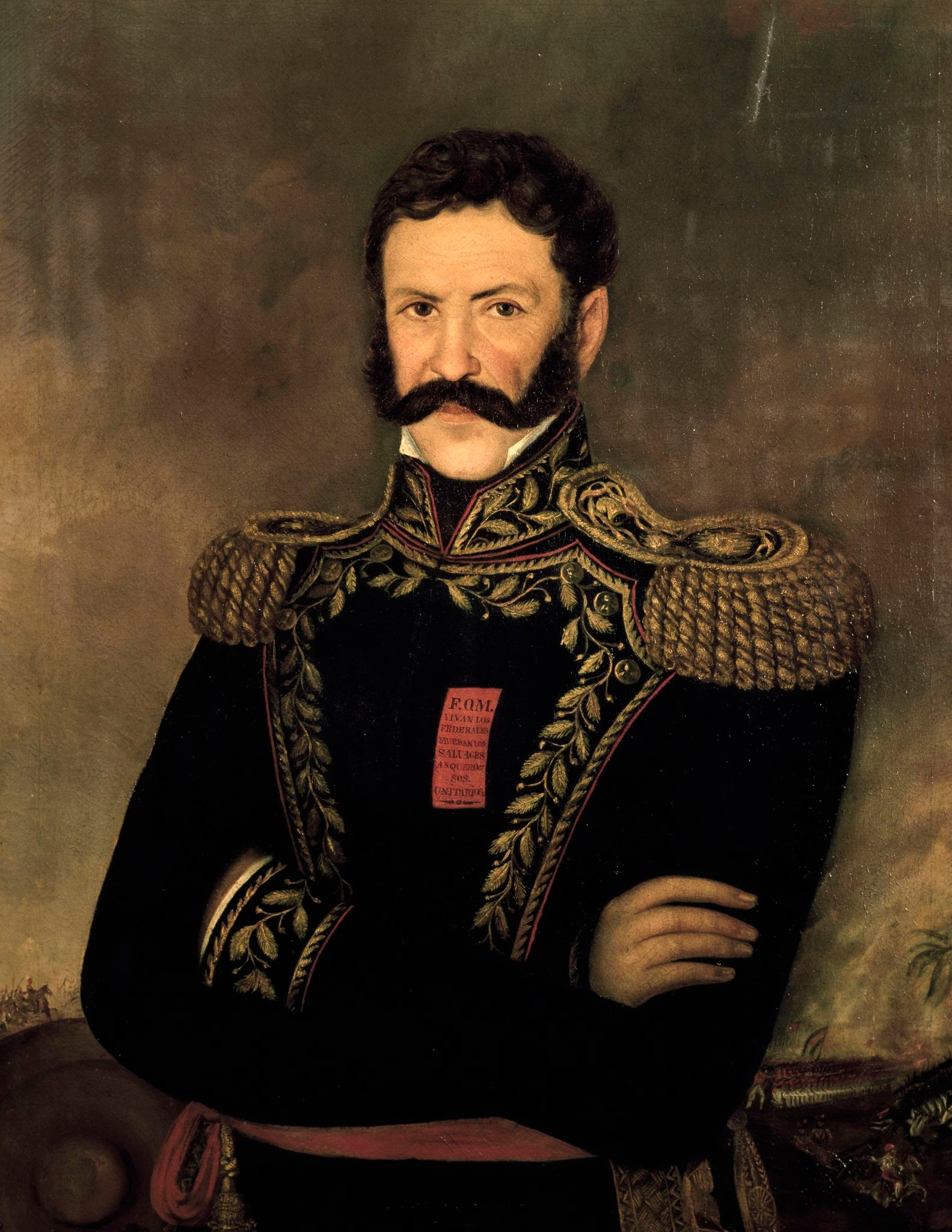
- Portrait by Fernando García del Molino

Governor of Mendoza
- In office 24 November 1841 – 19 January 1845
- Preceded by: Gregorio Aráoz de La Madrid
- Succeeded by: Celedonio de la Cuesta

Personal details
- Born: 11 October 1785 Mendoza, Argentina
- Died: 19 January 1845 (aged 59) Mendoza, Argentina
- Party: Federalist

José Félix Esquivel y Aldao (11 October 1785 - 19 January 1845) was an Argentine Dominican friar and soldier who became a general and then the undisputed Federalist caudillo of Mendoza Province. His ability as a warrior and his brutality became legendary. The largely fictionalized biography that Domingo Faustino Sarmiento wrote fed his legend. An effective ruler, he did much for his province, but was also one of the cruelest federalist leaders.

== From friar to colonel ==
José Félix Esquivel y Aldao was born in Mendoza, Argentina on October 11, 1785, the son of an army captain from what is now Santa Fe Province. His brothers José and Francisco were both soldiers who reached the rank of Colonel. He was educated in a Dominican college and soon entered the order. He was ordained a priest in 1806, and gained a doctorate in Santiago de Chile.

Upon returning to Mendoza, Aldao joined the Army of the Andes along with his brothers to campaign in Chile as chaplain of a regiment. In the Battle of Guardia Vieja he suddenly took up arms and fought beside the soldiers. Due to this, on the advice of general Juan Gregorio de las Heras to general José de San Martín, he joined the army as a lieutenant of the Mounted Grenadiers Regiment. His strength, size and energy made him more suitable for an army uniform than for a cassock. He fought throughout the campaign in Chile in Chacabuco, Cancha Rayada and Maipú.

In the Peruvian campaign Aldao was chosen to direct guerrilla operations in the Sierra. He roused the indigenous people to withhold resources from the royalists, to support the patriot army and to undertake minor operations, with hundreds of small battles. The royalists resorted to terror in response, and Aldao also showed great cruelty. During that war he was promoted to lieutenant colonel.

Aldao returned to the province of Mendoza in 1824 and dedicated himself to wine production. He would gradually become addicted to drink. In July 1825, a revolution led by Catholic priests deposed the San Juan governor Salvador María del Carril, who was carrying out a religious reform modeled on that of Bernardino Rivadavia. Del Carril fled to Mendoza for help, which was supplied as a small army under colonel José Aldao and his brothers Francisco and José Felix. They easily defeated the rebels, returning one of the most notable civilian Unitarian leaders to power.

== The Civil War ==
Aldao joined the provincial army as commander of the southern border, with bases in San Carlos and San Rafael. He gaining great prestige among the soldiers, the poor peasants and landowners. He achieved a major success against pehuenche tribes who inhabit the south of the province of Mendoza in October 1828.

In 1829 civil war broke out, beginning in Buenos Aires and Córdoba provinces, where the Unitarian general José María Paz overthrew the Federalist Juan Bautista Bustos. The caudillo of La Rioja, Juan Facundo Quiroga, sought help to restore Bustos, and the Governor of Mendoza sent an army under the "friar" Aldao. They were defeated in the Battle of La Tablada, in which the Mendoza leader was wounded, while in San Luis he heard the news that the Unitarians led by Juan Agustín Moyano had overthrown the governor and arrested his brothers.

He quickly returned to Mendoza, where he signed a peace treaty with the governor, general Rudecindo Alvarado. But Moyano refused to accept the treaty and faced Aldao in the Battle of Pilar on 22 September 1829. At the start of the battle, the Unitarian officers executed Francisco Aldao, sent by the general to make peace. José Félix Aldao won the battle. After learning of the death of his brother, he ordered most of the captured officers shot. Among them died Francisco Narciso de Laprida, who had been president of the Congress of Tucumán on the day that Argentina declared its independence in 1816. Moyano also was shot.

After the victory, Aldao assumed full military and political power in his province and gave himself the rank of general. He used that power in a very violent form, including forced contributions, flogging and death sentences to the Unitarians. According to Sarmiento, he went as far as to castrate his adversaries. He organized a new army, accompanying Quiroga in their war against the Córdoba Unitarians. They were defeated by Paz in the Battle of Oncativo.

Aldao was taken prisoner and taken to Córdoba. Several Unitarian leaders asked Paz for his death, but Paz kept him in prison while invading the provinces that retained federal governments, including Mendoza. There, Governor Corvalán and his brother Jose were killed by the Indians among whom had sought refuge. After the capture of Paz, Lamadrid took him in his retreat to Tucumán, and then deported him to Tarija in Bolivia, shortly before his defeat at the Battle of La Ciudadela.

== Desert campaign ==
In late 1832 Aldao returned to Mendoza, where he was given the post of commanding general of the province. He campaigned against native nations of the south - pehuenches and ranqueles - and in 1833 made another campaign, combined with the Desert Campaign (1833–34) that Juan Manuel de Rosas, the former governor of Buenos Aires had arranged. Among the leaders who accompanied Aldao were two future governors of San Juan, Martín Yanzón and Nazario Benavídez. This column gained a partial victory over the Ranquel chief Yanquetruz in fierce fighting on 31 March and 1 April 1833 at Arroyo del Rosario, in today's La Pampa Province. The Argentines prevailed but suffered considerable losses in the aftermath, when an outpost was overrun and almost all its occupants killed. The column reached the Colorado River and fixed that river as the southern boundary of the province. Their retreat was disastrous, with the troops stalked by thirst and hunger. Still, the south of the province was pacified and some Chilean farmers settled there who wintered their cattle in the valleys of the cordillera of the Andes.

Aldao became the Federalist leader in the west of the country and imposed his authority over the governments of the neighboring provinces of San Juan and San Luis. After the death of Quiroga, Aldao adopted a posture of obsequiousness toward Rosas. By that time he was starting to show symptoms of madness, perhaps caused by syphilis or by a tumor on his forehead.

== Second civil war ==
In 1839 a new civil war began, but it did not affect Mendoza until Juan Lavalle invaded from La Rioja after his defeat in the Battle of Quebracho Herrado. In response to a short lived revolution, he had himself elected Governor of the Province of Mendoza in early 1841 and invaded La Rioja with 2,700 men. Lavalle evaded him, but Colonel José María Flores, Aldao's second in command, defeated Mariano Acha in northern La Rioja. Aldao defeated La Rioja Governor Tomás Brizuela, who was killed by one of his own officers. Lamadrid attacked southward, sending a vanguard of 600 men under Mariano Acha, who took the city of San Juan.

Aldao quickly joined Nazario Benavídez and returned to San Juan, but Acha was waiting on the edge of the desert and totally defeated him in the Battle of Angaco, the bloodiest battle of the civil wars. Aldao returned to Mendoza while Benavídez recovered San Juan in the Battle of La Chacarilla. Acha was taken prisoner and sent to Aldao, who avenged his defeat: he had him shot and his head cut off, placing it on top of a pole for all to see. A few weeks later, Lamadrid took Mendoza, but an army led by Ángel Pacheco, in which Aldao participated only as head of a party of cavalry, defeated him in the Battle of Rodeo del Medio. The persecution that followed the battle, led by Aldao, caused hundreds of deaths among the defeated. This ended the civil war.

== Final years ==
The remainder of Aldao's government was particularly despotic. He declared "insane" all the Unitarians iliving in Mendoza in order to legally confiscate their property. In contrast, his administration promoted the development of the province, particularly in the south where he sponsored irrigation and the establishment of settlements in the desert. He suffered a terrible agony during his last year and a half of life. A small tumor formed in front of one eye, steadily growing despite efforts to excise or cauterize it. The medicine of that time had no way of dealing with cancer. Aldao delegated power to his minister Dr. Celedonio de la Cuesta in January 1845 and died a few days later, on 19 January . He was buried, at his request, with his Dominican friar's habit and also the general's uniform, one above the other.
