= Saturnino Laspiur =

Saturnino Laspiur may refer to:

- Saturnino María Laspiur, (1829 - 1885), an Argentine lawyer and politician who served as Minister of the Interior
- Saturnino Manuel de Laspiur, a Minister for San Juan, Argentina Governor Nazario Benavidez
