= Nazario Benavídez =

Argentine soldier (1802–1858)

José Nazario Benavídez
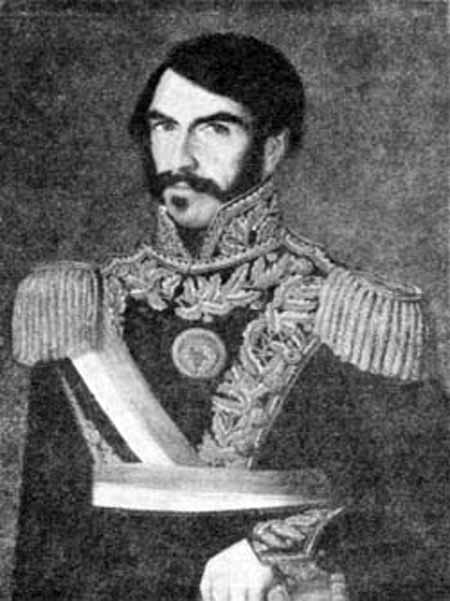
- Oil portrait of Nazario Benavidez painted by Franklin Rawson, 1843

Governor of San Juan Province, Argentina
- In office 26 February 1836 – 13 August 1841
- Preceded by: José Luciano Fernández
- Succeeded by: Mariano Acha

Governor of San Juan Province, Argentina
- In office 8 October 1841 – 29 May 1852
- Preceded by: José Manuel Quiroga Sarmiento
- Succeeded by: Zacarías Yanzi

Governor of San Juan Province, Argentina
- In office 8 August 1852 – 4 January 1855
- Preceded by: Zacarías Yanzi
- Succeeded by: Francisco Díaz

Governor of San Juan Province, Argentina
- In office 18 March 1857 – April 1857
- Preceded by: Francisco Díaz
- Succeeded by: Nicanor Molinas

Personal details
- Born: 27 July 1802 San Juan, Vicetroyalty of the Rio de la Plata
- Died: 23 October 1858 (aged 53) San Juan, Argentina

José Nazario Benavídez (27 July 1802 – 23 October 1858) was an Argentine soldier who rose to the rank of Brigadier General and played a leading role in the Argentine Civil Wars. He was Governor of San Juan Province, Argentina, for almost twenty years in the mid-nineteenth century. His lengthy political career during a period of great turbulence was due to the great respect in which he was held by enemies as well as friends. After leaving office he was imprisoned and then murdered by his guards.

== Background ==
San Juan de la Frontera was founded on 13 June 1562 by the Spanish conquistador Juan Jufré. It is located in the fertile but earthquake-prone San Juan valley in the mountainous Cuyo region of the west of what is now Argentina, and is headquarters of San Juan Province. The Andes rise in the west of the province, forming the border with Chile. To the south is Mendoza Province and San Luis Province, and to the east and north is La Rioja Province. When Benavídez was born in 1802, San Juan was a sleepy provincial town in the Viceroyalty of the Río de la Plata, part of the Spanish Empire. San Juan was mainly known for its aguardiente, or strong liquor.

In the May Revolution of 1810 the leaders in Buenos Aires, the main city of the viceroyalty, declared independence of the United Provinces of the Río de la Plata from the Bonaparte dynasty of Spain. On 19 July 1816, when Benavídez was fourteen, full independence from Spain was declared at the Congress of Tucumán. This was followed by a long series of civil wars in which caudillos, or military strongmen emerged in control of the provinces, fighting for a liberal and centralized Unitarian country or a more conservative and decentralized Federalist organization for the new republic. These struggles continued throughout Benavídez's life, and he was to be an important player.

== Early years ==
José Nazario Benavídez was born on 27 July 1802, son of Pedro Benavídez and Juana Paulina Balmaseda, in the city of San Juan. His father was of Chilean origin while his mother was from San Juan. Both were Criollos, of Spanish ancestry, but they were not wealthy. Nazario learned to read and write, but had no higher education. He worked in the fields and helped care for the animals. At the age of seventeen Nazario began working as a carrier, taking loads of goods by mule train and traveling widely in the other provinces. Nazario Benavídez later obtained a job managing an aguardiente distillery. In October 1821 his elder brother Juan Alberto Benavídez was executed for having taken part in an army mutiny.

== Soldier ==
In 1826 Benavídez was among fifty men from San Juan that Facundo Quiroga led in his successful campaign against Gregorio Aráoz de Lamadrid. He was a muleteer in the army, which included several thousand recruits from Cuyo and Córdoba. He took easily to army life, and rose steadily in rank, proving to be a natural leader. Benavídez fought in the Battle of Rincón de Valladares on 6 July 1827 and was praised by Quiroga. On 1 July 1829 he was appointed First Lieutenant.

In November 1829 Benavídez was in the vanguard of the army led by General José Benito Villafañe. In February 1830 Villafañe, who was in Córdoba Province with 1,400 men and a field artillery battery, failed to join his forces with Quiroga. As a result, Quiroga was defeated by Unitarian general José María Paz, losing 200 men and his baggage train. Villafañe signed an armistice with Paz on 5 March 1830. While some of his troops accepted the pact, others under Benavídez split away and marched to San Juan, where he joined an unsuccessful revolt against the Unitarian General Nicolás Vega. He was taken prisoner on 18 May 1830, but escaped on 3 November 1830 along with other Federalist leaders during an uprising in the city and fled to Chile. From there he organized montoneras, irregular forces that operated from the Sierra del Tontal to the Estancia Maradona, near to San Juan. The tide started to turn in favor of the Federals, with Quiroga winning a victory over José Videla Castillo at the Battle of Rodeo de Chacón on 28 March 1831. On 8 April 1831, Captain Benavides entered the city of San Juan at the head of forty-one soldiers.

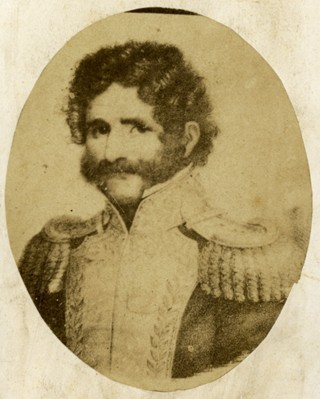
Facundo Quiroga, "El tigre de los llanos", Benavídez's commander and a witness at his wedding

In 1831 Benavídez fought as a lieutenant colonel under Quiroga as part of the vanguard in the campaign in Tucumán and Salta. With Commander Julián Cuenca, on 23 September 1831 he defeated the Unitarian Colonel Alejandro Herrero in Capayán. Four days later he defeated Sergeant Major Juan José Guesi in Miraflores, taking the latter prisoner on 30 September 1831. He fought in the Battle of La Ciudadela on 4 November 1831 under the command of General Quiroga and was mentioned in dispatches for his courage and skill. By January 1832 Facundo Quiroga had concluded that the war was over, and ordered the troops to return to their provinces.

In 1833 Benavídez fought with Colonel Martín Yanzón on the staff of the second Auxiliary regiment of the Andes in the desert campaign, gaining victory over the local Mapuche chief Yanquetruz. Benavídez fought in this campaign under the command of General José Félix Aldao, participating in fierce fighting on 31 March and 1 April 1833 in which the Spanish gained victory but suffered considerable losses. On 7 September 1833 Quiroga ordered the army to return, and it reached Mendoza in mid-October.

== Entry into politics ==
Benavídez returned to San Juan, where he married Telésfora Borrego y Cano on 25 October 1833. General Quiroga was a witness at the wedding. His wife was from a wealthy family. They were to have many children over the years that followed, some of whom died young as was common at that time. Segundo de los Reyes was the first, followed by Telésfora, Pedro Pascasio, Nazario del Carmen, Tomás Numa, the twins Juana Ángela and Juan Rómiulo, Paulina Laurentina, Paulina de Jesús, Pedro Pascasio and in 1857 the twins Eduardo Javel and Gerardo Juval.

In February 1835 Quiroga was assassinated, and the next month Juan Manuel de Rosas was elected Governor of Buenos Aires, with extraordinary powers. There were rumors that Rosas had been involved in Quiroga's death. In 1835 Benavídez was in charge of the military while Colonel Martín Yanzón was governor of San Juan Province. He held this post until August 1835. That month, Benavídez organized a revolt against the governor. It did not succeed and he had to flee to Buenos Aires, where Rosas welcomed him. On 22 September 1835 Yanzón declared him an outlaw. Yanzón invaded La Rioja Province, and on 5 January 1836 was defeated at Pango, near to the city of La Rioja by forces commanded by General Tomás Brizuela. On 9 January 1836 Yanzón was replaced by José Luciano Fernández as acting governor. On 25 January 1836 Fernández repealed the decree outlawing Benavídez.

The San Juan House of Representatives named Benavídez acting governor on 26 February 1836, and on 8 May 1836 he was elected governor. He was to remain in this office with short interruptions for the next twenty years. On 8 May 1836 Benavídez was given the rank of brigadier general. His ministers during the years until January 11, 1854, in which he ruled the province with only short interruptions due to civil strife were, in turn, Amán Rawson, Timoteo Maradona, Saturnino Manuel de Laspiur, Dr. Saturnino de la Presilla and Colonel Juan Antonio Durán.

== Civil war of 1840–41 ==
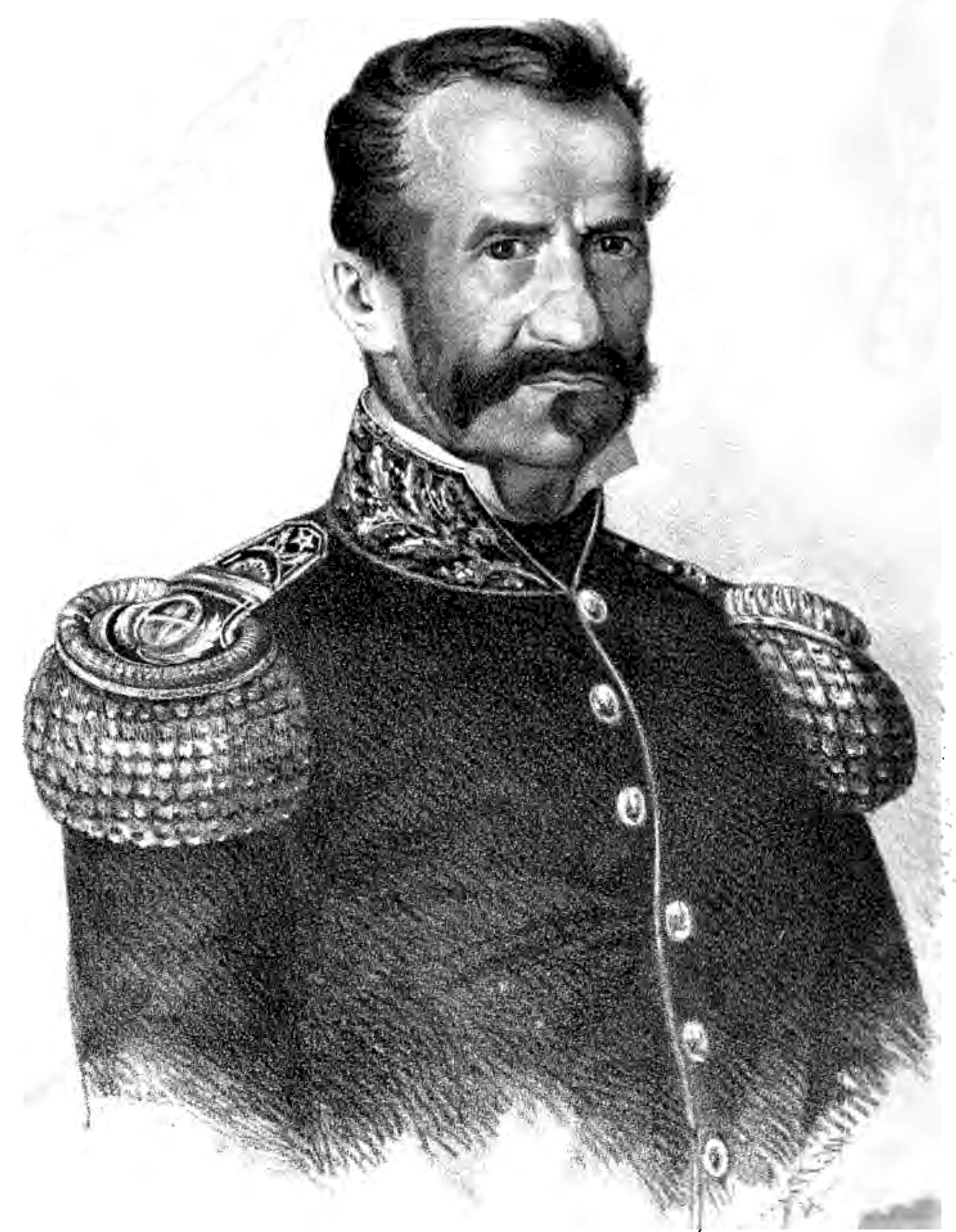
Gregorio Aráoz de Lamadrid, a leader of the Unitarian forces

When the provinces of the interior rebelled in 1840, Benavídez was made second commander of the Federal forces. On 20 March 1841 Benavídez's troops surprised and dispersed Colonel Mariano Acha's force of 400 troops at Machigasta. In April 1841 Benavídez delegated command to Colonel José María de Oyuela. When Gregorio Aráoz de Lamadrid attacked La Rioja, occupying the city on 22 July 1841, he sent Colonel Acha with the Unitarian vanguard towards San Juan. Acha broke through the troops sent against him by Oyuela and occupied the city of San Juan on 13 August 1841. Three days later a combined force of Federal troops from Cuyo under General José Félix Aldao supported by Benavídez clashed in an all-day struggle with Acha’s much smaller force in the Battle of Angaco. Despite being greatly outnumbered, Acha was victorious.

Benavídez retired from the field of battle. On the road near Cañada Honda he met Colonel José Santos Ramírez bringing 500 reinforcements to Aldao from Mendoza. This gave Benavídez a force of 800, and he decided to attack Acha again. On 19 August 1841 he found Acha at Chacarilla, to the south of the city of San Juan. He dispersed the cavalry, but Acha returned to the city with his infantry and established a strong position in the plaza and in the church tower from which he fought off the Federal forces of Benavídez for three days before surrendering.

Benavídez rejoined Aldao, and on 15 September re-assumed overall command. The next day, on the orders of Aldao, General Acha was executed. Benavídez had treated Acha with chivalry and had not authorized this act. Acha’s destruction weakened Lamadrid, who occupied the city of Mendoza while General Pacheco advanced against that city. On 24 September Lamadrid engaged the Federal forces at the major Battle of Rodeo del Medio, in which his forces were routed, and he was forced to flee to Chile. Benavídez resumed the governorship of San Juan on 8 October 1841, but in December 1841 he delegated the position to Colonel Oyuela. The next year he took to the field again in a campaign against the montoneras raised by Colonel Ángel Vicente Peñaloza, defeating them decisively on 18 July 1842 at the Battle of Manantial de Tucumán. On 15 January 1843 he fought successfully at the Bañado de Ilisca and two days later again won engagements at Saquilán and Leoncito.

== Return to politics ==
In May 1843 Benavídez was again elected Governor of San Juan. In September 1844 he suppressed a violent attempt at revolution. In 1845 Domingo Faustino Sarmiento, later to be his enemy, wrote that San Juan was the only military power in the interior of the Republic. He said that Benavídez enjoyed huge prestige in all the Andean provinces, and dominated Mendoza and La Rioja. Benavídez supported his former opponent General Peñaloza when he returned to the country in 1845. He respected the division of powers in his government, and included men who did not belong to the Federal party including Saturnino Manuel de Laspiur. He encouraged education, production and trade in San Juan. On 4 December 1846 Benavídez ordered a survey of the province that would describe all the estates and farms, their extent and crops, and their use of irrigation. In January 1847 he issued a decree allowing the resumption of trade with Chile via the mountain route.

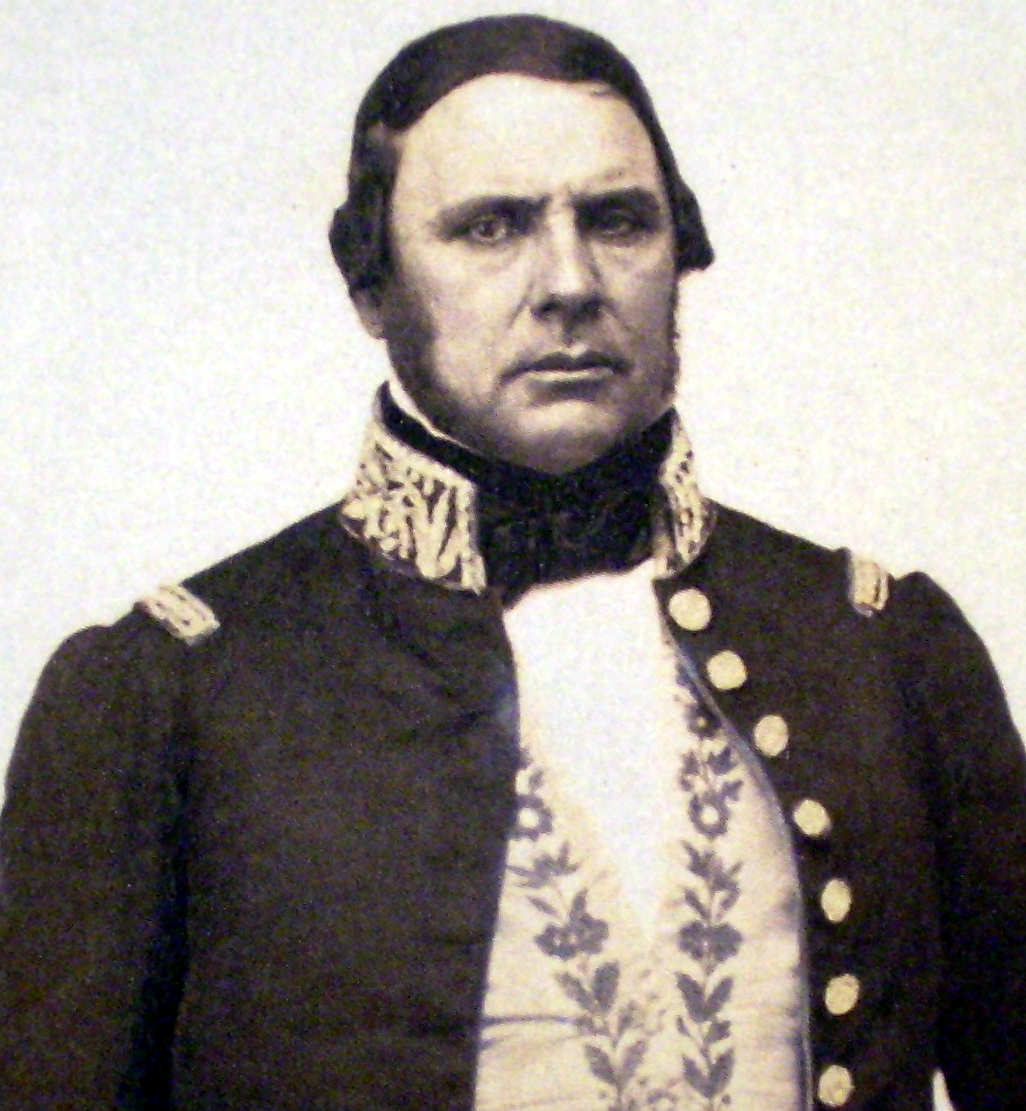
Justo José de Urquiza, whom Benavídez came to support

In March 1848 Benavídez delegated the government to his minister Saturnino de Laspiur while he was in Mendoza Province, where he commanded the forces of that province in a short campaign against the rebel commander of Fort San Rafael, Juan Antonio Rodríguez. Benavídez soon returned and resumed the government, and was re-elected in 1849. When General Justo José de Urquiza declared against the dictator Rosas in 1851, demanding implementation of a national constitution, Benavídez at first gave his support to Rosas and was designated military commander of the west. After the Battle of Caseros (3 February 1852), Benavídez adhered to Urquiza's cause and concurred with the San Nicolás Agreement on 31 May 1852. All the provinces signed this agreement except Buenos Aires, which thus seceded from the federation.

While Benavídez was absent from San Juan, his enemies in the government declared his office was vacant on 6 June 1852 and deposed him as commander in chief. Urquiza, now the provisional Director of the Argentine Confederation, reproved the San Juan government, and ordered Generals Pedro Pascual Segura and Pablo Lucero, governors of Mendoza and San Luis, to put all their available forces at the disposal of Benavídez. In face of this, the acting governor Zacarías Yanzi issued a decree on 9 August 1852 saying that Benavídez was governor, and on 13 August 1852 Benavídez returned to the city. On 13 November 1852 another rebellion led by Colonel Santiago Albarracín occupied the city for six days while Benavídez was absent. After both these rebellions, Benavídez took severe action against the rebels. The noted political figure Guillermo Rawson, who had denounced Benavidez, was imprisoned and shackled.

Benavídez delegated the government to Juan Luis Riveros between 29 August 1853 and 21 April 1854 for health reasons. On 30 October 1854 he again left the capital to organize the militias and national guards in the provinces that had been established under the new constitution. He delegated to his minister Duran during this period. On 13 December 1854 he resigned as governor, being succeeded on 11 January 1855 by Colonel Francisco Domingo Díaz. On 18 March 1857 governor Díaz was overthrown in a revolution. Benavídez assumed military control as commander in chief of the army of the west, and the next day assumed the position of interim governor. The next month a commission arrived from the national government chaired by Nicanor Molinas, who assumed the acting governorship.

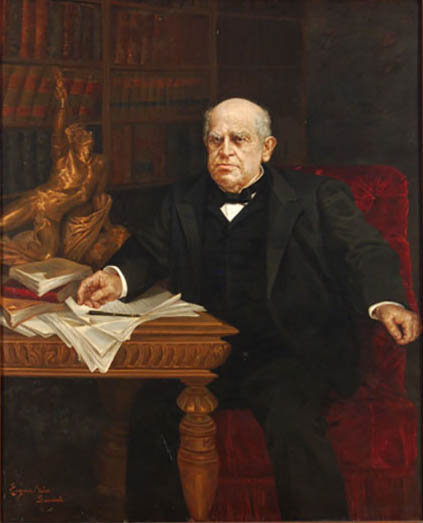
Domingo Faustino Sarmiento, a Liberal opponent who respected Benavídez

Benavídez left office for the last time on 29 April 1857. The old divisions between Unitarians and Federals had broken down, and in San Juan the split was now between supporters and opponents of Benavídez, who was seen as a threat to the constitutional government. On 6 September 1857 Manuel José Gómez Rufino was elected governor. Gómez was a former Unitarian who had participated in the May 1852 coup against Benavídez and who was supported by the Liberals. The Liberal minister Saturnino María Laspiur used his newspapers La Tribuna and El nacional to agitate for removal of the "tyrant" Benavídez.

== Death ==
On 19 September 1858 Benavídez was arrested on a charge of sedition. On the night of 22/23 October 1858 a group of his supporters stormed the council building where Benavídez had been confined. While they were trying to break in, three members of the guard went to the room where he was being held. Benavídez fought them despite the heavy iron fetters on his feet, and killed one man, but a sword was thrust through his body and he took two shots to the chest. He was dragged from the cell, half dead and almost naked, and thrown from the building to the balustrade of the square, where a group of officers finished him off with sword thrusts.

Sarmiento, who had been an enemy of Benavídez during his life, wrote of him in 1888 that he had ruled with moderation and no blood had been shed by his government. He had earlier written that Benavídez had a cool personality, and it was owing to him that San Juan had suffered less than other places. He had a good heart, was tolerant, was not disturbed by envy, was patient and tenacious.

The brutal assassination of Benavidez, attributed to Urquiza's opponents in Buenos Aires, was one of the factors that led to the Battle of Cepeda on 23 October 1859, followed by the Pact of San José de Flores in which Buenos Aires was brought back into the federation.

== Political views ==
Benavídez death was seen as an sacrifice by liberalism.
