= Juan José Guesi =

Argentine soldier

Juan José Guesi was a soldier who fought in the Argentine Civil Wars on the Unitarian side.

== Professional career ==
On 27 September 1831 at Miraflores, Catamarca, a Federalist force led by Nazario Benavídez and Julián Cuenca defeated the force commanded by Sergeant Major Guesi. Guesi had about a hundred men. In the engagement, 18 died and 22 were taken prisoner, including Guesi. In retaliation for the shooting of Captain Juan de Dios Melián (Note: Melián had been sent by General Rudecindo Alvarado to discuss a proposed armistice.) and his assistants that General Gregorio Aráoz de Lamadrid had ordered on 28 September 1831, Guesi was executed on the orders of Colonel Juan de Dios Vargas on 30 September 1831. Another source says he was killed in San Miguel de Tucumán on 5 November 1831, and that when he resisted he was bayoneted to death.
