= Tomás Brizuela =

Soldier

Governor of La Rioja Province, Argentina
- In office 3 February 1831 – 15 March 1831
- Preceded by: Domingo Eugenio Villafañe
- Succeeded by: Paulino Orihuela

Governor of La Rioja Province, Argentina
- In office 20 May 1837 – 1 May 1841
- Preceded by: Juan A. Carmona
- Succeeded by: José Manuel Figueroa

Personal details
- Born: c. 1800 La Rioja, Viceroyalty of the Rio de la Plata (now in Argentina)
- Died: 1841 Sañogasta

Tomás Brizuela (c. 1800 – 20 June 1841) was a soldier and caudillo in Argentina. He was a lieutenant of Facundo Quiroga in his home province of La Rioja, and governor of La Rioja between 1836 and 1841, Brizuela died fighting against the dictatorship of Juan Manuel de Rosas.

== Early career ==
Tomás Brizuela was born in the Province of La Rioja around 1800. He was known as the "Zarco" (Note: "Zarco" is a term used interchangeably by gauchos to refer to those with different colored eyes or light eyes) for his blue eyes. As a young man he joined the Federalist forces. He accompanied Quiroga in the Battle of El Tala against Gregorio Aráoz de Lamadrid, and as infantry leader in the Battle of Rincón de Valladares, where he earned promotion to Colonel. He later fought in the Federal defeat of the Battle of La Tablada. When the province was invaded by Lamadrid, after the Federal defeat in the Battle of Oncativo he was taken prisoner by Lieutenant Colonel Melián. Lamadrid ordered him shot, but Melián saved his life.

In late 1830 Brizuela joined the fight to recover La Rioja for his party, and occupied the provincial capital. On 3 February 1831 he was briefly appointed governor. Soon after the news came of the victory of Quiroga in the Battle of Rodeo de Chacon, which gave him control of Cuyo. Brizuela joined forces with Quiroga and was commander of the provincial army during the following years. On 15 January 1836 he repulsed the invasion of San Juan Governor Martín Yanzón and counterattacked, occupying the city of San Juan and forcing Yanzón to flee. On 20 May 1837 he was appointed governor of La Rioja by the provincial legislature.

== Later years ==
In early 1840, the Liberals and Unitarians of the northern provinces formed the Northern Coalition and invited Brizuela to join. He was named commander of the Coalition, but nobody accepted his orders. The Unitarian officers who arrived from Chile such as Colonel Juan Esteban Pedernera, sent to be his chief of staff, and those who come later with Lavalle, despised him for being an alcoholic and leader of irregular montoneras units. Taking his role seriously, he tried to convince the Santiago leader Juan Felipe Ibarra to join him, but Ibarra refused and remained true to Juan Manuel de Rosas.

After his defeat in the Battle of Quebracho Herrado, the Unitarian General Juan Lavalle retreated northward. La Rioja was invaded without difficulty by Nazario Benavídez and José Félix Aldao with 1,500 men, threatening Brizuela and Lavalle. Lavalle abandoned the province for Catamarca, pursued by Oribe, while Aldao advanced towards Brizuela. Still commanding 600 men, Brizuela retreated to the Famatina valley, in the west of the province. He reached Sañogasta, where he was defeated. During the battle, on 20 June 1841 he was shot in the back by one of his officers, and died before being taken to the presence of Aldao.
