= Ángel Vicente Peñaloza =

Argentine military officer and provincial leader (1798–1863)

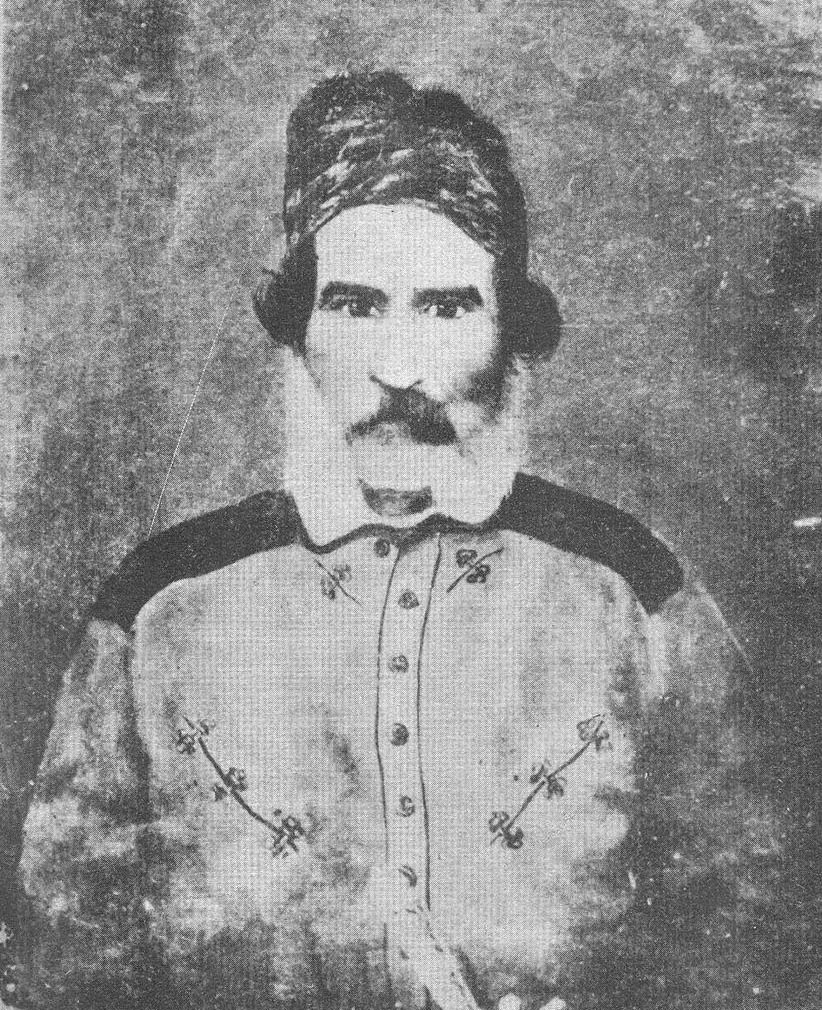
- Portrait of Peñaloza, c. 1863.
- Born: October 2, 1798; Sierra de los Llanos, La Rioja Province, Viceroyalty of the Rio de la Plata
- Died: November 12, 1863 (aged 65); Olta, La Rioja Province, Argentina

Ángel Vicente "Chacho" Peñaloza (October 2, 1798 – November 12, 1863) was a military officer and provincial leader prominent in both the history of La Rioja province and the Argentine civil wars that preceded national unity.

== Life and times ==
=== Early life and military experience ===
Peñaloza was born in Sierra de los Llanos, a rural community in the Argentine province of La Rioja. Raised in privileged circumstances, he was educated by a priest. The priest, an uncle of the young Peñaloza, nicknamed him Chacho (a diminutive form of muchacho, Spanish for "guy"). He enrolled in the provincial militia, and fought under the command of Captain Juan Facundo Quiroga, reaching the rank of captain by 1826.

Peñaloza fought in this capacity in the battles of Rincón de Valladares (1827), La Tablada (1829), and Oncativo (1830). Quiroga's defeats in the latter two, however, enabled the formation of the Unitarian League by José María Paz, against which the La Rioja forces were of little match.

=== Military leader of La Rioja ===
In 1831. Peñaloza fought in the Battle of La Ciudadela against Tucumán province governor Gregorio Aráoz de Lamadrid. Lamadrid was severely wounded and his army defeated, while Peñaloza's own wounds, as well as his role in the battle, earned him the rank of commanding Captain of the Militia. He returned to La Rioja, and helped to oust Lamadrid's proxy, Governor Domingo Villafañe. Following Quiroga's 1836 assassination, Peñaloza secured an alliance with San Juan Province Governor Martín Yanzón, and though their attempted invasion of La Rioja failed, the victor, Tomás Brizuela, pardoned Peñaloza upon his election as governor in May 1837. Peñaloza joined Brizuela, who was named commanding military officer in 1840 for the newly formed Northern Coalition. The group, an alliance of fellow Federalists opposed to the paramount Governor of Buenos Aires Province, Juan Manuel de Rosas, supporting Juan Lavalle's failed revolt against Rosas, as well as their former foe, Aráoz de La Madrid, in an ill-fated battle against a Rosas ally in Mendoza Province. Following these 1841 defeats, Peñaloza fled to Chile.

He returned in 1842 to join his erstwhile ally from San Juan, Martín Yanzón. They were ultimately routed by San Juan Governor Nazario Benavídez, however, and Peñaloza again fled to Chile. He returned in 1845, overthrew the Governor of La Rioja, formed an alliance with Benavídez, and installed Manuel Vicente Bustos as Governor of La Rioja in 1848.

Bustos named him commander of his home district, Los Llanos, and by 1854, Peñaloza had regained his rank as commander of the La Rioja militia. Rosas had, by then, been overthrown at the 1852 Battle of Caseros, and Peñaloza offered the new President of the Argentine Confederation, General Justo José de Urquiza, his support. Peñaloza became the effective ruler of La Rioja, becoming a caudillo, or strongman, in his province. He earned respect for his accessibility, diligence, and kindness. In 1860, Penaloza used his gauchos once again to remove Governor Manuel Vincente Bustos and appoint Federalist Ramon Angel as his replacement.

As a caudillo, Peñaloza amassed power through the client-patron relationship and personal interactions like card games, attending horse races, and participating in construction projects. Like most of his followers, Peñaloza was illiterate, dressed in local garb, and lived in a shaky hut made from adobe. Peñaloza's quality of life largely resembled those of his gaucho following, especially in comparison to unitarian leaders in the capital. This increased the trust followers had in Peñaloza to have similar interests and priorities. To maintain his authority, Penaolza had a majority of the population fill the ranks of his "secret police"; they kept him informed on all aspects of his enemies.

Victoria Romero, Peñaloza's wife, participated in strengthening the caudillo's following. While many women participated in federalist-unitarian debates, Romero was unusual in her engagement in caudillo-like behaviors. She danced, played cards, drank, and socialized with followers' wives. Followers described her as taking care of them, increasing their loyalty to her husband. In the 1840s, she marched with Peñaloza into battle, including at the Battle of Manantial de Tucumán, where tradition reports she was wounded saving his life.

=== Rebellion against the central government ===
The 1858 assassination of Nazario Benavídez, San Juan's Federalist governor, by Liberals allied to Buenos Aires centralists inflamed tensions between the Confederation and the State of Buenos Aires, and President Urquiza commissioned Peñaloza to seize control of San Juan, which the latter would administer on a receivership basis. The breakdown of the peace obtained at the Pact of San José de Flores in 1859 prompted Peñaloza to seek an alliance with Tucumán governor Celedonio Gutiérrez. The invasion of Bartolomé Mitre's Unitarian Party forces led to their retreat during 1861 and 1862, culminating in a siege on the city of San Luis by Peñaloza's decimated troops. Peñaloza was deceived in the subsequent Treaty of La Banderita, receiving dead troops in exchange for prisoners of war.

Resolute in his losing struggle, Peñaloza wrote to Mitre (by then President of Argentina) in March 1863, to explain that:

These governors-turned-executioners of the provinces banish and kill without trial respectable citizens whose only crime was to have belonged to the Federal Party. All men who have nothing more to lose than their existence, would sooner sacrifice themselves in battle.

Peñaloza won victories in La Rioja and entered the city of Córdoba on June 14, 1863. His refusal to fight within the city boundaries led to his defeat on June 28, at Pajas Blancas. During the subsequent retreat, he was routed again at Los Gigantes, San Juan Province, by Colonel Pablo Irrazábal.

Peñaloza retreated to La Rioja, and manage to depose a military junta installed during his absence. Confronted again by Irrazábal near Olta, he was defeated and on November 12, and cornered, he eventually surrendered to an Irrazábal subordinate, relinquishing a facón that remained as his only weapon. Irrazábal, however, killed Peñaloza on arrival with a tacuara spear, and his body was then riddled with gunfire. His severed head was displayed on a pike at Olta's main square, and his wife, Victoria Romero, was forced into servitude, sweeping the streets of San Juan in chains.

=== Legacy ===
Peñaloza represented barbarism to Domingo Sarmiento and a threat to national unity to Bartolomé Mitre. His supporters in the hinterland provinces, however, highlighted his role as a bulwark against what they saw as Buenos Aires hegemony over national affairs. One of his subordinates, Felipe Varela, led a peasants' uprising against Mitre's government in 1867, during the War of the Triple Alliance. The rebellion was decisively defeated at the Battle of Pozo de Vargas, in the outskirts of La Rioja, by the forces of Santiago del Estero´s governor, Antonino Taboada, on 10 April 1867.

Both celebrated and notorious in life, Peñaloza was commemorated by writer José Hernández, who wrote Vida del Chacho within weeks of Peñaloza's death, and by poet Olegario Víctor Andrade. His dagger was put on display at the La Rioja Historical Museum. The words carved on its handle told of his egalitarian cause and principles: "no one worth more than another, no one worth less than another"

In chapter six of Ariel de le Fuente's book Children of Facundo, Penaloza's legacy is remembered in oral culture through songs and stories. These stories emphasize that he appreciated and rewarded his followers. Some even painted him as a saint who gave to the poor. These stories made Penaloza more than a figure in history; they painted him as a hero who embodied the ideal of federalism.

== Bibliography ==
- Luna, Félix. Los caudillos. Buenos Aires: Editorial Peña Lillo, 1971.
- Historical Dictionary of Argentina. London: Scarecrow Press, 1978.
- De le Fuente, Ariel. "Children of Facundo". Durham, NC: Duke University Press
