= General Ramírez (disambiguation) =

General Ramírez is a village and municipality in Entre Ríos Province in north-eastern Argentina. General Ramírez may also refer to:

- Francisco Ramírez (governor) (1786–1821), Argentine general governing Entre Ríos during the Argentine War of Independence
- José Santos Ramírez (c. 1790–1851), Argentine general in the Argentine Civil Wars
- Juan Sánchez Ramírez (1762–1811), captain general of the Dominican Republic
- Pedro Pablo Ramírez (1884–1962), Argentine general who became president in a coup
- Victoriano Ramírez (1888–1929), Mexican Army general in the Cristero War
