= Battle of Rodeo del Medio =

- Part of the Argentine Civil Wars
Date	24 September 1841
Location	Rodeo del Medio, center of Mendoza Province, Argentina 32°58′0″S 68°41′0″W
Result	Federalist victory

Belligerents
Federalists	Unitarians

Commanders and leaders
Ángel Pacheco	Gregorio Aráoz de Lamadrid

Strength
Total: 2,000–3,000; Cavalry: 1,200– 1,500; Infantry: 1,600–1,800; Cannons: 10–13	Total: 1,150–1,600; Cavalry: 800–1,200; Infantry: 400; Cannons: 8–10

Casualties and losses
Dead: 18 wounded: 30	Dead & wounded: 400; Prisoners: 300

The Battle of Rodeo del Medio, fought in Mendoza Province, Argentina on 24 September 1841, took place between the Federalist army of Ángel Pacheco and the Unitarian army of Gregorio Aráoz de Lamadrid during the Argentine Civil Wars. The consequences of the Federalist victory would last for a decade.

== Background ==
In 1840 the Northern Coalition had formed an alliance of almost all the northern provinces against the governor of Buenos Aires Province, Juan Manuel de Rosas, and his allies. General Juan Lavalle had spent more than a year fighting Rosas in Entre Ríos and Corrientes, when he had invaded Buenos Aires Province. But he failed in the invasion, retreating to Córdoba Province, where he was defeated at the Battle of Quebracho Herrado.

Lavalle joined forces with Gregorio Aráoz de Lamadrid, and together they retreated to Tucumán Province. From there, Lamadrid marched towards the Cuyo provinces to open a new war front, thinking José Félix Aldao only had 800-1000 troops from Mendoza at the time, as Lavalle believed. Lavalle entrenched in Tucuman with 1,500 militiamen. Yet, at that time reinforcements under Manuel Oribe began arriving adding up to 9,000 troops, but only 6,000 ended up part of the final push as the rest remained defending the Cuyo region.

Lamadrid's vanguard led by Mariano Acha had 900 to 1,000 soldiers and two cannons. (Note: Others sources consider that Acha had only 300 infantry, 200 cavalry and artillery.) Acha faced the Federalist armies of José Félix Aldao and Nazario Benavídez, governors of the provinces of Mendoza and San Juan, in the Battle of Angaco, one of the bloodiest of the Argentine civil wars. After Acha had won, he occupied the city of San Juan, but two days later was defeated by Benavídez in the Battle of La Chacarilla, and was shot by order of Aldao. Lamadrid reoccupied San Juan with 1,500 troops, (Note: Other sources say Lamadrid had 600-1000 men with 8 guns) and from there went to Mendoza, entering the city on 3 September 1841, where he was elected governor.

== Development ==
Three weeks later general Ángel Pacheco came to Mendoza accompanied by Aldao, with 2,000 men, 1,500 horses and corresponding artillery. Lamadrid went out to meet him in Rodeo del Medio, near the city, on the morning of 24 September. The Federalists had 3,000 men and the Unitarians only 1,600. The armies were separated by a flooded area that could only be passed by a bridge. From the beginning, Lamadrid failed to prevent Pacheco from seizing the bridge. His left wing, led by Ángel Vicente Peñaloza, was prevented from moving by a counter-order. When he finally did move, he was quickly repelled by the infantry. The defeat of the Unitarians was evident from the start, and soon all were fleeing to the mountains.

It was a very bloody battle, with hundreds of deaths on each side, followed by a terrible persecution of the vanquished, led by the "monk" Aldao, causing many hundreds of additional deaths. Aldao ordered 1,000 men to follow up to Catamarca to the north, while the rest remained in La Rioja to prevent an attempt by Lavalle to advance to Cuyo.

== Aftermath ==
The defeated crossed the Andes, long before the thaw would allow a safe crossing, and more than a hundred men died. It is said that a few of the losers hid in a village near Mendoza, then called Coquimbito. The losers did not yet know, but five days before, General Lavalle had been defeated in the Battle of Famaillá in Tucumán, and would be dead within days from an accident in San Salvador de Jujuy. Pacheco ordered Aldao to pursue Lavalle north with 1,500 men, and subsequently Oribe provided the troops of Mariano Maza in support. Aldao's troops totaled over 2,700 soldiers with two howitzers directed by Maza, Nazario Benavídez, Pablo Lucero and Pablo Alemán.

These two battles were the end of the Northern Coalition, and guaranteed Rosas almost unchallenged rule over the country for another ten years, until the Battle of Caseros in 1852.
