= Battle of Rodeo de Chacón =

Battle of Rodeo del Chacón
- Part of the Argentine Civil Wars
Date	28 March 1831
Location	Near Santa Rosa, Mendoza, Argentina
Result	Federalist victory

Belligerents
Federalists	Unitarians

Commanders and leaders
Facundo Quiroga	José Videla Castillo

Strength
Cavalry: 350–400	Men: 1,000–2,500 (Note: Probably the Unitarian strength was between 1,500 and 2,000); Cannons: 4

The Battle of Rodeo del Chacón, fought in Potrero de Chacón, Argentina on 28 March 1831, was a battle during the civil war between Unitarian and Federalist forces. It ended with the victory of General Facundo Quiroga, one of the most capable and well known of the Federalist caudillos.

== Background ==
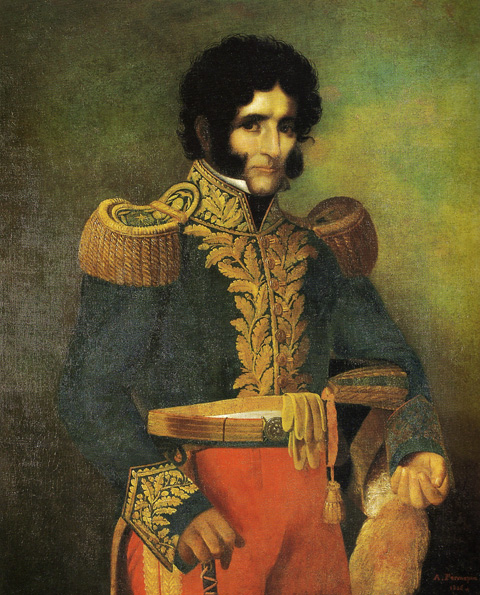
Facundo Quiroga in 1836

The civil war that broke out with the shooting of Manuel Dorrego by order of Juan Lavalle in Buenos Aires mostly took place in Córdoba Province, where the battles of San Roque, La Tablada and Oncativo were fought. These three were victories of the Unitarian General José María Paz. The Federalist leader in the last two was Juan Facundo Quiroga. Quiroga decided not to fight on, even at the request of the governor of Buenos Aires, Juan Manuel de Rosas. But in late 1830 Quiroga learned of the violence that General Gregorio Aráoz de Lamadrid, whom Quiroga had already beaten twice, had committed against his family. His mother had been paraded in chains through the street of La Rioja, and his wife and children had been forced into exile in Chile. Their property had been stolen by Lamadrid, who held the government of La Rioja.

Quiroga then decided to return to action. He asked Rosas for asked any group of men, and he was given 450 prisoners and homeless people, whom he moved to Pergamino (Buenos Aires) and trained as soldiers. He then advanced to the south of Córdoba Province. Along the way he picked up soldiers who had deserted from the Unitarian army unit in the Battle of Fraile Muerto, a victory of Buenos Aires General Ángel Pacheco. With these forces he occupied the city of Río Cuarto after a siege of several days. With his army reinforced, he invaded San Luis Province, where he defeated Colonel Juan Pascual Pringles, who was killed in a battle near the Quinto River.

== Development ==
Having occupied San Luis, Quiroga's next target was the governor of Mendoza Province, José Videla Castillo. Quiroga's rapid advance forced him to give battle before he was properly organized. Soon after Quiroga had entered Mendoza, the two armies met on 22 January 1831 at a place in the hills called Rodeo de Chacón, near the Tunuyán river. Videla Castillo's army of 1,500 men was commanded by Colonels Lorenzo Barcala, Indalecio Chenaut and José Aresti. The Federal army was commanded by Quiroga from the back of a cart, as he could not move due to the rheumatism that tortured him. His divisions were commanded by Colonels Prudencio Torres, José Ruiz Huidobro, Pantaleón Argañaraz and Juan de Dios Vargas.

At the start of the battle, Torres shouted for the soldiers who have fought under him in the campaigns of Lavalle, and who were under the command of Chenaut. They had been treated too harshly, so they just dropped out of the fight. The battle lasted only a few minutes after Quiroga launched a cavalry charge into the Unitarian ranks, which were disrupted by the desertion of Chenaut's Regiment.

== Aftermath ==
The Unitarian chiefs fled to Córdoba, where Videla Castillo was promoted to general. A few days later, General Paz was taken prisoner by the Federalists, and Lamadrid retreated with the Unitarian army to San Miguel de Tucumán. Quiroga seized Mendoza and San Luis without resistance, while his officers recovered La Rioja and San Juan almost equally peacefully. From there, a few months later Quiroga advanced to Tucuman with a new army of 2,000 men which would defeat Lamadrid in the Battle of La Ciudadela. With that, the civil war ended for some years, with all of Argentina for the first time being controlled by the Federalists.
