= Martín Yanzón =

Argentine caudillo (1799–1844)

Governor of San Juan Province, Argentina
- In office 4 May 1834 – 9 January 1836
- Preceded by: Valentín Ruiz
- Succeeded by: José Luciano Fernández

Personal details
- Born: 1799 San Juan, Intendency of Córdoba, Viceroyalty of the Río de la Plata, Spanish Empire (now in Argentina)
- Died: 1844 (aged 44–45) Santa Maria, Catamarca, Argentina

Martín Yanzón (1799 – 29 July 1842 ) was an Argentine soldier and caudillo who died fighting against the supporters of the dictator Juan Manuel de Rosas.

== Early years ==
Martín Yanzón was born in San Juan, Argentina in 1799. He joined the Army of the Andes in 1818, but did not campaign to Chile. He participated in the civil war that shook San Juan Province after the 1820 revolution. He supported the invasion of Facundo Quiroga in 1825, and the Federalist governments that followed. In 1830 he participated in the Battle of Pilar in Mendoza Province, but later submitted to the Unitarian government of his province. In 1831 he joined Quiroga's army and fought under his command in the Battle of La Ciudadela, and was promoted to colonel by Governor Valentín Ruiz.

In 1833 Yanzón served in Rosas' desert campaign under the command of José Félix Aldao. In this campaign, Yanzón and Nazario Benavídez, both later to be provincial governors, were on the staff of the second Auxiliary regiment of the Andes commanded by Aldao. This column gained a partial victory over the Ranquel chief Yanquetruz, in the battle of Arroyo del Rosario on 31 March and 1 April 1833. The regiment participated in the fierce fighting in which the Argentines prevailed, but suffered considerable losses in a later ambush.

== Governor of San Juan ==
On 4 May 1834, with support from Quiroga, Yanzón was appointed governor of San Juan Province. His government was relatively active. He improved the banks of the San Juan River, which had periodically overflowed and completely flooded the city. He reorganized the judicial system for tax purposes, and divided the city into two departments, North and South, based on the parishes of Pueblo Viejo (Conception) and Ciudad. Each department was divided into three "barrios". He improved the municipal cemetery and divided the province into departments. His general minister was Domingo de Oro, formerly the minister of Estanislao López, a person who alternated between Unitarian and Federalist views, and who completely dominated Yanzón. He issued an amnesty law and allowed the return of several notable Unitarians. He allowed the publication of several newspapers, including one by the young Domingo Faustino Sarmiento. He kept the peace in his province when news came of the assassination of Facundo Quiroga.

Yanzón's first major problem came at the end of 1835, when a revolution was crushed in Mendoza Province. It was clear that it had been organized from San Juan by Colonel Lorenzo Barcala, the most famous of the black officers in Argentina's history. Governor Aldao demanded that Oro deliver him, while Barcala accused Oro of being behind the revolution. After Barcala had been executed by firing squad, Yanzón replaced Oro at the insistence of Aldao, but did not deliver him to Aldao. In support of Aldao, Colonel Nazario Benavídez demanded Yanzón's resignation, but was defeated and forced to flee. Benavídez took refuge in Buenos Aires, where he became a friend of the Governor Juan Manuel de Rosas.

Yanzón in turn accused the governor of La Rioja Province with supporting Benavídez. In alliance with the Riojan leader Angel Vicente Peñaloza ("Chacho" Peñaloza) he invaded the neighboring province. Since he had very few men, he counted only on surprise, but he failed and was defeated by Colonel Tomás Brizuela in the first days of 1836. Brizuela immediately invaded San Juan and occupied the capital. Yanzón and Oro fled to Chile, while Benavídez assumed the government of San Juan, and was to rule the province for the next two decades.

== Later career ==
Yanzón returned to La Rioja in early 1840, in support of the Northern Coalition opposition to Rosas. He tried to retake power in San Juan, but Benavídez was very strong in his position, and the attempt failed. He remained for some time in La Rioja, protected by his former enemy Brizuela, and then joined forces with Gregorio Aráoz de Lamadrid, participating in the Battle of Rodeo del Medio, after which he returned to Chile.

The following year Yanzón was second in command of "Chacho" Peñaloza in their invasion of San Juan and La Rioja. Pursued by Benavidez, they advanced through Jáchal, La Rioja, Catamarca and Tucumán. But they were routed by Benavidez near the city of San Miguel de Tucumán. They were separated. While Peñaloza returned to La Rioja, where he would be definitely defeated seven months later, Yanzón fled north almost alone north from Catamarca Province, from where he planned to flee to Copiapo, Chile. But he was caught in Santa María, Catamarca by a party of the caudillo Eusebio Balboa. He was executed by shooting squad there on 29 July 1842.
