= Ángel Pacheco (general) =

Argentine military officer

Angel Pacheco
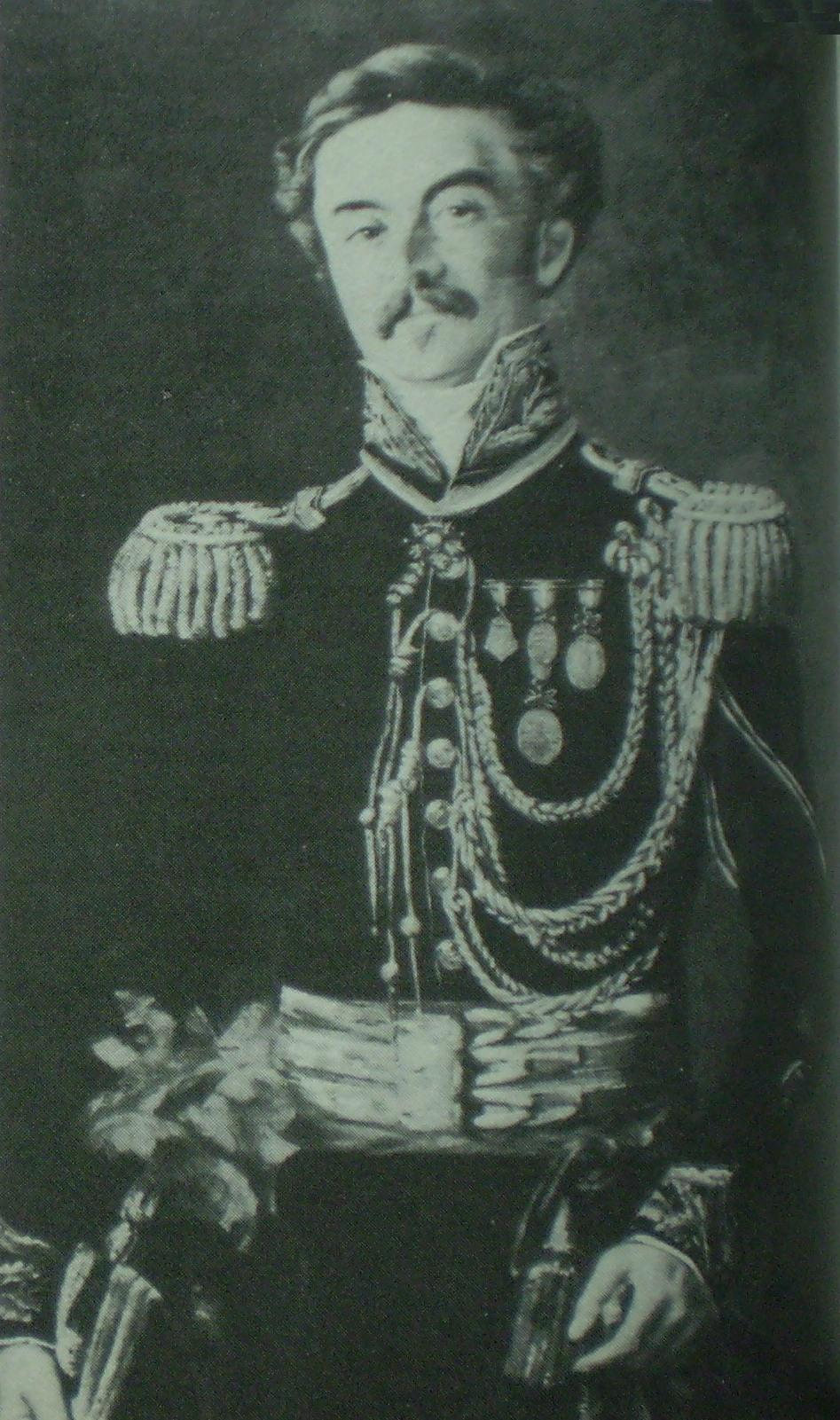
- Born: April 13, 1793; Buenos Aires or Santiago de Chile
- Died: September 25, 1869 (aged 76); Buenos Aires
- Occupation: Military commander

Ángel Pacheco (April 13, 1793 – September 25, 1869), was an Argentine military officer trained by José de San Martín who later became one of the top commanders in the Confederacy during the government of Juan Manuel de Rosas. He never lost a battle in which he was in command.

== Early life and family ==
His birthplace is unclear and debated, as some sources say he was born in Buenos Aires in July 1793, but others, such as the historian Carlos Calvo, assert he was born in Santiago de Chile. Other sources assert he was born in Buenos Aires but in June 1795. His parents were Julián Pacheco, a Spaniard, and Teresa Concha, who was Chilean. He studied at the Royal College of San Carlos.

In 1822, he married María Dolores Reinoso and had six children: José, Román, Julio, Eduardo, Pablo and Elvira.

== Early career ==
In 1811 he joined the Patricios Regiment as a cadet, but on November 22, 1812, he was reassigned to the Horse Grenadiers Regiment. This unit had its "baptism of fire" at the Battle of San Lorenzo. His actions were responsible for providing food and horses for the Grenadiers advancing to San Lorenzo, and as a forward observer in combat he earned a "battlefield promotion" to Lieutenant of the 1st Squadron on February 26, 1813. He remained in the convent of San Carlos with a squad of 40 men, with which he defeated a larger landing force in the Battle of Rincón de Zárate in August 1813. He also served in part of the Second Siege of Montevideo, a long siege which lasted from 1812 until June 1814 when the cities Spanish forces finally surrendered to forces under the command of General Carlos María de Alvear.

In November 1813, he was transferred to the Northern Army, and on December 4 was again promoted to the rank of Lieutenant. He covered the withdrawal of Cuban troops after their defeat at Ayohuma Vilcapugio and participated in the actions of then Keeper of the Marquis, and Sipe Sipe, in which he received a large wound in the arm. In 1815 he was promoted to Adjutant.

In 1816 he was transferred to Mendoza where he joined the Army of the Andes, crossing to Chile under General José de San Martín in the column of Mariano Necochea, whose escort was a part. Under the command of Necochea, he participated in combating bribery. On February 12, 1817, he fought in the Battle of Chacabuco, earning another battlefield promotion to Captain for his actions, which was later conferred and made permanent on February 27. He left for Buenos Aires to bring trophies from Chacabuco, and on March 10, the Supreme Director Pueyrredón promoted him to Sergeant Major. Returning to Chile, he participated in the battles of Curapalihue, Talcahuano, Cancha Rayada and Maipú. He led the second campaign in southern Chile during 1818 and 1819.

Shortly after the Battle of Cepeda he left to serve in Buenos Aires, and was ordered by Governor Manuel Dorrego to lead the campaign against the province of Santa Fe, where he claimed victories at San Nicolas de los Arroyos and Arroyo Pavón, where he defeated Gamonal. For many years he served in the Cavalry of the Frontier against the Indians ranqueles.

He later commanded a battalion of cavalry in the War of Brazil, and excelled in the victory of Ituzaingó. He became the second Chief of the No. 3 Cavalry Regiment whose previous chief, Colonel Frederick Brandsen, had died in combat, after taking command of the regiment during the battle in the aftermath of Brandsen's death. He also fought in a few final minor battles of the war, including Camacuá. On the May 1, 1827, he received shipments of cash, and on September 7 was appointed Commander in Chief of the Northern Department of the province of Buenos Aires.

== Civil War and the Indian border ==
In 1828, Colonel Frederick Rauch was replaced as head of the northern border with the Indians, based in Salto, by order of Governor Dorrego, which earned the hatred of Prussia. Pacheco refused to endorse Juan Lavalle in the revolution of December 1828 and instead wanted to help Dorrego, who was defeated before Pacheco could join. His second in command, Mariano Acha, fell to the forces of the rebels and was arrested by Lavalle, who shot him. Pacheco took refuge in Santa Fe and returned with Juan Manuel de Rosas, who led the campaign that ended with the defeat of Lavalle after the Battle of Puente de Márquez.

Pacheco later headed the campaign of 1831 against the League of Interior led by General Jose Maria Paz and Stephen Pederson. His victory was due to his good tactics, but more importantly to the defection of many enemy soldiers, many of which were former soldiers of Facundo Quiroga that had been forcibly incorporated into the League's army. With that victory began the fall of the League, which led Pacheco to occupy the city of Cordoba. Following his victory in Fraile Muerto he was promoted to Colonel.

In 1833 he made the desert campaign as chief of staff to Rosas, and they reached what is now the city of Neuquén. On his return he was promoted to general. During the later years of crisis he was elected governor, but denied the office.

In the following years he was made the deputy provincial minister of war several times, and the inspector of war. Rosas was a personal friend, and Pacheco became a major landowner in large part due to awards from the Rosas government.

== The campaign within ==
In August 1840 General Lavalle invaded the province of Buenos Aires, landing in San Pedro. Pacheco did not have enough forces to face him, so they scattered their horses and surrounded them. Lavalle rode near Buenos Aires, but was trapped between the forces of Pacheco and Rosas, resulting in Lavalle's eventual defeat. Pacheco gave chase to Santa Fe under the command of General Manuel Oribe, former President of Uruguay, and the army fought at the Battle of Quebracho Herrado with Pacheco as head of the cavalry. Their federal action decided the victory.

When Lavalle came back to La Rioja, Mendoza sent Colonel Vilela their best forces. Pacheco, with a smaller force, chased and defeated him during a surprise night attack in San Cala.

Pacheco returned to Cordoba for a few months until he went to Cuyo, then to the army unit of Lamadrid. After taking San Juan, he retired to Mendoza. Pacheco took command of an army that included José Félix Mendoza Aldana and Nazario Benavides, with whom Lamadrid tore apart in the bloody Battle of Rodeo del Medio. There ended the civil war which had started more than two years earlier.

== Uruguayan Civil War, Frontier Centre, and Election to Provincial Legislature ==
In the Battle of Arroyo Grande on the December 6, 1842, Pacheco ordered the army infantry affiliates of the Confederation and the "White" Uruguayan forces (whose commander in chief was the deposed former president Manuel Oribe) under his command east, against the forces of the "Red" Uruguayan and Argentine unit led by Fructuoso Rivera. Pacheco's command of the troops was decisive, destroying the center and the artillery of the enemy. In 1843 and 1844 Pacheco participated in yet another siege against the city of Montevideo, this one later being known as the Great Siege of Montevideo.

In 1845 he was appointed head of the Frontier Centre Buenos Aires province, fought off raid attempts by ranqueles Indians, and ordered to form a strong Mulitas in Bragado.

In 1850 he was elected a member of the Legislature of the Province.

== Later Years and Death ==
In 1851, Justo José de Urquiza took the lead in opposition to Rosas which later culminated in the forming of the Grand Army from a coalition of Argentine Rebel, Uruguayan Liberation, and Brazilian Allied forces which started a two front war against both the Uruguayan and Argentine governments. After invading and overthrowing the Uruguaian President Oribe, Urguiza then focused his forces on Argentina by invading Santa Fe, and from there moving on to Buenos Aires.

For the first time, Pacheco and Rosas disagreed on strategy in regards to what steps they should take next to deal with the threat of the Grand Army, and the governor became wary of his general. Feeling left out of key decision making from that point, Pacheco retired to his quarters. Rosas then assumed direct command of the army. On February 3, 1852, Rosas was defeated at the Battle of Caseros and forced to resign and go into exile in Britain.

Pacheco also left and traveled the Americas, in particular spending much time in Havana.

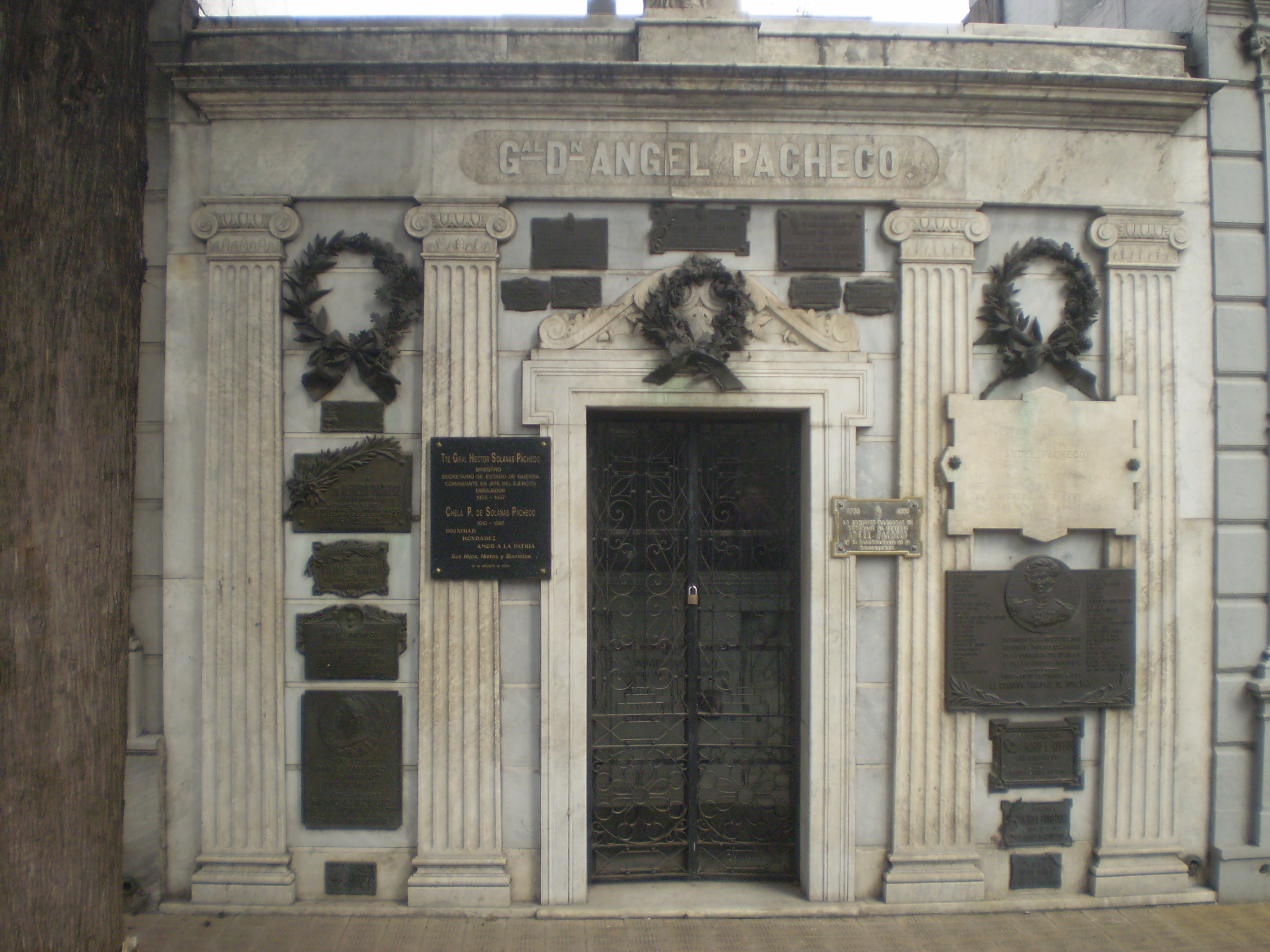
Pacheco's tomb

He returned to Buenos Aires after the Revolution of 11 September 1852, when Buenos Aires was dominated by his old unit and separated from the rest of the country. Pacheco organized the defense of the capital during the siege imposed by General Hilario Lagos.

Pacheco formally retired from the military in mid-1853. During the following years he was Minister of War of the State of Buenos Aires, and Special Envoy to the government of Brazil.

He spent the rest of his days staying in his Talar, now known as "Talar de Pacheco".

According to Ernesto Quesada, Pacheco "asked not to be political either before, during or after Rosas. His badge of honor, glory, was to have been a soldier of St. Martin. He did not aspire to something else. Born with the military vocation, he died without having given up once in his life. He was a man of the world's legendary gallantry with the ladies, being known for his deep respect for women in general."

He died in Buenos Aires in 1869. The burial of his remains was attended by many, including the poet Carlos Guido y Spano and General Bartolomé Mitre. He was buried in the cemetery of Recoleta.

== Notes ==
1. This year of birth would be more consistent with his record of military service, and that would be correct sitting position as a cadet at age 17 Patricios.

== Bibliography ==
- National Academy of History, Parties battle of the civil wars, BA, 1977.
- Araoz de Lamadrid, Gregory, Memoirs, BA, 1895.
- Beruti, Juan Manuel, Memoirs curious Emecé Ed, BA, 2001.
- Beverin, John, The campaigns of the liberating armies 1838–1852, BA, 1923.
- Bischoff, Efraín U., SANCAL's surprise, magazine Todo es Historia, no. 257.
- Busa, José Luis, Historia Argentina. Taurus Ed, BA, 2005. ISBN 987-04-0078-7
- Camogli, Paul, battles for freedom, Ed Aguilar, BA, 2005. ISBN 987-04-0105-8
- Cutolo, Vicente, Nuevo Argentine biographical dictionary, Ed Elche, Buenos Aires, 1968–1985.
- Irazusta, July, political life of Juan Manuel de Rosas through correspondence. Ed Albatros, Buenos Aires, 1943.
- Mitre, Bartolomé, Historia de San Martín and South American emancipation. Eudeba Ed, BA, 1968.
- Paz, Gustavo L., The Civil Wars (1820–1870), EUDEBA, BA, 2007. ISBN 978-950-23-1596-6
- Quesada, Ernesto, Acha and battle Angaco, Ed Plus Ultra, Buenos Aires, 1965.
- Quesada, Ernesto, Lavalle and the battle of Quebracho Herrado, Ed Plus Ultra, Buenos Aires, 1965.
- Quesada, Ernesto, Pacheco and the campaign of Cuyo, Ed Plus Ultra, Buenos Aires, 1965.
- Ras, Norberto, War by cows, Ed Galerna, BA, 2006. ISBN 987-05-0539-2
- Rosas, Juan Manuel, Journal of the expedition to the desert, Ed Plus Ultra, Buenos Aires, 1965.
- Rube, Julio Horacio, The Way Home. Memorial de la Patria, Volume IX, Ed La Bastille, BA, 1984.
- Ruiz Moreno, Isidoro J., Argentine military campaigns, Volume II, Ed Emecé, BA, 2006. ISBN 950-04-2794-X
- Saldías, Adolfo, History of Argentina Confederation, Ed Hyspamérica, BA, 1987.
