= Estancia Maradona =

Estancia de Maradona
- Ranch, Protected area
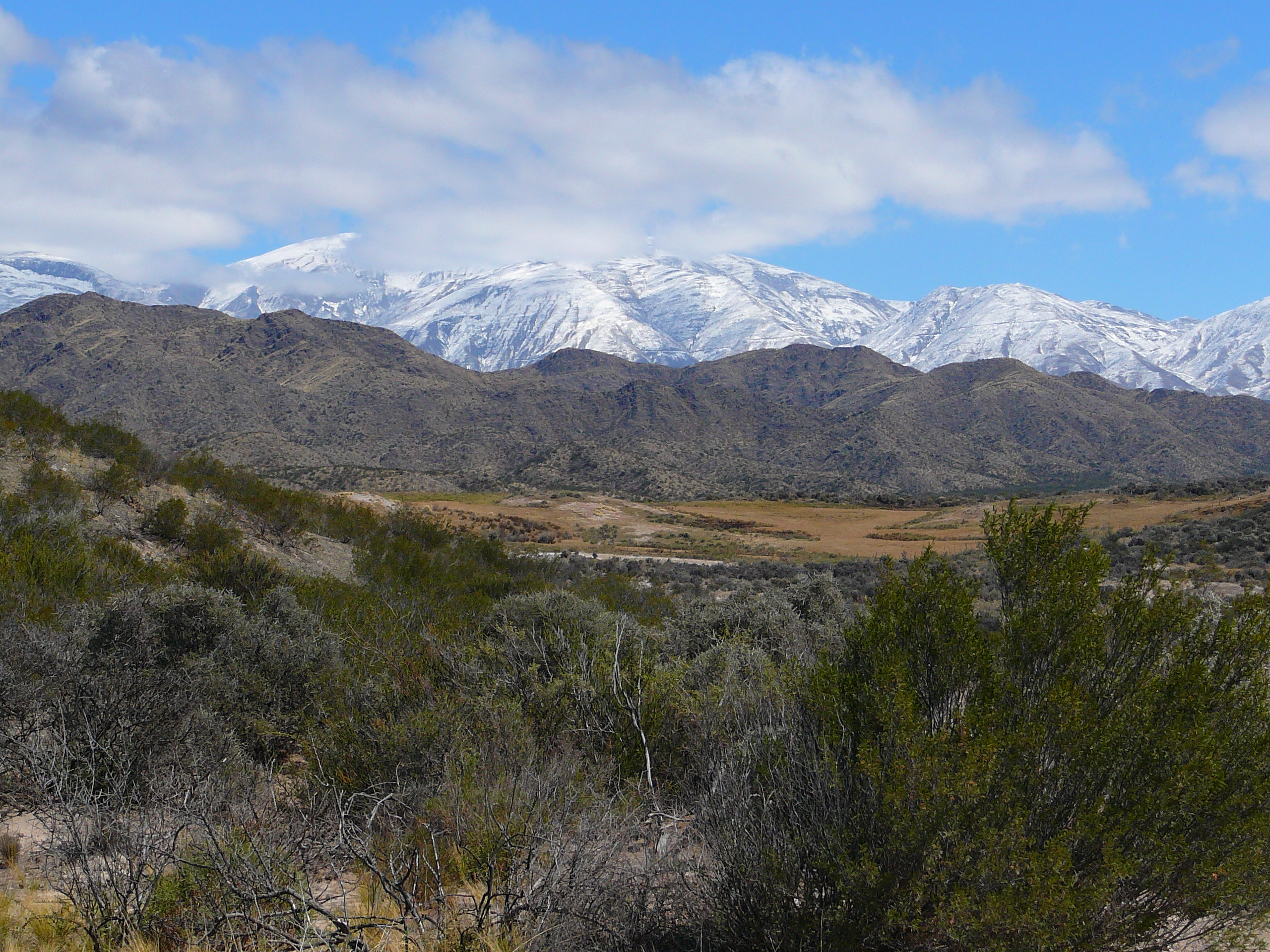
- Country around Estancia Maradona

- Location within Argentina
- Coordinates: 31.763°S 68.890°W
- Country: Argentina
- Province: San Juan Province
- Department: Zonda Department

Area
  - Total: 41,000 ha (100,000 acres)
- Time zone: UTC−3 (ART)

The Estancia Maradona is a protected area in San Juan Province, Argentina, about 50 kilometres (31 mi) southwest of San Juan, Argentina. It covers just over 41,000 hectares (100,000 acres), and lies at the foot of the foothills near the Sierra Chica de Zonda.

In March 1831 an armed party of forty men under Nasario Benavides were making the Estancia de Don Manuel Maradona their base while preparing to return to San Juan during the Argentine Civil Wars. Today, Estancia Maradona is an area where guanacos are conserved. Due to its proximity to the city, poaching is a problem. The land is rugged. Although the estancia is private property, it is used without permission for recreation by people with all-terrain vehicles.
