= José Luciano Fernández =

Argentinian politician

Governor of San Juan Province, Argentina
- In office 9 January 1836 – 26 February 1836
- Preceded by: José Martín Yanzón
- Succeeded by: Nazario Benavídez

José Luciano Fernández was briefly acting Governor of San Juan Province, Argentina after the Unitarian Governor José Martín Yanzón had been defeated by Colonel Tomás Brizuela. A few weeks later, he handed over power to Nazario Benavídez.

== Background ==
Nazario Benavídez had attempted a revolution against Colonel Yanzón, Governor of San Juan, in August 1836. After it failed, Benavídez was forced to flee, and on 22 September 1835 was declared an outlaw by Yanzón. Yanzón mounted a raid against La Rioja Province, but on 5 January 1836 Yanzón was defeated at Pango, near to La Rioja, Argentina, by forces commanded by General Tomás Brizuela. Brizuela followed up by invading San Juan with a force of more than 700 horsemen.

== Acting governor of San Juan ==
On 9 January José Luciano Fernández was declared acting governor in an emergency meeting shortly before Brizuela arrived. When he met Brizuela, he was given a demand for money, equipment, livestock and horse in compensation for the invasion of La Rioja. Fernández could not comply, and the forces from La Rioja proceeded to rampage through the town causing considerable damage. Property was stolen, women raped and men beaten up. While they scrambled to raise money to pay off Brizuela and get him to leave, the leaders in San Juan began thinking of calling on Benavides, a proven soldier, to help them out. On 28 January Fernández repealed the decree outlawing Benavídez, and on 26 February 1836 Benavídez was elected governor. Benevides was able to negotiate better terms with Brizuela, who finally left in late March, laden with booty.
