= Timoteo Maradona =

- Born: 1793; San Juan, Argentina
- Died: 24 August 1863 (aged 69–70)
- Occupation(s): Politician and priest
- Known for: Governor of San Juan Province; Ecclesiastical governor of the Bishopric of San Juan de Cuyo

Timoteo Maradona (1793 – 24 August 1863) was an Argentine official and priest who played a leading role in San Juan Province in the first half of the nineteenth century.

== Early years ==
Timoteo Maradona was born in 1793 in San Juan, Argentina. He was the son of José Ignacio Fernández Maradona, a leading citizen of San Juan who was Deputy for San Juan in 1911. He married Antonia Videla, who had several children. For many years she was very sick. He was an appellate judge before becoming head of the provincial government. Maradona's opinions were Federalist, Catholic and Nationalistic.

== Politician ==
Maradona was elected governor in 1828, and in 1829 and 1836 had to act as governor. During the twenty years that Nazario Benavídez was governor of San Juan, on several occasions Maradona was his deputy governor when Benavídez had to leave the province. In 1839 he had a confrontation with Domingo Faustino Sarmiento, whom he criticised for misrepresenting facts about public finances in his anti-Federalist paper El Zonda. Sarmiento described them as a corrupt and evil syndicate.

== Priest ==
In 1844, on the death of his wife, Maradona left politics to join the church. He became ecclesiastical governor of the Bishopric of San Juan de Cuyo. As a priest he did not hesitate to criticise the Governor Francisco Domingo Díaz, who imprisoned him in 1858 and eventually deported him to Paraná, Entre Ríos on the basis of a decree of 5 February 1857 issued by Salvador María del Carril that gave him that authority. Maradona died on 24 August 1863, at age 70, during the governorship of Sarmiento.
