= Montoneras =

Martín Miguel de Güemes leading a guerrilla of gauchos

The Montoneras originally were known as the armed civilian, paramilitary groups who organized in the 19th century during the wars of independence from Spain in Hispanic America. They played an important role in the Argentine Civil War, as well as in other Hispanic-American countries during the 19th-century, generally operating in rural areas. Montoneras across Latin America were essentially groups of gauchos who mobilized against authorities. These groups had a hierarchical structure that focused on organizing the gauchos in the most effective way to achieve their goals, and they typically fought in the style of guerilla warfare.

In the 20th century, the term was applied to some insurgent groups in countries of Central and South America. Generally, these were paramilitary groups composed of people from a locality who provided armed support to a particular cause or leader. In 1970, the left-wing Montoneros guerrillas in Argentina adopted their name from the 19th century militias.

== Etymology ==
Several philologists think that montonera is derived from montón (crowd) because the men marched in a disorderly fashion. Others think it derives from montes (mountains), as the men used the backcountry as their defensive bases. Others said that the first fighters were montados (mounted) on horseback.

As Montoneras appeared spontaneously in towns that revolted, attacking isolated Royalist garrisons and quickly dispersed when confronted by a superior force to regroup later, historians have compared them to the guerrillas who fought in Spain during its war of independence, part of the Peninsular War, or guerrillas in other areas.

The Spanish historian Manuel Ovilo y Otero noted they operated similarly to those guerrillas fighting in Spain against Napoleon's troops from 1808 to 1814.

The English officer William Miller, who served in Wellington's army during his campaign in Spain and then in South America, said that the montoneras in Peru served an invaluable function as an auxiliary force. Their value was similar to that of guerillas in the Peninsular War.

== Argentina ==
In the history of Argentina, "montoneras" were usually military units from rural areas, generally cavalry, led by local caudillos. They participated in the Argentine Civil Wars of the nineteenth century.

=== Features ===
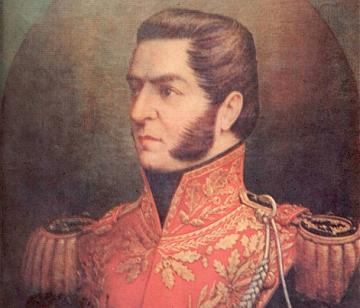
Posthumous portrait of Francisco Ramírez

The montoneras units were relatively unorganized, based in rural areas and generally operated in rural areas, where they had the advantage of being on their home turf. They were associated with the concept of local rural militias.

Forces designated and authorized as "militias" supported the provincial government, while montoneras were insurgents against it. When montoneras succeeded in overthrowing a provincial government to one they supported, they became classified as "rural militias". Similarly, many rural militias became montoneras when they lost the support of the provincial government. (Note: The most typical example is the militia of La Rioja Province commanded by Chacho Peñaloza, who lost the favor of the provincial government after the Battle of Pavón. His forces continued the war against the Buenos Aires invaders as montoneras.)

The capitals of the most populous provinces, especially Buenos Aires and, to a lesser extent, Córdoba, had major urban militia forces. These defended only the cities.

The degree of organization of the montoneras depended on the circumstances. For example, the montoneras organized by Blas Basualdo in Entre Ríos Province in 1814 from historic accounts appear to have been mobs of men without discipline. They achieved some success thanks only to his courage and boldness. Those who were organized in the same province a few years later, commanded by Francisco Ramírez, were said to have had remarkable discipline, organization and command. They repeatedly overcome superior forces of regular "line" troops.

The montoneras often used rudimentary combat tactics, but they adapted to the conditions on the frontiers of Argentina. They often had to travel long distances through the unpopulated country between towns and cities, and to fight in places dictated by natural geographical features, choosing locations where the proximity of waterways or mountains of trees could give them an advantage. However, when they were mounted troops, they chose more open areas for confrontation with government forces.

Generally, the troops were eager to contact the enemy and fight them in melee. Their leaders preferred to pursue a guerrilla strategy of quick attacks and withdrawals. They could wear down the regular troops and hinder their maneuvers, defeating any group that strayed from the main enemy army. Estanislao López, the leader of the province of Santa Fe, is often quoted for his strategies of attrition. He maintained the autonomy of his province from the enemy armies, defeating such military leaders as Juan Ramón Balcarce, Manuel Dorrego, Juan Lavalle and José María Paz. He ultimately achieved victory over his former ally Francisco Ramírez.

=== Historical appreciation of the term ===
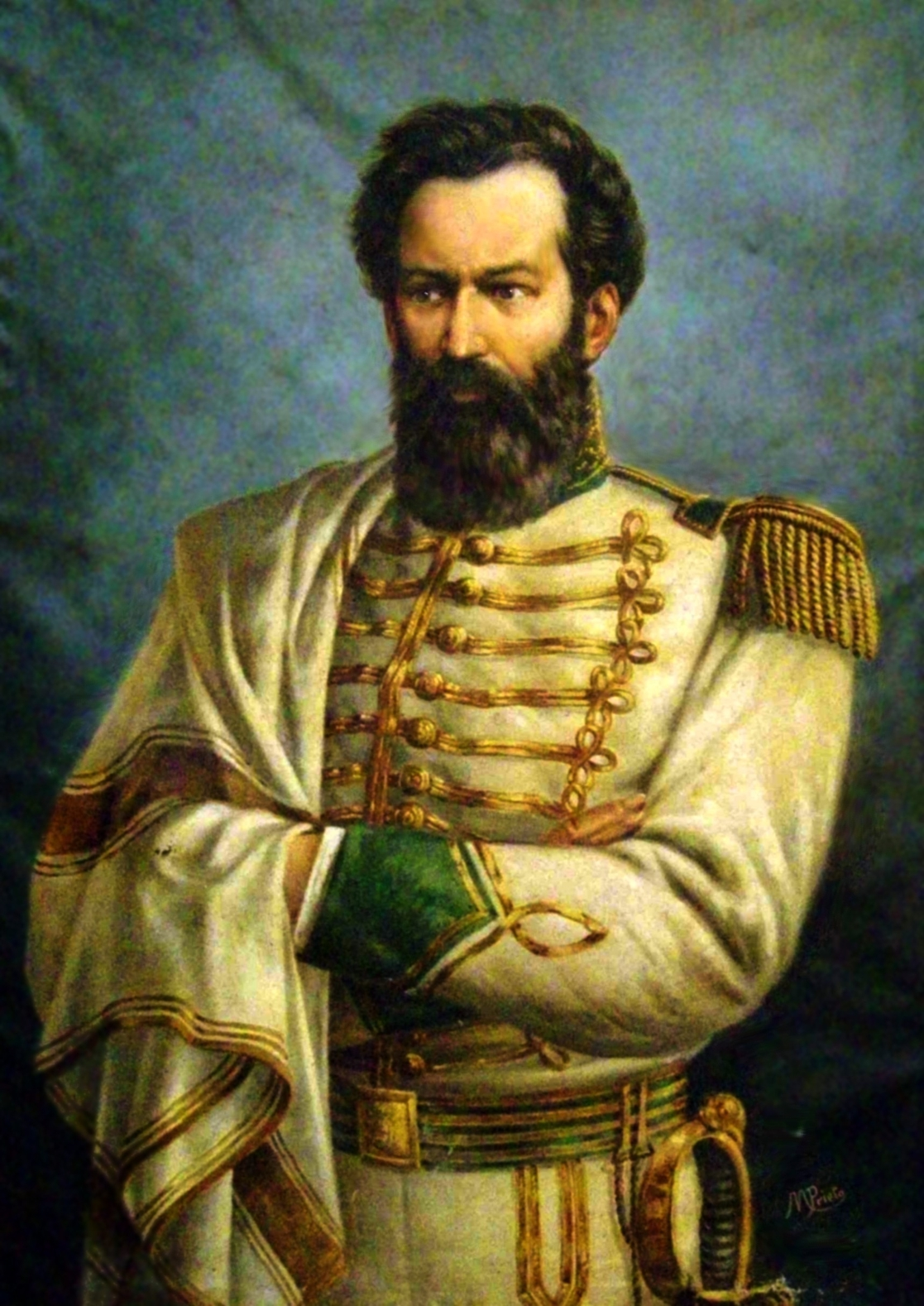
Martín Miguel de Güemes

In Argentina's historiography, the term montonera is often used in a derogatory sense, especially by historians identifying with the central governments. At one time, historians avoided using the term montoneras to describe the fighters who defended the north of the country during the war of independence. But, like the later Federalist leaders, Martín Miguel de Güemes used irregular cavalry. Revisionist historians have sometimes praised the montoneras as authentic defenders of provincial federalism against the centralism of Buenos Aires Province.

In the last third of the 20th century, the name was adopted by the Montoneros, a leftist guerrilla movement in Argentina. Their ideology, on the left of Peronistas before they were expelled from the party, and methodology had little in common with the montoneras of the 19th century.

=== Evolution of weaponry and tactics ===
The rural men used weapons at hand, often nothing more than lances, before they gained guns. When they gained firearms, they adapted their combat tactics. As the 19th century advanced, the increased number of fighters had to rely on less expensive weapons; they used spears combined with sabers, and failing that, the most primitive weapons, including indigenous bolas.

In Santiago del Estero Province, the insurgent leader Juan Felipe Ibarra used a defense of a "scorched earth" policy. As the borders of the province were particularly difficult to control, each time the province was invaded, he let the enemies occupy the provincial capital. Then his forces deprived them of food and water, forcing the invaders to leave the province.

From 1828 onward, some provinces started to have formal armies, especially Buenos Aires and, to a lesser extent, Córdoba. General José María Paz led the formal military of the latter province. After his fall, rural militias of Cordoba returned to their preferred montonera style of organization.

Buenos Aires Province preferred to organize professional armies, limiting the action of rural militias to defense against the Indians. During the war against the Northern Coalition, the superiority of the Buenos Aires professional army decided the fight. They defeated the army of General Juan Lavalle, who tried to organize popular montoneras.

During the period called the "National Organization", after the enactment of the 1853 Constitution of Argentina, the struggle between political groups was expressed in fighting between regular troops and montoneras. After the Battle of Pavón, the montoneras were more often defeated by the increasingly modern weapons and distance tactics of the line infantry.

Ángel Vicente Peñaloza led the first war against the national government, and was defeated by the better training and equipment of the regular national cavalry. In these struggles, the superiority of the infantry always determined the results. The last of the federalist warlords, Ricardo López Jordán, was beaten repeatedly because the montoneras were superior. The last Unitarian caudillo, the former President Bartolomé Mitre, was defeated by the superiority of the regular infantry against his montoneras. At that time, the word "montonera" was applied only to Federalists. The organization of troops who supported Mitre in 1874 was montonera.

== Peru ==
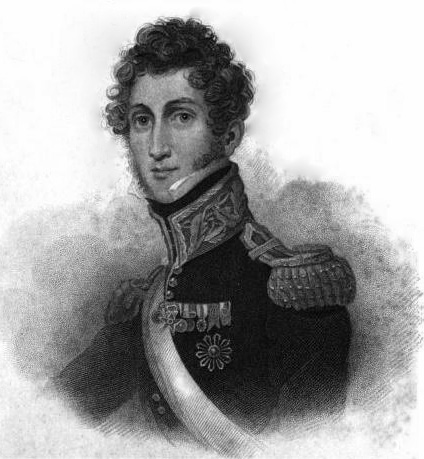
William Miller, known as Guillermo Miller in Latin America

In Peru the name "montoneras" is generally applied to different bodies of guerrillas who fought against the Spanish forces during the independence wars. Some units joined the Royalists. According to General Miller:

Some were mounted on mules, others on horses, some wearing bearskin hats, others helmets and many hats were downcast vicuña wool: some had feathers, but most had no feathers. Their costumes were no less varied; hussar jackets, coats infantry, and ingrown furs, removed the royalists dead, were interspersed with patriotic uniforms. To this must be added romper pants, other set, with hood and fur runs knives, short shorts, sandals, and shoes, but they were all in uniform in a garment. Each individual had a poncho he wore in the usual way, or tied around the waist, as a belt or shoulder hung fantastically, nor had any carry him to stop his tie. Their weapons were equally diverse: rifles, carbines, pistols, swords, bayonets, swords, large knives and spears or pikes, were the weapons with which chance had armed and one, and another of them, but which managed to combat with terrible effect. The commander of them, Captain ..., who had been appointed to consider their particular feats, was armed with a pistol, a rifle and a long straight sword he had taken a Spanish colonel, who was killed in single combat.

The term "montoneras" was used also to refer to irregular forces who fought during the civil wars in Peru, and later against the occupation by Chile during the War of the Pacific.

== Ecuador ==
In Ecuador, the "Montoneras" were an unorganized military phenomenon that emerged after independence in the coastal agricultural zone. They comprised an armed wing - a cavalry - of a popular opposition movement against violence committed by landowners or authorities of the new republican power. Their members included laborers on the estates, smallholders and independent workers. Over time, they became the shock troops of the Liberal Party, led by Eloy Alfaro, in the 1880s (see: Liberal Revolution of 1895).
