= Saturnino María Laspiur =

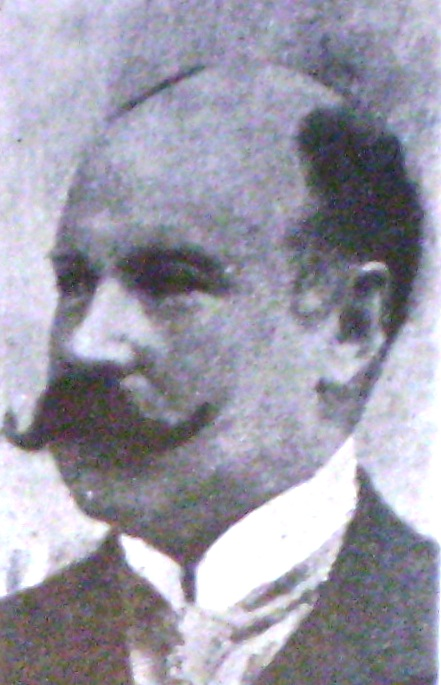
- Born: October, 1829; San Juan, Argentina
- Died: August, 1885; Buenos Aires
- Occupation(s): Lawyer, politician

Saturnino María Laspiur (October 1829 – August 1885) was an Argentine lawyer and politician who served as deputy, senator, Minister of the Supreme Court of Justice and Minister of the Interior of his country.

== Early years ==
Saturnino María Laspiur Gómez was born in San Juan, Argentina in October 1829, son of Saturnino Manuel de Laspiur. His father was a minister of the caudillo of San Juan, Nazario Benavídez, Saturnino María Laspiur became a lawyer in 1850 at the National University of Córdoba. On returning to San Juan he joined the Unitarian Party.

== Provincial politics ==
After the Battle of Caseros (3 February 1852) in which the dictator Juan Manuel de Rosas was defeated by Justo José de Urquiza, Laspiur participated in the revolution that toppled Benavidez. He was sent by the deputies appointed by the revolutionaries, Antonino Aberastain and Domingo Faustino Sarmiento to the 1853 Constituent Congress of Santa Fe. There he learned that Benavidez was back in charge, and that the two Unitarian leaders had been replaced. However, Laspiur was appointed secretary of Congress.

In 1854 Laspiur was elected national deputy for San Juan. From Paraná, Entre Ríos, the provisional capital of Argentinian Confederation, he supported the revolution against Governor Benavídez. He helped his uncle, Manuel José Gómez Rufino, to become governor of San Juan in 1857. Gómez made him his government minister in November 1857. Laspiur used his newspapers La Tribuna and El nacional to agitate for removal of the "tyrant" Benavídez.

When Benavídez was killed in prison in October 1858, federalist intervention sent him as a prisoner to Paraná, where he was prosecuted for his involvement in the murder. He rejected an offer from the minister and future president Santiago Derqui to regain his freedom in exile in Montevideo, saying he intended to accept having participated in the murder. Following the signing of the peace with the State of Buenos Aires in the Pact of San José de Flores, he was released in June 1860.

From Buenos Aires Laspiur supported the revolution in San Juan that ended with the death of Governor José Antonio Virasoro. He sent financial aid to the government of his successor, Antonino Aberastain. When Aberastain was defeated and killed, he joined the Buenos Aires press campaign against his murderers, forgetting that he had applauded the deaths of Benavidez and Virasoro. After the Battle of Pavón he was secretary of Colonel Dr. Marcos Paz in his advance inland, which toppled several Federalist governors and replaced them by Unitarians. In March 1862 he was appointed minister of one of those governments, that of Justiniano Posse in Córdoba Province.

== National stage ==
In April 1863 Laspiur was elected senator, replacing Guillermo Rawson, who had become interior minister. In November of that year he was appointed a federal judge in Córdoba. He was a member of the commission for reforming the constitution of Córdoba. For many years he taught law at the university of the province.

In September 1875 Laspiur was appointed a Minister of the Supreme Court. He excelled in that position by giving judgement independent of the other ministers, who were too dependent on government wishes. In April 1878 he was appointed Minister of the Interior by President Nicolás Avellaneda, gaining leave of absence from the court. During his tenure there were increased conflicts with government of Carlos Tejedor of Buenos Aires, which Laspiur could not avoid. To try to curb the escalating conflict, he was replaced in August 1879 by former President Sarmiento.

Laspiur returned to his post at the Supreme Court. Simultaneously, several groups named him an official candidate for the presidency of the nation. But military success of Julio Argentino Roca in the Conquest of the Desert, and Roca's evident presidential ambition convinced him to give up the nomination. Laspiur died in Buenos Aires in August 1885.
