= Zacarías Yanzi =

Argentine soldier and politician

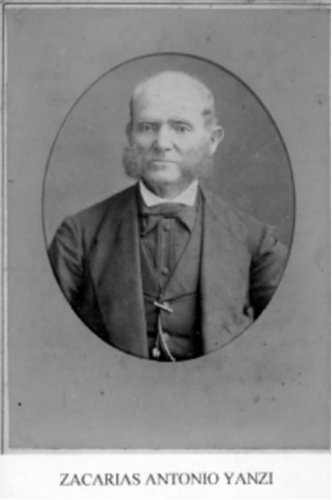
- Yanzi in 1880

Governor of San Juan Province, Argentina
- In office 29 May 1852 – 8 August 1852
- Preceded by: Nazario Benavídez
- Succeeded by: Nazario Benavídez

Personal details
- Born: February 1801 Salta, Viceroyalty of the Río de la Plata (now in Argentina)
- Died: August 1888 (aged 86–87) San Juan, Argentina
- Party: Unitarian Party
- Occupation: Merchant, soldier

Zacarías Antonio Yanzi (February 1801 – August 1888) was an Argentine soldier and politician who participated in the war of independence and served briefly as Governor of San Juan Province.

== Early years ==
Zacarías Yanzi was born in Salta, then in the Viceroyalty of the Río de la Plata, in February 1801. He joined the Northern Army in 1815, and two years later joined the gaucho troops of Martín Miguel de Güemes. He fought royalist invasions on several occasions. In 1821, when Güemes was wounded during the last major invasion, he helped him to escape from his pursuers and stayed with him until he died. He went to San Ramón de la Nueva Orán, where he was taken prisoner by the Royalists in 1831.

Yanzi spent three years in jail before being freed when Antonio José de Sucre invaded Upper Peru. In 1825 he settled in San Juan where he entered business carrying goods from the coast to the Cuyo provinces in the west of the country. For many years he had little involvement in politics or army business. During the 1840s he supported Governor Nazario Benavídez and was a provincial deputy.

== Governor of San Juan ==
In 1852 Governor Benavídez left the province to participate in the signing of the San Nicolás Agreement, leaving Yanzi as deputy governor. Yanzi was surrounded by Unitarian leaders, among whom was his minister Rosauro Doncel, most of whom had recently returned to the province after years of persecution of Juan Manuel de Rosas. The legislature deposed Benavídez in absentia and on 29 May 1852 chose Yanzi in his place.

The legislature reported the news to Benavidez, who was in San Luis, traveling back to his province. They asked Pablo Lucero, Governor of San Luis Province, to disarm the forces that accompanied Benavidez. However, Lucero understood that if he supported the coup he would be the next to fall in the hands of the Unitarians. Both wrote to the provisional President Justo José de Urquiza, who ordered that all forces of San Luis, La Rioja and Mendoza should be sent to San Juan to restore Benavídez in government. Yanzi did not try to resist, and on 8 August allowed Benavídez to peacefully enter the capital, giving up the government immediately.

== Later career ==
Yanzi spent several weeks in jail, but had no other problems. During the following years he returned to engage in commerce. In 1860 he supported the revolution that ended with the death of Governor José Antonio Virasoro, and lost a son in the battle of La Rinconada del Pocito. His home and business were looted, and he had to go into hiding for a while. Wisely, he stayed away from politics during the 1860s, in which Governor Domingo Faustino Sarmiento took his revenge, followed by the Federal Revolution of the Colorados in late 1866.

He was appointed police chief in 1873 by Governor Manuel José Gómez Rufino, a position he held until the invasion by José Miguel Arredondo the following year, during the revolution of 1874. After Arredondo's defeat, he was elected provincial deputy. In 1883 he published "Historical Notes About the Military Life of General Guemes". He died in San Juan in August 1888. Yanzi was a man of very fine manners, but had a reputation for bravery.
