= Saturnino Manuel de Laspiur =

Saturnino Manuel de Laspiur Quintana was a politician in San Juan, Argentina who was Minister to Governor Nazario Benavídez in the 1840s.

On 23 March 1820, Saturnino Manuel de Laspiur was one of the signatories on a pact of friendship between the provinces of San Juan and Mendoza. Laspiur served as acting governor between 1841 and 1844. On 7 June 1845 he was appointed Minister of Government. In March 1848 Benavídez again delegated the government to Laspiur while he was in Mendoza Province, where he commanded the forces of that province in a short campaign against the rebel commander of Fort San Rafael, Juan Antonio Rodríguez. Benavídez soon returned and resumed the government.

Saturnino Manuel de Laspiur's son, Saturnino María Laspiur Gómez, was implicated in the murder of Benavídez in October 1858. His son later served as a Minister of Interior of Argentina.
