= Battle of La Ciudadela =

Date	4 November 1831
Location	Near Tucumán, Argentina
Result	Federal victory

Belligerents
Federalist forces	Unitarian forces

Commanders and leaders
Facundo Quiroga	Gregorio Aráoz de Lamadrid

Strength
Total: 1,650 (Note: Estimates of Federalist strength range from 1,000 – 4,000. An estimate of 1,650 seems probable.); Infantry: 450–1,500; Cavalry: 1,200–1,500; Dragoons: 1,000; Artillery 200; Cannons 4	Total: 1,950–3,000 (Note: Estimates of Unitarian strength range from 1,950 to 3,000. Most of the Unitarian forces were recruits from Tucumán Province); Infantry: 750; Cavalry: 1,200

Casualties and losses
600 killed & wounded	+200 killed +1,000 prisoners

The Battle of La Ciudadela (Battle of the Citadel) was a fight during the Argentine Civil Wars between Federalist troops commanded by Facundo Quiroga and Unitarian troops of Gregorio Aráoz de Lamadrid on the outskirts of San Miguel de Tucumán, Argentina, on 4 November 1831. It resulted in a decisive victory by the Federalists.

== Background ==
The Unitarian League of the Interior had depended on the leadership of General José María Paz. With him imprisoned by the Federalists, Lamadrid returned with his army to Tucumán. Meanwhile, Quiroga regained power in Cuyo with just 450 men, but rheumatism prevented him from moving quickly enough. He was soon met in Mendoza by a force of 1,200 cavalry and 500 infantry, who decided to move towards Tucuman.

Lamadrid managed to reorganize his army of less than 1,500 men, who were very demoralized, in his home province and repelled the attacks of his enemies in Salta Province. He also held off Juan Felipe Ibarra in Rio Hondo, forcing him to return to Santiago del Estero. Quiroga sent his second in command, Bargas, to face the Unitarians in Catamarca Province, but he was defeated in Miraflores. Then Quiroga took over and moved to Tucumán, pursuing Lamadrid.

== Development ==
On 3 November at noon a fight began at Famaillá, but federal troops were detained by the thick forest. The next morning, at the Citadel, Quiroga divided his forces into two halves, the left under General José Ruiz Huidobro, and the right led by Martín Yanzón and Nazario Benavídez, who would later be governors of San Juan Province. Lamadrid's forces were commanded by Javier López and Juan Esteban Pedernera. Other prominent colonels were Juan Arengreen, José María Aparicio y José Félix Correa de Saá.

The battle took place for two hours, without decision for either side, and several times Lamadrid seemed close to victory. But Quiroga personally brought back to the battlefield each regiment that was dispersed, and slowly it became clear that victory would be for the federal forces. Furthermore, the efficiency with which the federal caudillo was obeyed, as compared to the Unitarians, made the numerical superiority of the Tucuman forces less important to the result. Lamadrid attributed the defeat to the doubts that some of his colonels had when ordered to attack, especially Pedernera.

There were fewer than fifty deaths among the federal forces, including Colonel Bargas and three other officers. Quiroga wrote about the victory: "The enemies have lost hope". The Unitarians suffered a total of over two hundred dead and over a thousand prisoners. Some 33 captured Unitarian officers were executed.

== Aftermath ==
Lamadrid and most of its officers sought refuge in Salta Province, but the provincial government refused to organize a new army to oppose Quiroga, and they had to flee to Bolivia. The federal victory ended Unitarian attempts to control Argentina for several years.

On December 2, the governors of La Rioja Province and Salta Province signed a peace agreement in Tucumán, in which Salta undertook to clearly follow federal policy and to pay the costs of the war to La Rioja. General Alejandro Heredia was elected governor of Tucumán, and through his influence the Salta government was assumed by the Federalist Pablo Latorre. Years later, Heredia would expel Latorre from his post. The most prominent Unitarian party leaders in Tucumán were forced to pay reparations demanded by Quiroga, but these were not paid off in full because of the friendship of Heredia and Quiroga. Catamarca province also was ordered to pay the cost of repairing war damage to La Rioja.
