= Miraflores, Catamarca =

Coordinates: 28°36′S 65°55′W

Miraflores (Catamarca)
- Municipality and village
- Interactive map of Miraflores (Catamarca)
- Country: Argentina
- Province: Catamarca Province
- Time zone: UTC−3 (ART)

Miraflores (Catamarca) is a village and municipality in Catamarca Province in northwestern Argentina.
