= Mariano Acha =

Governor of San Juan Province, Argentina
- In office 14 August 1841 – 21 August 1841
- Preceded by: Nazario Benavídez
- Succeeded by: José Manuel Quiroga Sarmiento

Personal details
- Born: 11 November 1799 Buenos Aires
- Died: 16 September 1841 (aged 41) Jarilla, San Luis Province, Argentina
- Occupation: Soldier
- Known for: Battle of Angaco

Mariano Acha (11 November 1799 - 16 September 1841) was a soldier who fought in the Argentine Civil Wars.

On 20 March 1841, the four hundred men led by Colonel Mariano Acha were surprised by troops under General Nazario Benavídez and scattered. In the Battle of Angaco on 16 August 1841, Acha defeated Benavides. Acha defended San Juan against the forces supporting Juan Manuel de Rosas, but after 48 hours surrendered on 22 August 1841. Although Acha surrendered under the explicit condition that his life would be spared, he was executed by firing squad on 21 September 1841. Following his execution, his body was decapitated, and his severed head was displayed publicly.
