= Facundo Quiroga =

Argentine politician and general (1788–1835)

Brigadier General Facundo Quiroga
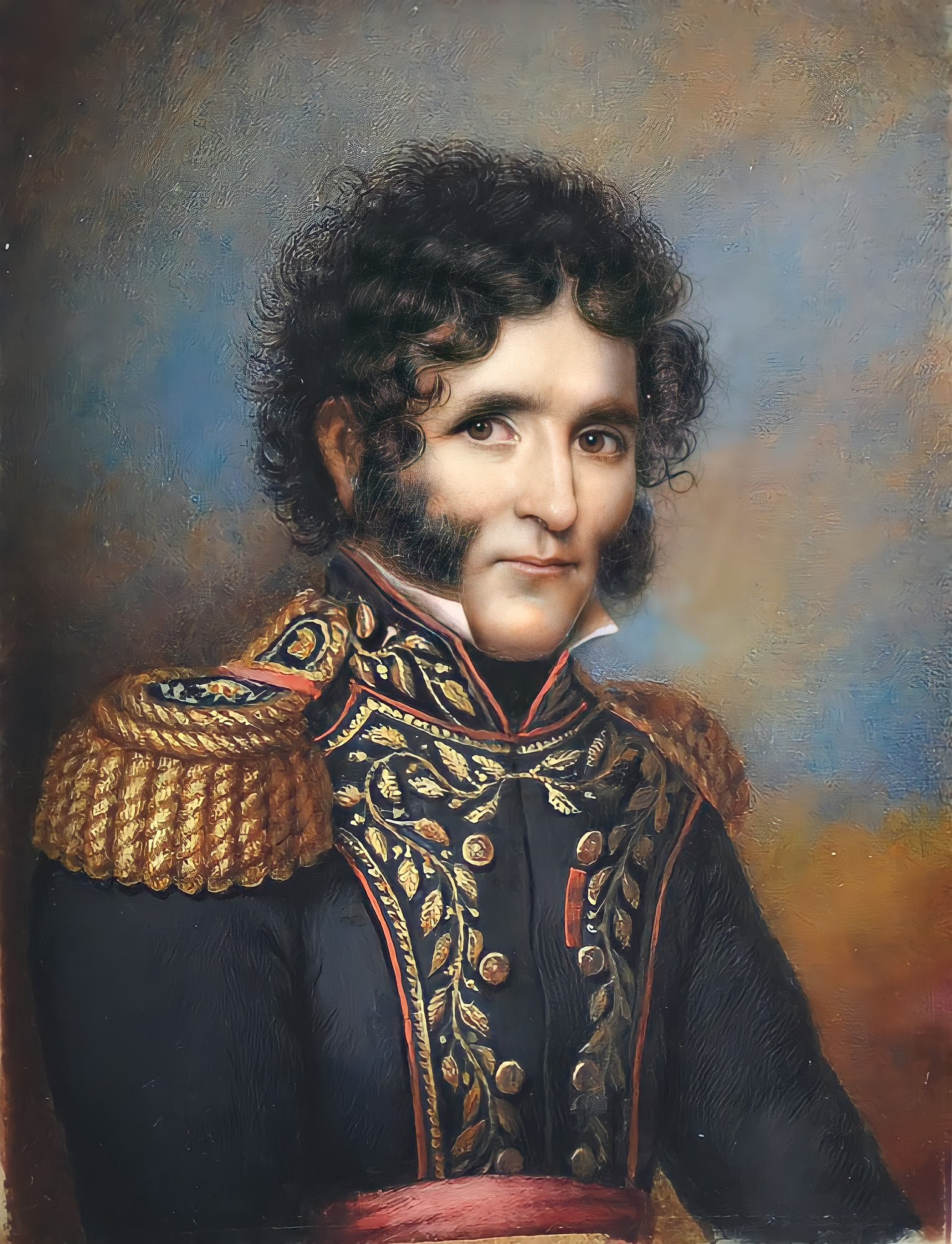
- Portrait by Fernando García del Molino.

3rd governor of La Rioja

Personal details
- Born: Juan Facundo Quiroga; 27 November 1788 La Rioja, Viceroyalty of the Río de la Plata (now Argentina)
- Died: 16 February 1835 (aged 46) Barranca Yaco, Córdoba, Argentina
- Resting place: La Recoleta Cemetery
- Party: Federal
- Nickname: El Tigre de los Llanos

Military service
- Allegiance: Argentine Confederation
- Battles/wars: Desert Campaign (1833–1834); Argentine Civil Wars, Battle of Rincón de Valladares, Battle of La Ciudadela,

Juan Facundo Quiroga (27 November 1788 – 16 February 1835) was an Argentine politician, military officer, governor, and caudillo. He was an important federal supporter during the Argentine Civil Wars, after his brief participation in the Argentine War of Independence. In his province, La Rioja, Quiroga is seen as a hero due to his efforts to give more autonomy to La Rioja.

== Early years ==
Quiroga was born in San Antonio, La Rioja, the son of a traditional but impoverished Riojan family of cattle breeders descended from the Visigothic king Reccared I. Quiroga was sent at a young age to San Juan to be educated. Early in his life, he became a problem child, and escaped from school. During wanderings in the desert between San Juan and La Rioja, he purportedly encountered and killed a cougar, earning him the nickname El Tigre de los Llanos ("the Tiger of the Plains", after the Llanos, the region of his birth).

After the May Revolution proclaimed the self-rule of the country, Quiroga tried to enter the independentist army. He travelled to San Luis to enter the Granaderos a Caballo Regiment, led by General José de San Martín. He was imprisoned and eventually expelled due to his bad temper.

He moved back to La Rioja and became a businessman until 1820. That year the central government of Buenos Aires fell, and the province became autonomous.

== Governor of La Rioja and federalist leader ==
Revolutionary flags used by Quiroga, all reading "Religion or Death"

Quiroga entered the provincial army and quickly rose to its command, gaining control of the government through his charisma. During the time of the Constitutional Congress of 1824, Quiroga led its forces through the Andean provinces to oppose the centralist tendencies of President Bernardino Rivadavia and the officers of the National Army, which were carrying away a compulsory levy for the upcoming Cisplatine War (1825–1827).

Advised by monarchist priest Pedro Ignacio de Castro Barros, Quiroga declared a religious war on Buenos Aires under the flag of Religión o Muerte (Religion or Death) as a reaction to various anti-clerical laws passed by the president which aimed at creating a regalist national church independent from Rome, promoted the expropriation of clerical properties by the state, suppressed religious orders and granted religious tolerance to minorities. He overthrew the centralist governor of San Juan shortly after the central government signed a series of treaties with Great Britain by which religious freedom was enforced and La Rioja mines were given in usufruct to British enterprises. A devout catholic who would quote the Bible from memory, Quiroga considered Rivadavia a "persecutor of the Church" and joined federalist rebels who would later overthrow the national government.

After the Cisplatine war, the officers of the returning army (of centralist tendencies, known as unitarios) deposed the federalist governments in an attempt to restore the centralised rule of Buenos Aires. General José María Paz took over its province of Córdoba and his officers campaigned through the interior provinces. Quiroga tried to oppose them, but without success, and after defeat in the Battle of La Tablada, he went into self-imposed exile in Buenos Aires. From there, where the coup was quickly defeated, Quiroga led an army towards Córdoba but was defeated in the Battle of Oncativo by Paz's more disciplined forces. Quiroga decided not to give up and tried a more ambitious attempt, marching through territories still occupied by native aboriginals, in order to bypass Córdoba, and attack directly Mendoza, where it succeeded. He took his campaign north along the Andean provinces, until he finally defeated General Gregorio Aráoz de Lamadrid, who led the last remaining unitary forces, in Salta.

After the war, Quiroga established himself as one of the leaders of federalism in Argentina (along with Juan Manuel de Rosas and the caudillo of Santa Fe, Estanislao López), although he declared in his correspondence with Rosas that his ideas were in fact unitarian, but that he became a champion of federalism because people wanted federalism.

== Religious views ==
For most of the first years as a powerful caudillo, Facundo Quiroga had very little to say about his own personal religion, hoping to stay out of the conflict over control of the masses between Catholicism and the emerging Argentine government. In 1826, however, this shifted as one of Quiroga's key motives in his intervention in the civil wars was to come to the defense of Catholicism. He announced that he desired to stop the attacks on "the Catholic Apostolic Roman Religion, which Our Lord Jesus Christ constructed at the cost of much bitterness". While it remains mostly unclear what Quiroga's personal beliefs were, he publicly supported the Catholic faith hoping to move the church's support to the Federalist side in the wars against the Unitarians.

== Death ==
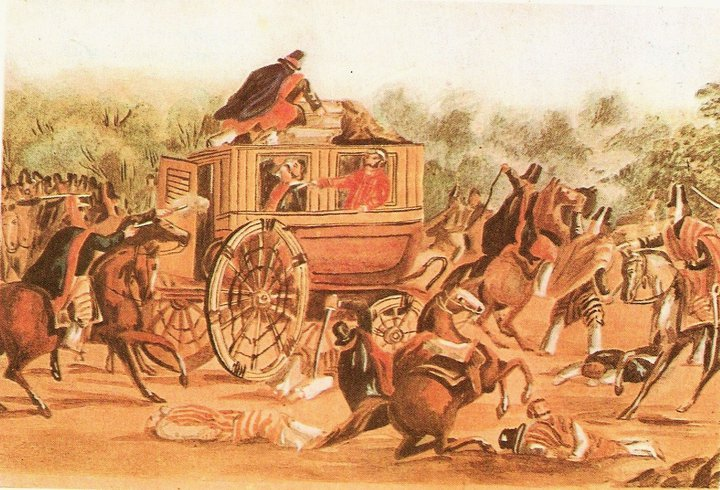
Death of Facundo Quiroga

In 1834, Quiroga was appointed by the governor of Buenos Aires (and Representative of Foreign Relations of the Argentine Confederation) Manuel Vicente Maza to mediate between the governors of Tucumán and Salta, but Salta governor De la Torre died before Quiroga could arrive. He was advised that there were plans to murder him on his way back, but Quiroga, disregarding the advice, returned to Buenos Aires through the same way. At Barranca Yaco, a watering place between Córdoba and Santiago del Estero, a party of gunmen ambushed the carriage in which he travelled. Quiroga, confident in his charisma and that his mere presence and resolution would discourage the attackers, appeared through the carriage door and shouted at the gunmen, asking for their commander to confront him. The leader of the party, Santos Pérez, however, did not take chances and killed Quiroga by shooting him through the left eye.

The political crime created a huge crisis in all the Confederation, forcing Maza to resign, and led to the establishment of Rosas' government. Rosas, as the Confederation leader, led the criminal investigation that ended with the prosecution of the governor of Córdoba, José Vicente Reynafé, and his brother as the intellectual perpetrators of the crime. They were hanged along with Santos Pérez in 1837 in Buenos Aires.

After Facundo's death, the execution of his will revealed that he never seized nor inherited any wealth or property from his father. Instead, Ariel de la Fuente states in his 2000 book Children of Facundo that he "accumulated his fortune during eighteen years of married life, a period that coincides, almost exactly, with his entire political career (1818–1835)". In addition, Facundo's family would inherit his properties in Buenos Aires, and all in all, his fortune would total to be around 200,000 pesos. This mass sum is attributed almost entirely as a result of his political career and not from his lifestyle as a caudillo rancher.

In 1845, Domingo F. Sarmiento wrote Facundo, Civilization and Barbarism, a book that reviews the influence of caudillo leaders, which he defines as "barbarism", in the Argentine political and social life, but also as a protest to Rosas' regime, and a call for European education and lifestyle. Sarmiento's Facundo was also expanded upon in a book titled Children of Facundo: Caudillo and Gaucho Insurgency During the Argentine State-Formation Process (La Rioja, 1853–1870), written by Ariel de la Fuente. De la Fuente argues that the struggles in La Rioja encompassed more than the upper-class divisions between Unitarian and Federalist, and he suggests viewing the conflicts from the perspective of the lower-class gauchos to see these differences. Children of Facundo further depicts Facundo as a complex leader. His relationship with the gauchos was presented as a double-edged sword, where the gauchos are responsible for the caudillo's notoriety, and the caudillo (Facundo) is responsible for the gauchos' supply of necessities. Quiroga is buried in La Recoleta Cemetery in Buenos Aires.

== In literature ==
Jorge Luis Borges wrote an imaginary dialogue between Quiroga and Rosas in Dead Men's Dialogue, in Dreamtigers.
