= Gregorio Aráoz de Lamadrid =

Argentine military officer

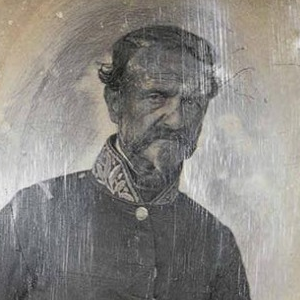
Gregorio Aráoz de Lamadrid, 1855

Comandante General Gregorio Aráoz de Lamadrid (or "de La Madrid"; 28 November 1795 in San Miguel de Tucumán – 5 January 1857 in Buenos Aires) was an Argentine military officer and briefly, governor of several provinces like Córdoba, Mendoza and his native province of Tucumán.

Lamadrid fought beside General Belgrano and General San Martín during the Argentine War of Independence, as a prominent cavalry officer of the Army of the North, where he won a number of famous small actions in Upper Peru such as Tambo Nuevo in 1813 and Culpina in 1816. As a general commanding Unitarian forces in the civil wars which followed, Lamadrid fought alongside General José María Paz in the battles of La Tablada, San Roque, and Oncativo.

Like many other nineteenth century Argentines prominent in public life, Lamadrid was a freemason.

Lamadrid's body is buried in the Cathedral of San Miguel de Tucumán.

The football club Club Atlético General Lamadrid of the Metropolitan 4th Division are named in his honour.

Political offices
Preceded by José María Paz	Governor of Córdoba; 1831 - 1831	Succeeded by Mariano Fragueiro
Preceded by José Francisco Álvarez	Governor of Mendoza; 1841 - 1841	Succeeded by Manuel López
