= 1916 Argentine general election =

- 2 April 1916
- Presidential election

300 members of the Electoral College 151 votes needed to win
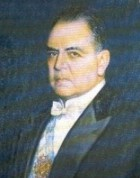

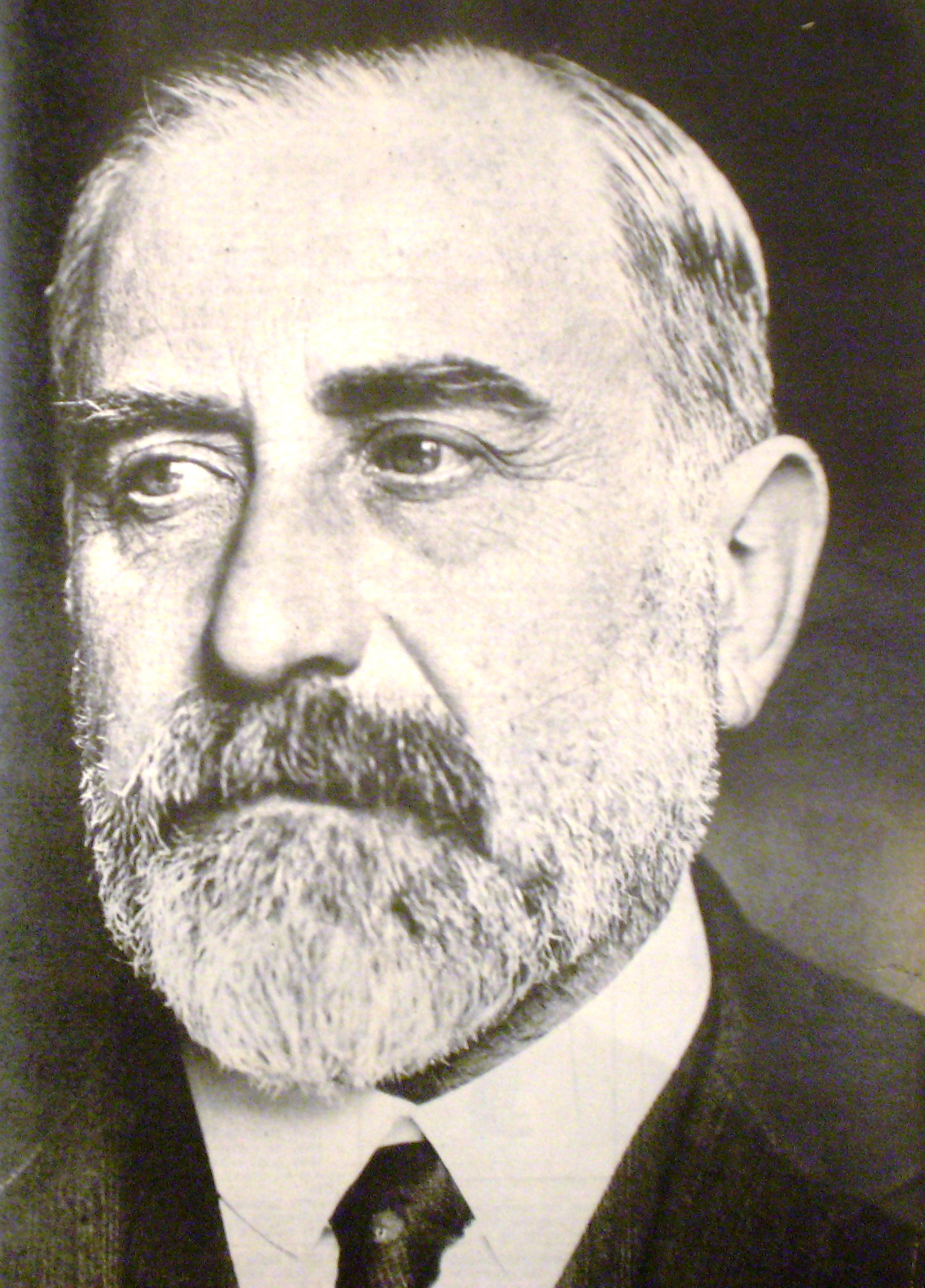
Nominee	Hipólito Yrigoyen	Ángel Rojas	Lisandro de la Torre
Party	UCR	Conservative	PDP
Electoral vote	152	104	20
Popular vote	340,802	150,245	135,308
Percentage	47.25%	20.83%	18.76
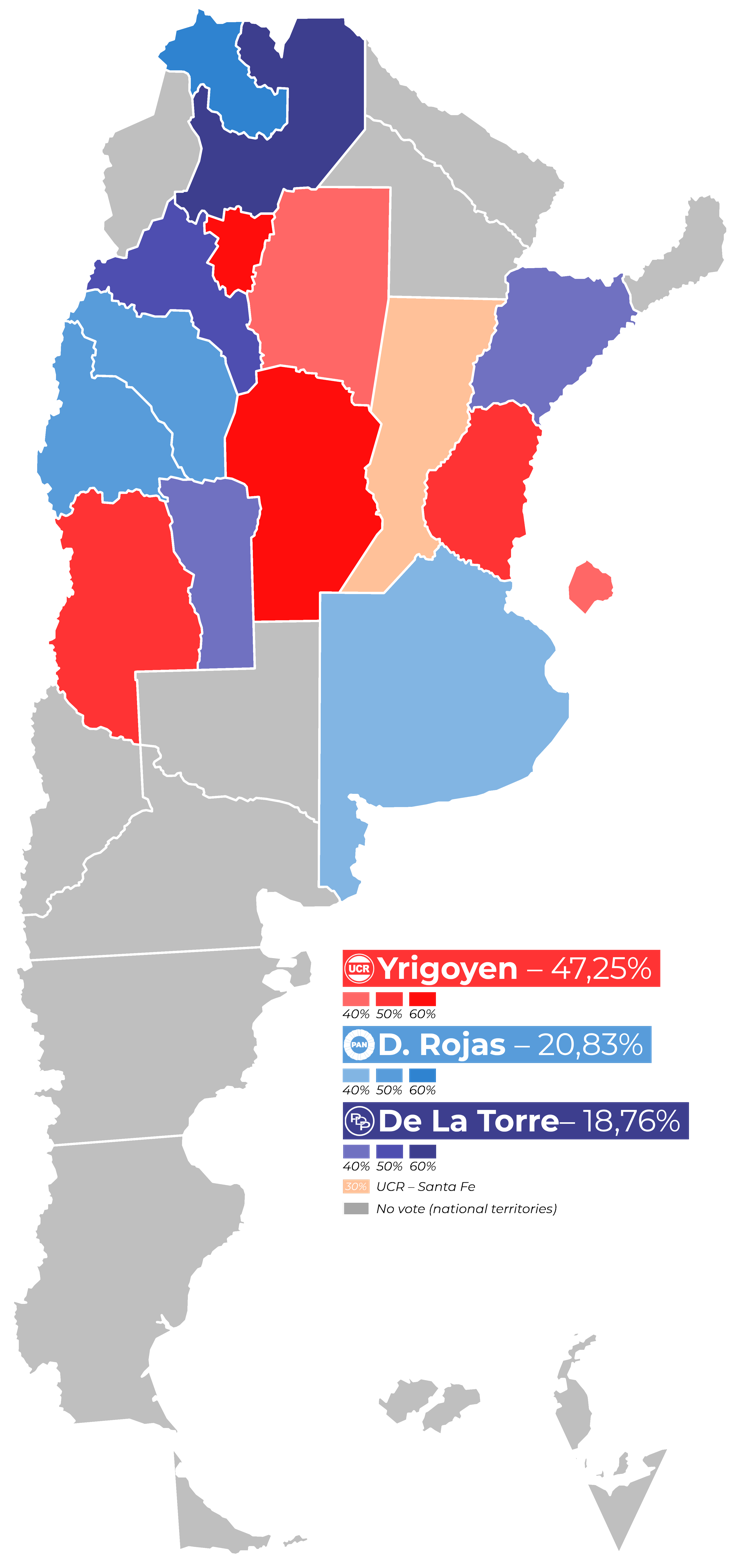
- Result by province
President before election
Victorino de la Plaza
PAN
Elected President
Hipólito Yrigoyen
UCR
- Chamber of Deputies
- 2 April 1916
- 62 of the 120 seats in the Chamber of Deputies
- Turnout: 65.59%
Party	Vote %	Seats	+/–
Radical Civic Union	44.76	26	+6
Conservative Concentration	24.78	18	−9
Democratic Progressive Party	9.77	7	+5
Socialist Party	7.23	3	−4
Dissident Radical Civic Union	3.85	4	+4
Liberal–Autonomist Pact	2.36	3	−2
This lists parties that won seats. See the complete results below.
Results by province

General elections were held in Argentina on 2 April 1916. Voters elected the President, legislators, and local officials. The first secret-ballot presidential elections in the nation's history, they were mandatory and had a turnout of 63%. The turnout for the Chamber of Deputies election was 65%.

The election has been characterized as the first free and fair elections in Argentina. The election, won by the Radical Civic Union (UCR), put an end to the six-decade long dominance of the National Autonomist Party in Argentine politics.

== Background ==
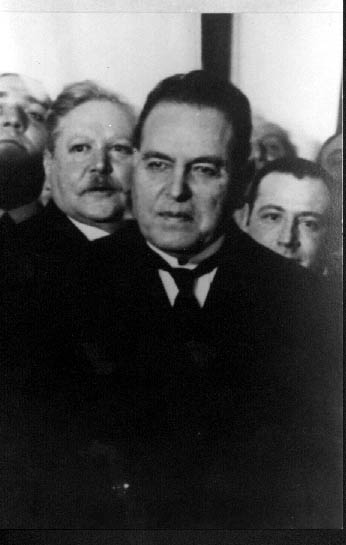
UCR leader Hipólito Yrigoyen greets supporters following his 1916 victory. His advocacy for free elections for over a generation resulted in Argentina's first pluralist government.

President Roque Sáenz Peña kept his word to the exiled leader of the Radical Civic Union (UCR), Hipólito Yrigoyen, who in turn abandoned his party's twenty-year-old boycott of elections. The president overcame nearly two years of conservative opposition in Congress (and pressure from his own social class) to pass in 1912 what was later known as the Sáenz Peña Law, which mandated universal male suffrage and the secret ballot. His health deteriorating quickly, the President lived to see the fruition of his reforms: the 1914 mid-term elections, which gave the UCR 19 out of the 60 Lower House seats in play (the ruling party obtained 10) and the governorship of Santa Fe Province (then the second-most important). Another beneficiary of the Sáenz Peña Law was the Socialist Party, led by Congressman Juan B. Justo. The formerly dominant PAN remained divided between the Conservative Party, led by the Governor of Buenos Aires Province, Marcelino Ugarte, and the Democratic Progressive Party, led by a reformist publisher and Congressman, Lisandro de la Torre.

Strengthened by both popular appeal and the fractiousness of its opposition, the UCR experienced dissent within from its Santa Fe Province chapter, whose endorsement Yrigoyen was unable to obtain. The Socialists lost one of its best-known lawmakers, Alfredo Palacios, who would run on a splinter Socialist ticket for several future elections. The Conservative Party's presumptive nominee, Governor Ugarte, stepped aside in favor of a lesser-known party figure, San Juan Province Governor Ángel Rojas, in a bid to attract votes from the hinterland and from moderates. President Victorino de la Plaza refused to interfere on behalf of the Conservatives (despite an assassination attempt that would have provided him with ample pretext). Refusing to back them, he fielded his own Provincial Party, which was limited mainly to his native Santiago del Estero Province. Faced with only token opposition from the remnants of the once-paramount PAN, Yrigoyen pledged to donate his salary to charity, if elected, and encouraged the rich country's impoverished majority to know him as "the father of the poor".

Election day, April 2, handed an unexpectedly large victory to Yrigoyen, who still had to await the results from the electoral college (which met in July). The dissident Santa Fe UCR had drained a significant number of electors from the official ticket, and Yrigoyen obtained but 133 of the body's 300 electors. Numerous Democratic Progressives, moreover, became faithless electors – pledging their support to the Conservative Party. Santa Fe's UCR, however, resorted to the same tactic, allowing Yrigoyen its 19 electors and making the patient activist for voter rights the first democratically elected President of Argentina.

== Candidates ==
- Radical Civic Union (populist): President of the UCR Hipólito Yrigoyen of the city of Buenos Aires
- Conservative Party (conservative): Governor Ángel Rojas of San Juan Province
- Democratic Progressive Party (reformist): Deputy Lisandro de la Torre of Santa Fe Province
- Socialist Party: Deputy Juan B. Justo of the city of Buenos Aires
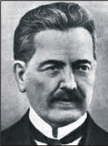
Yrigoyen

Rojas

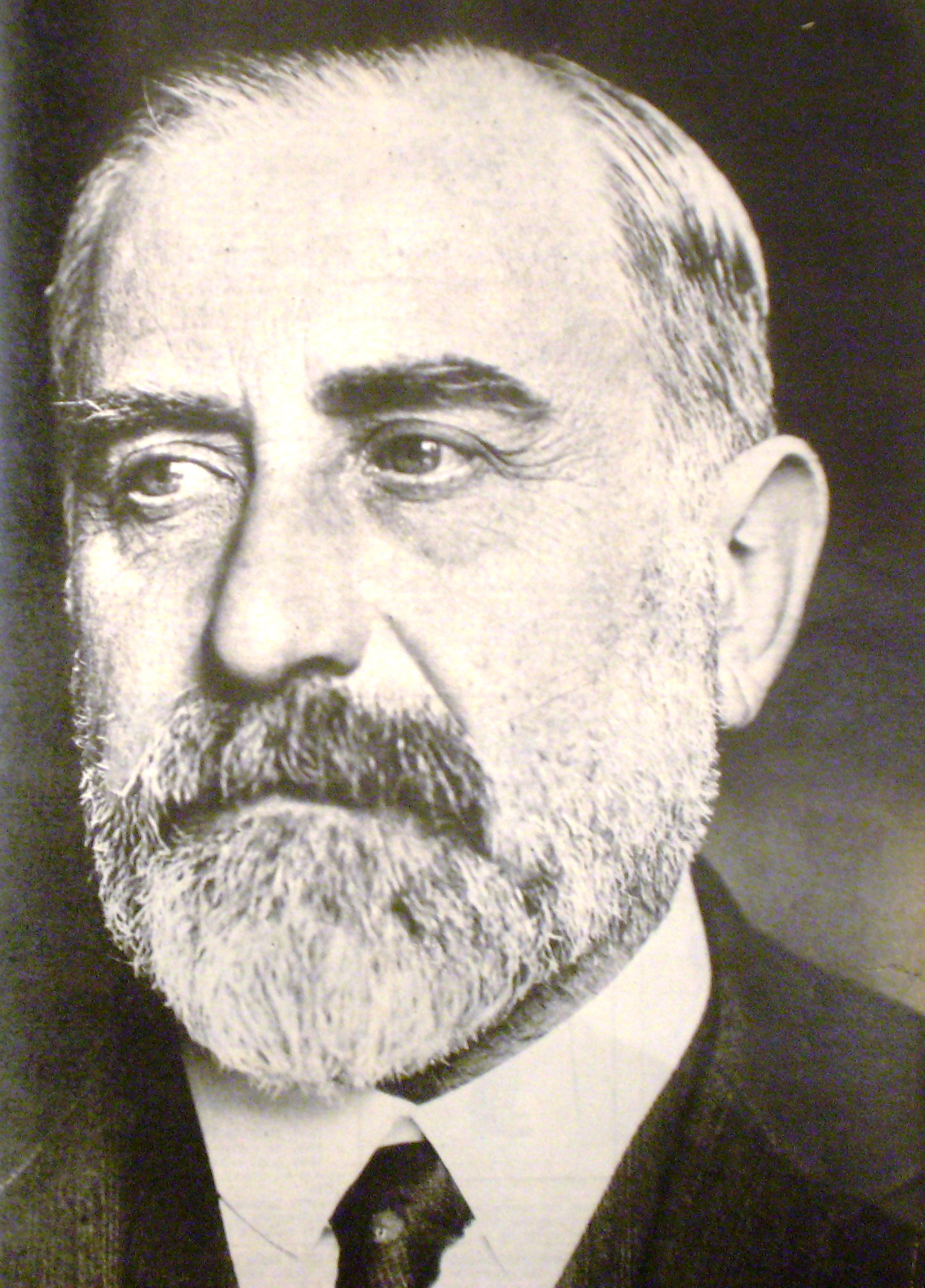
de la Torre

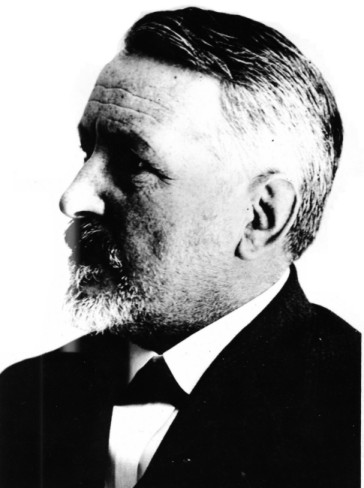
Justo

== Results ==
=== Electoral college ===
Candidate	Running mate	Party or alliance		Votes	%	Seats
Hipólito Yrigoyen	Pelagio Luna	Radical Civic Union		340,802	47.25	133
Ángel Dolores Rojas	Juan Eugenio Serú	Conservative; Concentration	Conservative Party	96,103	13.33	46
Ángel Dolores Rojas	Juan Eugenio Serú	Conservative; Concentration	Popular Party	16,141	2.24	7
Ángel Dolores Rojas	Juan Eugenio Serú	Conservative; Concentration	Democratic Union	13,921	1.93	4
Ángel Dolores Rojas	Juan Eugenio Serú	Conservative; Concentration	Autonomist Party of Corrientes	9,645	1.34	0
Ángel Dolores Rojas	Juan Eugenio Serú	Conservative; Concentration	Civic Concentration	9,170	1.27	7
Ángel Dolores Rojas	Juan Eugenio Serú	Conservative; Concentration	Provincial Party	5,265	0.73	6
Ángel Dolores Rojas	Juan Eugenio Serú	Conservative; Concentration	Total	150,245	20.83	70
Lisandro de la Torre	Alejandro Carbó	De la Torre–Carbó	Democratic Progressive Party	115,604	16.03	49
Lisandro de la Torre	Alejandro Carbó	De la Torre–Carbó	Provincial Union	10,909	1.51	8
Lisandro de la Torre	Alejandro Carbó	De la Torre–Carbó	Catamarca Concentration	8,795	1.22	7
Lisandro de la Torre	Alejandro Carbó	De la Torre–Carbó	Total	135,308	18.76	64
Juan B. Justo	Nicolás Repetto	Socialist Party		66,397	9.21	14
No candidate	No candidate	Dissident Radical Civic Union		28,116	3.90	19
No candidate	No candidate	Argentine Socialist Party		347	0.05	0
Total				721,215	100.00	300
Valid votes				721,215	96.49	
Invalid/blank votes				26,256	3.51	
Total votes				747,471	100.00	
Registered voters/turnout				1,189,254	62.85	

=== President ===
Candidate	Party	Votes	%
Hipólito Yrigoyen	Radical Civic Union	152	51.01
Ángel Dolores Rojas	Conservative Party	104	34.90
Lisandro de la Torre	Democratic Progressive Party	20	6.71
Juan B. Justo	Socialist Party	14	4.70
Alejandro Carbó	Democratic Progressive Party	8	2.68
Total		298	100.00
Registered voters/turnout		300	–

==== By province ====
Province	Yrigoyen	Rojas	de la Torre	Justo	Carbó
Buenos Aires City	30			14	
Buenos Aires	20	40			
Catamarca	3		7		
Córdoba	18	7			
Corrientes	6	12			
Entre Ríos	15	7			
Jujuy	2	6			
La Rioja	2	6			
Mendoza	8	4			
Salta	4	8			
San Juan	3	7			
San Luis		3	7		
Santa Fe	19				8
Santiago del Estero	10	4			
Tucumán	12		6		
Total	152	104	20	14	8
Source: Senate, Duhalde

=== Vice president ===
Candidate	Party	Votes	%
Pelagio Luna	Radical Civic Union	152	51.01
Juan Eugenio Serú	Conservative Party	103	34.56
Alejandro Carbó	Democratic Progressive Party	20	6.71
Nicolás Repetto	Socialist Party	14	4.70
Carlos Ibarguren	Democratic Progressive Party	8	2.68
Julio Argentino Pascual Roca	Conservative Party	1	0.34
Total		298	100.00
Registered voters/turnout		300	–

==== By province ====
Province	Luna	Serú	Carbó	Repetto	Ibarguren	Roca
Buenos Aires City	30			14		
Buenos Aires	20	40				
Catamarca	3		7			
Córdoba	18	7				
Corrientes	6	12				
Entre Ríos	15	7				
Jujuy	2	6				
La Rioja	2	6				
Mendoza	8	3				1
Salta	4	8				
San Juan	3	7				
San Luis	3	7				
Santa Fe	19				8	
Santiago del Estero	10	4				
Tucumán	12		6			
Total	152	103	20	14	8	1
Source: Senate Duhalde

=== Chamber of Deputies ===
Party or alliance		Votes	%	Seats	
Party or alliance		Votes	%	Won	Total
Radical Civic Union		339,296	44.76	26	47
Conservative Parties	Conservative Party	113,002	14.91	15	–
Conservative Parties	Popular Concentration	21,750	2.87	0	–
Conservative Parties	People's Party	16,664	2.20	0	–
Conservative Parties	Democratic Union	15,146	2.00	1	–
Conservative Parties	Provincial Union	11,339	1.50	2	–
Conservative Parties	Autonomist Party of Corrientes	9,911	1.31	0	–
Conservative Parties	Total	187,812	24.78	18	43
Democratic Progressive Party		74,061	9.77	7	9
Socialist Party		54,838	7.23	3	9
Argentine Socialist Party		34,052	4.49	0	0
Dissident Radical Civic Union		29,173	3.85	4	4
Liberal–Autonomist Pact		17,910	2.36	3	6
Unitarian Party		759	0.10	0	0
Others		20,163	2.66	0	1
Vacant				1	1
Total		758,064	100.00	62	120
Valid votes		758,064	98.19		
Invalid/blank votes		13,964	1.81		
Total votes		772,028	100.00		
Registered voters/turnout		1,189,254	64.92		
