= Ángel Dolores Rojas =

Argentine lawyer and politician (1851–1918)

Ángel Rojas

Governor of San Juan
- In office May 12, 1914 – June 20, 1916
- Vice Governor: César Aguilar; Pedro A. Garro
- Preceded by: Victorino Ortega
- Succeeded by: Pedro A. Garro

National Senator
- In office June 20, 1916 – December 16, 1918
- Constituency: San Juan

Personal details
- Born: August 2, 1851 San Juan, Argentina
- Died: December 16, 1918 (aged 67)
- Party: Concentración Cívica / Conservative
- Profession: Lawyer

Ángel Dolores Rojas (August 2, 1851 – December 16, 1918) was an Argentine lawyer and politician.

== Life and times ==
Rojas was born and raised in San Juan Province. The son of a prominent local family, he earned a law degree at the University of Buenos Aires in 1875. He returned to San Juan, serving as attorney for the Argentine Great Western Railway, the Transandine Railway, and the National Mortgage Bank. He also served as a defense attorney in the provincial juvenile courts and in the 1878 convention that approved a series of amendments to the San Juan Constitution.

He was elected to the Argentine Chamber of Deputies in 1879, and was appointed Economy Minister for San Juan Province by interim Governor Juan Luis Sarmiento during his 1881-84 term. He later served as Director of the National Patent Office and wrote numerous academic papers in subsequent decades, including a biographical sketch of Fray Justo de Santa María de Oro (1897), and Estudios de derecho procesal argentino (Studies on Due Process in Argentine Law), published in a Buenos Aires journal La Semana Médica, in 1911.

The first elections for governor in the agrarian Province of San Juan following the 1912 federal enactment of the Sáenz Peña Law (which guaranteed certain voter rights, such as the secret ballot and universal male suffrage) led to the establishment of the Civic Concentration (CC). A conservative party, the CC supported the national administration, which since 1874 had been controlled by the landowner-oriented National Autonomist Party (PAN). The CC nominated Rojas and running mate César Aguilar, who in elections held on January 4, 1914, wrested the Governor's post from the Popular Party (in power locally since 1907); Vice-Governor Aguilar died suddenly on August 5.

The presidential campaign season, which began during 1915, centered around the contest between the party whose activism had led to electoral reform, the Radical Civic Union (UCR), and those who supported the present regime. Following a schism in the party in 1908, the PAN itself had been replaced by the Conservative Party. Led by the powerful Governor of Buenos Aires Province, Marcelino Ugarte, the latter's power and position as Governor of the nation's largest province themselves, in turn, became a liability, and the party instead nominated Rojas for President, and Mendoza vintner Juan Serú, for Vice-President.

The popularity of the UCR nominee, Hipólito Yrigoyen, and serious shortages of goods and capital as a result of World War I both undermined the Conservatives, whose strategists counted on a deadlock in the electoral college to translate favorably for the Rojas-Serú ticket (such as deadlock would necessitate the election of the presidential by Congress, where Conservatives retained majorities). Ultimately, however, Yrigoyen secured a narrow majority in the college, and Rojas was defeated.

Following the 1916 election, he was elected to the Argentine Senate by the Provincial Legislature. Serving as the Civic Concentration's sole Senator, Ángel Rojas died in San Juan on December 16, 1918, at age 67.
