= Jorge Luis Lona =

Roman Catholic prelate (1935–2022)

His Excellency Jorge Luis Lona
- Bishop Emeritus of San Luis
- Archdiocese: San Juan de Cuyo
- Diocese: San Luis
- Installed: 6 June 2001
- Term ended: 22 February 2011
- Predecessor: Juan Rodolfo Laise
- Successor: Pedro Daniel Martínez Perea
- Previous post: Coadjutor Bishop of San Luis (2000–2001)

Orders
- Ordination: 20 December 1979 by Ildefonso Maria Sansierra Robla
- Consecration: 20 December 2000 by Santos Abril y Castelló

Personal details
- Born: 23 November 1935 Buenos Aires, Argentina
- Died: 19 August 2022 (aged 86) San Luis, Argentina

Jorge Luis Lona (23 November 1935 – 19 August 2022) was an Argentine Roman Catholic prelate.

Lona was born in Argentina and was ordained to the priesthood in 1979. He served as the coadjutor bishop of the Diocese of San Luis in 2000 and 2001 and as bishop of the diocese from 2001 until his retirement in 2011.

Catholic Church titles
Preceded by Juan Rodolfo Laise	Bishop of San Luis; 2001–2011	Succeeded by Pedro Daniel Martínez Perea
