= Diocese of San Luis =

Catholic ecclesiastical territory

Diocese of San Luis Dioecesis Sancti Ludovici in Argentina Diócesis de San Luis

Catholic
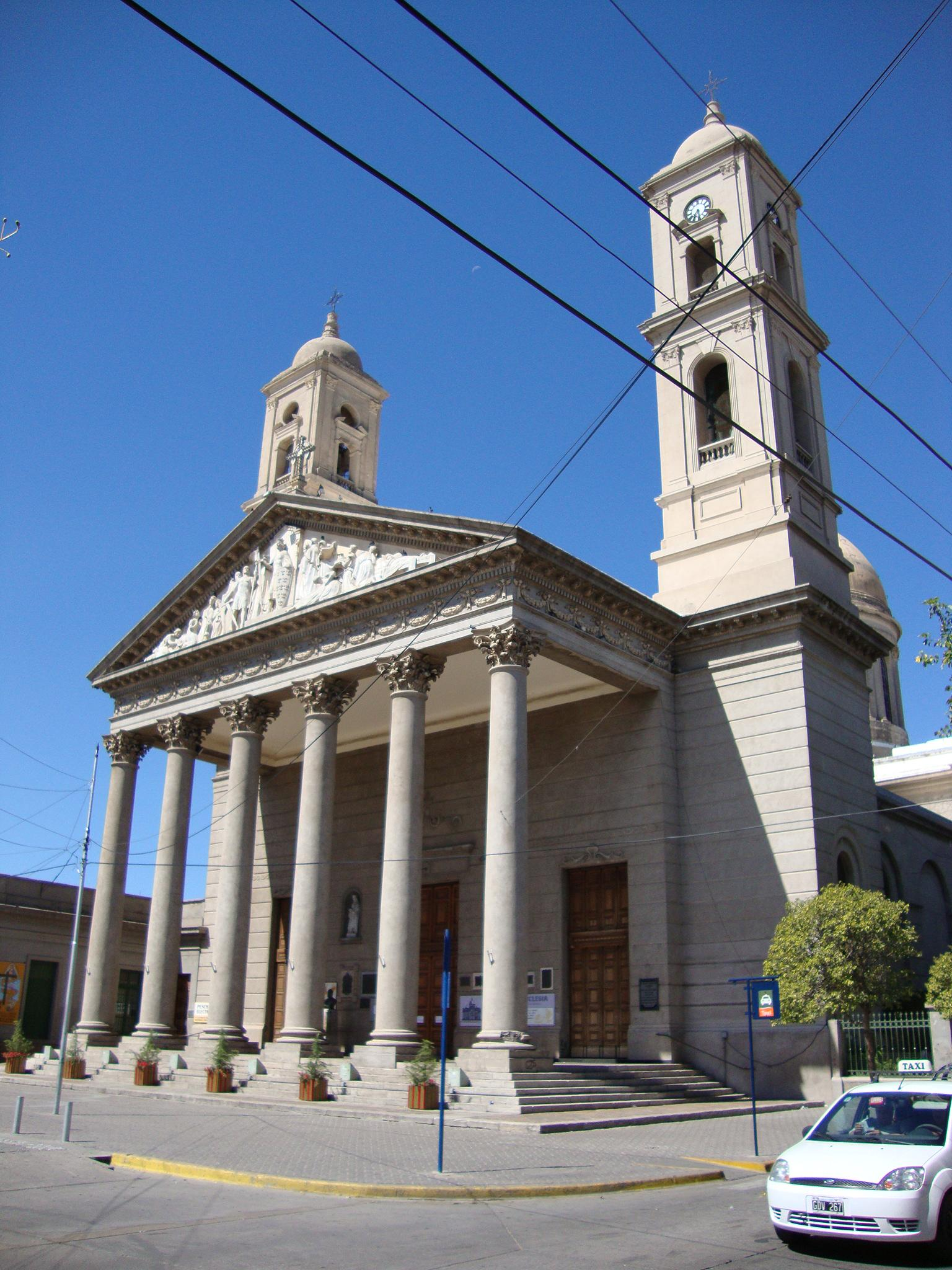
- Cathedral of the Immaculate Conception

Location
- Country: Argentina
- Ecclesiastical province: San Juan de Cuyo
- Metropolitan: San Juan de Cuyo

Statistics
- Area: 76,748 km^{2} (29,633 sq mi)
- Population: Total; Catholics: (as of 2010); 385,000; 365,000 (94.8%)
- Parishes: 47

Information
- Denomination: Roman Catholic
- Rite: Roman Rite
- Established: 20 April 1934 (92 years ago)
- Cathedral: Cathedral of the Immaculate Conception in San Luis
- Patron saint: St Louis IX

Current leadership
- Pope: Leo XIV
- Bishop: Gabriel Bernardo Barba
- Metropolitan Archbishop: Jorge Eduardo Lozano
- Bishops emeritus: Pedro Daniel Martinez Perea

The Roman Catholic Diocese of San Luis, is located in the city of San Luis, capital city of San Luis Province in the Cuyo region of Argentina.

== History ==
On 20 April 1934 Pope Pius XI founded the archdiocese as the Vicariate Apostolic of San Juan de Cuyo from territory taken from the Diocese of San Juan de Cuyo.

== Bishops ==
=== Ordinaries ===
- Pedro Dionisio Tibiletti (1934–1945)
- Emilio Antonio di Pasquo (1946–1961), appointed Bishop of Avellaneda
- Carlos María Cafferata (1961–1971)
- Juan Rodolfo Laise O.F.M.Cap. (1971–2001)
- Jorge Luis Lona (2001 – February 22, 2011)
- Pedro Daniel Martinez Perea (February 22, 2011 – June 9, 2020); previously, had been Coadjutor Bishop
- Gabriel Bernardo Barba (June 9, 2020 -

=== Coadjutor bishops ===
- Juan Rodolfo Laise, O.F.M.Cap. (1971)
- Jorge Luis Lona (2000-2001)
- Pedro Daniel Martínez Perea (2009-2011)
