= Juan Rodolfo Laise =

Argentine Catholic bishop (1926–2019)

Juan Rodolfo Laise OFM Cap
- Bishop of San Luis
- Church: Catholic Church
- Diocese: Diocese of San Luis
- In office: 6 July 1971 – 6 June 2001
- Predecessor: Carlos María Cafferata
- Successor: Jorge Luis Lona
- Previous posts: Titular Bishop of Iomnium (1971); Coadjutor Bishop of San Luis (1971)

Orders
- Ordination: 4 September 1949 by Miguel de Andrea
- Consecration: 29 May 1971 by Juan Carlos Aramburu

Personal details
- Born: 22 February 1926 Buenos Aires, Argentina
- Died: 22 July 2019 (aged 93) San Giovanni Rotondo, Apulia, Italy

Juan Rodolfo Laise OFM Cap (22 February 1926 – 22 July 2019) was an Argentine Catholic bishop.

Rodolfo Laise was born in Argentina and was ordained to the priesthood in 1949. He was appointed titular bishop of Iomnium and coadjutor bishop of the San Luis, Argentina, in 1971. He then served as bishop of the diocese from 1971 until Pope John Paul II accepted his resignation for reasons of age on 6 June 2001.
