= Alfonso Delgado Evers =

Argentine Roman Catholic archbishop (born 1942)

- Archbishop Emeritus of San Juan de Cuyo
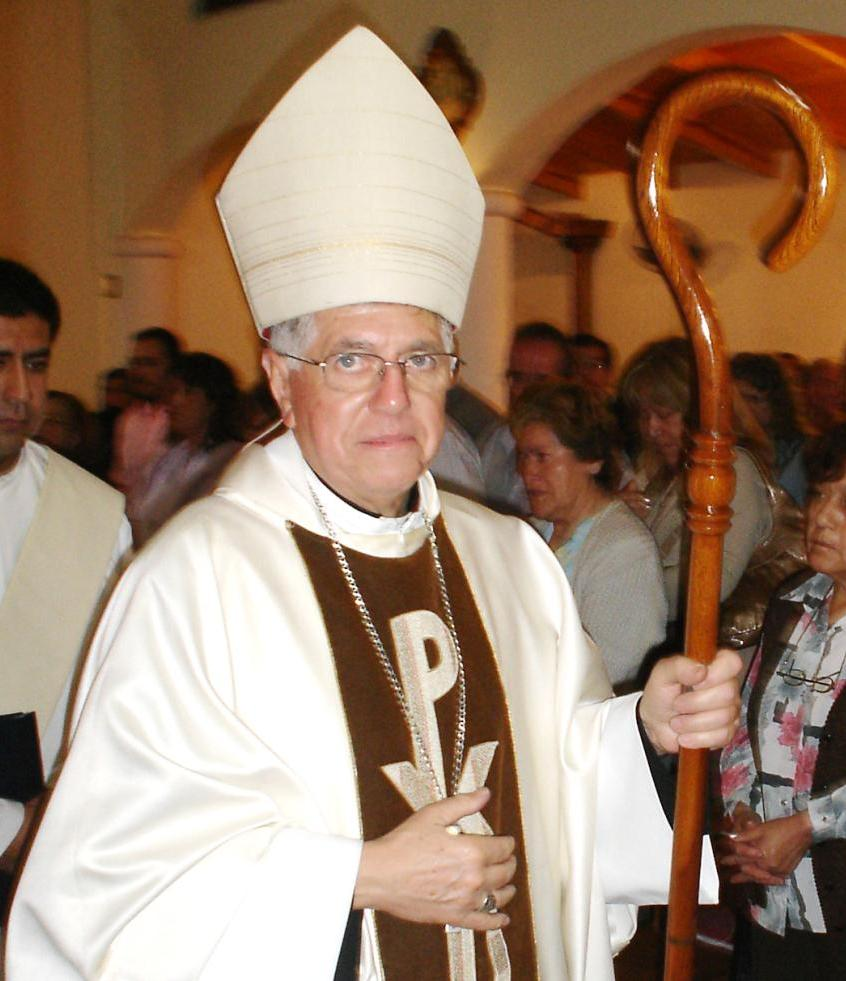
- Evers in 2015
- Church: Catholic Church
- Archdiocese: Archdiocese of San Juan de Cuyo
- In office: 29 March 2000 – 17 June 2017
- Predecessor: Ítalo Severino Di Stéfano
- Successor: Jorge Eduardo Lozano
- Previous posts: Bishop of Posadas (1994-2000); Bishop of Santo Tomé (1986-1994)

Orders
- Ordination: 23 June 1970
- Consecration: 25 April 1986 by Juan Carlos Aramburu

Personal details
- Born: 21 June 1942 (age 83) Rosario, Santa Fe Province, Argentina

Alfonso Delgado Evers (born 21 June 1942) is an Argentinian prelate of the Catholic Church. He was the Archbishop of San Juan de Cuyo from 2000 to 2017.

== Early life and education ==
Evers was born in Rosario, Argentina. He attended the National University of Rosario and graduated as a surveyor. He earned a doctorate in dogmatic theology from the University of Navarra in Spain.

== Church career ==
Evers was ordained a priest to the Prelature of Opus Dei on 23 June 1970 in Spain by Luigi Dadaglio, the Apostolic Nuncio to Spain. He was appointed Bishop of Santo Tomé on 20 March 1986 by Pope John Paul II and was consecrated a bishop on 25 April 1986 by Cardinal Juan Carlos Aramburu in Buenos Aires.

He was transferred to Posadas on February 25, 1994. He was installed there on May 1, 1994.

On 29 March 2000, he was made Archbishop of San Juan de Cuyo. He was installed there on May 24, 2000.

Pope Francis accepted his resignation on 17 June 2017.
