= San Juan de Cuyo Cathedral =

Coordinates: 31.5369°S 68.5264°W

San Juan Cathedral
- Cathedral of St John the Baptist, San Juan
- Catedral de San Juan Bautista
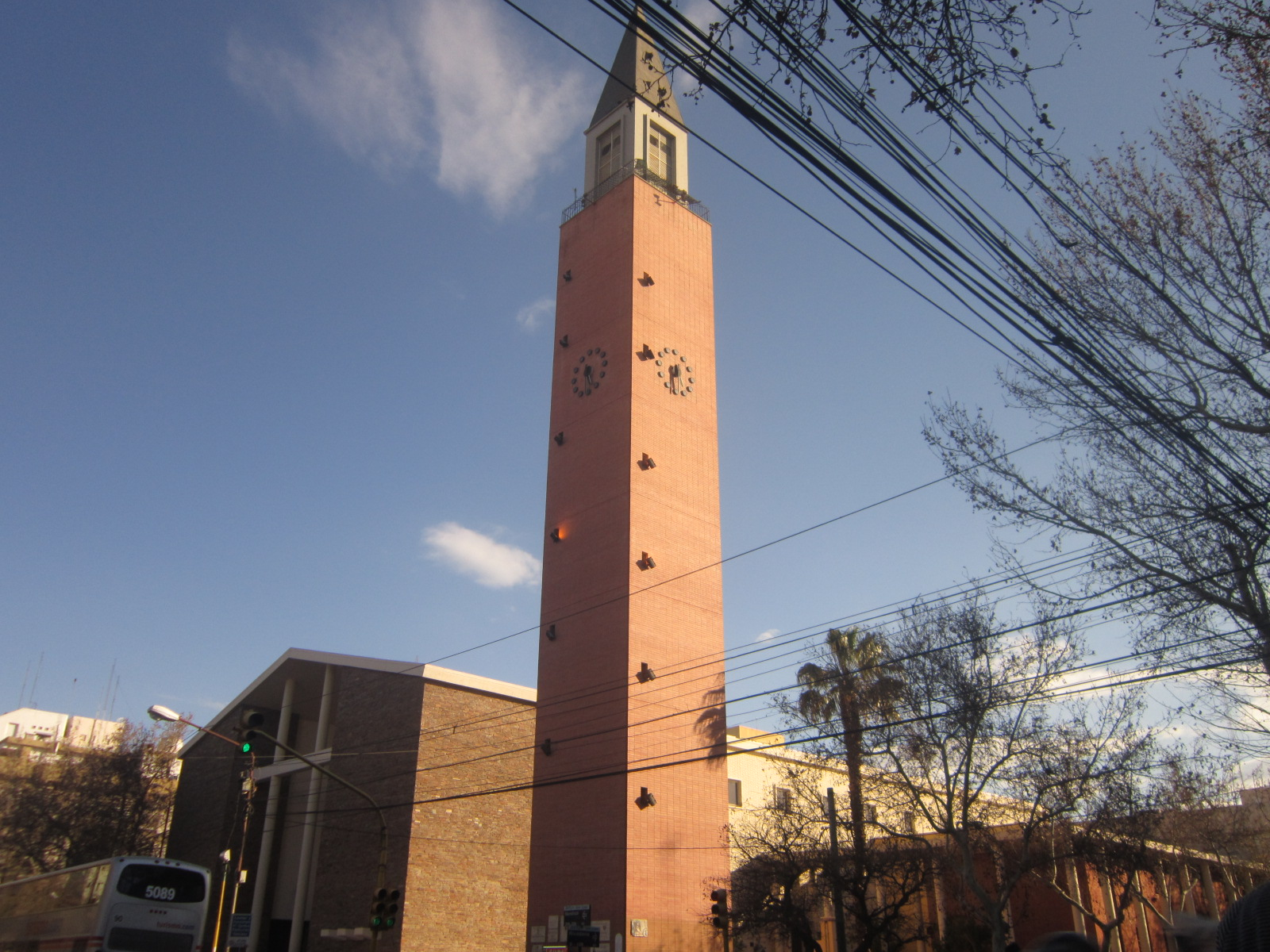
- San Juan Cathedral
- Location: San Juan
- Country: Argentina
- Denomination: Roman Catholic Church

San Juan Cathedral (Spanish: Catedral de San Juan Bautista), dedicated to Saint John the Baptist, is a cathedral and parish of the Roman Catholic Church in San Juan, Argentina. It is the seat of the metropolitan bishop of the Roman Catholic Archdiocese of San Juan de Cuyo.

It is currently one of the most modern cathedrals in the country, consecrated on December 16, 1979. It was designed by architects Daniel Ramos Correas and Carlos Enrique Vallhonrat. The cathedral complex is located on the same footprint as the original cathedral building, built by the Society of Jesus in 1712 and used until damaged in the 1944 earthquake that struck San Juan Province.

== See also ==
- Catholic Church in Argentina
