= José Manuel Quiroga Sarmiento =

Argentine priest

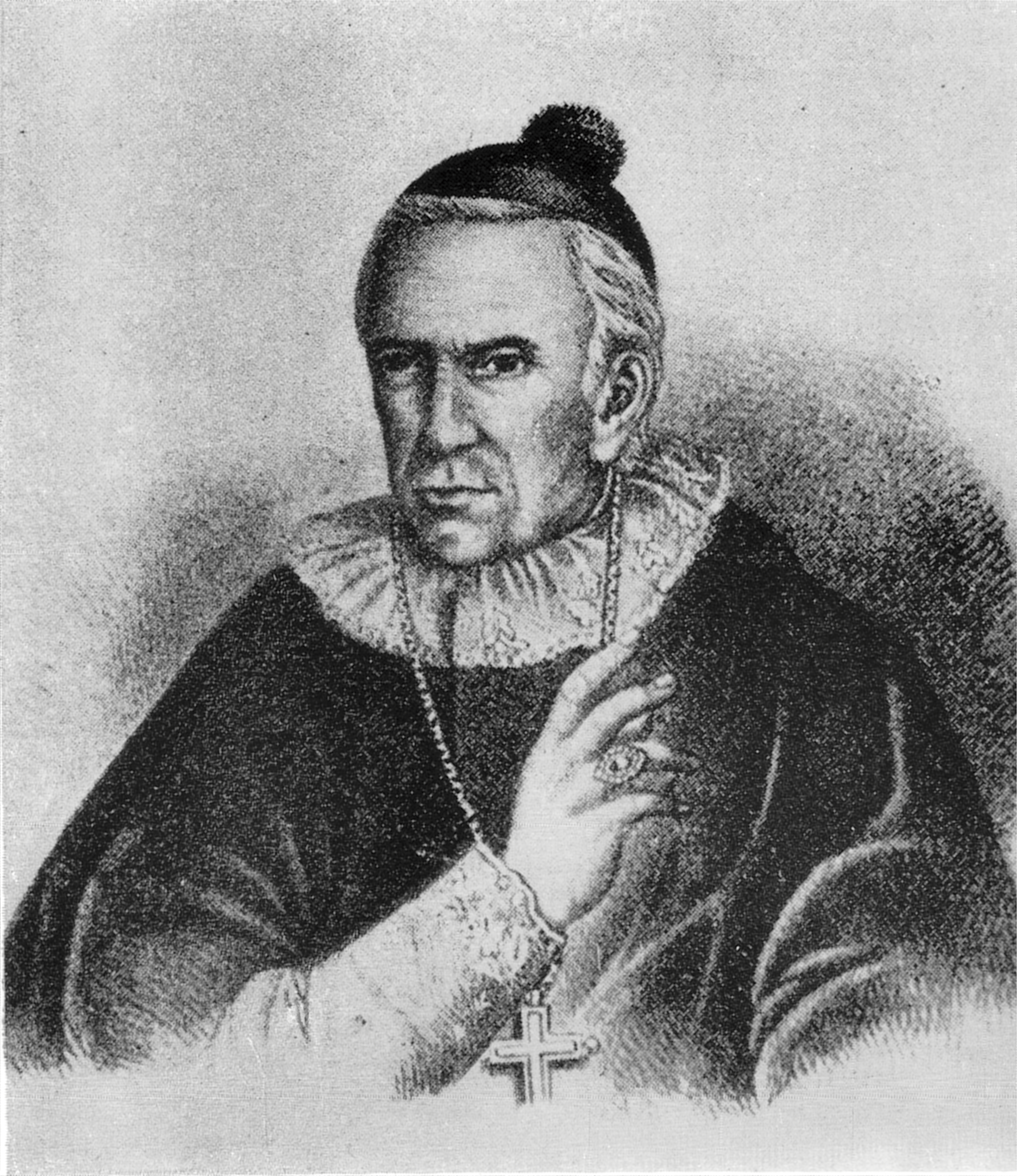
- Jose Manuel Quiroga Sarmiento

Bishop of San Juan de Cuyo
- In office 29 March 1840 – 25 January 1852
- Preceded by: Justo de Santa María de Oro
- Succeeded by: Nicolás Aldazor

Governor of San Juan Province, Argentina
- In office 11 September 1842 – 8 October 1842
- Preceded by: Mariano Acha
- Succeeded by: Nazario Benavídez

Personal details
- Born: José Manuel Eufrasio Quiroga Sarmiento y Funes; 1 June 1777 San Juan, Argentina
- Died: 25 January 1852 (aged 74) San Juan, Argentina
- Occupation: Priest

José Manuel Eufrasio Quiroga Sarmiento y Funes (1 June 1777 - 25 January 1852) was an Argentine priest who became Bishop of San Juan de Cuyo. While in that position, he was briefly Governor of San Juan Province, Argentina.

José Manuel Eufrasio Quiroga Sarmiento y Funes was born on 1 June 1777 in San Juan, Argentina, the capital of San Juan Province. His father was José Ignacio de Quiroga Sarmiento Acosta, and his mother was Juana Isabel Funes Morales de Albornoz. He was ordained as a priest in San Juan in 1800. He was appointed Rector of the Matriz Church in 1815. He worked to restore the church, and a second tower was added in 1824. He was active in local politics, and in 1820 supported the autonomy of San Juan. In 1827 he was a member of the council that elected Lieutenant Colonel Manuel Quiroga del Carril as provincial governor.

On 5 May 1835 he was elected dean of the San Juan Cathedral. In accordance with the will of his predecessor, Bishop Justo de Santa María de Oro, he was consecrated as Bishop on 29 March 1840. Between 11 September and 8 October 1842 he was also acting governor of San Juan after the Unitarian General Mariano Acha had been captured, but the Federalist General Nazario Benavídez had not yet returned to office. He died on 25 January 1852 in San Juan.
