= Hipólito Yrigoyen =

President of Argentina (1916–1922, 1928–1930)

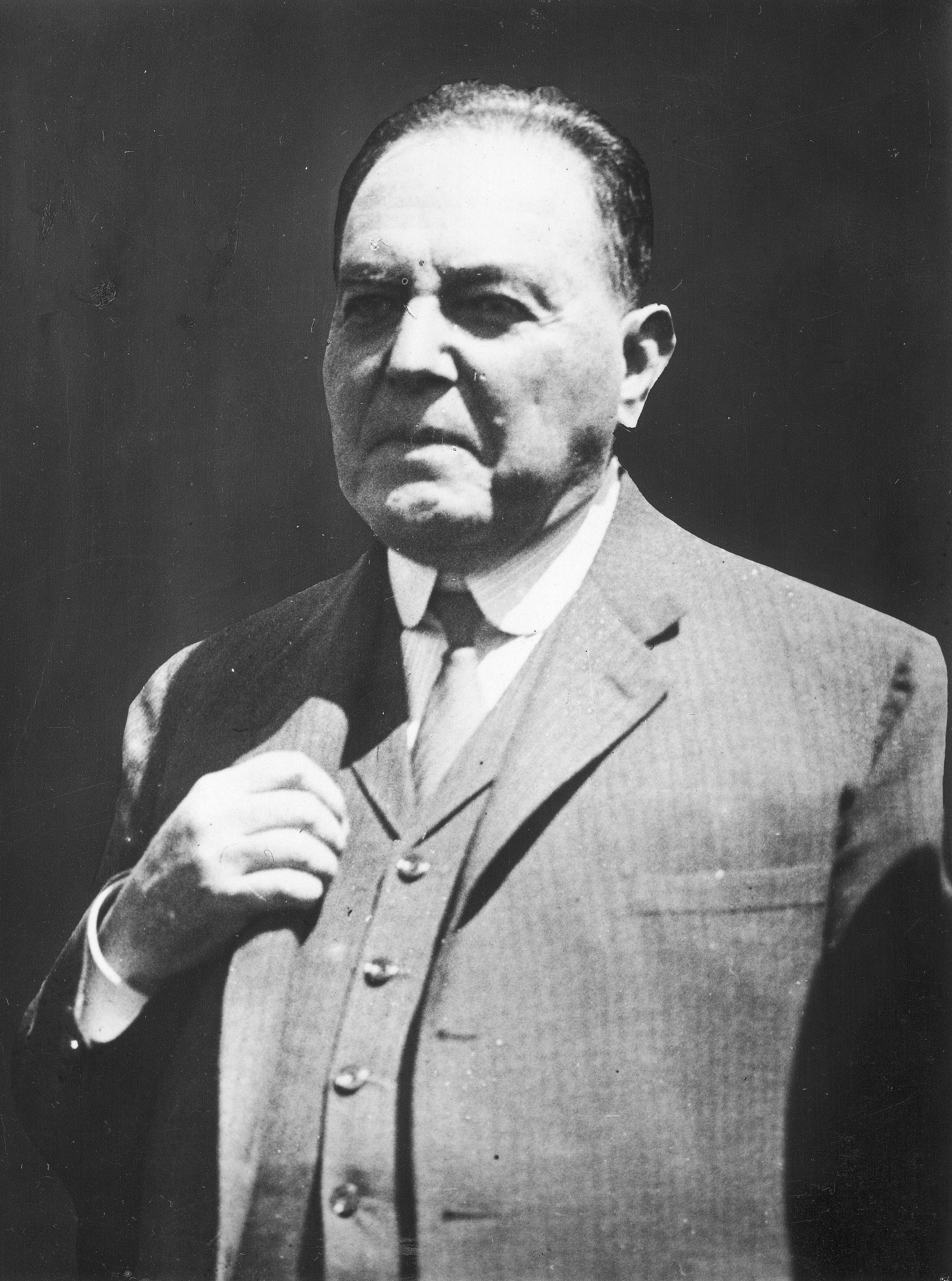
- Yrigoyen, c. 1920s

19th & 21st President of Argentina
- In office 12 October 1928 – 6 September 1930
- Vice President: Enrique Martínez
- Preceded by: Marcelo Torcuato de Alvear
- Succeeded by: José Félix Uriburu (de facto)
- In office 12 October 1916 – 11 October 1922
- Vice President: Pelagio Luna
- Preceded by: Victorino de la Plaza
- Succeeded by: Marcelo Torcuato de Alvear

Personal details
- Born: 12 July 1852 Buenos Aires, Argentina
- Died: 3 July 1933 (aged 80) Buenos Aires, Argentina
- Resting place: La Recoleta Cemetery
- Party: Radical Civic Union (1891–1933)
- Other party: Civic Union (1890–1891)

Juan Hipólito del Sagrado Corazón de Jesús Yrigoyen (Note: Spanish pronunciation: [iˈpolito iɾiˈɣoʝen]) (12 July 1852 – 3 July 1933) was an Argentine politician of the Radical Civic Union who served as President of Argentina from 1916 to 1922 and again from 1928 until his overthrow in 1930. He was the first president elected democratically by means of the secret ballot and mandatory male suffrage established by the Sáenz Peña Law of 1912. His activism was the prime impetus behind the passage of that law in Argentina.

Known as "the father of the poor", Yrigoyen presided over a rise in the standard of living of Argentina's working class together with the passage of a number of progressive social reforms, including improvements in factory conditions, regulation of working hours, compulsory pensions, and the introduction of a universally accessible public education system. Yrigoyen was the first nationalist president, convinced that the country had to manage its own currency and, above all, should have control of its transportation, energy and oil exploitation networks.

Between the 1916 general election and the 1930 coup d'état, political polarization was on the rise. Personalist radicalism was presented as the "authentic expression of the nation and the people" against the "oligarchic and conservative regime". For the ruling party, the will of the majorities prevailed over the division of powers. The opposition, on the other hand, accused the Executive Branch of being arrogant and demanded greater participation from Congress, especially in matters such as the contentious federal interventions.

== Early life ==
Juan Hipólito del Sagrado Corazón de Jesús Yrigoyen was born on 12 July 1852, a few months after the Battle of Caseros. He was baptized four years later, on 19 October 1856 in the church of Nuestra Señora de Piedad.

His father, Martín Yrigoyen Dodagaray, was a Basque-French immigrant who in 1847 married Marcelina Alén Ponce, daughter of Leandro Antonio Alén (who was also the father of Leandro N. Alem), a member of the Mazorca during the government of Juan Manuel de Rosas who would be shot and hanged in the Plaza de Mayo.

According to researcher Roberto Etchepareborda, his original last name – as opposed to Bernardo de Irigoyen – was Hirigoyen, Hirigoien in Standard Basque, which means "city of the high". In the French Basque country, the "h" is pronounced as it is in English, while in the Spanish Basque country, it is not pronounced, which is why the surname Hirigoyen probably has its origin in France, while its variants (Yrigoyen and Irigoyen) have their origins in Spain. Formerly, Spanish orthography used ⟨Y⟩ for uppercase ⟨I⟩.

The radical leader used "Yrigoyen" and "Irigoyen" interchangeably. The later preference for "Yrigoyen" was a political tool used in the 1920s. Gabriel del Mazo, leader of the Fuerza de Orientación Radical de la Joven Argentina (FORJA), recommended he use "Yrigoyen" as opposed to "Irigoyen", which Marcelo Torcuato de Alvear's sectors used.

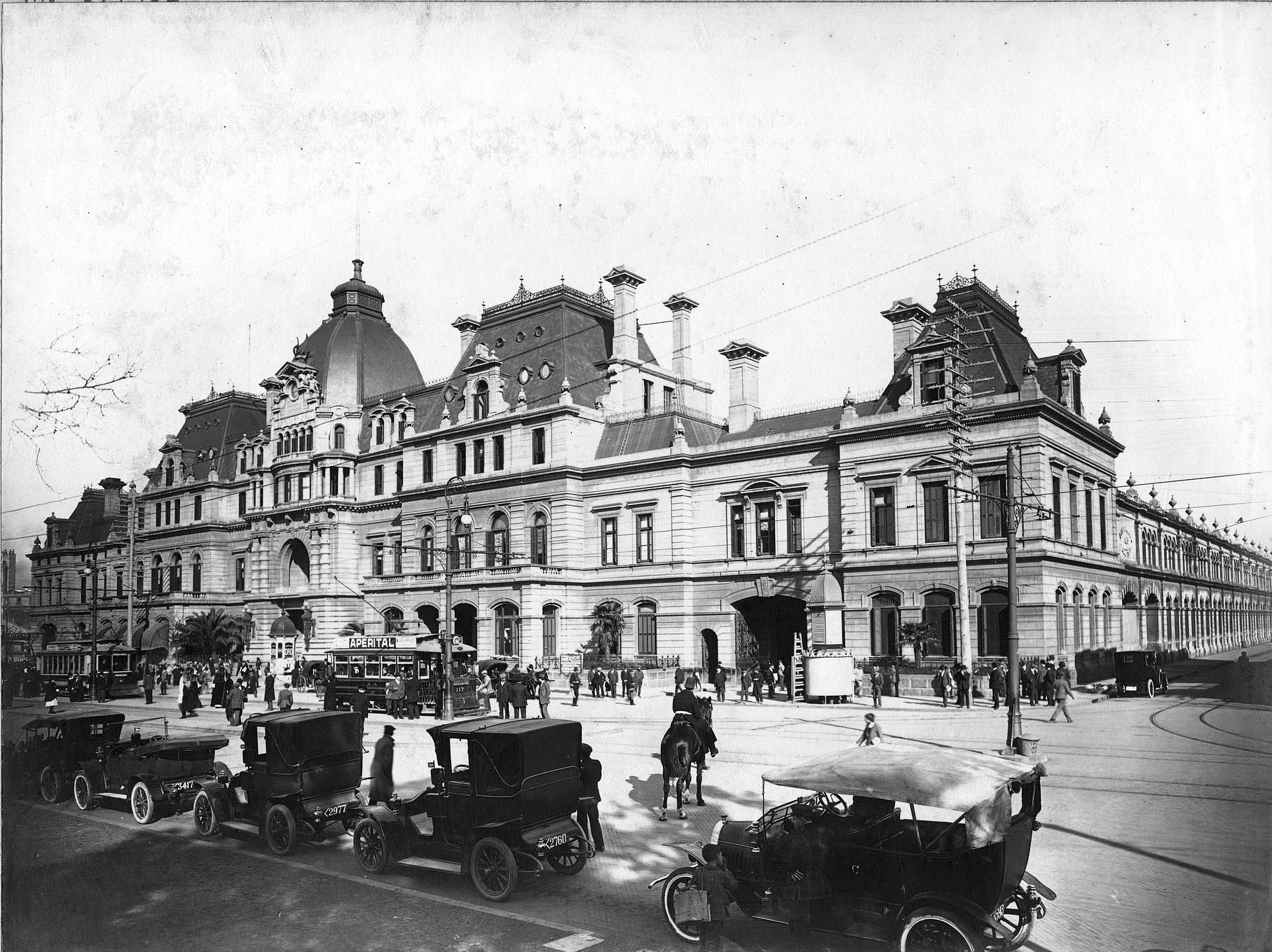
Plaza Constitución railway station in 1920. Yrigoyen lived on the nearby Avenida Brasil until his death in 1933. Years later, his house was demolished to make way for the Arturo Frondizi Highway.

During his youth, Yrigoyen lived in a house in the neighborhood of Balvanera and had four siblings: Roque, Martín, Amalia, and Marcelina. In 1861, at the age of nine, he entered the San José of Buenos Aires School, run by the Congregation of the Sacred Heart of Jesus of Betharram, although he continued his studies at the School of South America, where his uncle Leandro N. Alem was a professor of philosophy. Yrigoyen was not a standout student, though he did demonstrate an introspective personality. Early on, he had an inclination towards studying to be a priest, though he soon began to study law instead. For some time, Yrigoyen and Alem shared a household, and the latter tried to introduce his nephew to Freemasonry.

At fifteen years old, Yrigoyen paused his studies to help his father, who had acquired a fleet of trolleys to work in the port. He worked for a short time in a store and also had a job in the trolley. At his young age, he had already had extensive though diverse work experience.

In 1867, he worked at a judicial office that Leandro Alem and Aristóbulo del Valle shared.

== Early political career ==
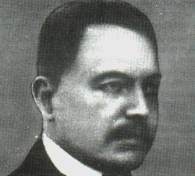
Hipólito Yrigoyen in 1893

When he finished his secondary education in 1869, he began his political life as a member, along with his uncle Leandro N. Alem, of the Autonomist Party, led by Adolfo Alsina, a party with a popular base that faced off against the National Party of Bartolomé Mitre. In his participation in the Electoral Club, he demanded free suffrage, division of rural property, and reform of the judicial power, among other measures.

In 1870, he entered public administration as a scribe for the General Accounts of the Office of Balances and Information, though he did not remain at this job for very long. Two years later, when Alem was elected provincial deputy, Yrigoyen, twenty years old, was named Police Commissioner of Balvanera thanks to the influence of his uncle, and placed in charge of Section 14. Meanwhile, he continued his studies in law and in March 1874 finished his fourth year, while also participating in the revolution that took place that year led by Bartolomé Mitre.

In 1877, Alem, Artistóbulo del Valle, and Yrigoyen, in protest of Adolfo Alsina's attitude towards Mitre's party, formed the Republican Party, which proposed del Valle as a candidate and positioned itself in opposition to any agreements between leaders of Alsina's party and Mitre's group. The internal conflict ended with the expulsion of Yrigoyen from his police duties in 1877. In 1878, at 25 years old, he was elected Provincial Deputy for the Republican Party and sat on the Budget Committee, but his term ended in 1880 as a result of the Federalization of Buenos Aires. That year he was named general administrator of Stamps and Patents, though he did not remain long in that position either. Upon the federalization of Buenos Aires and the ascent of Julio A. Roca to the presidency, Alem resigned from his position as Deputy in protest against the federalization and abandoned politics, allowing Yrigoyen, who was not opposed to the new law, to be elected Deputy to the National Congress. This was the first discrepancy that emerged between the two.

In 1878, he ended his studies, having never completed his thesis. Three years later, a new law was passed that eliminated the requirement for a thesis to become a lawyer in such a way that Yrigoyen was able to graduate.

He began to work as a professor of Argentina history, civic instruction, and philosophy in 1880 at the Normal School for Teachers, though he was first named President of the Balvanera School Council by Domingo Faustino Sarmiento, then president of the National Council of Education. He taught these subjects for around twenty-four years, until he was expelled by President Manuel Quintana as a result of the Revolution of 1905, led by Yrigoyen. Despite the unfavorable economic situation, he donated his salary of 150 pesos to the Children's Hospital and the Asylum for Defenseless Children. Testimonies from the time indicate that he was not a good professor, but his method is of particular interest: he gave his own students responsibility over the classes while he acted as a moderator and observer.

By 1882, Yrigoyen had finished his classes in theory at the University of Buenos Aires Law School. At this time, through the Spanish Krausists Julián Sanz del Río and Francisco Giner de los Ríos, he discovered the works of philosopher Karl Krause, who influenced his thinking considerably.

Ruins of Las Flores estancia, nearby one of Yrigoyen's properties

During the 1880s, he began a series of rural projects that would give him great wealth. He purchased and rented estancias in the provinces of Buenos Aires, Córdoba, and San Luis, and fattened cattle to sell them to refrigeration businesses. These activities not only earned him great wealth, but also landholdings of his own. In total he owned almost 25 leagues of land. He was the owner of Estancia El Trigo, near Las Flores, one of the best shepherding lands in the country; Seña de Anchorena in the province of San Luis; and El Quemado, near General Alvear. Thanks to his business experience, Yrigoyen had direct contact with the people of the countryside – both creoles and gringos – and he became familiar with their problems and sentiments. In a few years, Yrigoyen had accumulated a considerable fortune, which was to help him achieve his political aspirations.

Yrigoyen never hosted anyone, not even his friends, at his estancias. He spent time working in the fields alongside his workers, and in his free time he would walk or read. When he became a more popular political personality, he would retreat to his estancias to rest. He advised his workers to buy small properties for their old age. The workers at Yrigoyen's estancias received higher salaries than was typical for the time, and they received a share of the earnings, in proportion to the work and responsibility of each employee, and he would regularly give his workers articles of clothing. He collected a fortune of several million pesos, which he used almost entirely to fund his political activity, to the point that he was in debt when he died.

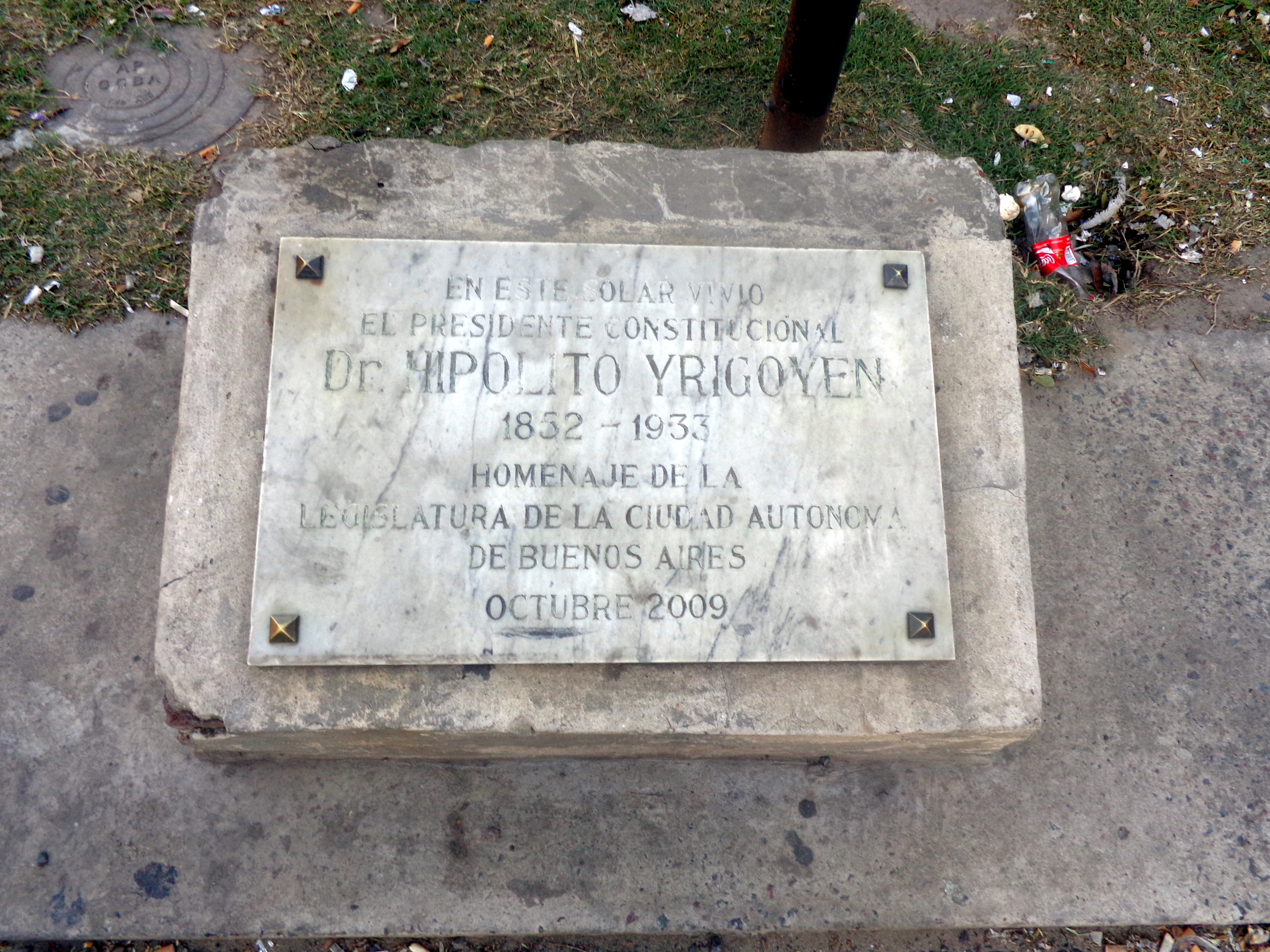
Plaque in the Constitución neighborhood of Buenos Aires, where Yrigoyen's house was located

The 1880s marked the consolidation of a landowning elite and commercial sector, tied together in a balance guaranteed by President Roca, first from within the government, and later from outside. The agreement between these distinct dominant sectors brought about the exclusion of any organized opposition. In this context, the opposition formed a new party, dissolving the Civic Union of the Youth and forming the new Civic Union in 1890, emerging from a heterogeneous movement linked together by the ideology of suffragism and the fight against Roca's regime. Following the success of the meeting held in the Florida Garden on 1 September 1889, which helped popularize Leandro N. Alem among the youth of Buenos Aires, and though he was retired from political life since the 1880s, he helped plan the Revolution of the Park.

Yrigoyen hesitated to join the movement at first since he believed the fight was not against a person (President Miguel Juárez Celman), but rather against a whole system. But prior to the revolution of 1890, he was pressured to join the movement and quickly became the Chief of Police of the Provisional Government. But the movement would be quickly repressed by the government, and the pacts between the more conservative factions of the Civic Union collapsed due to a deep internal crisis. This led to the rupture of the Civic Union on 26 June 1891, forming two new parties: the National Civic Union, led by Bartolomé Mitre and in favor of negotiating with Roca's party, and the Radical Civic Union (Unión Civica Radical, UCR), led by Alem and radically opposed to Roca. That same year, Yrigoyen was named head of the Radical Committee of the Province of Buenos Aires, and in March 1881, he was named head of the Department of Argentine History Civic Instruction at the Normal School for Teachers. The five-year stint at this position influenced Yrigoyen notably, giving him a more global vision.

In 1889, Yrigoyen moved into a house of his own, facing what is today Plaza Congreso in the City of Buenos Aires, on the street that is now named after him, on the 1600 block. Just prior to this move, his brother, Roque, died after suffering a long illness. That event prompted him to close himself off to the world even more, a state in which he suffered a religious crisis. Little is known about this, due to his reserved nature. During his brother's illness, Yrigoyen befriended two of his brother's friends, Carlos Pellegrini and Roque Sáenz Peña, who would play significant roles in the institutional changes that would eventually bring Hipólito Yrigoyen to the presidency.

== Armed rebellion ==
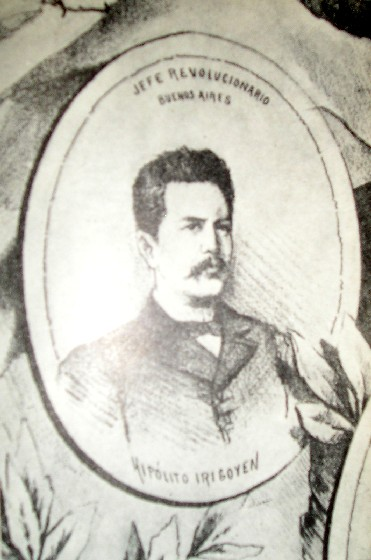
Hipólito Yrigoyen, revolutionary leader 1893. Sketch by Eduardo Sojo, published in the magazine Don Quijote.

On 10 April 1892, Luis Sáenz Peña was elected President of Argentina. One week before, President Carlos Pellegrini had declared a state of siege and, with the justification of a radical conspiracy, sent Leandro N. Alem to prison. Practically all of the radical leaders were arrested over a period of two months, with the exception of Yrigoyen. In November of that year, the National Convention of the Civic Radical Union (UCR) was convened, in which Alem and Yrigoyen made a declaration that called for an armed uprising against the regime. The Convention approved a manifesto that labeled the source of the government's power as "based in fraud and violence". On 17 November, the Civic Radical Union issued its charter, the first document of its kind in the history of the party. This was the first in a series of events that began the new radical revolution.

On 29 July 1893, the governor of San Luis was overthrown by Juan Sáa, and on 31 July, after a day of bloody conflict, they took the city of Rosario. Meanwhile, in Buenos Aires, Yrigoyen decided to put his plan into practice. Several radical leaders left the city, heading towards the interior of the province, each one assigned a specific task to carry out the new rebellion. At his El Trigo estancia, he met with his friends and some of his workers, some sixty people in all, and they headed towards the Las Flores police station, which they took without resistance. He arrived in Temperley on the morning of 3 August alongside 1,200 men and established their encampment for the revolution, led and organized by Marcelo T. Alvear. The encampment housed as many as 2,800 armed citizens, who arrived in columns to take adjacent towns. On 4 August, the head of the rebellion created several battalions to defend the settlement in Temperley, whose forces had grown to 4,500 men, divided into eighteen battalions. Facing this situation, the governor resigned that same day. Two days later, the Committee of the Province was formed, with Yrigoyen presiding over it, and met in Lomas de Zamora with the attendance of some seventy members. Domingo Demaría requested Yrigoyen to be provisional governor of the province, but he rejected that offer emphatically, believing that he had participated in the revolution to end an illegal government, not to install another one. Before the insistence of his fellow revolutionaries, he told them, "Neither provisional, nor definitive".

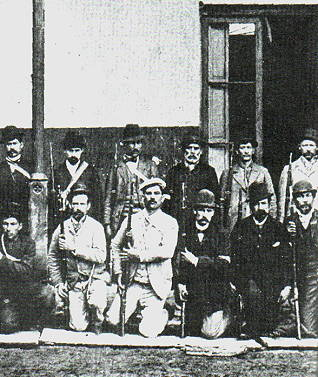
Revolutionary Army Troops after their training in Temperley (1893)

After a crisis in the ministry that led to the resignation of several ministers, on 3 July 1893, Luis Sáenz Peña called on Aristóbulo del Valle, who had been retired from politics since the fracture of the Civic Union, to reorganize it. Del Valle first attempted to invite the UCR Committee to participate in the new ministry, to no avail. He then attempted to call on a number of radical figures to join some of the ministries, but they all forcefully rejected the offer. He came up with a plan to disarm the paramilitary forces that existed in several provinces that some governors were using to retain their power. He also asked Congress to use federal intervention to replace the governors of Buenos Aires, Santa Fe, and San Luis, which were the provinces mostly controlled by the oligarchy. Given his proximity to the government, del Valle could have staged a coup d'état, as Alem had asked him to, but his legal convictions stopped him from taking action even when it would mean the failure of the revolution.

On 8 August, a railway formation left from Temperley to take La Plata, the capital of the Province of Buenos Aires. Colonel Martín Yrigoyen, Hipólito's brother, led 3,500 civilians who after some fighting overthrew Governor Carlos Costa and took the city of La Plata. Martín and Hipólito's forces combined, and around 4,500 people marched between 13th and 44th street. The Yrigoyen brothers marched to the front of the revolutionary troop to an ovation from the people of La Plata. They decided to use the hippodrome near the train station as an encampment, bringing to an end the peaceful capture of La Plata.

That same day, the Provincial Committee met in Lomas de Zamora to elect a provisional governor, Juan Carlos Begrano, who chose Marcelo T. de Alvear as his Minister of Public Works. The provisional government would only last nine days. When the national government sent troops to intervene, Belgrano did not resist and turned his power over to Eduardo Olivera. The national government designated Manuel Quintana as Minister of the Interior, who sent a powerful military force to defeat the revolution.

On 25 August, the Committee of the Province officially announced that it would lay down its arms. Alem insisted on ordering a new uprising throughout the country, but Yrigoyen disagreed because he believed that Quintana would crush the revolution by any means necessary. This was the beginning of the dwindling of the relationship between the two leaders. By October, the revolution had been totally defeated. Yrigoyen was advised that he was to be arrested and when he left his house in the early morning, he was detained by the police. This was the first time in his life that he was arrested. He was transferred to an old war boat and then to a pontoon that was holding several radical prisoners, where they suffered nausea from the poor hygienic conditions. Soon after, they were sent to Montevideo, Uruguay, the only foreign land to which Yrigoyen ever travelled, where they remained until December. He returned to Uruguay many years later after being overthrown.

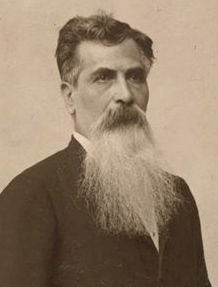
Leandro N. Alem, the uncle of Yrigoyen, and a role model that he followed. In 1896, after Alem's suicide, Yrigoyen would become more isolated than ever.

It was just prior to this revolution that Yrigoyen met Alvear, more specifically when there was an opening for Chief of Police of the city of Buenos Aires. Artistóbulo del Valle proposed a relative of Alem, who had been commissioner. This is how he made contact with Alvear and other civic figures such as Le Breton, Apellániz, and Senillosa. Alvear and Yrigoyen would see each other at the Paris Café and at committee meetings. He would always hold a special appreciation for Alvear, even in the later years of the caudillo's life, after the radical leaders had come into conflict with each other. As an anecdote about the two leaders, it can be mentioned that in 1897, Lisandro de la Torre challenged Yrigoyen to a fencing duel. Alvear had a few days to teach his friend the basics of fencing, since Yrigoyen had no knowledge of fencing and de la Torre was an expert. The duel took place on 6 September and Yrigoyen was able to achieve several touches on de la Torre's face and won the duel. During his presidency, he would continue to practice fencing, a pastime that he never gave up, even in his 70s. In 1897, he joined the Jockey Club and went several times, and although he never set foot in the institution after 1900, he continued to be a member until his death.

On 1 July 1896, Leandro Alem committed suicide in the middle of the street. Aristóbulo del Valle had died prematurely in January of that year, leaving the leadership of the party to Yrigoyen. However, on the night of Alem's wake, he announced that the loss of his uncle was too grave to allow him to lead the party, and he asked those present to return to their provinces of origin until further notice.

When the National Convention of the UCR issued the so-called "parallel policy" on 6 September 1897, to hold elections with the mitristas, after a meeting UCR Provincial Committee meeting 29 September at Alvear's house in which they voted to dissolve the committee in order to defeat the bernardistas, radicalism would enter a state of disorganization until the party's reorganization in 1904. This was a total contradiction of the pact with the mitristas that the president of the National Committee, Bernardo de Iriogyen, had signed as a tactic to fight against Julio A. Roca during his second presidency in 1898.

== Revolution of 1905 ==
There were several signs in early February 1905 that a new radical revolution was coming, and in late January, the revolutionaries left for their destinations throughout the country to begin their revolt. However, both the government and the police suspected that there were plans of a conspiracy against them and so they broke into several buildings and arrested civilians who resorted to their weapons. Alarmed, General Smith, the Army Chief of Staff, headed to the armory to fortify his unit and defend the city's arsenal. Thirty-three unarmed revolutionaries entered at 4 a.m. and were arrested when they asked for Martín Yrigoyen. The revolutionaries' failure to capture the arsenal reduced hope for the revolution, as the plan had been to arm civilians with weapons from the arsenal.

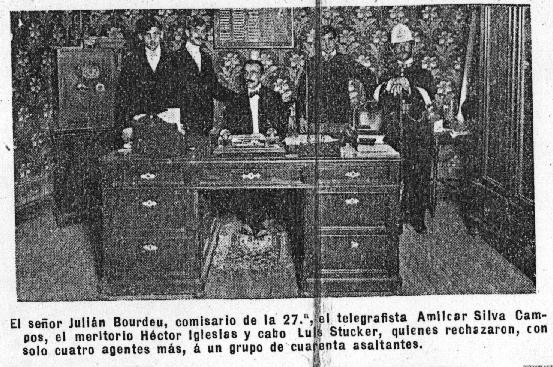
Commissary Julián Bourdeu of the Policía de la Capital (Buenos Aires, Argentina) and part of the staff of the 27th precinct, days after the Radical Party revolution, a photo published by the Argentine magazine Caras y Caretas in its 11 February 1905 issue

At 3:45, President Manuel Quintana arrived at the Governor's Palace to convene an emergency meeting of his cabinet and declared a state of siege throughout the country. Successful uprisings took place in Bahía Blanca, Mendoza, Córdoba and Rosario, but the capital was kept under the government's control. In Mendoza, the governor was deposed and José Néstor Lencinas, the head of the Revolutionary Junta, took the command of provisional governor. In Córdoba, an infantry led by Delfor Del Valle Vice President José Figueroa Alcorta, President Roca's son Julio Argentino Pascual Roca, and several government leaders who happened to be in Córdoba. Del Valle attempted to capture President Roca, but he managed to escape to Santiago del Estero. In La Plata, there were rumors of suspected movements, but no revolution happensd there. Several revolutionary leaders escaped to Chile or Uruguay, but some, such as Delfor Del Valle, were captured when they tried to leave the country, and others turned themselves in. Some 70 civil prisoners were held on the naval ship Santa Cruz and confined into small spaces with poor living conditions. On 5 March, the state of siege was extended for 70 days, and the prisoners were quickly tried with punishments of up to eight years in prison, and on 2 May, they were sent on the Patria to a prison in Ushuaia.

Yrigoyen had maintained his anonymity during the last few weeks of the uprising. It was announced that at the end of February, he would appear at the Federal Court. On 28 February, there was a large crowd and significant police presence waiting for him, but he did not appear, and the government ended up exonerating him. Yrigoyen was able to support the leaders financially in exile because of the success of his estancias. A few months after the revolution ended, a civic association appeared, the Association of May, which started a pro-amnesty movement supported by the National Party of Uruguay. Yrigoyen began to run the association to gain freedom for the imprisoned revolutionaries, but that clashed with Quintana's inflexibility. However, Quintana died in March 1906, and José Figueroa Alcorta became president from the modernist National Autonomist Party (PAN), which passed a law of amnesty proposed by former President Carlos Pellegrini among others. Yrigoyen met with President Figueroa Alcorta in 1907 and 1908 to try to convince him to call for corruption-free elections, but he found little success. Yrigoyen revealed the conversations in the Convention of 1909.

In the 1910 presidential elections, the modernist National Autonomist Party elected Roque Sáenz Peña as its candidate. Sáenz Peña was for establishing an election system that would put an end to electoral fraud, and he was not only a friend of Yrigoyen but also had cofounded the defunct Republican Party with Yrigoyen 30 years before.

== Path to electoral reform ==
The long-postponed political change began its process with the arrival to the presidency of Roque Sáenz Peña, an internal opponent of the National Autonomist Party. He focused all of his efforts into passing a law to guarantee secret, universal, and mandatory elections for all citizens. After overcoming resistance from the conservatives, who were opposed to the exercise of total democracy, his plan became the so-called Sáenz Peña Law. The issue of suffrage was dealt with in three laws: Law Nº 4161, on 29 December 1902, which made possible the first representation of the Socialist Party; Law Nº 4578, on 24 July 1905, intended to calm that year's revolution; and Nº 8871, the famous Sáenz Peña Law, passed on 10 February 1912. While this was predictable, the attitude of President Sáenz Peña is notable for attending to the demands of the people, knowing that it would gravely affect the dominance of the conservatives. It is worth mentioning, however, that the new law applied only to elections for national offices: president, vice-president, national deputies, and national senators. The rest of the elections would continue to be held according to the laws in each province. However, the governor of Santa Fe was replaced in 1912 by federal intervention, and the new governor organized elections for provincial governor and the provincial legislature in accord with the new electoral reform. The Radical Civic Union decided to participate and won the election, bringing to power Manuel Menchaca, the first Argentine governor to be elected in secret elections.

In early March 1916, the National Committee of the Radical Civic Union met to call a Convention, which would take place on 20 March at the Casa Suiza, with the attendance of 138 delegates. At the session, the committee designated a commission made up of delegates Vicente Gallo, José Camilo Crotto, Pelagio Luna, José Saravia, and Isaías Amado. At the same time, it named another commission, made up of Eudoro Vargas Gómez, Crotto, Luna, and Marcelo T. de Alvear, tasked with meeting with President Victorino de la Plaza with the goal of demanding a clean and free election. The following day, while the first commission was debating whether to put the Constitution into effect after years of institutional disorder, the second commission that met with President De La Plaza did not return with encouraging news. That divided the opinions of the delegates, leading them to suspend the session to be continued on 22 March at Onrubia Theater, where they would also have to choose their candidates for president and vice-president.

Starting at eight in the morning, the theater was packed with people and taken over by nerves because although it was known that Yrigoyen would win unanimously, the delegates knew that he would not accept the candidacy. In regards to the vice-presidency, there were demands by the "blue" group to be on the ticket, and finally, Pelagio Luna, from La Rioja, was designated the vice-presidential candidate. At 10:30 am, the voting began: Yrigoyen received 150 votes, with two for Leopoldo Meto and one each for Alvear, Crotto, and Gallo. Crotto rejected the vote that he was given, standing by his position that only Yrigoyen could be the candidate. In the vice-presidential selection, Luna received 81 votes with Gallo receiving 59, and Joaquín Castellanos and Melo received one each. While the delegates waited for the acceptances of the candidacies, a demonstration gathered outside Yrigoyen's house, but there is no indication that anyone was able to enter. Yrigoyen had gone to meet with the board of directors of the Convention in Crotto's study on the Avenida de Mayo, where he declined to accept the candidacy. Crotto proposed to form a commission to meet with Yrigoyen with the goal of convincing him to accept the candidacy. The delegates Guido and Oyhanarte headed to the residency on Avenida Brasil 1039 and communicated to Yrigoyen that if he rejected the candidacy, it would be the end of the fight. At 6:30 pm, Yrigoyen accepted. The news prompted a celebration in front of the house on Avenida Brasil 1039.

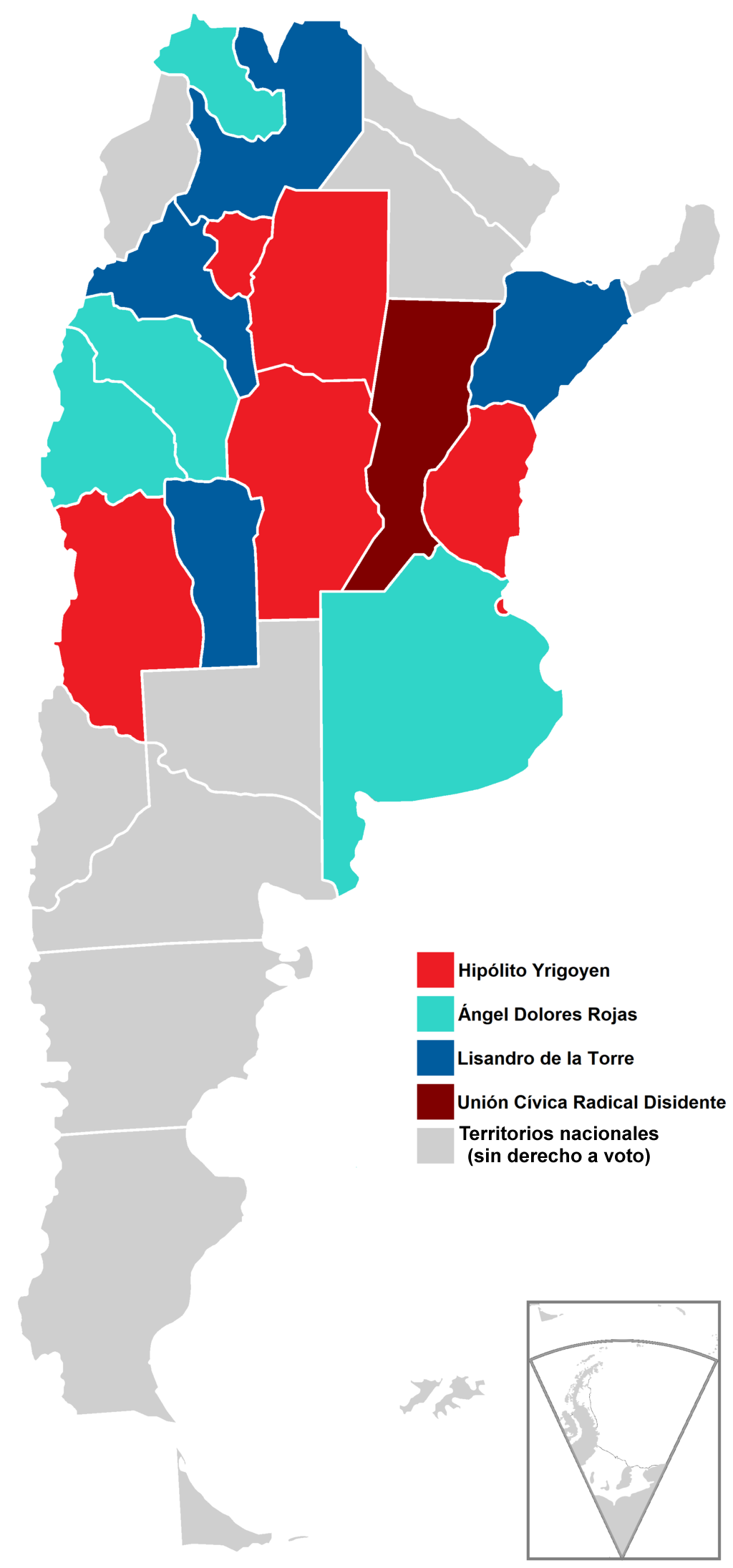
Results of the 1916 Argentine General Election

== Presidential elections of 1916 ==
The presidential elections on 2 April 1916 were the first in the history of Argentina to adopt the Sáenz Peña Law, which guaranteed a secret and mandatory vote for men, and it is thus considered to have resulted in the first democratic government in the history of Argentina, with the clarification that the first completely democratic government was the second presidency of Juan Domingo Perón in 1951, when women were able to exercise their right to vote and be voted for.

The first effects of the law were unexpected for the reformers: radicals and socialists turned out in almost every corner of the country, with the exception of the Province of Buenos Aires, which was fervently controlled by the traditional political apparatus. The provincial parties that controlled the old regime failed in their attempt to form a new conservative political force.

The Hipólito Yrigoyen–Pelagio Luna ticket prevailed over the Conservative Party ticket (Ángel Rojas–Juan Eugenio Serú) in the popular vote with 339,332 votes, versus 153,406 votes for the Conservative Party. They also won in the Electoral College with 152 votes. The Congress was composed of 45 radicals and 75 opponents in the Chamber of Deputies; in the Senate there were only 4 radicals and 26 opponents. A total of eleven provinces were still being represented by members of the previous regime. After swearing in before the Legislative Assembly, the new president was literally carried by a deluge of people to the Casa Rosada, without any kind of security detail. Historian Luis Alberto Romero notes that something had truly changed when "100,000 people accompanied the new president on his way from the Congress to the Palace of Government. The opponents were horrified by the presence of the 'sandal-wearing riffraff', a prejudice, certainly, but one that marked the beginning of a new age of democracy." When thirteen electors were needed for radicalism to triumph, the conservatives went to Santa Fe to try to persuade electors who were enemies with the party's authorities. When Yrigoyen was asked about this, he said the famous quote, "Let one thousand elections be lost before we sacrifice our principles."

The Spanish Ambassador to Argentina attended the event on behalf of his country and wrote the following for the newspaper La Época:

In my diplomatic career I have attended famous celebrations in different European courts; I have been present for the ascent of a President of France and a King of England; I have seen popular spectacles extraordinary in number and enthusiasm. But I cannot remember anything comparable to the incredible scene of a Head of State thrown into the arms of his people, carried back and forth by the electrified crowd, to the high seat of honor of the first mandate of his homeland (...). But all that pales in comparison to the reality of the immense plaza, of the human ocean mad with joy, of the president dedicated to his people with his heart and soul, without guards, without an army, without police.

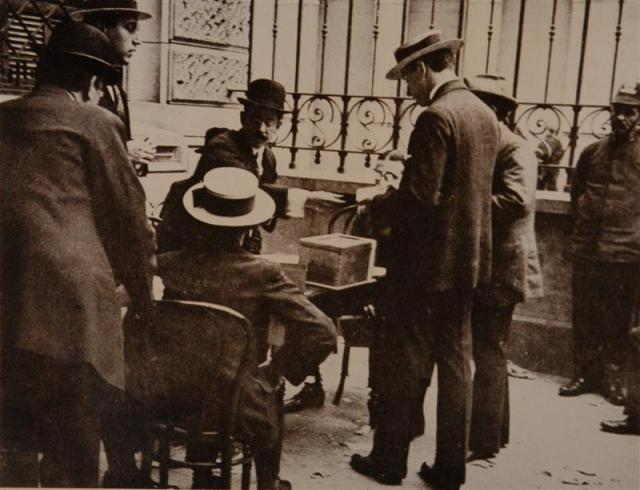
1916 Argentine Elections, the first in the country's history to feature guaranteed secret, universal, and mandatory male suffrage

Yrigoyen had suggested to President Figueroa Alcorta at the time to intervene in fourteen federal states where fraud was still in practice, and had been since the creation of the League of Governors, from which his primary mentors Miguel Ángel Juárez Celman and Julio Argentino Roca came. The federal interventions, called for "civic hygiene", were carried out slowly by the executive branch in times of legislative recess. With the exception of the provinces governed by radicals who had come into power legitimately, the rest were put into power through intervention. The intervention's goal was to call for legal elections and for the winners to become the new governor. In many districts, radicalism won, although in provinces such as Corrientes and San Luis, the conservatives prevailed, and in those cases the popular decision was respected. Additionally, were no interventions in the provinces of Santa Fe, Buenos, Aires, or Jujuy.

The electoral victory meant that, for the first time, a large social class that had until then been excluded from public office was running different state functions. This was the middle class, without great economic resources, nor connections to the upper classes. The presence of "nameless" civil servants was a subject of much satire in the conservative press. During the first years of his government, Yrigoyen led through decrees, since many of the initiatives he sent to Congress failed due to the conservative majority that still prevailed. Only after the 1918 Legislative Elections did radicalism obtain the majority in the lower chamber.

Despite the congressional minority, Yrigioyen maintained an attitude inclined towards dialogue and negotiation, not only with the traditional conservative parties that controlled the Senate, but also with the new popular parties that had gained prominence from the secret vote: the Socialist Party and the Democratic Progressive Party. He developed radicalism as a "religion of redemption" for the "liberation of Argentina", he was not seen as a politician but as an "apostle", and he believed that the Radical Civic Union was not a party but rather "a motherland itself":

== First presidency (1916–1922) ==
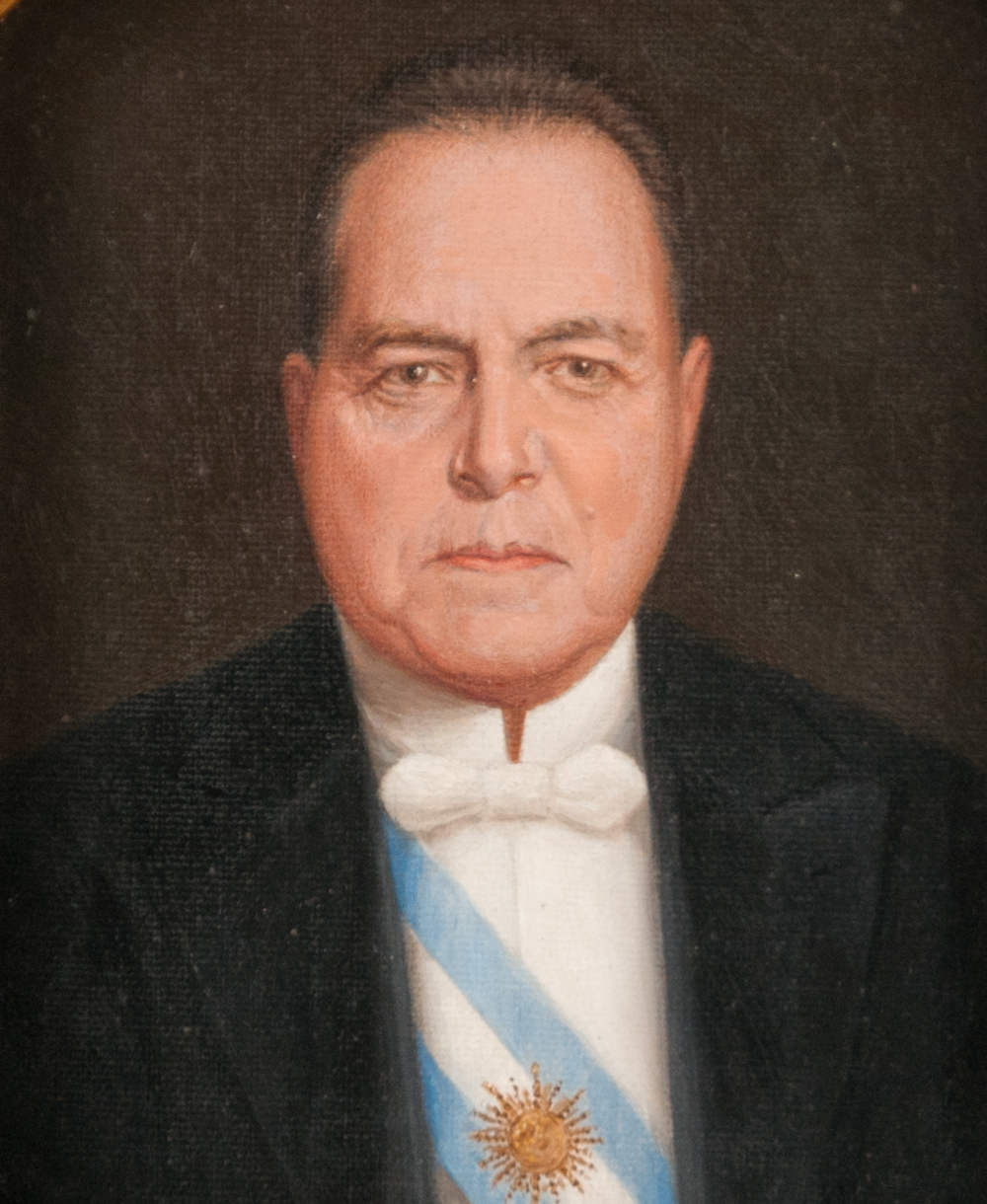
Official portrait, c. 1920

Yrigoyen was the nation's first president to sustain a nationalist ideology, convinced that the country had to manage its own currency and credit, and most of all, control over its transports, energy networks, and petroleum exploitation. To this end, he designed the plans for a Central Bank in order to nationalize foreign trade, founded the energy company YPF, and placed controls on the concessions of the foreign businesses that managed the country's railroads. Gabriel del Mazo, historian of radicalism, says that Yrigoyen's government was characterized by his "Petroleum and Land Plan". In addition to the defense of domestic assets, Yrigoyen was able to contain the expansionism of the large foreign economic groups that were active in the country. Facing the aggressive interventionist policy of the United States in Latin America, he defended his non-interventionist principles, going as far as ordering Argentina's war boats in one case to wave the flag of the Dominican Republic rather than that of the U.S., who had hoisted theirs on the island after the 1916 occupation.

As far as the railroads were concerned, Yrigoyen placed rigorous controls on the railways in British hands, especially in regards to tariffs and fixation of capital accounts. He also promoted State Railways, looking for a way to reach the Pacific Ocean to facilitate transport of goods from the northwest and southwest of the country to reach Perú, Chile, and Bolivia.

The initial push to achieve complete democratic rights was stopped, since the UCR neither controlled the Senate nor the governorships in many provinces. Yrigoyen resorted in several cases to federal intervention in the provinces, which deepened the confrontation with the conservative sectors. During his first presidency, he intervened in the provinces twenty times; only five by law, and ten in provinces governed by radicals. The government argued that the provinces whose governors had been chosen in elections prior to the electoral reform were illegitimate.

=== Social policy, 1916–1922 ===
Various reforms were enacted during Yrigoyen's first presidency. In 1918 a law was enacted fixing the conditions of homework, providing (as noted by oen study) "that a minimum wage for such work shall be fixed by mixed committees of employers and employees." A law was passed in 1919 providing the building of workers' houses at reasonable prices, while in 1921 a maximum increase in rent was fixed by law as a means of tackling an exorbitant rise in rents. A 1917 homestead law provided for grants of 500 acres of public land in the far north and far south, while from 1919 the National Mortgage Bank was permitted to make funds available for landless farmers to purchase rural property. In 1921 a tenant rental law was passed spelling out (as noted by one study) "rights and limitations of rental contracts and working conditions." In 1919 a railroad worker pension plan was amended, and was further amended in 1921 (as one study has noted) "to create a fund to build houses for railroaders and in that way helped to alleviate the decided shortage of decent affordable housing." A law of 1921 prohibited the manufacture, sale or importation of matches containing white or yellow phosphorus. More than 3,000 new schools were founded while illiteracy was combated, and the government helped set up an extensive consumer cooperative for employees of the state railways.

A presidential decree was signed concerning the work of women and children. In accordance with this decree, "every hall in stores, warehouses, millinery and other commercial establishments must have chairs, provided with backs, equal in number to two-thirds of the female workers employed." In 1921 a fund was established for old age, disability and survivors' pensions for personnel working at various public utilities owned by foreign corporations, along with those working in hospitals and clinics. Various public health initiatives were carried out For instance, Law 10,998 of 21 October 1919 authorised the Board of Sanitary Works of the Nation to construct water works and sewage systems in all towns of the Republic with over 8,000 inhabitants. According to a presidential message from 1921 "The Executive Power has dedicated its greatest care to the development of social assistance services, being its constant desire that they correspond to the needs of the population. Within the limited means available to it, its action has been rapid, tending to reduce the ills that afflict the needy, concurring in some cases with the requested aid, reaching out to other means of aid to the populations and expanding the capacity of the hospital establishments with the essential elements for their regular operation."

=== Economic policy, 1916–1922 ===
The economic expansion that Argentina experienced during the period known as the "radical republic" (1916–1930), with an average annual expansion of 8.1%, is still today one of the greatest periods of economic growth in the history of the country. However, Yrigoyen had to confront problems arising from World War I. His policy was maintaining neutrality, which meant in economic terms continuing supply to its traditional allies and customers. The nations at war demanded cheap supplies, such as blankets and canned meat, which saw their exports triple between 1914 and 1920. This was nothing compared to the exports of corn and refrigerated meat (which was of higher quality than the canned meat). In turn, the import of manufactured goods from Europe stopped as the warring nations focused their resources on war industry. This caused industries to emerge to produce the products that were previously being imported. Between 1914 and 1921, commerce grew with the United States, as England and other European nations had nothing to offer Argentina.

When the war began, President Victorino de la Plaza ordered the suspension of the exchange of gold for paper currency that the Caja de conversión began in 1889 as a temporary solution for the Baring crisis and to prevent a capital outflow. This allowed the Argentine currency to maintain a gold standard. Fourteen million pesos in gold came back into the country from Paris and London, where it had been deposited by European merchants in the name of Argentine exporters. Thanks to this, the Argentine peso reached an 80% gold standard by the end of Yriogyen's first government. The government attempted, to no avail, to create the Bank of the Republic in 1917, a financial entity whose objective would be to regulate the economy and national finances. In a five-year period, it did not issue debt instruments, and external debt was reduced to 225,000,000 pesos, the reason for which many public positions were left vacant to reduce public spending. Congress did not levy taxes on returns, though the administration requested this in 1919. In the same year, Congress passed regulations over conciliation and arbitration in workers' conflicts, establishing a junta presided over by the chair of the National Labor Department, and made up of a representative of each party in the conflict, to arrive at a viable understanding for workers and employers. Also in 1919, a law was brought to Congress regulating work in manufacturing and the production of yerba mate, citing that the conditions of the workers were inhumane. This law, Nº 11.728, was passed in the following radical administration in 1925, but it was vetoed by Marcelo T. de Alvear at the insistence of the Congress.

The prices on the international market began to decline slowly starting 1914, while the prices of manufactured products that Argentina was importing began to climb in relation to the price of grains. This created an increasingly difficult situation that became an economic crisis, eventually resulting in a global economic crisis in 1929. An industry with little development, created during World War I but shrunk afterwards, an economic organization that obtained almost all its resources from customs duties, and a budget with a negative balance, among other things, characterized the Argentine economy during the radical period from 1916 to 1930.

=== Violence ===
During his first presidency, workers' strikes were violently suppressed in events such as La Forestal massacre, the Tragic Week and the suppression of the Patagonia Rebelde. The anti-labor violence was often assisted by the paramilitary nationalist group Argentine Patriotic League.

=== 1918 and 1920 legislative elections ===
In 1918, the UCR received 367,263 votes, and in 1920, the party received 338,723 votes. Although the UCR won a considerable number of seats in the national legislature, the Senate's slow constitutional turnover meant that the upper chamber did not yet represent the electorate. The death of Pelagio Luna in 1919 had a notable influence on the legislative body and the fact that many radical senators were not aligned with Yrigoyen's government were a few of the factors that stopped several of Yrigoyen's proposals in the Senate.

== Second presidency (1928–1930) ==
On the expiration of Alvear's term in 1928, Yrigoyen was overwhelmingly elected President for the second time.

In December 1929, U.S. President-elect Herbert Hoover visited Argentina on a goodwill tour, meeting with President Yrigoyen on policies regarding trade and tariffs. Radical anarchist elements attempted to assassinate Hoover by attempting to place a bomb near his rail car, but the bomber was arrested before he could complete his work. President Yrigoyen accompanied Hoover thereafter as a personal guarantee of safety until he left the country.

=== Domestic policy, 1928–1930 ===
In domestic policy, additional reforms were introduced during Yrigoyen's second presidency. On 12 June 1929, Yrigoyen authorized funding for the establishment of primary schools throughout the nation (4,514,470 pesos for the establishment of primary schools in Buenos Aires, the Provinces and National Territories). An act of 29 August 1929, which came into force on 12 March 1930, established the eight-hour workday and forty-eight hour workweek for all salaried employees and workers. A resolution passed on 7 August 1929, added a registry to the Ministry of Agriculture, whose purpose, as noted by one study, was "to compile and distribute information concerning agricultural lands, such as prices, distance from important market and railway centers, and other data of interest to farm owners and to other persons wishing to purchase land."

=== Fall from power ===
In the fallout of the Great Depression, Yrigoyen's presidency ended due to conspiracies by rival factions who capitalized on flaws in his government. and conservative sectors of the army plotted openly for a regime change, as did American corporations, such as the Standard Oil of New Jersey, who opposed the president's efforts to curb oil smuggling from Salta Province to Bolivia, as well as the existence of YPF itself. Yrigoyen, in his seventies, was also kept uninformed of the true state of the nation by aides who censored his access to news reports of the global depression's impact. On 24 December 1929 he survived an assassination attempt.

Opposition parties won the congressional elections of 1928 and 1930.

On 6 September 1930, Yrigoyen was deposed in a military coup led by General José Félix Uriburu. This was the first military coup since the adoption of the Argentine constitution. After the coup d'état, Enrique Pérez Colman, Minister of Finance in the Yrigoyen cabinet; General Moscini, former Director of YPF; General Baldrich, and a number of Yrigoyenist deputies were arrested by the provisional government of General Uriburu.

The new government of Uriburu adopted the most severe measures to prevent reprisals and counter-revolutionary tactics by friends of the ousted administration. The aforementioned Yrigoyenist personalities were later released.

== Later life and death ==
After his overthrow, Yrigoyen was placed under house arrest and confined several times to Martín García Island. He died in Buenos Aires on 3 July 1933 and was buried in La Recoleta Cemetery.

== Bibliography ==
- Amuchástegui, Antonio (1972). Mentalidades argentinas 1860–1930. Editorial Universitaria de Buenos Aires.
- Herrera de Noble, Ernestina (2010). Hipólito Yrigoyen. Grandes biografías de los 200 años. Buenos Aires: Sol 90. ISBN 978-987-07-0844-5..
- Herrera de Noble, Ernestina (dir.) (2011a). Diario Clarín (ed.). Yrigoyen gana con la nueva ley 1916. Historia de las elecciones argentinas. Vol. 3. Buenos Aires: Artes Gráficas Rioplatenses. ISBN 978-987-07-1392-0. (Series ISBN 978-987-07-1389-0)
- Luna, Félix (1986). Yrigoyen. Hyspamerica. ISBN 950-614-361-7.
- Luna, Félix (1999). Alvear. Editorial Sudamericana. ISBN 950-07-1522-8.

Political offices
Preceded by Victorino de la Plaza	President of Argentina; 1916–1922	Succeeded by Marcelo T. de Alvear
Preceded by Marcelo T. de Alvear	President of Argentina; 1928–1930	Succeeded by José Félix Uriburu
