= Pelagio Luna =

Argentine politician (1867–1919)

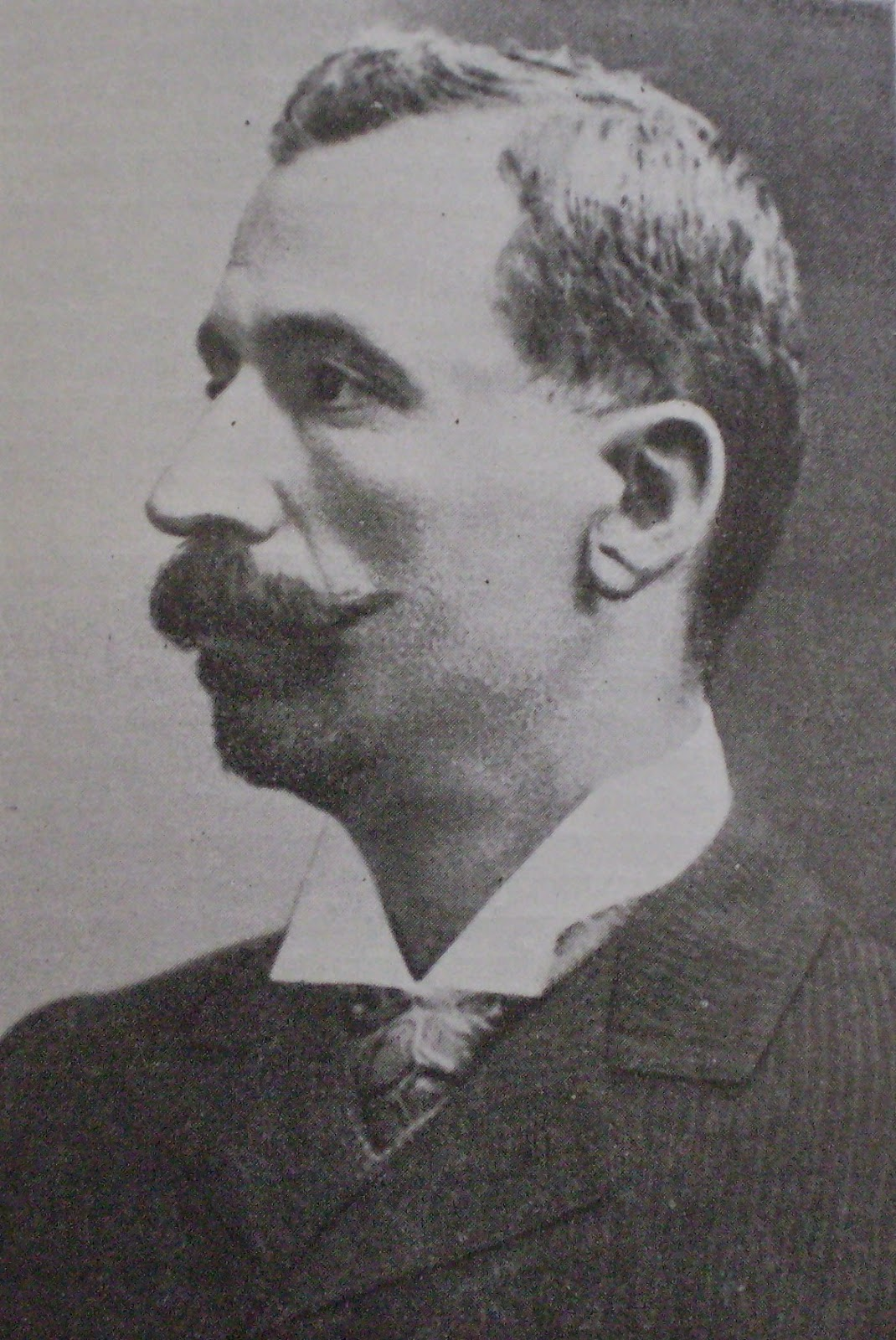

12th Vice President of Argentina
- In office October 12, 1916 – June 25, 1919
- President: Hipólito Yrigoyen
- Preceded by: Victorino de la Plaza
- Succeeded by: Elpidio González

Personal details
- Born: 6 January 1867 La Rioja, Argentina
- Died: June 25, 1919 (aged 52)
- Party: Radical Civic Union
- Profession: Lawyer

Pelagio Baltasar Luna (6 January 1867 – June 25, 1919) was an Argentine politician of the Radical Civic Union. He was elected Vice President in 1916.

Born in La Rioja, Argentina, where his father was founder of the Radical Civic Union, Luna graduated from the University of Buenos Aires at the age of 22. He returned to La Rioja and worked as a lawyer, then entered the judicial system, serving as a judge. He also taught literature at the National School of La Rioja.

Luna joined the Radical Youth in 1889 and took part in the armed revolution the following year. He was part of the National Convention of November 1892. He was a candidate for National Deputy in 1912 and for governor of La Rioja in 1913, without success.

In 1916, Luna was elected vice president on Hipólito Yrigoyen's ticket, as the first elected vice president under the Sáenz Peña Law, serving until his death in 1919. As President of the Senate, he helped create the National Library of Argentina, serving as its first president.

== Bibliography ==
- Luna, Félix (2004). El antipersonalismo. Vol. Anales. Academia Nacional de Ciencias Morales y políticas. .
- Luna, Félix (1964). Yrigoyen. Buenos Aires: Desarrollo.

Political offices
| Preceded by Victorino de la Plaza | Vice President of Argentina; 1916-1919 | Succeeded by Elpidio González |
