= Jorge Eduardo Lozano =

Argentine Roman Catholic archbishop

The Most Reverend Jorge Eduardo Lozano
- Archbishop of San Juan de Cuyo
- Church: Catholic Church
- See: San Juan de Cuyo
- Appointed: 17 June 2017
- Predecessor: Alfonso Delgado Evers
- Previous posts: Titular Bishop of Furnos maior (2000–05); Auxiliary Bishop of Buenos Aires (2000–05); Bishop of Gualeguaychú (2005–16); Coadjutor Archbishop of San Juan de Cuyo (2016–17)

Orders
- Ordination: 3 December 1982 by Juan Carlos Aramburu
- Consecration: 25 March 2000 by Jorge Mario Bergoglio

Personal details
- Born: 10 February 1955 (age 71) Buenos Aires, Argentina
- Education: Pontifical Catholic University of Argentina

Jorge Eduardo Lozano (born 10 February 1955) is a prelate of the Roman Catholic Church. He served as auxiliary bishop of Buenos Aires from 2000 until 2005, when he became bishop of Gualeguaychú. He became coadjutor archbishop of San Juan de Cuyo in 2016 and succeeded to that see in 2017.

== Life ==
Born in Buenos Aires on 10 February 1955, Lozano was ordained to the priesthood by Cardinal Juan Carlos Aramburu, Archbishop of Buenos Aires, on 3 December 1982.

On 4 January 2000, Pope John Paul II appointed him auxiliary bishop of Buenos Aires and titular bishop of Furnos Maior.

He received his episcopal consecration on 25 March from Jorge Mario Bergoglio, archbishop of Buenos Aires, with the bishop of San Martín, Raúl Omar Rossi, and auxiliary bishop of Buenos Aires, Mario José Serra, serving as co-consecrators.

Pope Benedict XVI appointed him bishop of Gualeguaychú on 22 December 2005, and he was installed on 11 March 2006.

Pope Francis named him coadjutor archbishop for the Archdiocese of San Juan de Cuyo on 31 August 2016, and he became its archbishop on 17 June 2017.

On 6 November 2020 he was named secretary general of the Episcopal Conference of Latin America (CELAM).

Catholic Church titles
Preceded by Héctor Sabatino Cardelli	Titular Bishop of Furnos Maior; 2000–2005	Succeeded by Alessandro Carmelo Ruffinoni S.C.
Preceded by Luis Guillermo Eichhorn	Bishop of Gualeguaychú; 2005–2016	Succeeded by Héctor Luis Zordán
Preceded by	Archbishop Coadjutor of San Juan de Cuyo; 2016–2017	Succeeded by
Preceded by Alfonso Delgado Evers	Archbishop of San Juan de Cuyo; 2017–present	Succeeded by incumbent
