= Victorino de la Plaza =

13th President of Argentina

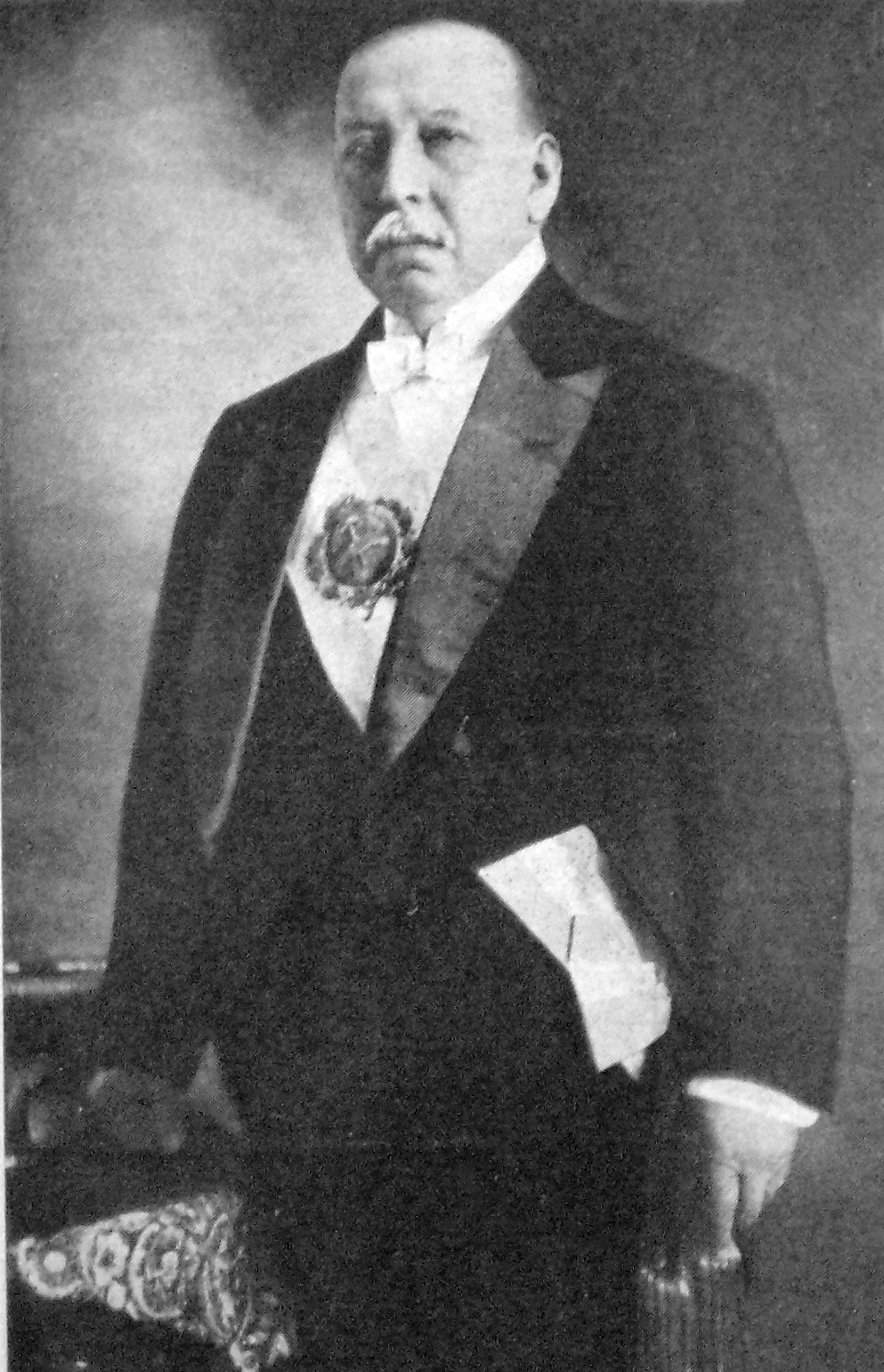
- de la Plaza with the presidential sash.

18th President of Argentina
- In office 10 August 1914 – 11 October 1916
- Vice President: Vacant
- Preceded by: Roque Sáenz Peña
- Succeeded by: Hipólito Yrigoyen

11th Vice President of Argentina
- In office 12 October 1910 – 9 August 1914
- President: Roque Sáenz Peña
- Preceded by: José Figueroa Alcorta
- Succeeded by: Pelagio Luna

Personal details
- Born: 2 November 1840 Payagosta, Salta, Argentina
- Died: 2 October 1919 (aged 78) Buenos Aires, Argentina
- Party: National Autonomist Party
- Spouse: Epifanía Ecilda Belvis Castellanos (1870–1875)
- Profession: Lawyer

Victorino de la Plaza (2 November 1840 – 2 October 1919) was an Argentine politician and lawyer who served as President of Argentina from 9 August 1914 to 11 October 1916.

The second son of José Roque Mariano de la Plaza Elejalde and Manuela Silva; his older brother, Rafael de la Plaza, was also a politician and acted as governor of Santiago del Estero Province.

He studied law in Buenos Aires and obtained his doctorate in 1868, became secretary of Dalmacio Vélez Sársfield and collaborated on the writing of the Argentine Civil Code, and was Treasury Minister under Nicolás Avellaneda (1876), later Interventor in Corrientes Province (1878) and Foreign Minister (1882) and Treasury (1883–1885) during the first Julio Argentino Roca administration. He was elected vice president for the National Union presided by Roque Sáenz Peña in 1910, and assumed the presidency after the death of Sáenz Peña and governed between 1914 and 1916. He died of pneumonia after retiring from politics.

He was the last president of what was called the conservative period of Argentine history. This period began in 1880 and culminated with La Plaza's loss of the presidency to the Radical Civic Union. This was all thanks to the Sáenz Peña Law, which established secret, compulsory voting for all those on the electoral register, thanks to Compulsory military service.

== Childhood and early life ==
Victorino de La Plaza was born on 2 November 1840 in Payagosta, Salta Province, Argentina. He was the son of Jose Mariano Roque de La Plaza y Elejalde and Maria Manuela Silva. His brother was Rafel de La Plaza, who was governor of the province of Santiago del Estero. Upon his Father's death, his mother took charge of raising the children.

Victorino began his education at an Argentine public school, yet he stayed in that school for a short period of time, because he entered a Franciscan convent. During his childhood he did a little bit of work, he sold newspapers, sweets and empanadas that were prepared by his mother. After this, he began working as an attorney and as a scribe. Subsequently he passed and examination before the Supreme Court of Justice, for which he obtained the title of rotary in 1859.

He gained a scholarship granted by the government of the Confederation which allowed him to enter the Colegio de Uruguay. It is unknown exactly when he was admitted, but it is known that it was between 1859 and 1862. After this period of his education, he went to Buenos Aires, to enter Buenos Aires University. He proved to be an outstanding student and thus, this allowed President Mitre to appoint him to the position of Second Clerk, of the National Accounting Office. He was first appointed scribe, though, in 1864.

=== Military career ===
Victorino De La Plaza had a distinctly short military career. When the Triple Alliance War began, he abandoned his university studies to join an Artillery Regiment. He was chosen to be an assistant to General Julio de Vedia; a member of the Argentinian military with a prominent role against the Mapuches and in the Triple Alliance War, who was also Governor of the Chaco National Territory. He fought in the Battles of Estero Bellaco, on 2 May 1866, and the Battle of Tuyuti on 24 May of the same year. Subsequently the Government of Uruguay awarded him both the Silver Sol medal for his actions in the battle of Estero Bellaco and with the award of the Cords of Honor for his performance at the Battle of Tuyuti. Bartolome Mitre, promoted him to the rank of Captain, and have him a mention for his heroism. However, although he had performed exceptionally well he had to return to Buenos Aires due to the fact that he suffered from health problems.

=== Law ===
Upon his return to Buenos Aires, he enrolled in the Law faculty at Buenos Aires University. He graduated on 13 July 1868 with his thesis called Credit as Capital. His godfather was Dalmacio Velez Sarsfield. Whom he worked, as a scribe, for while Dalmacio was drafting the Civil code.

== Entrance into politics, and early political career. ==
During his presidency, legislation was passed in October 1915 that set up a housing commission with the object (as noted by one study) “of encouraging the erection of workers’ dwellings.” Legislation was also passed to provide safeguards against occupational hazards and diseases. In addition, a law was passed in December 1914 that stipulated (as noted by one study) “that salaries, retirement benefits, and pensions not exceeding a certain amount were exempt from seizure.”

Political offices
| Preceded by José Figueroa Alcorta | Vice President of Argentina; 1910–1914 | Succeeded by Pelagio Luna |
| Preceded by Roque Sáenz Peña | President of Argentina; 1914–1916 | Succeeded by Hipólito Yrigoyen |
