= Archdiocese of San Juan de Cuyo =

Catholic ecclesiastical territory in Argentina

Coordinates: 31°32′13″S 68°31′34″W

Archdiocese of San Juan de Cuyo Archidioecesis Sancti Ioannis de Cuyo Arquidiócesis de San Juan de Cuyo

Catholic
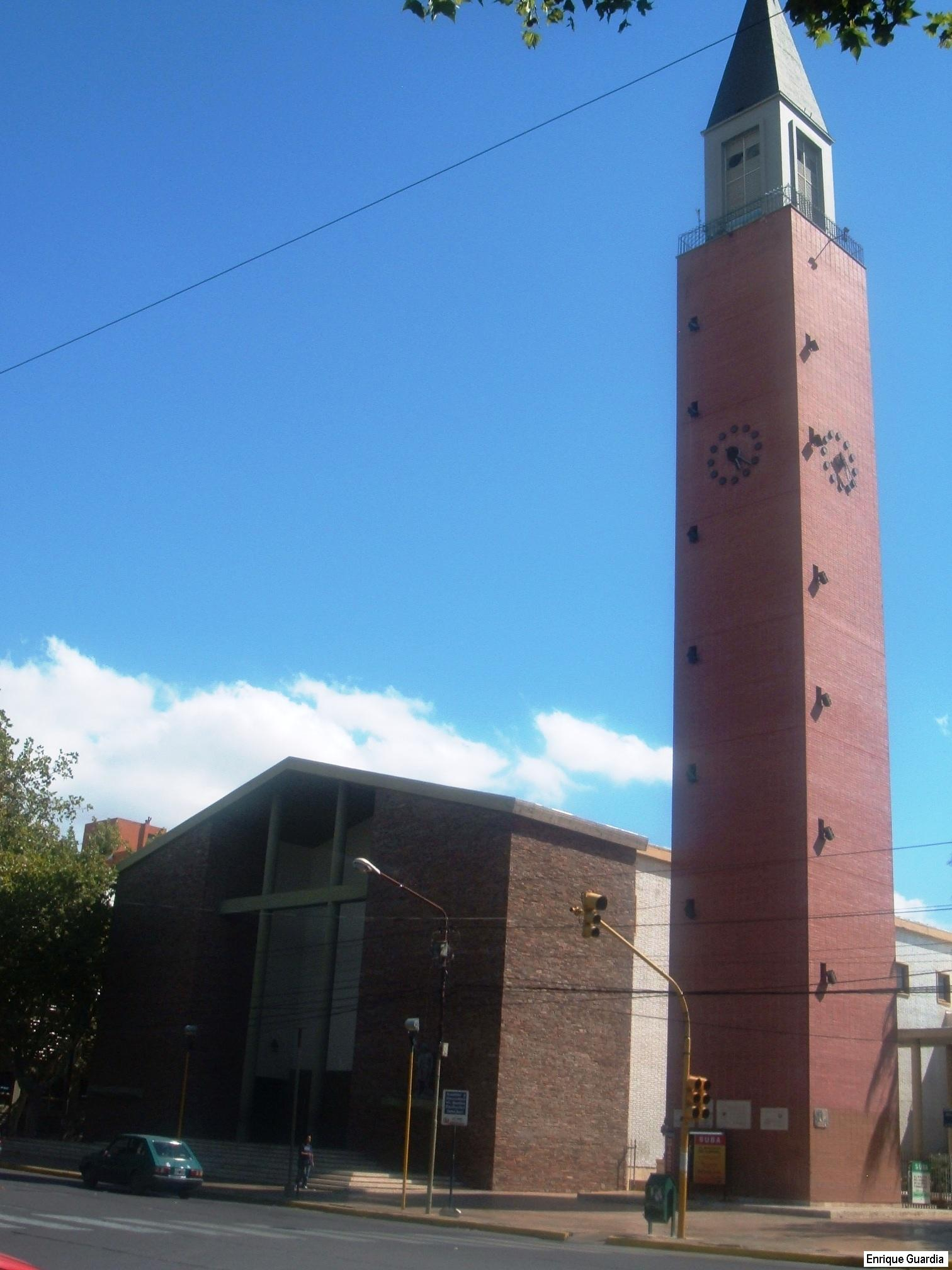
- Cathedral of St. John the Baptist

Location
- Country: Argentina
- Ecclesiastical province: San Juan de Cuyo

Statistics
- Area: 89,651 km^{2} (34,614 sq mi)
- Population: Total; Catholics: (as of 2010); 664,000; 608,000 (91.6%)
- Parishes: 41

Information
- Denomination: Roman Catholic
- Rite: Roman Rite
- Established: 1826 (199–200 years ago)
- Cathedral: San Juan de Cuyo Cathedral
- Patron saint: St John the Baptist; St Clement I

Current leadership
- Pope: Leo XIV
- Metropolitan Archbishop: Jorge Eduardo Lozano
- Bishops emeritus: Alfonso Delgado Evers

Website
- Website of the Archdiocese

The Roman Catholic Archdiocese of San Juan de Cuyo (Latin: Archidioecesis Sancti Ioannis de Cuyo) is a Latin rite metropolitan diocese in Argentina.

Its archiepiscopal seat is San Juan Cathedral (Spanish: Catedral de San Juan Bautista), dedicated to Saint John the Baptist, in San Juan, Argentina. The city also has a minor basilica: the Basílica di Nuestra Señora de los Desamparados, or the Basilica of Our Lady of the Forsaken.

== History ==
- In 1826 Pope Leo XII founded the see as the Apostolic Vicariate of San Juan de Cuyo on territory taken from the Diocese of Córdoba del Tucumán.
- Pope Gregory XVI elevated it to a diocese on 19 September 1834.
- On 20 April 1934 it was elevated to a Metropolitan Archdiocese of San Juan de Cuyo / Sancti Ioannis de Cuyo (Latin) by Pope Pius XI . On the same date it lost territory to create the dioceses of Mendoza and the suffragan Diocese of San Luis.

== Statistics ==
As per 2014, it pastorally served 638,183 Catholics (91.0% of 701,000 total) on 89,615 km² in 43 parishes and 216 missions with 96 priests (80 diocesan, 16 religious), 8 deacons, 85 lay religious (17 brothers, 68 sisters) and 21 seminarians.

== Ecclesiastical province ==
The Metropolitan's suffragan sees are :

- Roman Catholic Diocese of La Rioja
- Roman Catholic Diocese of San Luis

== Bishops ==
=== Ordinaries ===
Apostolic Vicar of San Juan de Cuyo

1. Justo Santa María de Oro, O.P. (O.P.) (1828-1834)

Bishops of San Juan de Cuyo

1. Justo Santa María de Oro, O.P. (1834-1836)
2. José Manuel Eufrasio de Quiroga Sarmiento (1837-1852)
3. Nicolás Aldazor, O.F.M. (1858-1866)
4. Venceslao Javier José Achával y Medina, O.F.M. (1867-1898)
5. Marcellino Benavente, O.P. (1899-1910)
6. José Américo Orzali (1911-1934)

Archbishops of San Juan de Cuyo

1. José Américo Orzali (1934-1939)
2. Audino Rodríguez y Olmos (1939-1965)
3. Ildefonso Maria Sansierra Robla, O.F.M. Cap. (1966-1980)
4. Ítalo Severino Di Stéfano (1980-2000)
5. Alfonso Delgado Evers (2000-2017)
6. Jorge Eduardo Lozano (2017-present)

=== Coadjutor archbishop ===
- Jorge Eduardo Lozano (2016-2017)

=== Auxiliary Bishops of San Juan de Cuyo ===
- José Hilarión de Etura y Cevallos (Ceballos), O.P. (1839-1849)
- José Benito Salvador de la Reta, O.F.M. (1881-1897)
- Juan José Marcos Zapata (1913-1951)
- Leonardo Gregorio Gallardo Heredia (1960-1961)
- Ildefonso Maria Sansierra Robla, O.F.M. Cap. (1962-1966), appointed Archbishop here
- Carlos María Domínguez, O.A.R. (2019-)

=== Other priests of this diocese who became bishops ===
- Silvino Martínez, appointed Auxiliary Bishop of Rosario in 1946
- Enrique Pechuán Marín, appointed Bishop of Cruz del Eje in 1963

== See also ==
- List of Catholic dioceses in Argentina

== Sources and external links ==
- GCatholic, with Google map - data for all sections
