= Justo de Santa María de Oro =

Argentine statesman and bishop

Justo de Santa María de Oro y Albarracín OP
- Bishop of San Juan de Cuyo
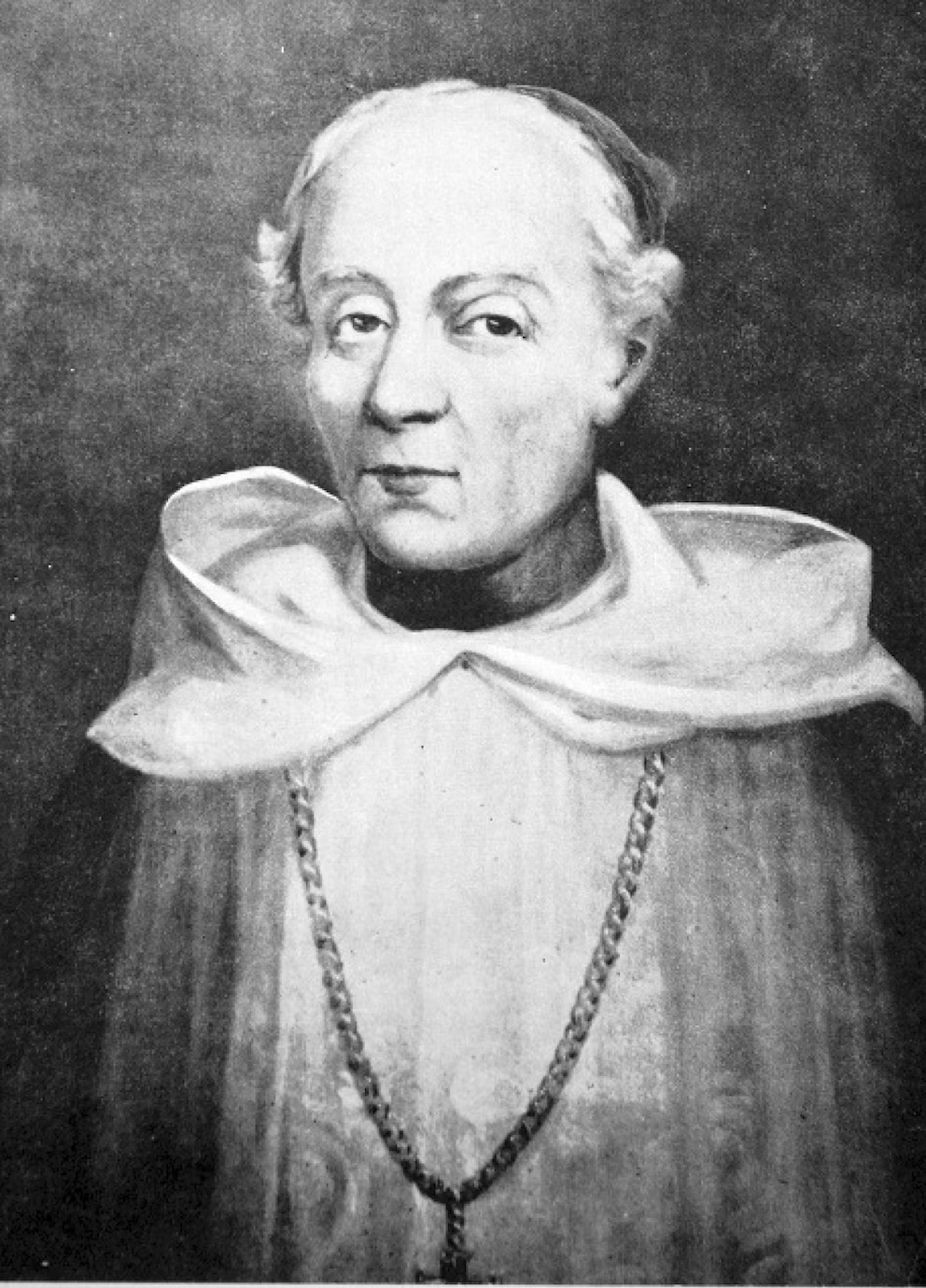
- Church: Catholic Church
- Diocese: Diocese of San Juan de Cuyo
- In office: 15 December 1828 – 19 October 1836
- Predecessor: Vicariate established
- Successor: José Manuel Quiroga Sarmiento
- Previous post: Titular Bishop of Thaumacus (1828-1834)

Orders
- Ordination: 29 November 1794
- Consecration: 21 February 1830 by José Ignacio Cienfuegos

Personal details
- Born: 3 March 1772 San Juan de la Frontera, Viceroyalty of Peru, Spanish Empire
- Died: 19 October 1836 (aged 64) San Juan, San Juan Province, Argentine Confederation

Justo de Santa María de Oro y Albarracín (3 March 1772–19 October 1836) was an Argentine statesman and bishop. He was an influential representative in the Congress of Tucumán, which on 9 July 1816, declared the Independence of Argentina.

Santa María de Oro was born in San Juan. His father was Juan Miguel de Oro Bustamante y Cossio, and his mother Elena de Albarracín y Ladrón de Guevara. He was educated at the Convent of Santo Domingo, then went to Chile to enter the Convent of Santo Domingo of Santiago. He gained his doctorate at the Royal University of San Felipe, and by the age of 20 was already teaching theology. At 21 he was ordained by Bishop Sobrino y Minayo. In 1814 he crossed the Andes with many Chilean patriots and met General José de San Martín; they became friends and collaborators. He helped to found and equip the Army of the Andes.

In 1815, Santa María de Oro was elected by San Juan to the Congress of Tucumán and served in 1816 for the declaration. He was firmly in favour of a republic and opposed those who wanted a constitutional monarchy, also believing that the people should decide.

Santa María de Oro returned to San Juan and then to Chile where he was appointed Provincial superior of his order. In 1828 he was appointed by the Pope as Apostolic Vicar in San Juan, part of the diocese of Córdoba. In 1830 he became Bishop of Taumaco and in 1834 the first Bishop of the newly created Diocese of San Juan de Cuyo.

Santa María de Oro was a second cousin to Domingo Sarmiento, President of Argentina between 1868 and 1874.
