= Sáenz Peña Law =

Electoral law in Argentina

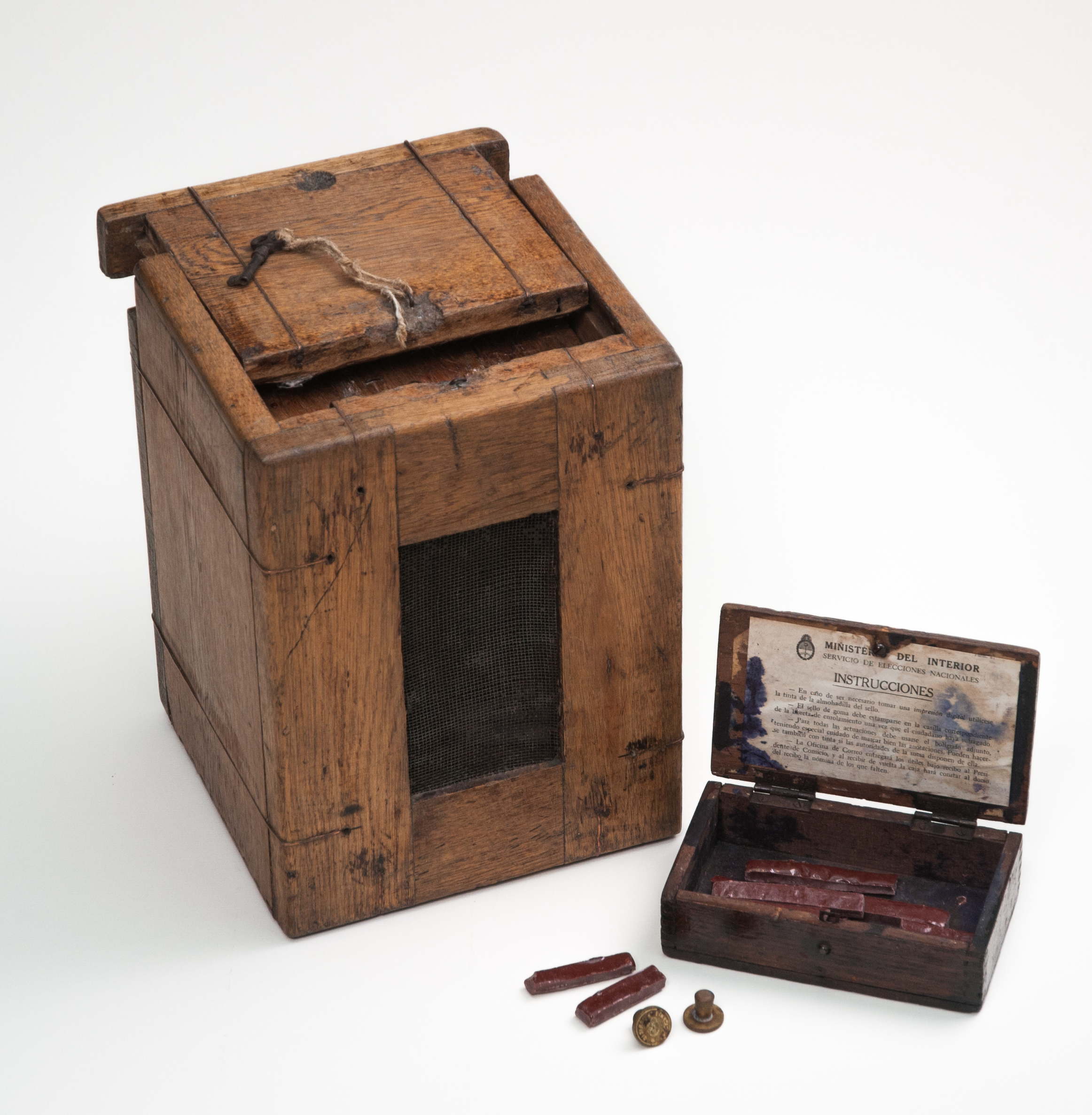
An Argentine ballot box used in the 1916 election.

The Sáenz Peña Law (Spanish: Ley Sáenz Peña) was Law 8871 of Argentina, sanctioned by the National Congress on 10 February 1912, which established the universal, secret and compulsory male suffrage through the creation of an electoral list (Padrón Electoral). It was approved during the presidency of Roque Sáenz Peña, main supporter of the law, and was published in the official government bulletin on 13 February 1912.

The right to vote for women was not covered by this law until 1947, during the first presidency of Juan Perón. The "universal" scope of the original law included only native and naturalized men but not women, nor men who were non-citizen immigrants, the latter being a very significant portion of the population at the time. Indeed, in Buenos Aires in 1914, 49% of the population was foreign-born. In the entire country, 30% of all residents were foreign-born according to the 1914 national census. The right to vote was not extended to immigrants due to concerns among the governing elite that migrants would back "extremist" parties.

== Origin ==
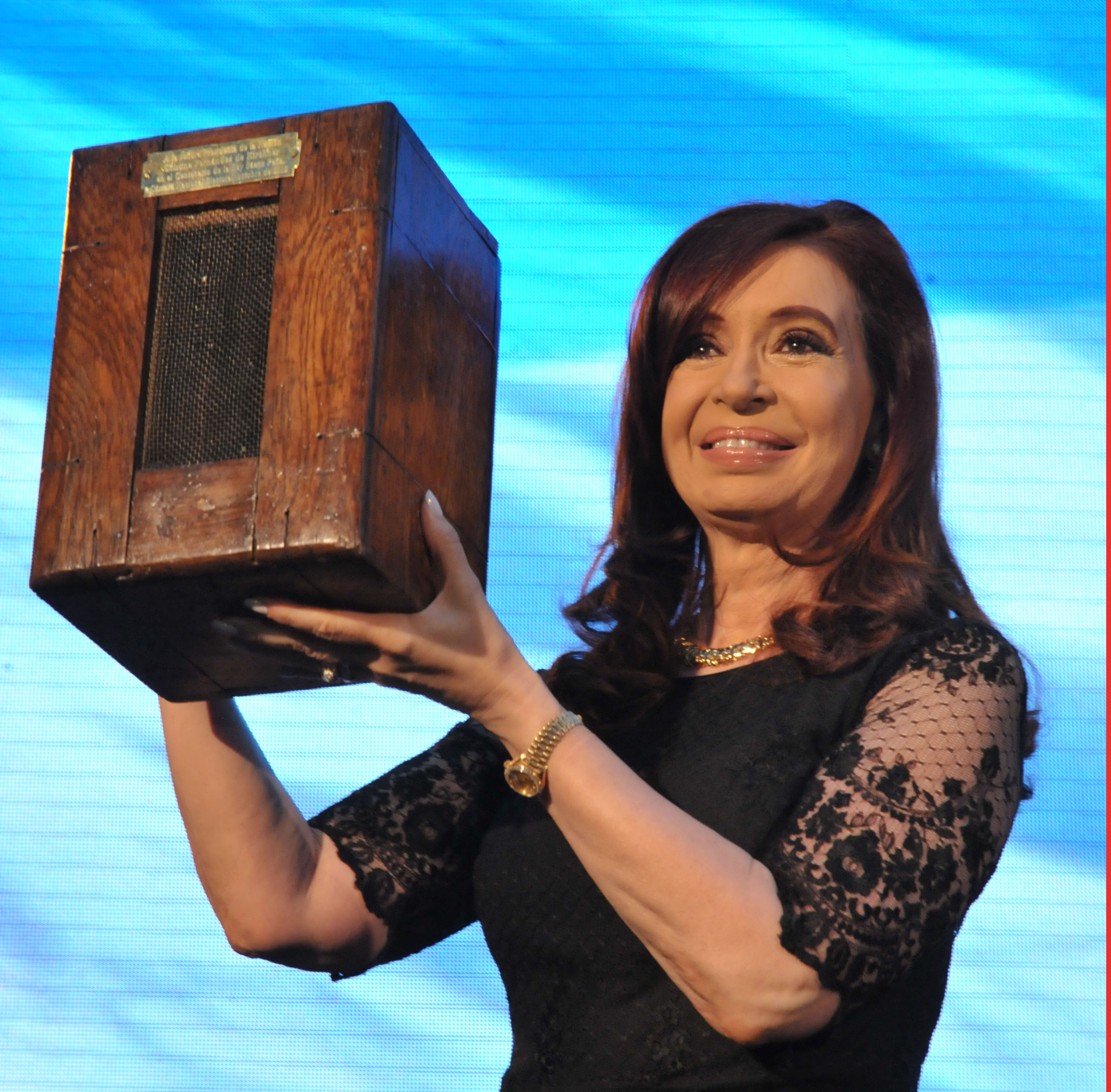
President Cristina Fernández de Kirchner with a century old ballot box in commemoration of the centenary of the passing of the Sáenz Peña Law.

Sáenz Peña made his intentions about the voting system public during his first speech before the National Congress, in 1910. Interior Minister Indalecio Gómez proposed a reform that left the compilation of the electoral list in the hands of the War Ministry (males over 18 were recorded when called for conscription), and the judicial branch was put in charge of dictating who would organize the elections and who would be allowed to vote. That deprived the executive branch of its former ability to write and manipulate the electoral list.

Prior to the passage of the law, voting in Argentina was not secret. As a consequence, vote buying, intimidation and fraud was prevalent in elections.

== Consequences ==
The conservatives, who had stayed in power for decades through dubious and fraudulent elections, could not consolidate a political party without popular support. Hipólito Yrigoyen, the candidate of the Radical Civic Union (Unión Cívica Radical, UCR), won the first presidential elections after the new law by a considerable distance, and the UCR became the most powerful political force.

As a consequence of the law, all political parties had to reorganize themselves, revising their regulations, creating electoral platforms, opening local seats and periodically gathering in assemblies.
