= Barranca Yaco =

Coordinates: 30°51′57.6″S 64°6′2.6″W

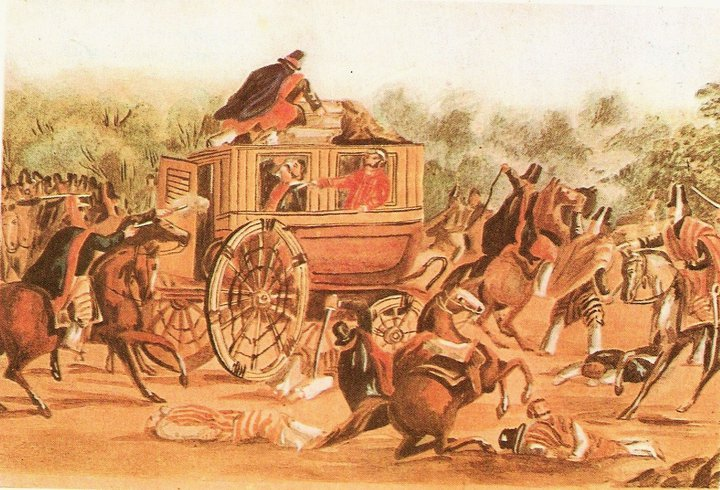
Death of Facundo Quiroga at Barranca Yaco.

Barranca Yaco or Barranca de Yaco (from the Spanish barranca (gully) and the Quechua yaku (water)) is a geographical feature along the ancient camino real (royal road) of the Viceroyalty of the Río de la Plata, located between Villa Tulumba and Sinsacate, in the province of Córdoba, Argentina. The ravine was used as a watering trough by the wagon trains traveling through the country.

The place is famous because General Juan Facundo Quiroga, governor and caudillo of La Rioja, and his escort were ambushed and killed there by a party led by the outlaw Santos Pérez, on 16 February 1835, during the Argentine Civil Wars. Santos Pérez along with the former Governor of Córdoba José Vicente Reynafé and two of his brothers were judged, found guilty and hanged in Buenos Aires for this crime in 1837. In his last words, Santos Pérez blamed Rosas for Quiroga's assassination. Since 2009 there is a memorial square that remembers Quiroga and those killed with him.

== See also ==
- Juan Facundo Quiroga
- Facundo
- Juan Manuel de Rosas
