= José Antonio Reynafé =

Argentine politician and military man

Governor of Córdoba, Argentina
- In office 1832–1833
- Preceded by: José Vicente Reynafé
- Succeeded by: Pedro Nolasco Rodríguez

Personal details
- Born: 1796 Villa Tulumba, Córdoba, Argentina
- Died: 1837 (aged 40–41) Buenos Aires, Argentina
- Resting place: La Recoleta Cemetery
- Party: Federalist Party
- Spouse: Lucía Funes.
- Occupation: Politician; Caudillo merchant
- Profession: Militia officer

Military service
- Unit: Milicias cordobesas
- Battles/wars: Argentine Civil Wars

José Antonio Reynafé (1796-1837) was an Argentine politician and military man of Irish roots, who served as acting Governor of Córdoba, Argentina. In 1837 he was executed along with his brothers for the murder of Facundo Quiroga.

He was born in Villa Tulumba, Córdoba, the son of Guillermo Queenfaith, born in Ireland, and Claudia Hidalgo Torres, belonging to an old Cordovan family.
