= Nicasius =

Nicasius was a Roman cognomen, whose variants include Nicasio, Nicaise, and Necaise. It can refer to:

== Saints ==
- Nicasius of Rheims, martyr (5th century; feast 14 December)
- Nicasius of Dijon or Nicasius of Die (4th century; feast 20 March), bishop at the first Council of Nicea
- Nicasius, Quirinus, Scubiculus, and Pientia (3rd century; feast 11 October), martyrs; the first is sometimes identified as Nicasius of Rheims.
- Nicasius of Sicily (Nicasio Burgio, Nicasius Martyr, Nicasius de Burgio) (died 1187; feast 1 July), martyred Knight Hospitaller

== Other ==
- Nicasio, California, a census designated place in Marin County
- Nicasius le Febure
- Nycasius de Clibano (fl. 1457–1497)
- Nicasius Russell (died 1646), goldsmith to Anne of Denmark
- Nicasio Silverio (born 1930), Cuban swimmer
- Nicasius, first bishop of Rouen (c. 250)
- Alberto Nicasio (1902–1980), Argentinian artist
- Juan Nicasio (born 1986), Dominican baseball pitcher
- Nicasius de Vries (born 1995), Dutch racing driver
- Viviane Nicaise (born 1952), Belgian cartoonist and colorist
