= Nicasio, California =

- Census-designated place
- St. Mary's Church in Nicasio
- Nickname: "The Town that Time Forgot"
- Location within California Location within the United States
- Coordinates: 38°03′42″N 122°41′55″W
- Country: United States
- State: California
- County: Marin County

Area
  - Total: 1.305 sq mi (3.38 km^{2})
  - Land: 1.305 sq mi (3.38 km^{2})
  - Water: 0 sq mi (0 km^{2}) 0%
- Elevation: 194 ft (59 m)

Population (2020)
  - Total: 81
  - Density: 62/sq mi (24/km^{2})
- Time zone: UTC-8 (Pacific)
  - Summer (DST): UTC-7 (PDT)
- ZIP code: 94946
- Area codes: 415/628
- FIPS code: 06-51280
- GNIS feature IDs: 1659226 and 2628764
- Website: nicasio.net

Nicasio (/nɪˈkɑːsi.oʊ/ nih-KAH-see-oh; Spanish for "Nicasius") is an unincorporated community and census-designated place in Marin County, California, United States. It is located 8 miles (13 km) west-southwest of Novato, at an elevation of 194 feet (59 m). As of the 2020 census the CDP population was 81, while population estimates for the surrounding area range from about 600 to about 900 people.

Within Nicasio and the surrounding area are about 250 homes located on approximately 350 parcels. Much of the land is still used for agricultural purposes including beef and dairy cattle grazing, small-scale truck farming (including organic farming), and the raising of forage. Several small vineyards have also been recently established. Next to Rancho Nicasio within the town of Nicasio is an organic farm, AllStar Organics, owned and operated by Janet Brown and Marty Jacobson; Janet is the vice-president of Marin Organic, Marin County's non-profit organic association. Just north of Nicasio Reservoir is Fairlea Ranch, where pedigree longhorn cattle are raised. The most significant non-agricultural business within Nicasio is George Lucas' Skywalker Ranch, a part of Lucasfilm Ltd. According to a 2004 Forbes magazine real estate survey, Nicasio is the 23rd most expensive ZIP code in the US. Nicasio has the highest per capita income ($211,993) of any census-designated place in California.

Centrally located in this area is the small village of Nicasio itself. The village is in area codes 415/628. The town center has a post office (ZIP code 94946), a general store, a tiny real estate office, St. Mary's Catholic Church (established in 1867), Nicasio Volunteer Fire Department, a baseball field located in the town square, the Rancho Nicasio Bar & Restaurant, a Druid's Hall, as well as a number of private homes. The town was founded in the early 19th century to support local agricultural, timber, and fishing activities. The town once contained the twenty-two-room Hotel Nicasio, which opened in 1867 but burned down in December 1940. Just north of town on Nicasio Valley Road next to the modern-day school building for Nicasio School District is a one-room schoolhouse that opened in 1871. The building is currently a listed historical landmark. The Nicasio post office opened in 1871, closed in 1899, and reopened in 1900.

In 2008, Dewey Livingston wrote a detailed history of the region titled Nicasio: The Historic Valley at the Center of Marin.

== Geography ==
The Nicasio region is a hydrologic zone containing the four main drainages of Nicasio Creek up to the ridgelines defining their basin. It includes the south fork of Nicasio Creek extending from Moon Hill, along the ridge separating Nicasio from San Geronimo and Samuel P. Taylor State Park, and extending northwest towards the northern end of Platform Bridge Road; the east fork (Lucas Valley fork) of Nicasio Creek extending from Loma Alta and the ridge on the north side of Sir Francis Drake Boulevard, extending up through Big Rock and up towards Big Rock Ridge; the Halleck Creek drainage, up to the ridges separating Nicasio from Novato; the northern drainages extending along the ridgelines of Rocky Ridge, Hicks Mountain and Black Mountain.

A major landmark in the area is the man-made Nicasio Reservoir. Nicasio is surrounded by forested and open ridge lines surrounding a wide rolling valley. The area along Lucas Valley Road follows a narrow valley with mostly forested hillsides above it. Oak, bay, and fir trees are common in the area, and along some of the creeks stands of redwoods are still found. Wildlife is abundant; the Nicasio chickadee, a subspecies of the chestnut-backed chickadee, was named by Robert Ridgway. Three main roads cross the area: Lucas Valley Road, Nicasio Valley Road, and the Point Reyes-Petaluma Road. Important pieces of public land in the surrounding area include Point Reyes National Seashore, portions of the Golden Gate National Recreation Area, and Samuel P. Taylor State Park.

== Demographics ==
Historical population
Census	Pop.	Note	%±
2010	96		—
2020	81		−15.6%
U.S. Decennial Census; 1860–1870 1880-1890; 1900 1910 1920; 1930 1940 1950; 1960 1970 1980; 1990 2000 2010; 2020

Nicasio first appeared as a census designated place in the 2010 U.S. census.

=== Racial and ethnic composition ===
Nicasio CDP, California – Racial and ethnic composition Note: the US Census treats Hispanic/Latino as an ethnic category. This table excludes Latinos from the racial categories and assigns them to a separate category. Hispanics/Latinos may be of any race.
Race / Ethnicity (NH = Non-Hispanic)	Pop 2010	Pop 2020	% 2010	% 2020
White alone (NH)	87	66	90.63%	81.48%
Black or African American alone (NH)	2	1	2.08%	1.23%
Native American or Alaska Native alone (NH)	0	0	0.00%	0.00%
Asian alone (NH)	0	0	0.00%	0.00%
Native Hawaiian or Pacific Islander alone (NH)	0	0	0.00%	0.00%
Other race alone (NH)	0	0	0.00%	0.00%
Mixed race or Multiracial (NH)	0	4	0.00%	4.94%
Hispanic or Latino (any race)	7	10	7.29%	12.35%
Total	96	81	100.00%	100.00%

=== 2020 ===
The 2020 United States census reported that Nicasio had a population of 81. The population density was 62.1 inhabitants per square mile (24.0/km^{2}). The racial makeup of Nicasio was 69 (85%) White, 1 (1%) African American, 0 (0%) Native American, 0 (0%) Asian, 0 (0%) Pacific Islander, 1 (1%) from other races, and 10 (12%) from two or more races. Hispanic or Latino of any race were 10 persons (12%).

The whole population lived in households. There were 30 households, out of which 12 (40%) had children under the age of 18 living in them, 19 (63%) were married-couple households, 5 (17%) were cohabiting couple households, 4 (13%) had a female householder with no partner present, and 2 (7%) had a male householder with no partner present. 4 households (13%) were one person, and 3 (10%) were one person aged 65 or older. The average household size was 2.70. There were 21 families (70% of all households).

The age distribution was 16 people (20%) under the age of 18, 3 people (4%) aged 18 to 24, 17 people (21%) aged 25 to 44, 31 people (38%) aged 45 to 64, and 14 people (17%) who were 65 years of age or older. The median age was 51.3 years. There were 35 males and 46 females.

There were 35 housing units at an average density of 26.8 units per square mile (10.3 units/km^{2}), of which 30 (86%) were occupied. Of these, 24 (80%) were owner-occupied, and 6 (20%) were occupied by renters.

== Filming location ==
- The People (1972), a made-for-TV movie starring William Shatner; locations include St. Mary's Church and the town square
- Shoot the Moon (1982), starring Albert Finney and Diane Keaton
- Village of the Damned (1995), locations including Nicasio School and homes and regions in Nicasio

The 1993 song "Daughter" by Pearl Jam was recorded in Nicasio.

== Government ==
In the California State Legislature, Nicasio is in the 2nd senatorial district, represented by Democrat Mike McGuire, and in the 12th Assembly district, represented by Democrat Damon Connolly.

In the United States House of Representatives, Nicasio is in California's 2nd congressional district, represented by Democrat Jared Huffman.

== Education ==
Nicasio is served by the Nicasio Elementary School District and the Tamalpais Union High School District.

== Notable people ==
- Jerry Garcia (1942–1995) guitarist and singer, lived in Nicasio from late 1992 until his death in 1995
- Mary Murphy Miller (1815–1882), of the Murphy family, an early settler and an owner of the Rancho San Pedro, Santa Margarita y Las Gallinas

== Gallery ==
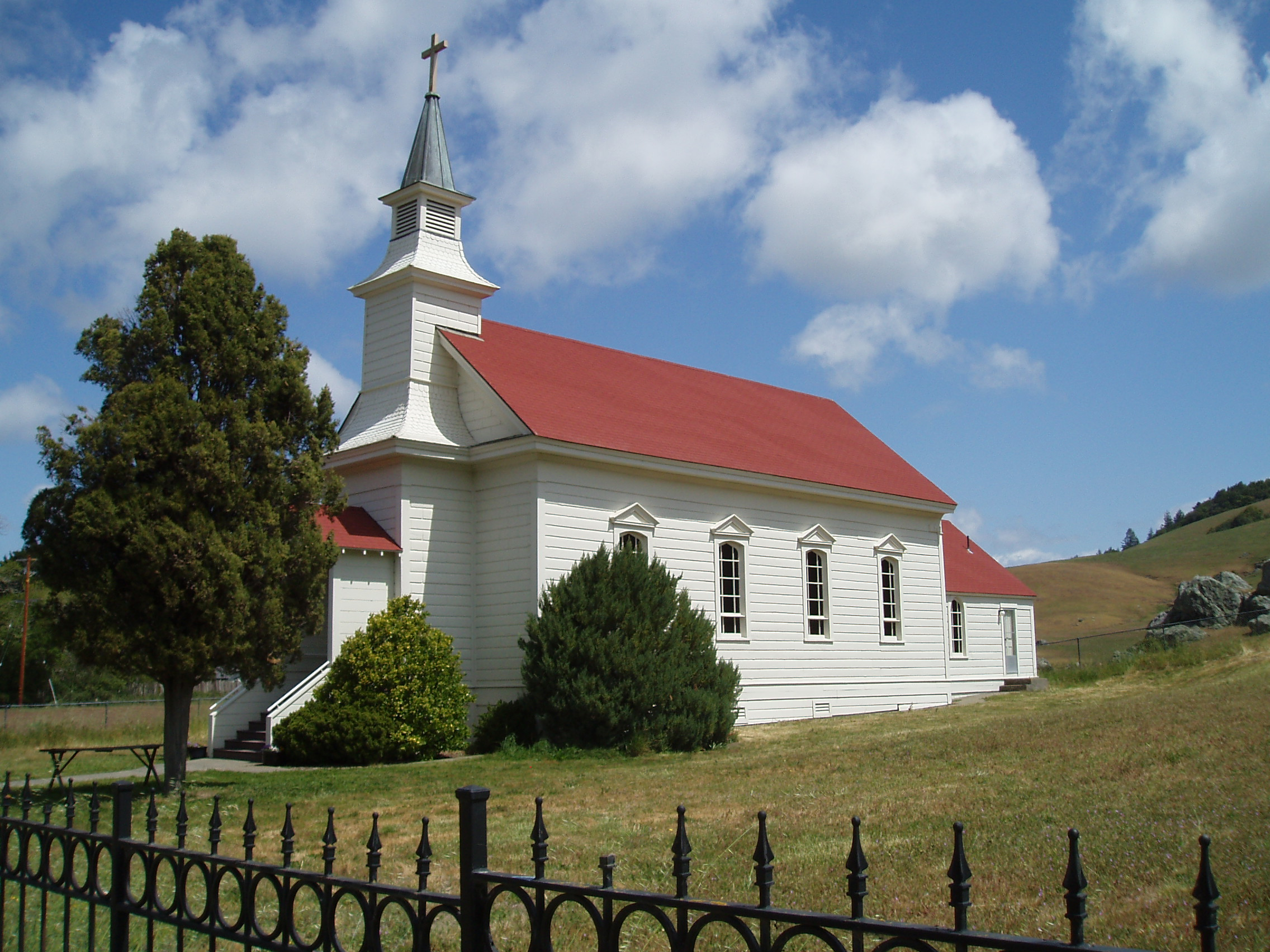
St. Mary's Church

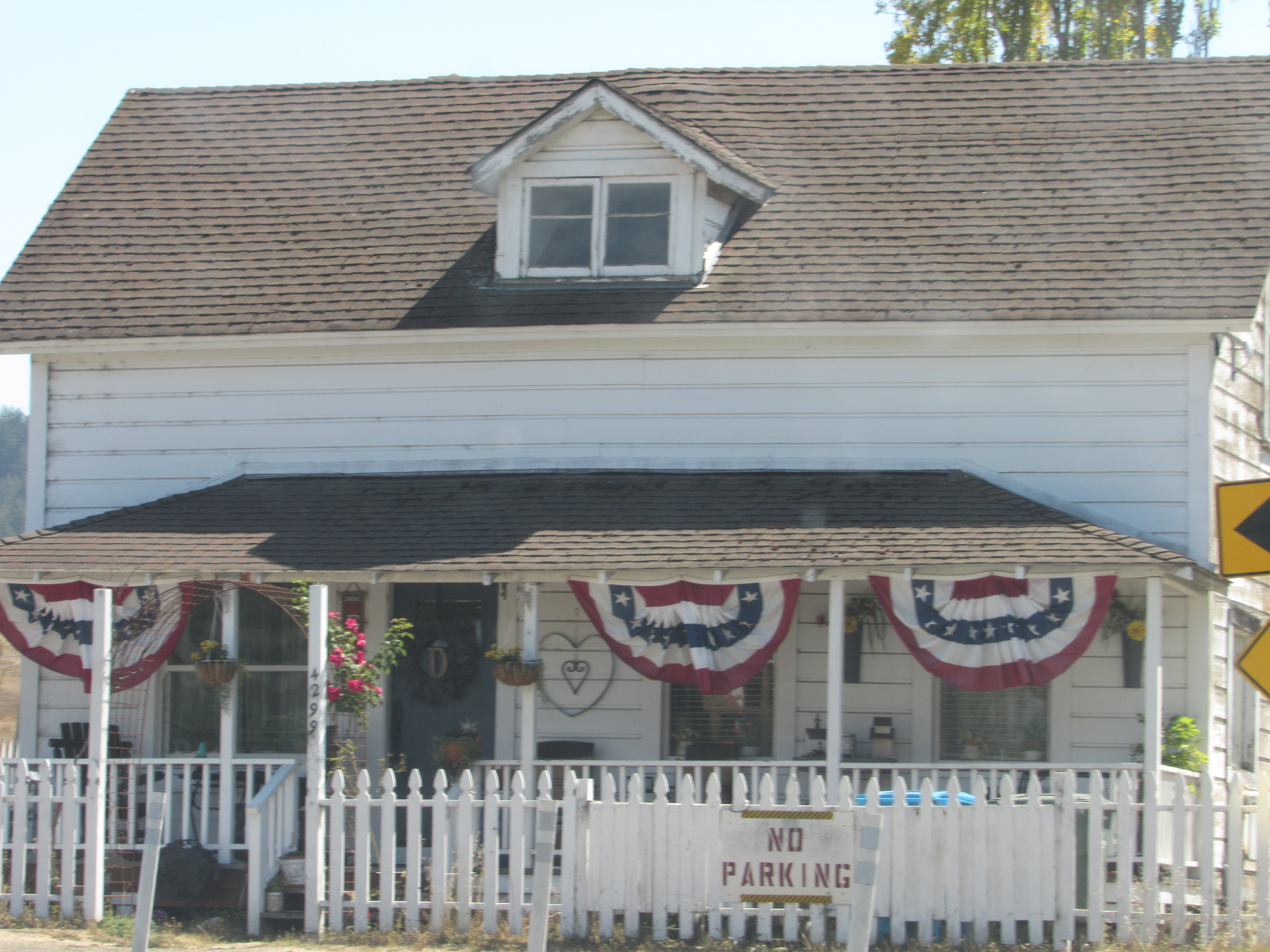
House with American flag bunting in Nicasio

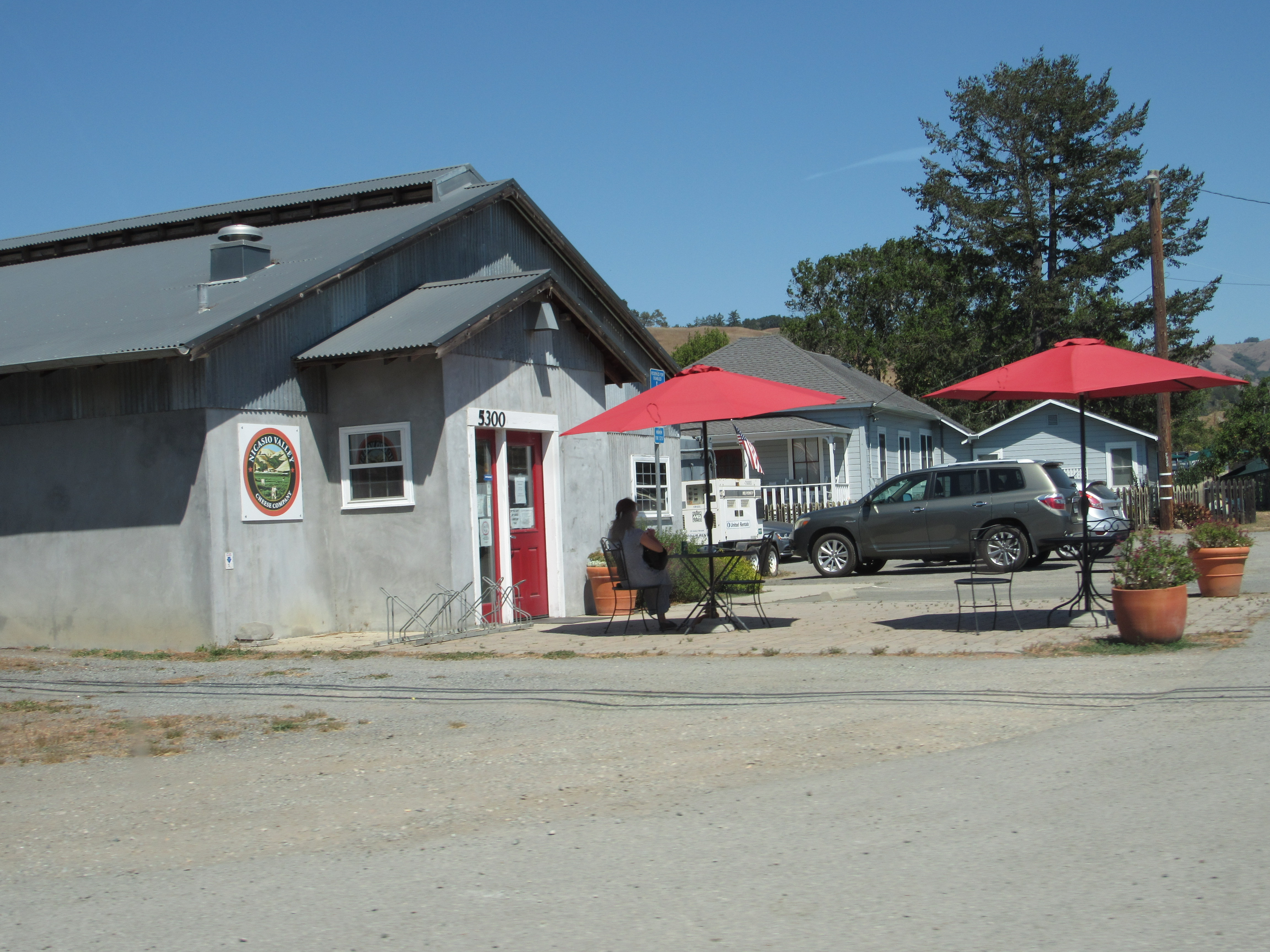
Nicasio Valley Cheese Company

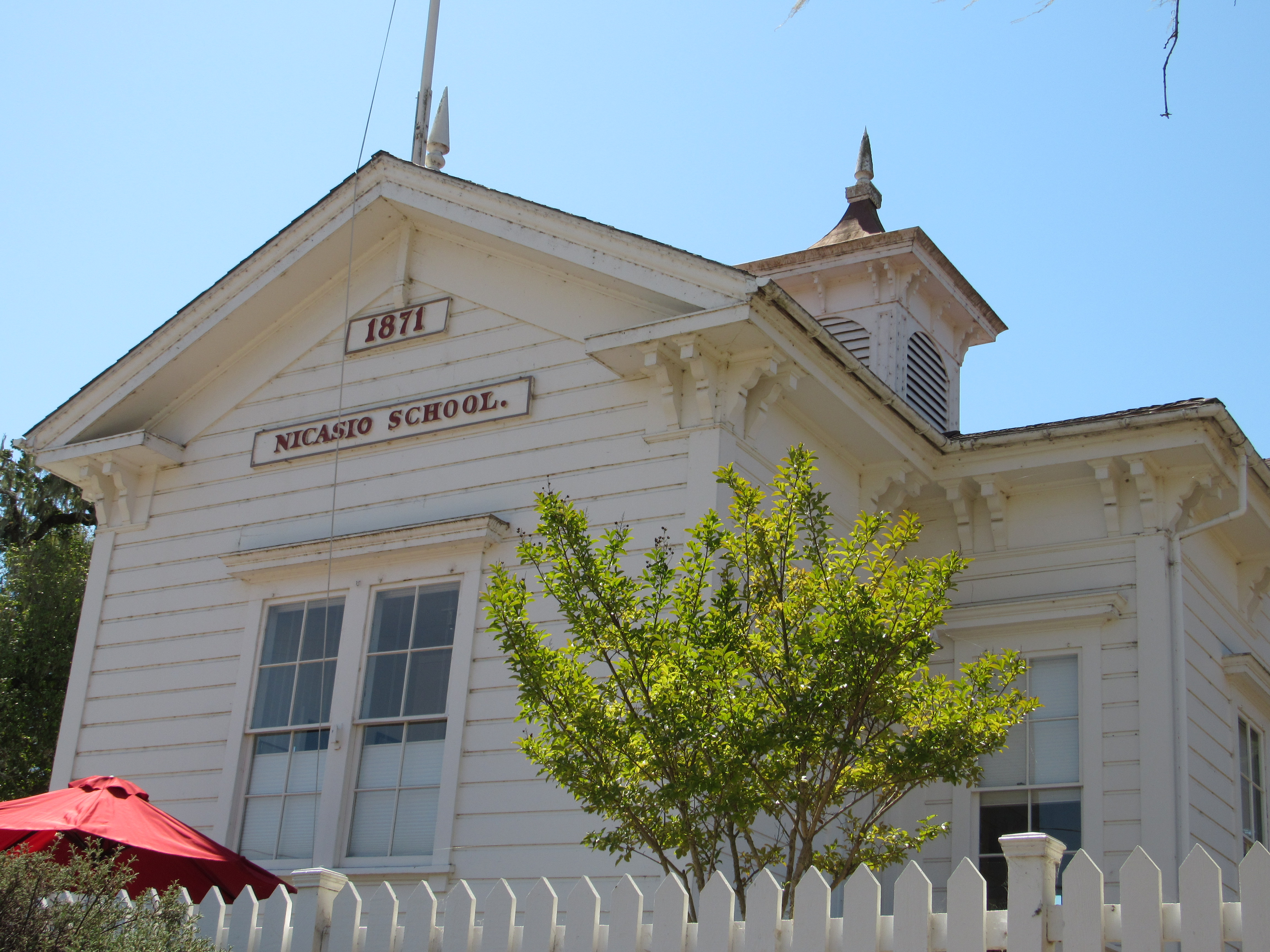
1871 Nicasio Schoolhouse

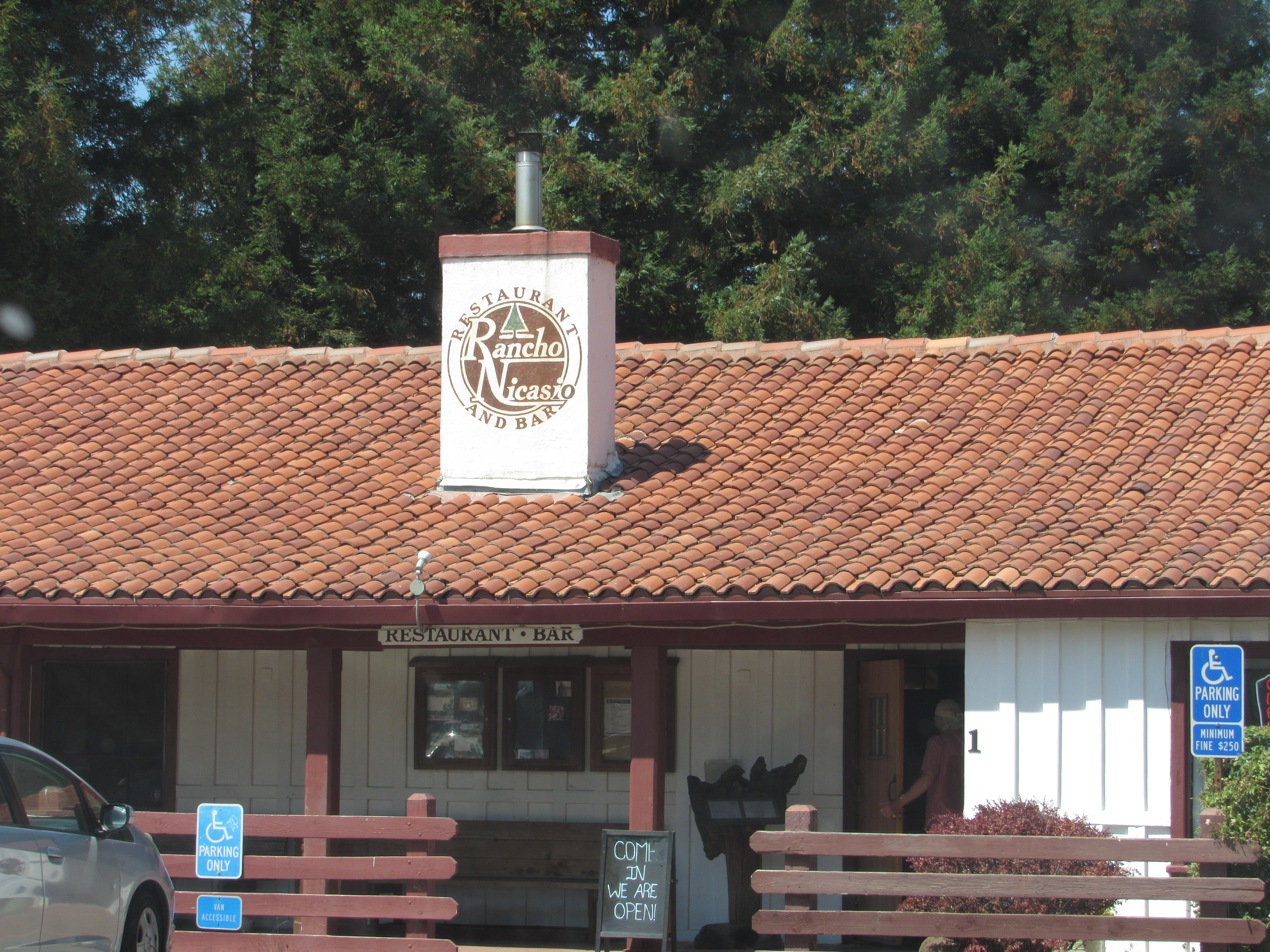
Rancho Nicasio Restaurant

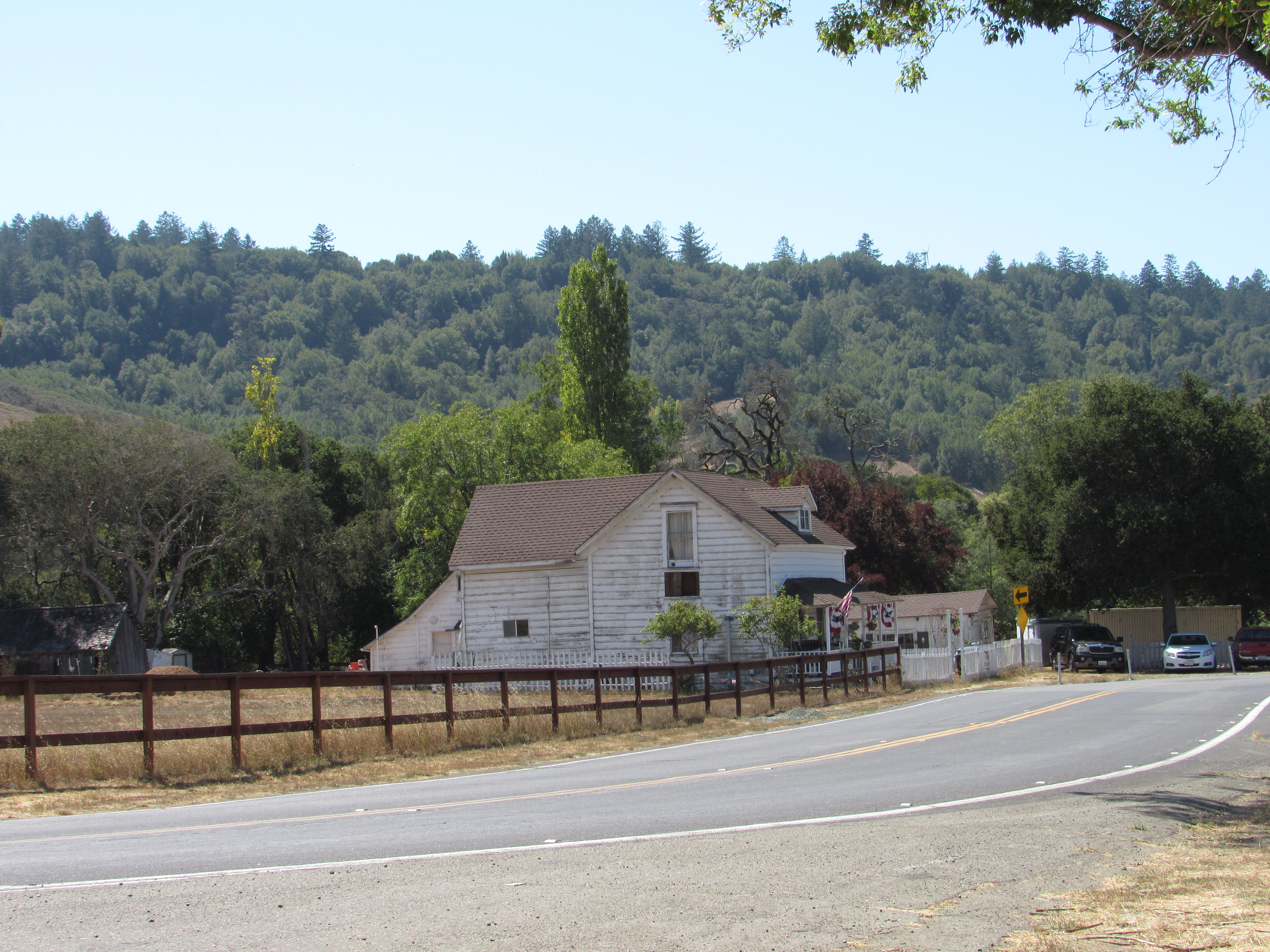
Nicasio Valley Road

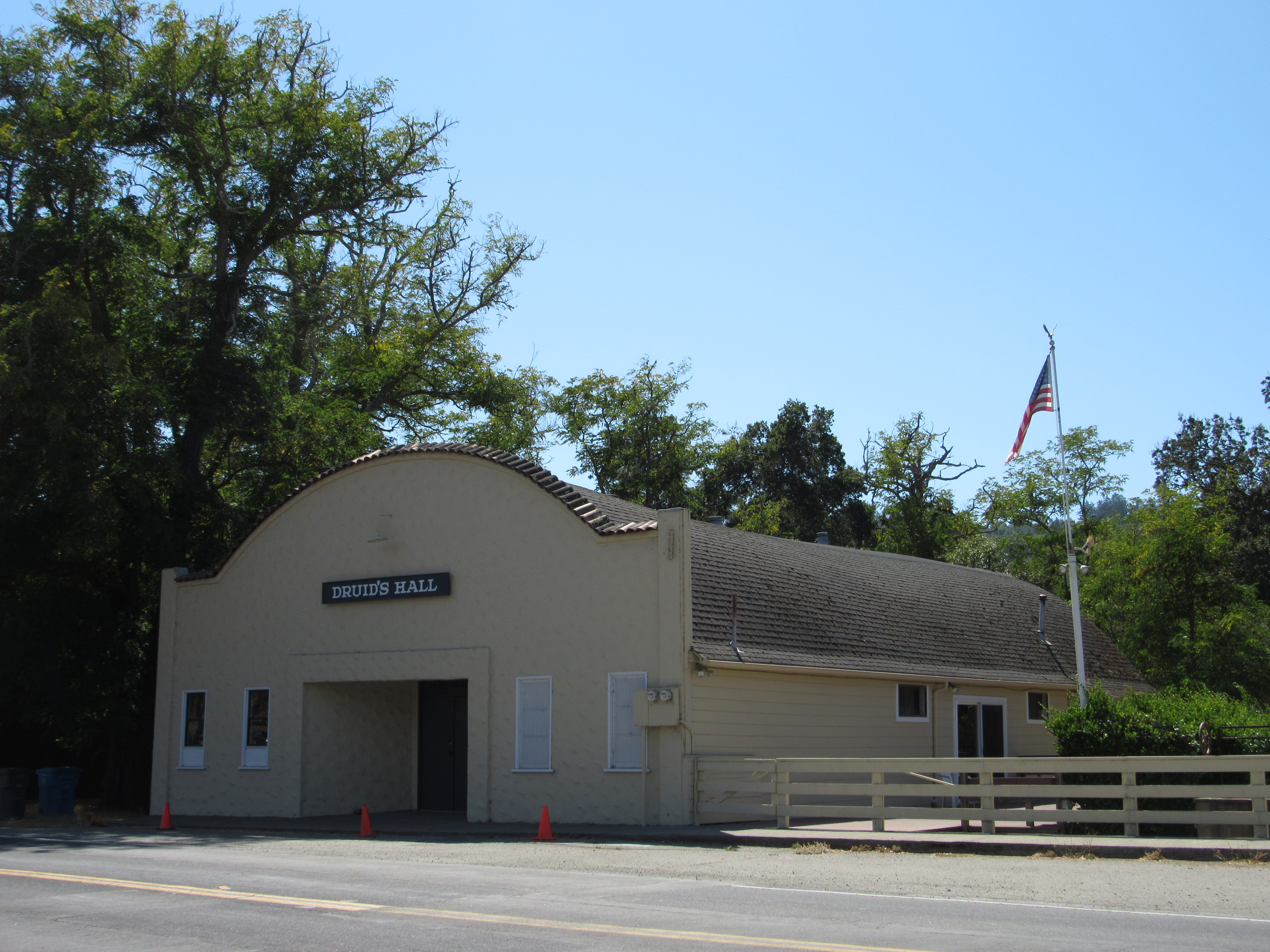
Druid's Hall

== See also ==
- Rancho Nicasio
