= Luis Ovsejevich =

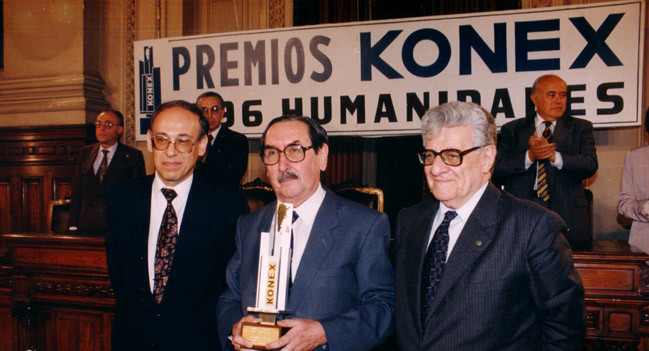
From left: Luis Ovsejevich, Gregorio Klimovsky, and Gregorio Weinberg

Luis Ovsejevich (Buenos Aires, born September 13, 1941) is an Argentine lawyer and businessman, founder and president of the Konex Foundation, from its creation in 1980. Through it the Konex Awards have been granted annually since 1980 to personalities and institutions standing out for his, her or its achievements in 10 different fields. He is a lawyer graduated from the University of Buenos Aires, he exerted teaching from 1962 to 1974 in the Faculty of Law and Faculty of Economic Sciences at the University of Buenos Aires. In the 1960s he was a law professor in University of Buenos Aires and in University of Morón. He also is a piano teacher.

He made various cultural contributions, such as "Let's go to the Music" since 1991, which consist in operas, ballets, concerts, tango and comedy adapted specially for children; he open Konex Cultural City (Ciudad Cultural Konex) in 2005, it is a space where all type of cultural expressions coexist with the objective to contribute to the cultural and artistic enrichment of the community; since 2015 he produce the Konex Festival of Classical Music in Ciudad Cultural Konex.

As a businessman, he is the founder and former president of the Konex-Canon Company from Argentina, created in 1969; in 1998 he transferred the total of the shareholding package to Canon USA.

He was General Director, ad honorem, of the Colón Theater in 1998 and 1999. He was the President of the Rotary Club of Buenos Aires in the 2017-2018 period.

He carried out the project of restoration and renovation of the Auditorium of the University of Buenos Aires, completed in April 2019 with the support of companies and individuals who acted as benefactors.

== Publications ==
- Legítima (1963)
- Mercado común (1964)
- Herederos y Sucesores Universales (1964)
- Pacto de Retroventa (1965)
- Pacto de Reventa (1965)
- Petición de Herencia (1966)
- Posesión de Herencia (1966)
- Revocación de las Donaciones (1968)
- Desarrollo Analítico de Instituciones de Derecho Privado (1968)
- Instituciones de Derecho Privado (1969)
- El consentimiento (1971)
- Invalidez e Ineficacia por Anomalías de la Voluntad (1973)
- Álbum de mi vida (2014), autobiography edited by Eudeba.

== Awards and distinctions ==
In 1997, in recognition of his long career as creator of the Konex Awards (18 years of awards), all those who had been awarded (1800) and jurors (360) up to that point, paid tribute to him at the Teatro Nacional Cervantes. The coordination was carried out by the University of Business and Social Sciences (UCES).

- Mecenas Award 1987 and 2004
- Association of Musical Critics 1991: for being the event of greatest cultural significance.
- Rómulo Raggio Foundation 1993: Medal of Merit for Promoting Argentine Culture.
- Benefactor of National Culture 1997: awarded by the Secretariat of Culture of the Nation.
- ADE Award 2003: Business and Community
- Sol de Plata from the Rotary Club 2004
- Security Award 2008
- Distinction from the Austrian Embassy in Argentina 2011
- Scopus Award from the Hebrew University of Jerusalem in 2011
- Gratia Artis Award from the National Academy of Fine Arts 2016.
- Outstanding Personality in the field of culture by the Buenos Aires Legislature 2023.
- Argentores Award Special Distinction for its support of Culture 2025
- Distinguished Citizen of the City of Buenos Aires 2026.
