= José Vicente Reynafé =

Argentine military man and politician

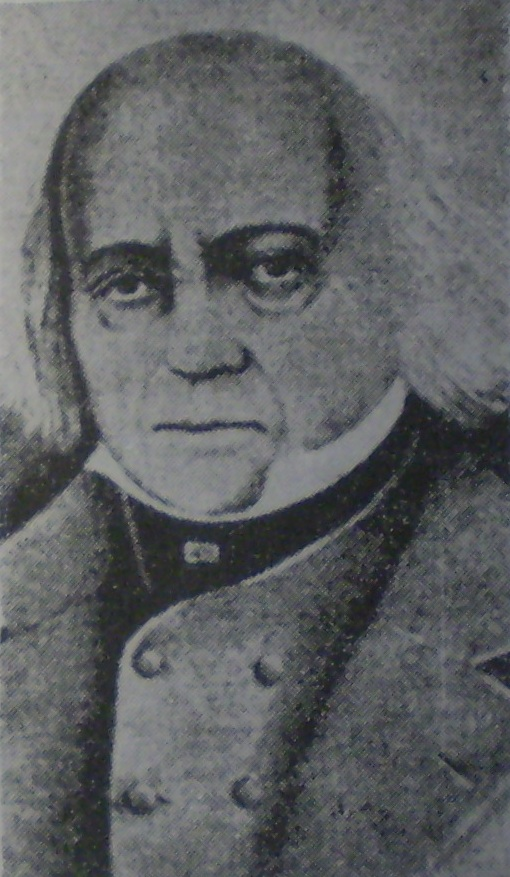

Governor of Córdoba Province, Argentina
- In office 1831–1835
- Preceded by: José Roque Funes
- Succeeded by: Pedro Nolasco Rodríguez

Personal details
- Born: 1782 Córdoba, Argentina
- Died: 1837 (aged 54–55) Buenos Aires, Argentina
- Party: Federalist Party
- Spouse: Francisca Aliaga
- Occupation: Politician
- Profession: Army's officer

Military service
- Rank: Captain
- Unit: Milicias cordobesas
- Battles/wars: Argentine Civil Wars

José Vicente Reynafé (1782–1837) was an Argentine military man and politician, who served as governor of Córdoba, Argentina between 1831 and 1835.

José Vicente Reynafé was born in Villa Tulumba, the son of William Queenfaith, born in Ireland, and Claudia Hidalgo de Torres, belonging to a Creole family. His father was a farmer, who had settled in Córdoba by the year 1770. He changed his surname Queenfaith to Reinafé. José Vicente Reinafé initiated and completed his education in Colegio Nacional de Monserrat. In the National University of Córdoba, he earned a degree in philosophy.

In 1837 José Vicente Reynafé was sentenced to death by order of Juan Manuel de Rosas. He was accused, along with his brothers Francisco, Guillermo and José Antonio Reynafé, for the murder of Facundo Quiroga.
