= Facundo =

Novel by Domingo Faustino Sarmiento

Facundo: Civilization and Barbarism
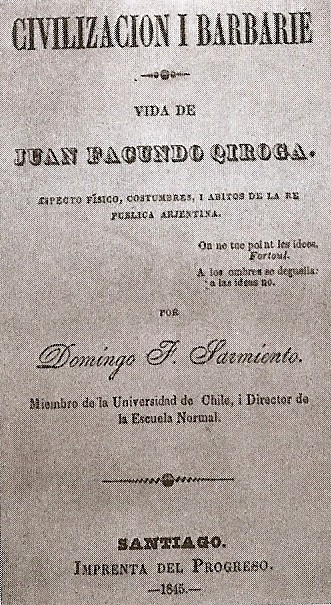
- The cover of the original version from 1845.
- Author: Domingo Faustino Sarmiento
- Original title: Facundo: Civilización y barbarie
- Translator: Mary Mann; Kathleen Ross
- Cover artist: Alberto Nicasio
- Language: Spanish
- Publisher: El Progreso de Chile (first, serial, edition in original Spanish); Hafner (Mary Mann translation, English); University of California Press (Kathleen Ross translation, English)
- Publication date: 1845
- Publication place: Chile
- English publication date: 1868 (Mary Mann translation); 2003 (Kathleen Ross translation)
- Media type: Print
- Pages: 368
- ISBN: 0-520-23980-6
- OCLC: 52312471
- Dewey Decimal: 981/.04 21
- LC Class: F2846 .S247213 2003

Civilization and Barbarism: Life of Juan Facundo Quiroga (original Spanish title in Bello orthography: Civilización i Barbarie: Vida de Juan Facundo Qiroga), later published and better known as Facundo, is a book written in 1845 by Domingo Faustino Sarmiento, a writer and journalist who became the seventh president of Argentina. It is a cornerstone of Latin American literature: a work of creative non-fiction that helped to define the parameters for thinking about the region's development, modernization, power, and culture. Subtitled Civilization and Barbarism, Facundo contrasts civilization and barbarism as seen in early 19th-century Argentina. Literary critic Roberto González Echevarría calls the work "the most important book written by a Latin American in any discipline or genre".

Facundo describes the life of Juan Facundo Quiroga, a caudillo who had terrorized provincial Argentina in the 1820s and 1830s. Kathleen Ross, one of Facundo's English translators, points out that the author also published Facundo to "denounce the tyranny of the Argentine dictator Juan Manuel de Rosas". Juan Manuel de Rosas ruled Argentina from 1829 to 1832 and again from 1835 to 1852; it was because of Rosas that Sarmiento was in exile in Chile, where he wrote the book. Sarmiento sees Rosas as heir to Facundo: both are caudillos and representatives of a barbarism that derives from the nature of the Argentine countryside. As Ross explains, Sarmiento's book is therefore engaged in describing the "Argentine national character, explaining the effects of Argentina's geographical conditions on personality, the 'barbaric' nature of the countryside versus the 'civilizing' influence of the city, and the great future awaiting Argentina when it opened its doors wide to European immigration".

Throughout the text, Sarmiento explores the dichotomy between civilization and barbarism. As Kimberly Ball observes, "civilization is identified with northern Europe, North America, cities, Unitarians, Paz, and Rivadavia", while "barbarism is identified with Latin America, Spain, Asia, the Middle East, the countryside, Federalists, Facundo, and Rosas". It is in the way that Facundo articulates this opposition that Sarmiento's book has had such a profound influence. In the words of González Echevarría: "in proposing the dialectic between civilization and barbarism as the central conflict in Latin American culture Facundo gave shape to a polemic that began in the colonial period and continues to the present day".

The first edition of Facundo was published in installments in 1845. Sarmiento removed the last two chapters of the second edition (1851), but restored them in the 1874 edition, deciding that they were important to the book's development.

The first translation into English, by Mary Tyler Peabody Mann, was published in 1868. A modern and complete translation by Kathleen Ross appeared in 2003 from the University of California Press.

== Background ==
While exiled in Chile, Sarmiento wrote Facundo in 1845 as an attack on Juan Manuel de Rosas, the Argentine dictator at the time. The book was a critical analysis of Argentine culture as he saw it, represented in men such as Rosas and the regional leader Juan Facundo Quiroga, a warlord from La Rioja. For Sarmiento, Rosas and Quiroga were caudillos—strongmen who did not submit to the law. However, if Facundo's portrait is linked to the wild nature of the countryside, Rosas is depicted as an opportunist who exploits the situation to perpetuate himself in power.

Sarmiento's book is a critique and also a symptom of Argentina's cultural conflicts. In 1810, the country had gained independence from the Spanish Empire, but Sarmiento complains that Argentina had yet to cohere as a unified entity. The country's chief political division saw the Unitarists (or Unitarians, with whom Sarmiento sided), who favored centralization, counterposed against the Federalists, who believed that the regions should maintain a good measure of autonomy. This division was in part a split between the city and the countryside. Then as now, Buenos Aires was the country's largest and wealthiest city as a result of its access to river trade routes and the South Atlantic. Buenos Aires was exposed not only to trade but to fresh ideas and European culture. These economic and cultural differences caused tension between Buenos Aires and the land-locked regions of the country. Despite his Unitarian sympathies, Sarmiento himself came from the provinces, a native of the Western town of San Juan.

=== Argentine civil war ===
Argentina's divisions led to a civil war that began in 1814. A frail agreement was reached in the early 1820s, which led to the unification of the Republic just in time to wage the Cisplatine War against the Empire of Brazil, but the relations between the Provinces reached again the point of breaking-off in 1826, when Unitarist Bernardino Rivadavia was elected president and tried to enforce a newly enacted centralist Constitution. Supporters of decentralized government challenged the Unitarist Party, leading to the outbreak of violence. Federalists Juan Facundo Quiroga and Manuel Dorrego wanted more autonomy for the provinces and were inclined to reject European culture. The Unitarists defended Rivadavia's presidency, as it created educational opportunities for rural inhabitants through a European-staffed university program. However, under Rivadavia's rule, the salaries of common laborers were subjected to government wage ceilings, and the gauchos ("cattle-wrangling horsemen of the pampas") were either imprisoned or forced to work without pay.

A series of governors were installed and replaced beginning in 1828 with the appointment of Federalist Manuel Dorrego as the governor of Buenos Aires. However, Dorrego's government was very soon overthrown and replaced by that of Unitarist Juan Lavalle. Lavalle's rule ended when he was defeated by a militia of gauchos led by Rosas. By the end of 1829, the legislature had appointed Rosas as governor of Buenos Aires. Under Rosas's rule, many intellectuals fled either to Chile, as did Sarmiento, or to Uruguay, as Sarmiento himself notes.

=== Juan Manuel de Rosas ===
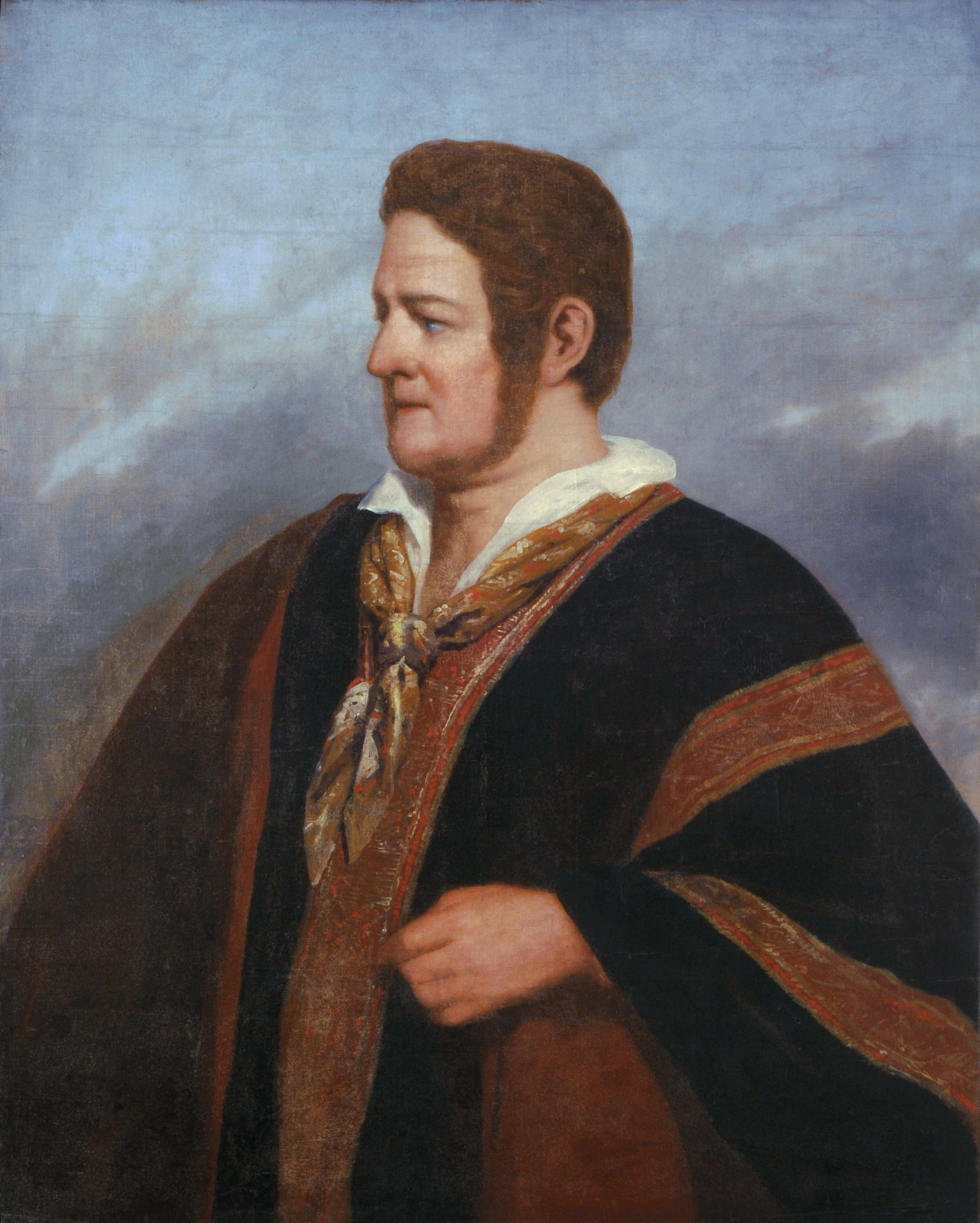
Portrait of Rosas by Raymond Monvoisin

According to Latin American historian John Lynch, Juan Manuel de Rosas was "a landowner, a rural caudillo, and the dictator of Buenos Aires from 1829 to 1852". He was born into a wealthy family of high social status, but Rosas's strict upbringing had a deep psychological influence on him. Sarmiento asserts that because of Rosas's mother, "the spectacle of authority and servitude must have left lasting impressions on him". Shortly after reaching puberty, Rosas was sent to an estancia and stayed there for about thirty years. In time, he learned how to manage the ranch and he established an authoritarian government in the area. While in power, Rosas incarcerated residents for unspecified reasons, acts which Sarmiento argues were similar to Rosas's treatment of cattle. Sarmiento argues that this was one method of making his citizens like the "tamest, most orderly cattle known".

Juan Manuel de Rosas's first term as governor lasted only three years. His rule, assisted by Juan Facundo Quiroga and Estanislao López, was respected and he was praised for his ability to maintain harmony between Buenos Aires and the rural areas. The country fell into disorder after Rosas's resignation in 1832, and in 1835 he was once again called to lead the country. He ruled the country not as he did during his first term as governor, but as a dictator, forcing all citizens to support his Federalist regime. According to Nicolas Shumway, Rosas "forced the citizens to wear the red Federalist insignia, and his picture appeared in all public places... Rosas's enemies, real and imagined, were increasingly imprisoned, tortured, murdered, or driven into exile by the mazorca, a band of spies and thugs supervised personally by Rosas. Publications were censored, and porteño newspapers became tedious apologizers for the regime".

=== Domingo Faustino Sarmiento ===
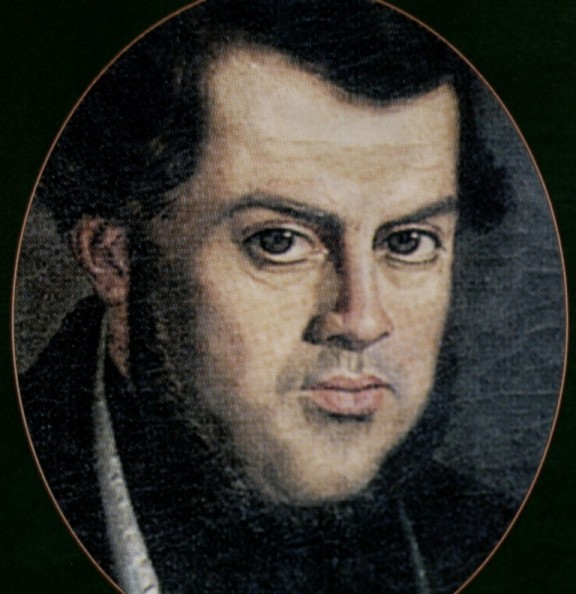
Portrait of Sarmiento at the time of his exile in Chile; by Franklin Rawson

In Facundo, Sarmiento is both the narrator and a main character. The book contains autobiographical elements from Sarmiento's life, and he comments on the entire Argentine circumstance. He also expresses and analyzes his own opinion and chronicles some historic events. Within the book's dichotomy between civilization and barbarism, Sarmiento's character represents civilization, steeped as he is in European and North American ideas; he stands for education and development, as opposed to Rosas and Facundo, who symbolize barbarism.

Sarmiento was an educator, a civilized man who was a militant adherent to the Unitarist movement. During the Argentine civil war he fought against Facundo several times, and while in Spain he became a member of the Literary Society of Professors. Exiled to Chile by Rosas when he started to write Facundo, Sarmiento would later return as a politician. He was a member of the Senate after Rosas's fall and president of Argentina for six years (1868–1874). During his presidency, Sarmiento concentrated on migration, sciences, and culture. His ideas were based on European civilization; for him, the development of a country was rooted in education. To this end, he founded Argentina's military and naval colleges.

== Synopsis ==
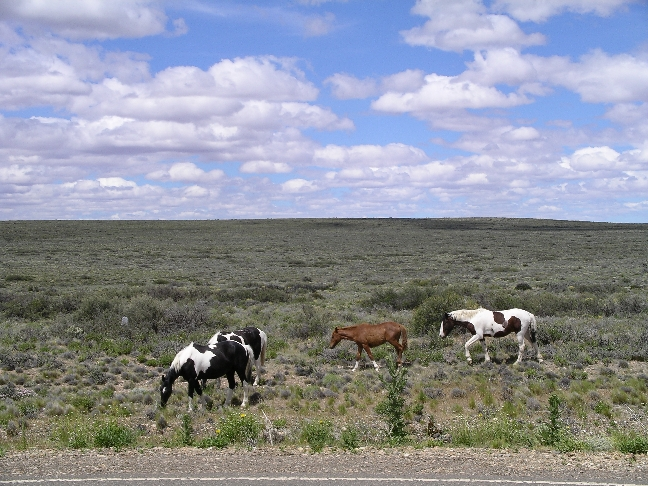
The Argentine plains, or pampas. For Sarmiento, this bleak, featureless geography was a key factor in Argentina's "failure" to achieve civilization by the mid-19th century.

After a lengthy introduction, Facundo's fifteen chapters divide broadly into three sections: chapters one to four outline Argentine geography, anthropology, and history; chapters five to fourteen recount the life of Juan Facundo Quiroga; and the concluding chapter expounds Sarmiento's vision of a future for Argentina under a Unitarist government. In Sarmiento's words, the reason why he chose to provide Argentine context and use Facundo Quiroga to condemn Rosas's dictatorship is that "in Facundo Quiroga I do not only see simply a caudillo, but rather a manifestation of Argentine life as it has been made by colonization and the peculiarities of the land".

=== Argentine context ===
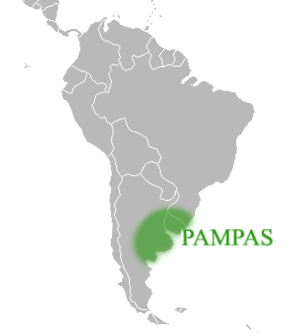
South America, showing the extent of the pampas in Argentina, Uruguay and southern Brazil

Facundo begins with a geographical description of Argentina, from the Andes in the west to the eastern Atlantic coast, where two main river systems converge at the boundary between Argentina and Uruguay. This river estuary, called the Río de la Plata, is the location of Buenos Aires, the capital. Through his discussion of Argentina's geography, Sarmiento demonstrates Buenos Aires' advantages; the river systems were communications arteries which, by enabling trade, helped the city to achieve civilization. Buenos Aires failed to spread civilization to the rural areas and as a result, much of the rest of Argentina was doomed to barbarism. Sarmiento also argues that the pampas, Argentina's wide and empty plains, provided "no place for people to escape and hide for defense and this prohibits civilization in most parts of Argentina". Despite the barriers to civilization caused by Argentina's geography, Sarmiento argues that many of the country's problems were caused by gauchos like Juan Manuel de Rosas, who were barbaric, uneducated, ignorant, and arrogant; their character prevented Argentine society's progress toward civilization. Sarmiento then describes the four main types of gaucho, and these characterizations aid in understanding Argentine leaders such as Juan Manuel de Rosas. Sarmiento argues that, without an understanding of these Argentine character types, "it is impossible to understand our political personages, or the primordial, American character of the bloody struggle that tears apart the Argentine Republic".

Sarmiento then moves on to the Argentine peasants, who are "independent of all need, free of all subjection, with no idea of government". The peasants gather at taverns, where they spend their time drinking and gambling. They display their eagerness to prove their physical strength with horsemanship and knife fights. Rarely these displays led to deaths, and Sarmiento notes that Rosas's residence was sometimes used as a refuge on such occasions, before he became politically powerful.

According to Sarmiento, these elements are crucial to an understanding of the Argentine Revolution, in which Argentina gained independence from Spain. Although Argentina's war of independence was prompted by the influence of European ideas, Buenos Aires was the only city that could achieve civilization. Rural people participated in the war to demonstrate their physical strengths rather than because they wanted to civilize the country. In the end, the revolution was a failure because the barbaric instincts of the rural population led to the loss and dishonor of the civilized city—Buenos Aires.

=== Life of Juan Facundo Quiroga ===
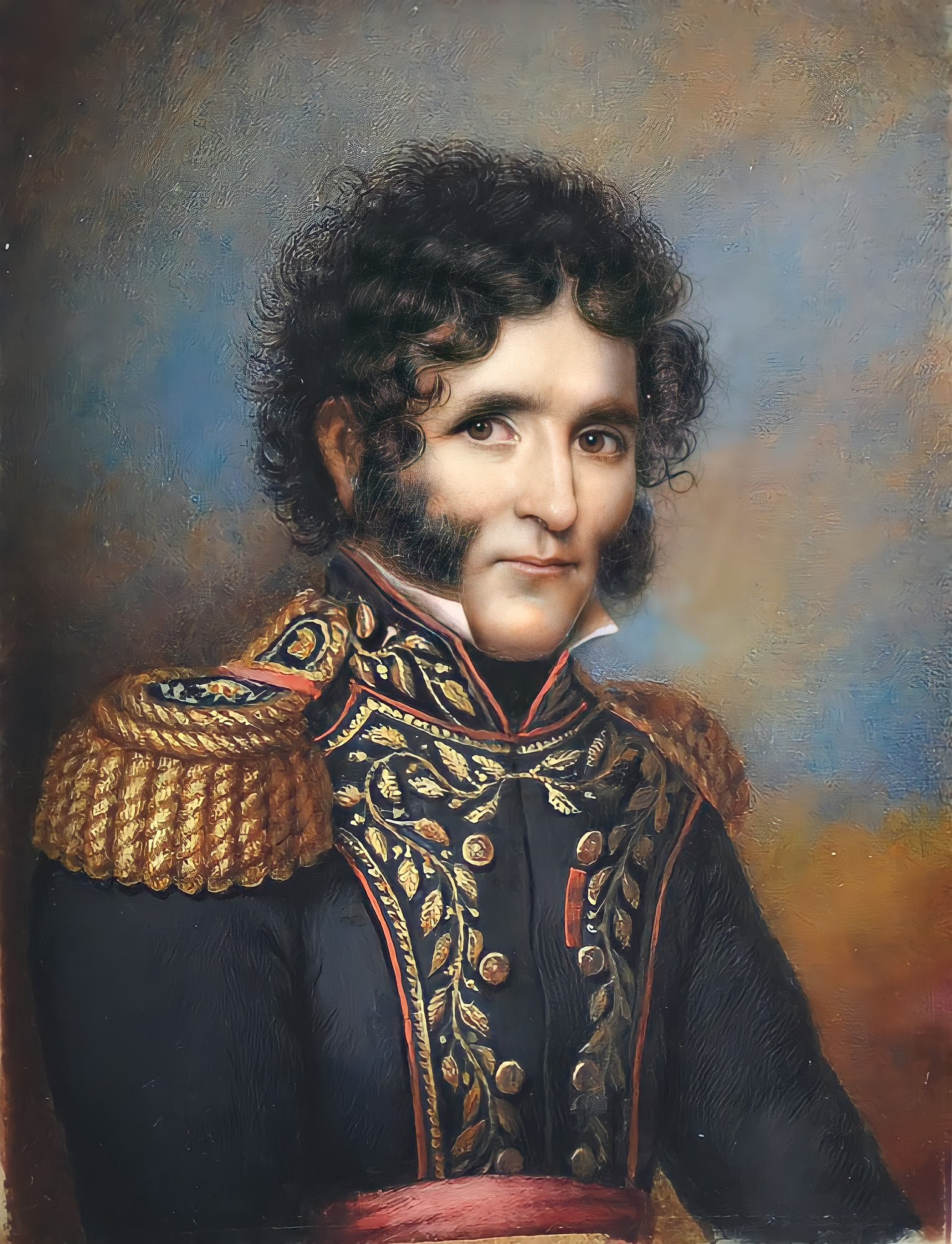
Juan Facundo Quiroga (portrait by Fernando García del Molino)

As the central character of Sarmiento's Facundo, he represents barbarism, the antithesis of civilization. The second section of Facundo explores the life of its titular character, Juan Facundo Quiroga—the "Tiger of the Plains". Despite being born into a wealthy family, Facundo received only a basic education in reading and writing. He loved gambling, being called el jugador (the player)—in fact, Sarmiento describes his gambling as "an ardent passion burning in his belly". As a youth Facundo was antisocial and rebellious, refusing to mix with other children, and these traits became more pronounced as he matured. Sarmiento describes an incident in which Facundo killed a man, writing that this type of behaviour "marked his passage through the world". Sarmiento gives a physical description of the man he considers to personify the caudillo: "[he had a] short and well built stature; his broad shoulders supported, on a short neck, a well-formed head covered with very thick, black and curly hair", with "eyes ... full of fire".

Facundo's relations with his family eventually broke down, and, taking on the life of a gaucho, he joined the caudillos in the province of Entre Ríos. His killing of two royalist prisoners after a jailbreak saw him acclaimed as a hero among the gauchos, and on relocating to La Rioja, Facundo was appointed to a leadership position in the Llanos Militia. He built his reputation and won his comrades' respect through his fierce battlefield performances, but hated and tried to destroy those who differed from him by being civilized and well-educated.

In 1825, when Unitarist Bernardino Rivadavia became the governor of the Buenos Aires province, he held a meeting with representatives from all provinces in Argentina. Facundo was present as the governor of La Rioja. Rivadavia was soon overthrown, and Manuel Dorrego became the new governor. Sarmiento contends that Dorrego, a Federalist, was interested neither in social progress nor in ending barbaric behaviour in Argentina by improving the level of civilization and education of its rural inhabitants. In the turmoil that characterized Argentine politics at the time, Dorrego was assassinated by Unitarists and Facundo was defeated by Unitarist General José María Paz. Facundo escaped to Buenos Aires and joined the Federalist government of Juan Manuel de Rosas. During the ensuing civil war between the two ideologies, Facundo conquered the provinces of San Luis, Córdoba and Mendoza.

On return to his San Juan home, which Sarmiento says Facundo governed "solely with his terrifying name", he realized that his government lacked support from Rosas. He went to Buenos Aires to confront Rosas, who sent him on another political mission. On his way back, Facundo was shot and killed at Barranca Yaco, Córdoba. According to Sarmiento, the murder was plotted by Rosas: "An impartial history still awaits facts and revelations, in order to point its finger at the instigator of the assassins".

=== Consequences of Facundo's death ===
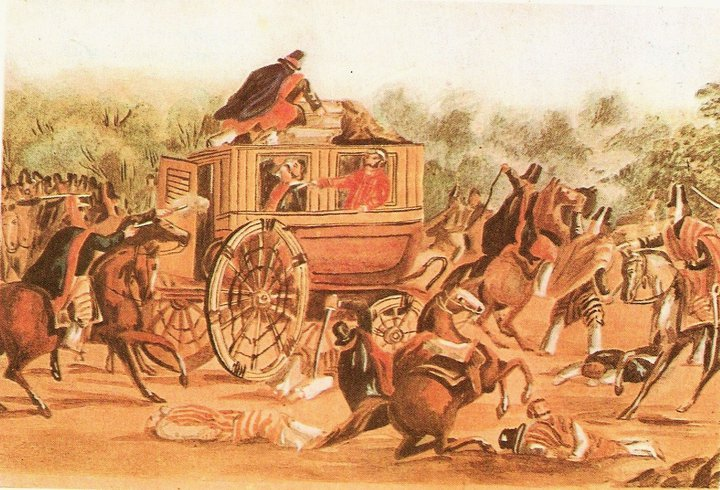
Assassination of Facundo Quiroga at Barranca Yaco

In the book's final chapters, Sarmiento explores the consequences of Facundo's death for the history and politics of the Argentine Republic. He further analyzes Rosas's government and personality, commenting on dictatorship, tyranny, the role of popular support, and the use of force to maintain order. Sarmiento criticizes Rosas by using the words of the dictator, making sarcastic remarks about Rosas's actions, and describing the "terror" established during the dictatorship, the contradictions of the government, and the situation in the provinces that were ruled by Facundo. Sarmiento writes, "The red ribbon is a materialization of the terror that accompanies you everywhere, in the streets, in the bosom of the family; it must be thought about when dressing, when undressing, and ideas are always engraved upon us by association".

Finally, Sarmiento examines the legacy of Rosas's government by attacking the dictator and widening the civilization–barbarism dichotomy. By setting France against Argentina—representing civilization and barbarism respectively—Sarmiento contrasts culture and savagery:

France's blockade had lasted for two years, and the 'American' government, inspired by 'American' spirit, was facing off with France, European principles, European pretensions. The social results of the French blockade, however, had been fruitful for the Argentine Republic, and served to demonstrate in all their nakedness the current state of mind and the new elements of struggle, which were to ignite a fierce war that can end only with the fall of that monstrous government.

== Genre and style ==
Spanish critic and philosopher Miguel de Unamuno comments of the book, "I never took Facundo by Sarmiento as a historical work, nor do I think it can be very valued in that regard. I always thought of it as a literary work, as a historical novel". However, Facundo cannot be classified as a novel or a specific genre of literature. According to González Echevarría, the book is at once an "essay, biography, autobiography, novel, epic, memoir, confession, political pamphlet, diatribe, scientific treatise, [and] travelogue". Sarmiento's style and his exploration of the life of Facundo unify the three distinct parts of his work. Even the first section, describing Argentina's geography, follows this pattern, since Sarmiento contends that Facundo is a natural product of this environment.

The book is partly fictional, as well: Sarmiento draws on his imagination in addition to historical fact in describing Rosas. In Facundo, Sarmiento outlines his argument that Rosas's dictatorship is the main cause of Argentina's problems. The themes of barbarism and savagery that run through the book are, to Sarmiento, consequences of Rosas's dictatorial government. To make his case, Sarmiento often has recourse to strategies drawn from literature.

== Themes ==
=== Civilization and barbarism ===
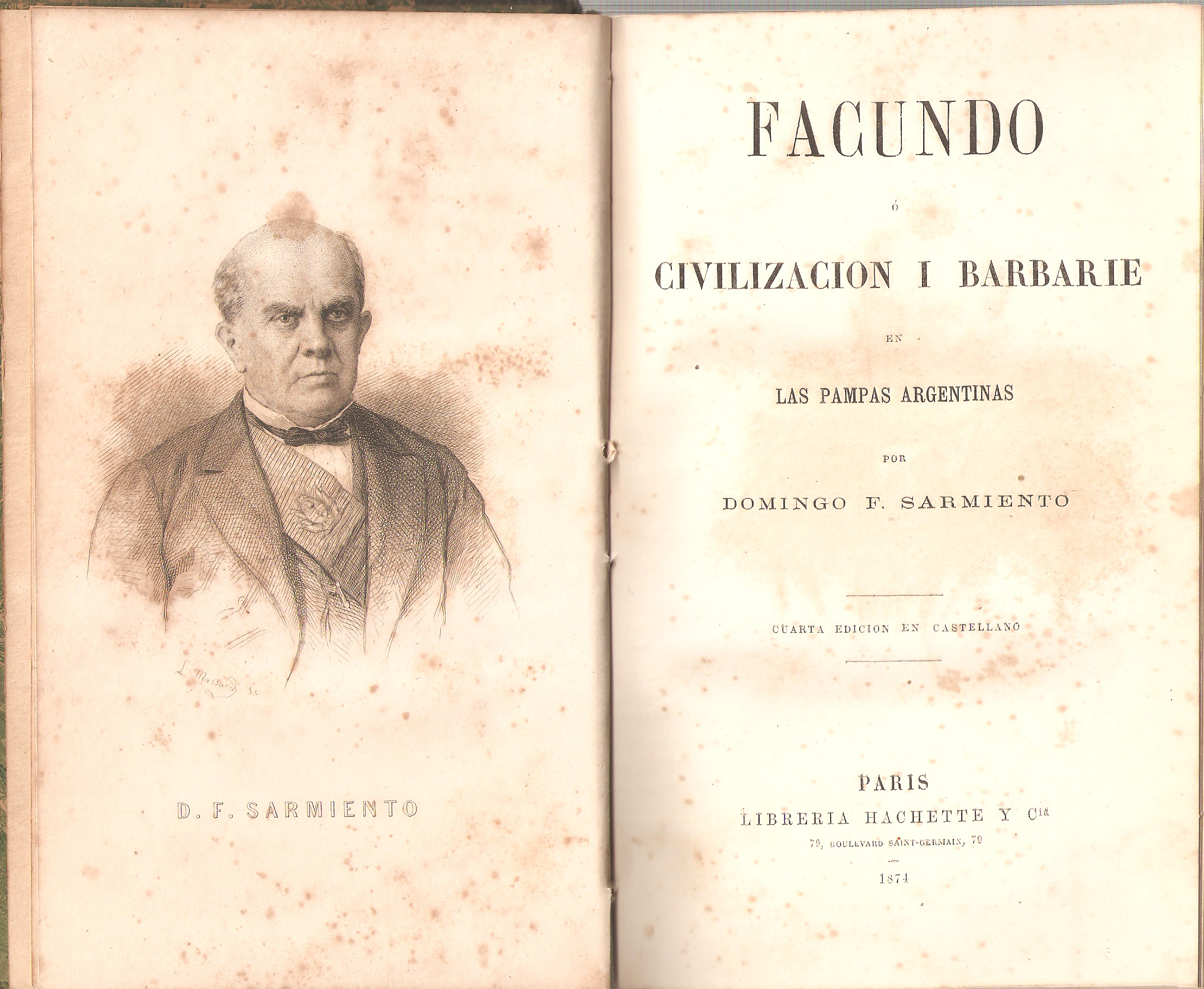
4th edition in Spanish. Paris, 1874.

Facundo is not only a critique of Rosas's dictatorship, but a broader investigation into Argentine history and culture, which Sarmiento charts through the rise, controversial rule, and downfall of Juan Facundo Quiroga, an archetypical Argentine caudillo. Sarmiento summarizes the book's message in the phrase "That is the point: to be or not to be savages". The dichotomy between civilization and barbarism is the book's central idea; Facundo Quiroga is portrayed as wild, untamed, and standing opposed to true progress through his rejection of European cultural ideals—found at that time in the metropolitan society of Buenos Aires.

The conflict between civilization and barbarism mirrors Latin America's difficulties in the post-Independence era. Literary critic Sorensen Goodrich argues that although Sarmiento was not the first to articulate this dichotomy, he forged it into a powerful and prominent theme that would impact Latin American literature. He explores the issue of civilization versus the cruder aspects of a caudillo culture of brutality and absolute power. Facundo set forth an oppositional message that promoted a more beneficial alternative for society at large. Although Sarmiento advocated various changes, such as honest officials who understood enlightenment ideas of European and Classical origin, for him education was the key. Caudillos like Facundo Quiroga are seen, at the beginning of the book, as the antithesis of education, high culture, and civil stability; barbarism was like a never ending litany of social ills. They are the agents of instability and chaos, destroying societies through their blatant disregard for humanity and social progress.

If Sarmiento viewed himself as civilized, Rosas was barbaric. Historian David Rock argues that "contemporary opponents reviled Rosas as a bloody tyrant and a symbol of barbarism". Sarmiento attacked Rosas through his book by promoting education and "civilized" status, whereas Rosas used political power and brute force to dispose of any kind of hindrance. In linking Europe with civilization, and civilization with education, Sarmiento conveyed an admiration of European culture and civilization which at the same time gave him a sense of dissatisfaction with his own culture, motivating him to drive it towards civilization. Using the wilderness of the pampas to reinforce his social analysis, he characterizes those who were isolated and opposed to political dialogue as ignorant and anarchic—symbolized by Argentina's desolate physical geography. Conversely, Latin America was connected to barbarism, which Sarmiento used mainly to illustrate the way in which Argentina was disconnected from the numerous resources surrounding it, limiting the growth of the country.

American critic Doris Sommer sees a connection between Facundo's ideology and Sarmiento's readings of Fenimore Cooper. She links Sarmiento's remarks on modernization and culture to the American discourse of expansion and progress of the 19th century.

=== Writing and power ===
In the history of post-independence Latin America, dictatorships have been relatively common—examples range from Paraguay's José Gaspar Rodríguez de Francia in the 19th century to Chile's Augusto Pinochet in the 20th. In this context, Latin American literature has been distinguished by the protest novel, or dictator novel; the main story is based around the dictator figure, his behaviour, characteristics and the situation of the people under his regime. Writers such as Sarmiento used the power of the written word in order to criticize government, using literature as a tool, an instance of resistance and as a weapon against repression.

Making use of the connection between writing and power was one of Sarmiento's strategies. For him, writing was intended to be a catalyst for action. While the gauchos fought with physical weapons, Sarmiento used his voice and language. Sorensen states that Sarmiento used "text as [a] weapon". Sarmiento was writing not only for Argentina but for a wider audience too, especially the United States and Europe; in his view, these regions were close to civilization; his purpose was to seduce his readers toward his own political viewpoint. In the numerous translations of Facundo, Sarmiento's association of writing with power and conquest is apparent.

Since his books often serve as vehicles for his political manifesto, Sarmiento's writings commonly mock governments, with Facundo being the most prominent example. He elevates his own status at the expense of the ruling elite, almost portraying himself as invincible due to the power of writing. Toward the end of 1840, Sarmiento was exiled for his political views. Covered with bruises received the day before from unruly soldiers, he wrote in French, "On ne tue point les idées" (misquoted from "on ne tire pas des coups de fusil aux idées", which means "ideas cannot be killed by guns"). The government decided to decipher the message, and on learning the translation, said, "So! What does this mean?". With the failure of his oppressors to understand his meaning, Sarmiento is able to illustrate their ineptitude. His words are presented as a "code" that needs to be "deciphered", and unlike Sarmiento those in power are barbaric and uneducated. Their bafflement not only demonstrates their general ignorance, but also, according to Sorensen, illustrates "the fundamental displacement which any cultural transplantation brings about", since Argentine rural inhabitants and Rosas's associates were unable to accept the civilized culture which Sarmiento believed would lead to progress in Argentina.

== Legacy ==
For translator Kathleen Ross, Facundo is "one of the foundational works of Spanish American literary history". It has been enormously influential in setting out a "blueprint for modernization", with its practical message enhanced by a "tremendous beauty and passion". However, according to literary critic González Echevarría it is not only a powerful founding text but "the first Latin American classic, and the most important book written about Latin America by a Latin American in any discipline or genre". The book's political influence can be seen in Sarmiento's eventual rise to power. He became president of Argentina in 1868 and was able to apply his theories to ensure that his nation achieved civilization. Although Sarmiento wrote several books, he viewed Facundo as authorizing his political views.

According to Sorensen, "early readers of Facundo were deeply influenced by the struggles that preceded and followed Rosas's dictatorship, and their views sprang from their relationship to the strife for interpretive and political hegemony". González Echevarría notes that Facundo provided the impetus for other writers to examine dictatorship in Latin America, and contends that it is still read today because Sarmiento created "a voice for modern Latin American authors". The reason for this, according to González Echevarría, is that "Latin American authors struggle with its legacy, rewriting Facundo in their works even as they try to untangle themselves from its discourse". Subsequent dictator novels, such as El Señor Presidente by Miguel Ángel Asturias or The Feast of the Goat by Mario Vargas Llosa, drew upon its ideas, and a knowledge of Facundo enhances the reader's understanding of these later books.

One irony of the impact of Sarmiento's essay genre and fictional literature is that, according to González Echevarría, the gaucho has become "an object of nostalgia, a lost origin around which to build a national mythology". While Sarmiento was trying to eliminate the gaucho, he also transformed him into a "national symbol". González Echevarría further argues that Juan Facundo Quiroga also continues to exist, since he represents "our unresolved struggle between good and evil, and our lives' inexorable drive toward death". According to translator Kathleen Ross, "Facundo continues to inspire controversy and debate because it contributes to national myths of modernization, anti-populism, and racist ideology".

== Publication and translation history ==
The first edition of Facundo was published in instalments in 1845, in the literary supplement of the Chilean newspaper El Progreso. The second edition, also published in Chile (in 1851), contained significant alterations—Sarmiento removed the last two chapters on the advice of Valentín Alsina, an exiled Argentinian lawyer and politician. However, the missing sections reappeared in 1874 in a later edition, because Sarmiento saw them as crucial to the book's development.

Facundo was first translated in 1868, by Mary Mann, a friend of Sarmiento, with the title Life in the Argentine Republic in the Days of the Tyrants; or, Civilization and Barbarism. More recently, Kathleen Ross has undertaken a modern and complete translation, published in 2003 by the University of California Press. In Ross's "Translator's Introduction", she notes that Mann's 19th-century version of the text was influenced by Mann's friendship with Sarmiento and by the fact that he was at the time a candidate in the Argentine presidential election: "Mann wished to further her friend's cause abroad by presenting Sarmiento as an admirer and emulator of United States political and cultural institutions". Hence Mann's translation cut much of what made Sarmiento's work distinctively part of the Hispanic tradition. Ross continues: "Mann's elimination of metaphor, the stylistic device perhaps most characteristic of Sarmiento's prose, is especially striking".
