= Konex Foundation =

Argentine cultural non-profit organization

Konex Foundation (Fundación Konex) is an Argentine cultural non-profit organization created in 1980 "to promote, stimulate, help, and participate in any form of cultural, educational, intellectual, artistic, social, philanthropic, scientific or sports initiative, work, and enterprise, in their most relevant aspects", as defined by its founder and president, Dr. Luis Ovsejevich.

The Konex Foundation provides scholarships and individual grants and also sponsors and stimulates group activities through subsidies and assistance to meritorious ideas and enterprises.

== Konex Awards ==
The Konex Awards, also created in 1980, were conceived as a way to reward and stimulate Argentine personalities and institutions of different fields.

The awards are given out every year to different fields on a 10-year rotating cycle. The rotation order is: Sports, Entertainment, Visual Arts, Science and Technology, Literature, Popular Music, Humanities, Communication-Journalism, Institutions-Communities-Companies, and Classical Music.

== Foundation's activities in the area of classical music ==
Among the foundation's activities there's a program to promote amongst young people different cultural expression such as opera, ballet and classical music, in adapted version.

== Other activities of the Foundation ==
The Foundation also supports different science projects and plastic artistic activities, holds painting exhibitions and has its own collection.

The Ciudad Cultural Konex venue hosts music and arts events organized by the Konex Foundation, from classical music to contemporaneous percussion group La bomba de tiempo.

== See also ==
- Francisco Ernesto Baralle
- Marcelo Bonevardi
- Jorge Cumbo
- Darío Sztajnszrajber
