= Alberto Nicasio =

Argentine artist (1902–1980)

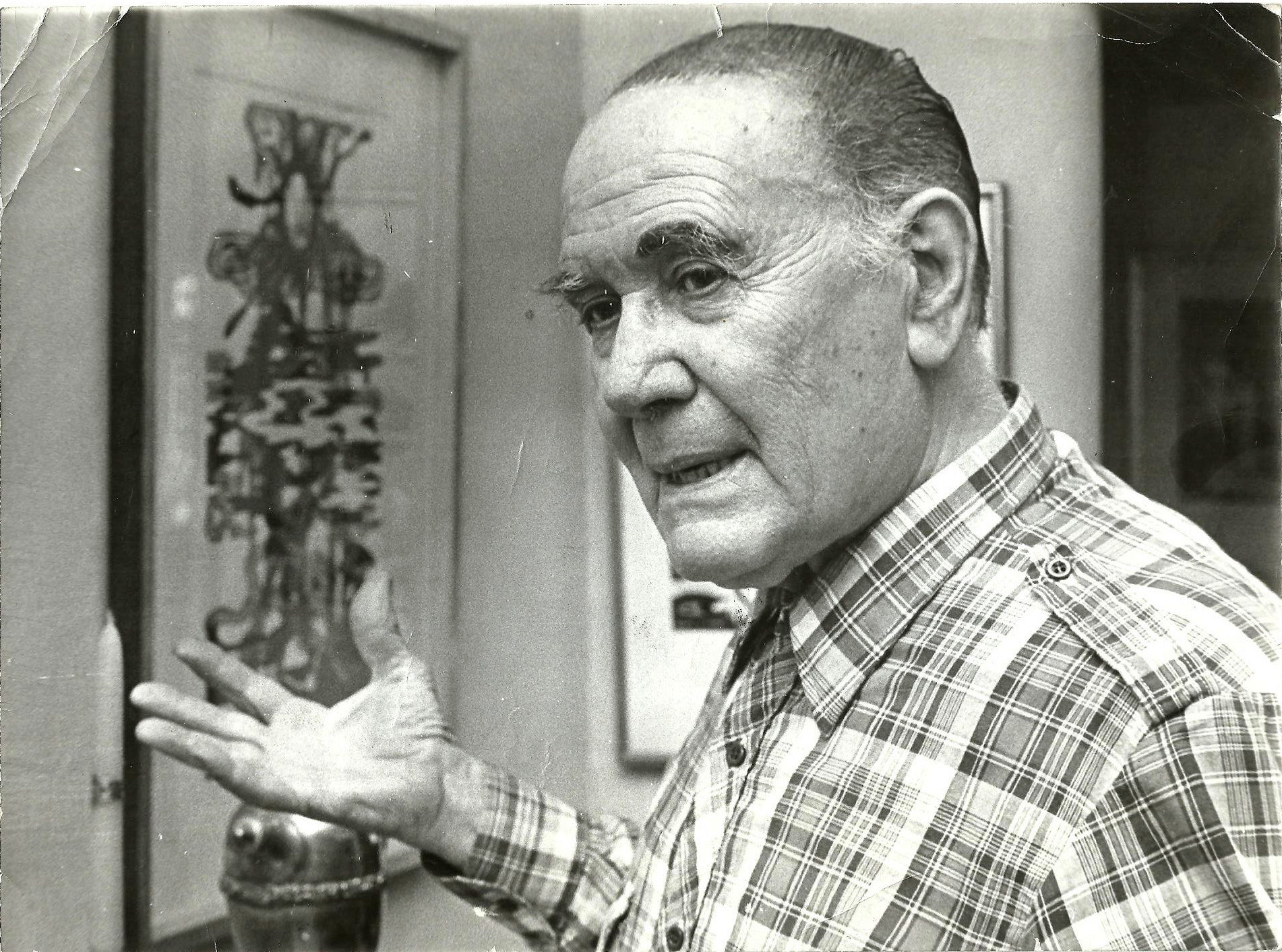
- Born: Alberto Nicasio; 10 August 1902; Marseille, France
- Died: 4 July 1980 (aged 77); Córdoba, Argentina
- Known for: Painting, Engraving, Illustration

Alberto Nicasio (August 10, 1902 – July 4, 1980) was an Argentine artist (xylographer) and educator. He was a member of the Argentinian National Academy of Arts. A street in the city of Córdoba and a primary school in the province are named after him.

== Biography ==
Alberto Nicasio was born in Marseille, France, on 10 August 1902, the son of Alfredo Nicasio and Eugenia Lasserre. As a young child, his parents decided to settle in the city of Oran, Algeria (then French territory); but due to the outbreak of the First World War, the family decided to emigrate to Argentina in 1916, finally settling in the city of Córdoba. There, Nicasio trained in drawing and painting at the Provincial School of Fine Arts with masters such as Emiliano Gómez Clara, Manuel Cardeñosa and Carlos Camiloni, and then began to study the technique of wood engraving. He married María Elena Las Heras in 1930; they had two daughters, María Elena and Carmen Olga.

As an artist, he participated in biennials in São Paulo, Mexico and Switzerland; he also participated in group exhibitions in the United States, Japan, Belgium, the Vatican, Spain, Chile, Uruguay and Brazil. He illustrated various books, such as Sarmiento's Facundo, José Hernández's Martín Fierro, Adonais, Percy Shelley's elegy and 30 woodcuts on William Henry Hudson's Tierra Purpúrea, among others. A number of exhibitions of his work were held posthumously.

== Description of his work ==
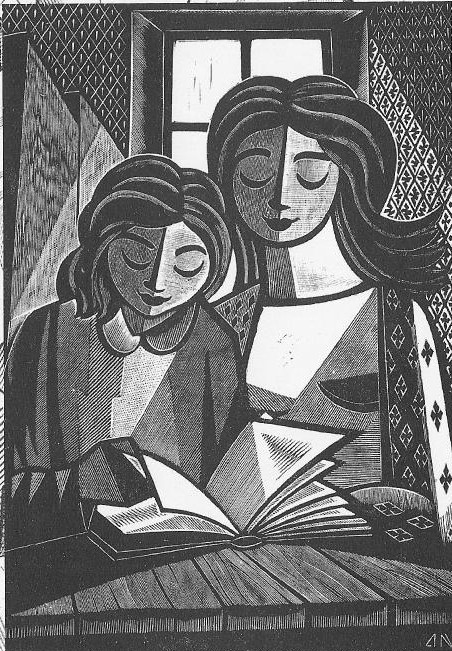
"Lectoras" (Readers), xylography by Alberto Nicasio, 1954

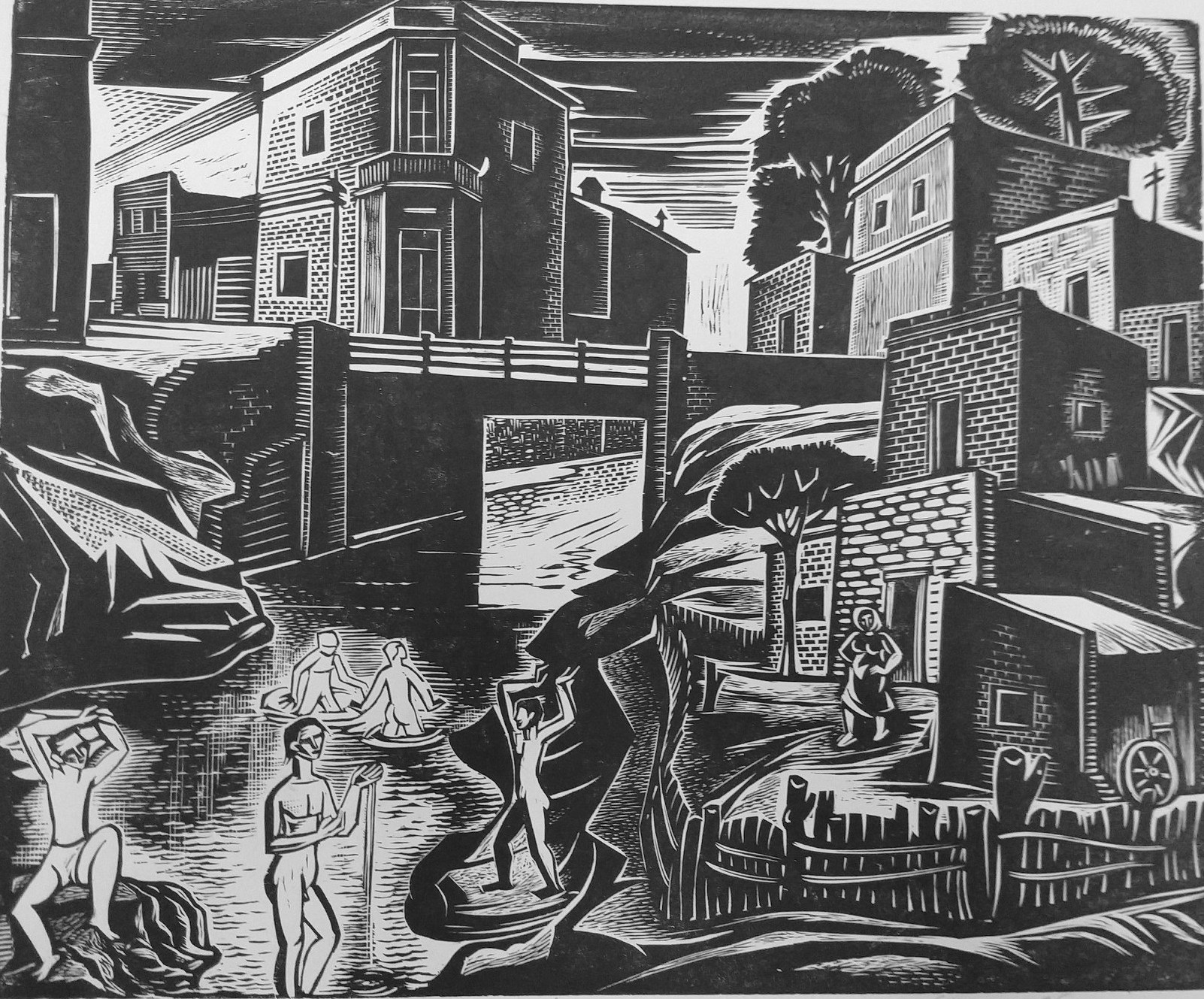
"Suburbio cordobés" (Suburbs of Córdoba), xylography by Alberto Nicasio, 1956

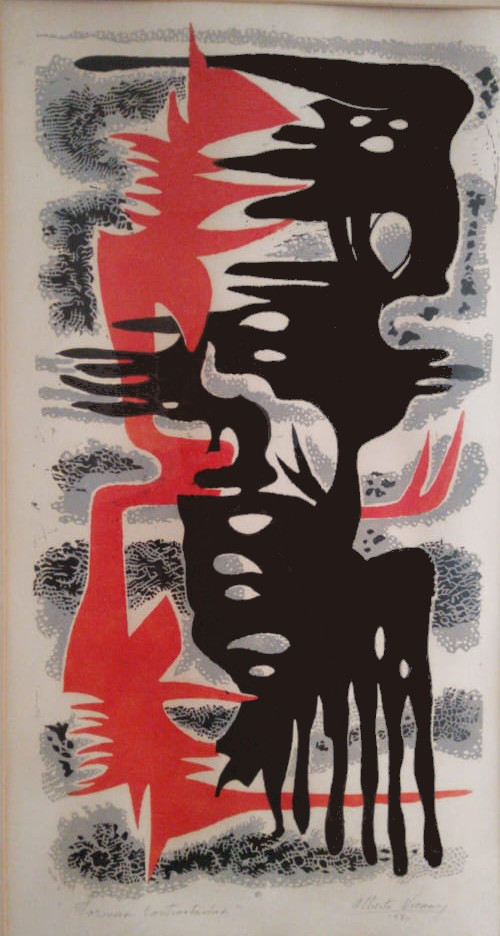
"Formas contrastadas" (Contrasted shapes), polychrome xylography by Alberto Nicasio, 1970

Nicasio began experimenting with drawing and oil painting, and took part in group exhibitions in 1927 and 1928. Later, however, he abandoned his period as a painter and transitioned to woodcut, to which he dedicated the rest of his life.

Nicasio's oeuvre can be divided into periods in which his art varied. The first period was marked by a figurative character, depicting urban and suburban landscapes of Córdoba. These early engravings show the façades of buildings symbolic of Córdoba's colonial period, such as the Cathedral of Córdoba, or the buildings of the complex known as La Manzana Jesuítica, which includes the Compañía de Jesús and the Colegio Nacional de Montserrat. Also of note during this period were his landscape engravings such as La Cañada de Córdoba, as well as others such as the Barrancas de Córdoba and the old Suburbio Cordobés.

As a result of his interest in avant-garde art, he later began to experiment with geometrisation and abstract art. Thus, the following period of his work is characterised by a tendency towards abstraction, with simpler and more schematic forms, which would later evolve towards a more surrealist period.

A final period is characterised by the irruption of colour, in sharp contrast with his previous work in monochrome. At this stage, with the use of saturated inks (red, green and ochre), he approaches a neo-figurativism, but more synthetic and schematic.

== Teaching ==
An important part of his life was his vocation as a teacher, in which he was dedicated to training successive generations of students. Some of them would later become renowned Argentine artists, such as Pedro Pont Vergés; Marcelo Bonevardi; Ronaldo de Juan; Alfio Grifasi; César Miranda, Raúl Pecker; José De Monte and Antonio Seguí, among others.

He taught in normal and secondary schools. He began teaching drawing at the Escuelas Pías (1931–1932) and at the Colegio Santo Tomás (1932–1942). Later, he was founder and director of the School of Engraving of the Society of Artists of Córdoba and professor of engraving at the Association of Painters and Sculptors of Córdoba (1939–1940). He founded the first engraving workshop in Córdoba at the Escuela Normal Superior Dr. Agulla (1942–1947). In 1950, he won the Chair of Engraving and later the directorship of the Escuela Superior de Artes (today the Faculty of Arts) of the National University of Córdoba.

== Illustrated books ==
- Niobe, by Jorge M. Furt. [Buenos Aires, Argentina]: [Colombo], 1943. OCLC 461808443
- Adonais. Elegy of Percy Shelley. [Córdoba, Argentina]: [Asociación Argentina de Cultura Británica]. 1944. OCLC 906318543
- Doña Bárbara, by Rómulo Gallegos. [Buenos Aires, Argentina]: [Peuser], 1945. OCLC 892165789
- San Martín, su lucha en verso, by Ana Rosa Tarrio. [Córdoba, Argentina]: [Biffignandi], 1947. OCLC 37609981
- Martín Fierro, by José Hernández. [Buenos Aires, Argentina]: [Peuser], 1951. OCLC 954490284
- El Salto de Ascochinga, Lucio Vicente López. [Buenos Aires, Argentina]: [Argentine Society of Bibliophiles], 1952. OCLC 6450035
- Coral- Ese muro lejano, by Jorge M. Furt. [Buenos Aires, Argentina]: [Colombo], 1952. OCLC 42246612
- Facundo, by Domingo Faustino Sarmiento. [Buenos Aires, Argentina]: [Peuser], 1955. OCLC 310369

== Permanent collections ==
- Museo Nacional de Bellas Artes (Buenos Aires)
- Museum of Fine Arts, La Plata
- Vatican Museums
- Caraffa Fine Arts Museum
- Genaro Pérez Municipal Museum, Córdoba
- Juan B. Castagnino Fine Arts Museum
- Provincial Museum of Fine Arts, Santa Fe
- Guiñazú Museum (Fader House), of Mendoza
- Rosa Galisteo de Rodriguez Provincial Museum, Santa Fe

== Exhibitions ==
- 1937 Los Principios Newspaper, Córdoba
- 1938 Solo Exhibition at Reflex Gallery, Córdoba
- 1939 Rivadavia Library, Mendoza
- 1941 International Exhibition of Engraving, Riverside Museum of New York
- 1942 Argentinean Association of English Culture, Córdoba
- 1942 Provincial Directorate of Tourism, Córdoba
- 1944 Argentinean-North American Cultural Institute, Córdoba
- 1944 Municipal Museum of Rosario, Santa Fe
- 1945 Exhibition of works by Argentinean engravers, Metropolitan Museum of New York, United States
- 1946 General Directorate of Tourism, Córdoba
- 1946 Exhibition of 10 engravings, National Salon of Montevideo, Uruguay
- 1949 Panamerican Union, Washington D.C., USA
- 1949 Exhibition of Argentinean Engravers, National University of Chile, Chile
- 1956 Avellaneda Art Museum, Buenos Aires, Argentina
- 1961 Exhibition of Argentinean Engravings, Japan
- 1963 Casa de la Cultura, Córdoba
- 1964 Feldman Gallery, Córdoba
- 1967 Feldman Gallery, Córdoba
- 1969 Historic Burlington County Prison Museum, New Jersey, United States
- 1970 Vatican Museum
- 1980 Posthumous Exhibition, Feldman Gallery, Córdoba
- 1982 Municipal Museum of Fine Arts, Doctor Genaro Pérez, Córdoba
- 1984 Alberto Nicasio, Homage Exhibition, Agencia Diario Clarin, Córdoba
- 1985 Homage exhibition, Caraffa Museum, Córdoba
- 1988 Alberto Nicasio retrospective exhibition of woodcuts, Gaudí Gallery, Córdoba
- 1989 National Radio Exhibition Hall, Córdoba
- 1989 Exhibition at the Independencia Foundation, Córdoba
- 1994 Churches of Córdoba: woodcuts by Alberto Nicasio, Museum of Religious Art Juan de Tejeda, Córdoba
- 1995 Genaro Pérez Museum, Córdoba
- 1997 Xilographs by Alberto Nicasio, National Museum of Engraving, Buenos Aires

== Awards and distinctions ==
- 1933 Concejo Deliberante Award, I Salón de Otoño, Córdoba
- 1934 Acquisition Award, II Provincial Salon of Fine Arts, Córdoba
- 1935 National Senate Prize, III Autumn Salon, Córdoba
- 1936 Prize in Engraving, IV Salón de Otoño, Córdoba
- 1939 Laura Barberá de Díaz Award. Gold Medal. XXIX National Salon of Fine Arts, Buenos Aires
- 1941 First Prize in Engraving. National Salon of Fine Arts
- 1942 First Prize for Engraving. II Municipal Salon of Fine Arts, Córdoba
- 1942 Founding member of the Society of Plastic Artists of Córdoba
- 1943 Acquisition Prize. Rosario Engraving Salon, Castagnino Museum
- 1945 Salvador Caputto Award. XXII Annual Santa Fe Fine Arts Salon
- 1946 First Prize Alejandro Shaw, XXXI Salon of Watercolourists and Engravers, Buenos Aires
- 1946 Acquisition Prize. II Plastic Arts Salon of the Jockey Club of Córdoba
- 1948 Secretary of Industry, Apprenticeship and Professional Orientation Award, II Salón del Trabajo. Municipal Museum of Fine Arts, Santa Fe
- 1949 First Prize for Engraving. Autumn Exhibition, Córdoba
- 1950 First Prize, IX Mar del Plata Art Salon. Mar del Plata
- 1951 Prize in engraving, I Plastic Arts Salon, Córdoba
- 1951 Prins Grand Prize 1951. National Academy of Fine Arts
- 1951 National University of Córdoba Award. Argentine Salon of Plastic Arts
- 1951 Grand Prize of Honour. National Ministry of Education
- 1952 First Prize in Engraving and Drawing, II Plastic Arts Salon, Córdoba
- 1953 First Prize, Municipal Salon of Plastic Arts, Córdoba
- 1956 Grand Prize of Honour, National Salon of Fine Arts, Buenos Aires
- 1956 Medal Honorable Senate of the Nation. Gold Medal
- 1957 Grand Prize of Honour in Engraving. Mar del Plata Salon
- 1958 Medal, Brussels International Exhibition
- 1958 First Prize at the Santa Fe Salon
- 1960 First Prize. National Salon on Historical Art, Buenos Aires
- 1963 Grand Prize of Honour. Plastic Arts Salon of Córdoba
- 1968 Prize for Intellectual Production. Plastic Arts of Córdoba
- 1970 Second Prize in Engraving, III Annual Salon of APAC, Córdoba
- 1973 Member of the National Academy of Fine Arts

== Bibliography ==
- Nicasio, Alberto; Grimaut, Azor. La Cañada. Estampas de Córdoba = La Cañada. Engravings of Cordoba. [Córdoba, Argentina]: [Litvack], 1944. OCLC 28516759
- Nicasio, Alberto. Monumentos Coloniales de Córdoba = Colonial Monuments of Córdoba, prologued by Carlos Luque Colombres. [Córdoba, Argentina]: [Biffignandi], 1956. OCLC 82094264
- Nicasio, Alberto. Iglesias de Córdoba; estampas xilográficas = Churches of Cordoba; xylographic engravings. [Córdoba, Argentina]: [Oficina del Album del VI Congreso Eucarístico Nacional], 1959. OCLC 18133143
- Nicasio, Alberto. Capillas coloniales de Córdoba: 12 xilografias = Colonial chapels of Córdoba: 12 woodcuts. [Córdoba, Argentina]: [Universidad Nacional de Córdoba], 1961. Twelve woodcuts, and a prologue by Marcelo Montes Pacheco. OCLC 47521772
- Nicasio, Alberto. Grabados de alumnos de la Escuela de Artes, Universidad Nacional de Córdoba = Engravings by students of the School of Arts, National University of Córdoba. [Córdoba, Argentina]: [Pabellón Méjico-Ciudad Universitaria], 1963. OCLC 470181649
- Nicasio, Alberto. 30 Xilografías sobre motivos de La Tierra Purpúrea, de Guillermo Enrique Hudson. [Córdoba, Argentina]: [Litvack].
- Pan American Union. Three engravers of Argentina : Amadeo dell'Acqua, Alberto Nicasio, Victor Rebuffo. [Washingnton D.C., USA]: [The Union], 1949. OCLC 82562298
- Pécora, Óscar and Barranco, Ulises. Sesenta y cinco grabados en madera. La xilografía en el Río de la Plata = Sixty-five wood engravings. Xylography in the River Plate. [Buenos Aires, Argentina]: [Plástica], 1943. OCLC 86095008
- Rizzuto, Manuel Alfredo. Historia y evocación de Alta Gracia = History and evocation of Alta Gracia. [Córdoba, Argentina]: [Asociación Alta Gracia y sus Sierras], 1943. OCLC 81530525
