= Tulumba Department =

Tulumba Department Departamento Tulumba
- Department
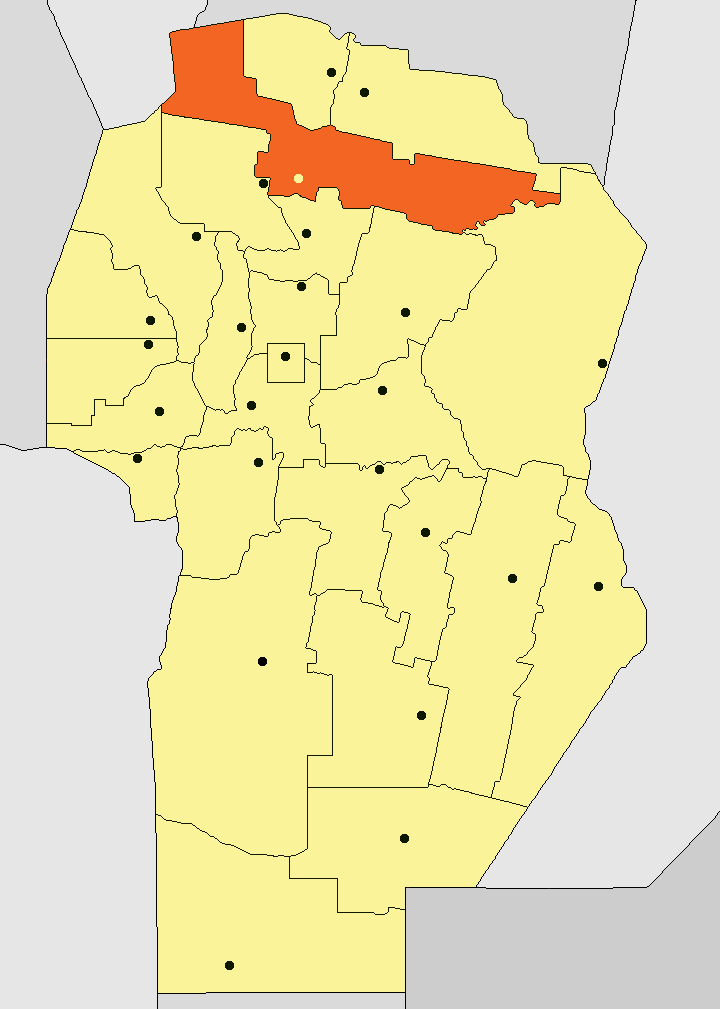
- Location of Tulumba Department in Córdoba Province
- Coordinates: 30°24′S 64°07′W
- Country: Argentina
- Province: Córdoba
- Capital: Villa Tulumba

Area
  - Total: 10,164 km^{2} (3,924 sq mi)

Population (2001 census [INDEC])
  - Total: 12,211
  - Density: 1.2014/km^{2} (3.1116/sq mi)
  - Pop. change (1991-2001): +8.15%
- Time zone: UTC-3 (ART)
- Postal code: X5203
- Dialing code: 03521
- Distances to
- Buenos Aires: ?
- Córdoba: 143 km (89 mi)

Tulumba Department is a department of Córdoba Province in Argentina.

The provincial subdivision has a population of about 12,211 inhabitants in an area of 10,164 km², and its capital city is Villa Tulumba.

== Settlements ==
- Churqui Cañada
- El Rodeo
- Las Arrias
- Lucio V. Mansilla
- Rosario del Saladillo
- San José de La Dormida
- San José de Las Salinas
- San Pedro Norte
- Villa Tulumba
