= Francisco Ernesto Baralle =

Argentinian geneticist

Francisco Ernesto (Tito) Baralle
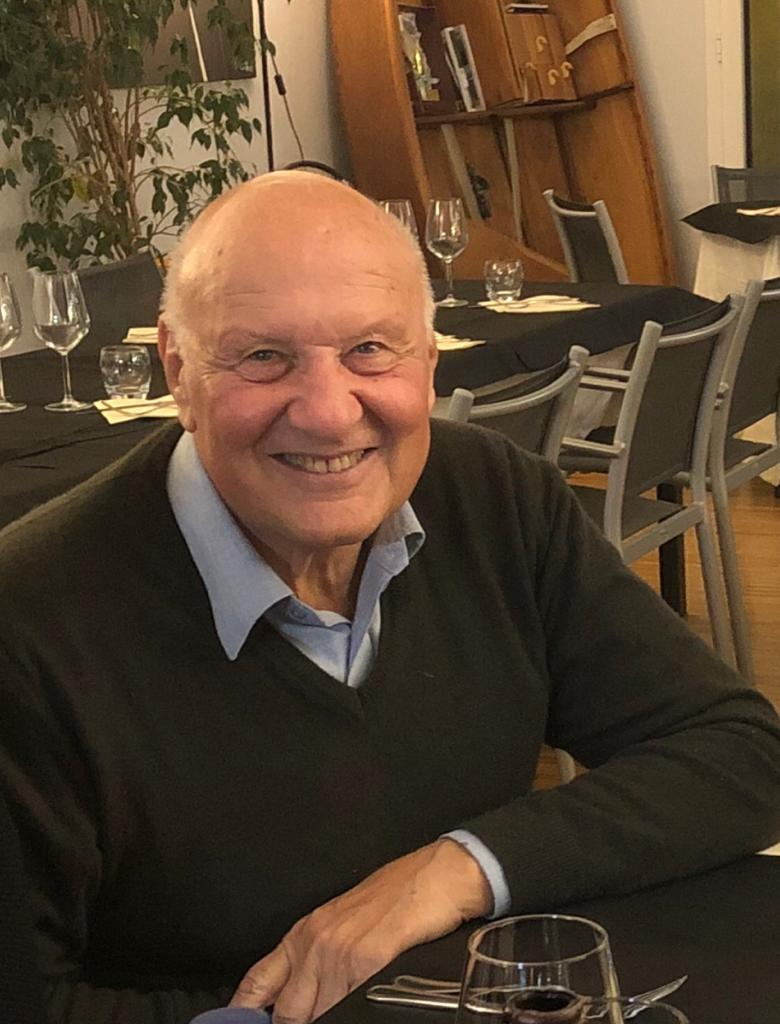
- Born: 26 October 1943; Buenos Aires, Argentina
- Children: 4
- Scientific career
- Workplaces: University of Oxford; ICGEB

Francisco Ernesto (Tito) Baralle (born 26 October 1943, in Buenos Aires) is an Argentinian geneticist best known for his innovations in molecular biology and in particular the discovery of how genes are processed and mechanisms in mRNA splicing.

== Biography ==
Francisco Ernesto (a.k.a. Tito) Baralle was born in Buenos Aires, Argentina on 26 October 1943. After completing his Ph.D. studies at the Department of Organic Chemistry, he transferred to the Instituto de Investigaciones Bioquimicas Fundacion Campomar directed by Prof. Luis F. Leloir, now the Leloir Institute. In 1974, he moved to the MRC Laboratory of Molecular Biology, Cambridge University, UK, where he worked in the Division directed by Dr. Frederick Sanger. From (1980 to 1990), he was University Lecturer of Pathology at Oxford University and Fellow of Magdalen College. In 1993, he was awarded the Platinum Konex Award for Science and Technology (Argentina) as the best scientist of the decade in Genetics and Cytology.

In September 1990, he was appointed Director of the Trieste Component of International Centre for Genetic Engineering and Biotechnology (ICGEB) an autonomous, intergovernmental organisation originally established under UNIDO. From 2004-2014 he was the Director-General of the institute, overseeing laboratories in 4 continents, spanning 63 countries championing collaboration, scientific education and dissemination of Science and Biotechnology worldwide.

During his 10 year tenure as Director-General, and as well as expanding his medical and scientific research, he was responsible for the establishment of a Biotechnology Development Group serving as a training hub for researchers of developing countries, transferring biopharmaceutical know-how locally.

He was a strong supporter of the internationalization of science and took the 2-component (Italy and India) International Centre for Genetic Engineering and Biotechnology, and expanded it to 4 component institutions, establishing, and opening new centres in Africa and Argentina, giving opportunities and access to young scientists from the developing world.

== Scientific activity ==
In 1977, and as a staff scientist at the laboratory of molecular biology, Cambridge, Tito published the sequence of the messenger RNA coding for beta-globin, the first complete primary structure of a eukaryotic mRNA. In 1979, his research group isolated the gene for epsilon-globin (HBE1), a component of human embryonic hemoglobin. He was one of the first to describe the pre-mRNA alternative splicing process in the 1980s.

His studies on how genes are processed described the first sequences within exons that control splicing, exonic splicing enhancer (ESE) and has since made critical contributions to understanding the molecular mechanisms involved in this important cellular process in health and disease. He first identified the protein called TDP 43, that is now known to play a central role in certain neurodegenerative disorders (Frontotemporal lobar degeneration, Amyotrophic lateral sclerosis and Alzheimer disease). Tito Baralle is a leader and innovator in molecular biology and in particular the discovery of how genes are processed and mechanisms in mRNA splicing.

== Honors and awards ==
- 2014 Doctor Honoris Causae of the Faculty of Medicine Universidad de la Republica, Montevideo, Uruguay
- 2010 University of Nova Gorica, Slovenia Golden Plate Award for his work on international scientific collaboration. Full Professor of Molecular Biology
- 2010 Premio Raices, granted very selectively by the Minister of Science and Technology of Argentina for promotion of scientific education in Argentina
- 2010 Fellow of the Academy of Sciences for the Developing World-TWAS for the advancement of science in the developing world
- 2001 Fellow National Academy of Sciences of Argentina
- 1999 Visiting Professor University of Trieste
- 1993 Premio Konex de Platino, Konex Foundation Platinum prize in Science and technology, awarded to best scientist of the decade in Genetic and Cytology.
- 1993 Konex Foundation Merit Diploma in Science and Technology
- 1993 Honorary Professor of Biochemistry at the Faculty of Sciences, University of Buenos Aires
- 1980 Member of the European Molecular Biology Organization (EMBO)

== Scientific publications ==
Tito has over 200 scientific publications, some of his most cited are:

- "The Structure and evolution of the human b-globin gene family"
- “TDP-43 Mutations in Familial and Sporadic Amyotrophic Lateral Sclerosis”
- "Primary structure of human fibronectin: Differential splicing may generate at least 10 polypeptides from a single gene"
- “Genomic variants in exons and introns: identifying the splicing spoilers”
- “Characterisation and functional implications of the RNA binding properties of nuclear factor TDP-43, a novel splicing regulator of CFTR Exon 9”
