= Nicasio School District =

School district in California, United States

Address
- 5555 Nicasio Valley Road Nicasio, California, 94946; United States

District information
- Type: Public
- Grades: K–8
- NCES District ID: 0627300

Students and staff
- Students: 34 (2020–2021)
- Teachers: 3.0 (FTE)
- Staff: 2.66 (FTE)
- Student–teacher ratio: 11.33:1

Other information
- Website: www.nicasioschool.org

Nicasio Elementary School District is a public school district in Marin County, California, United States. The school was founded in 1862.

== Gallery ==
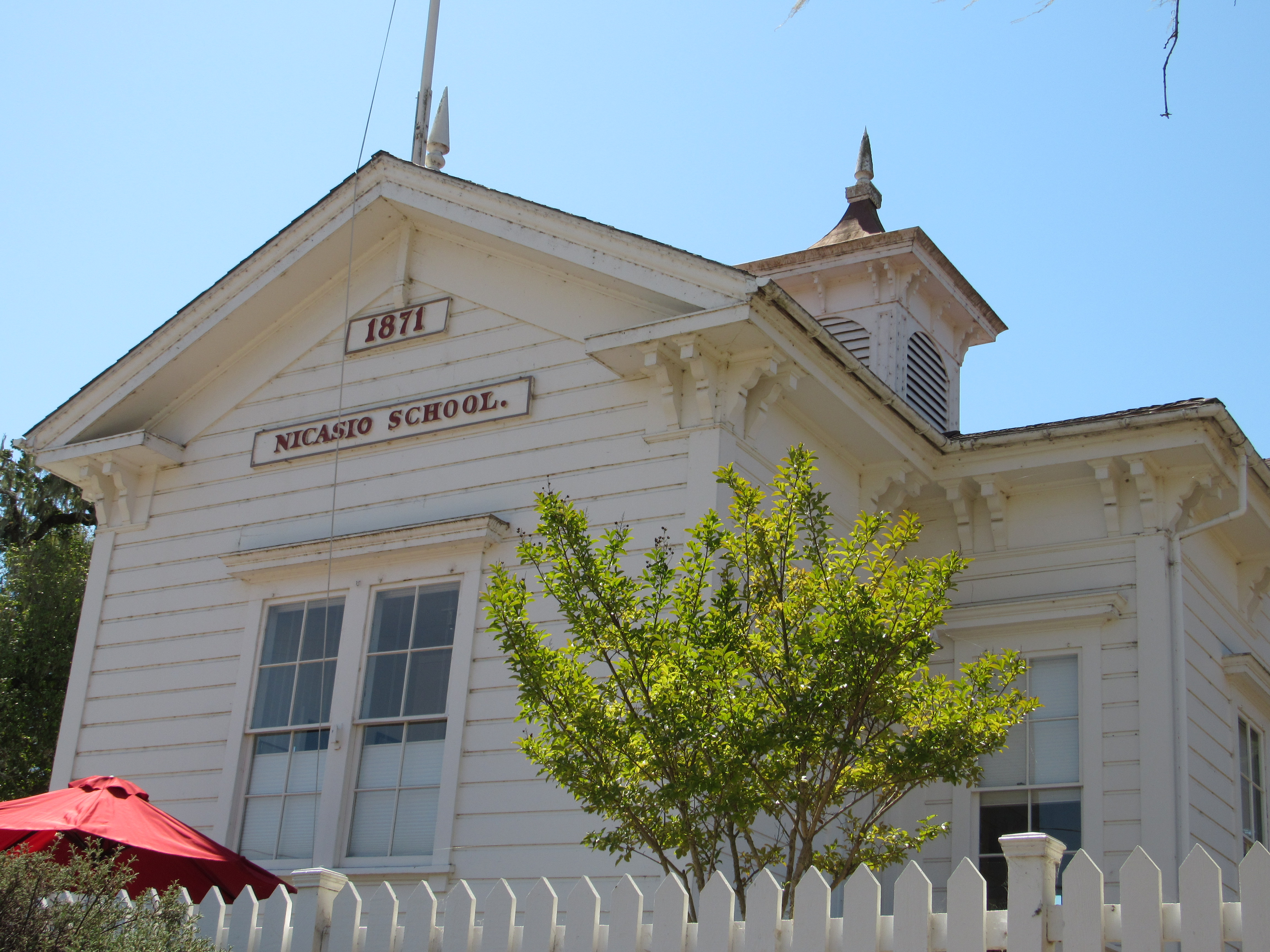
1871 Nicasio Schoolhouse

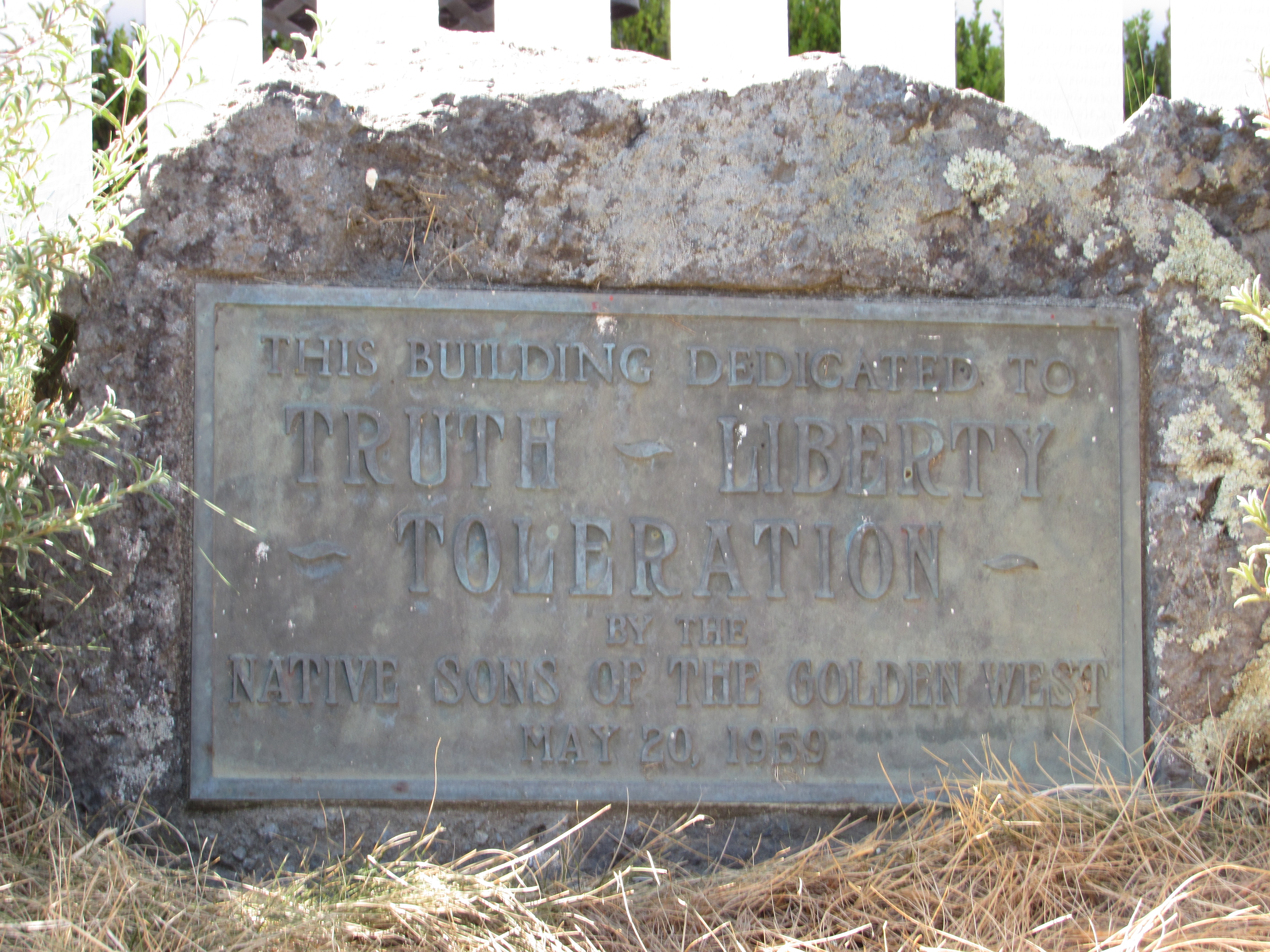
Plaque in front of Nicasio Schoolhouse

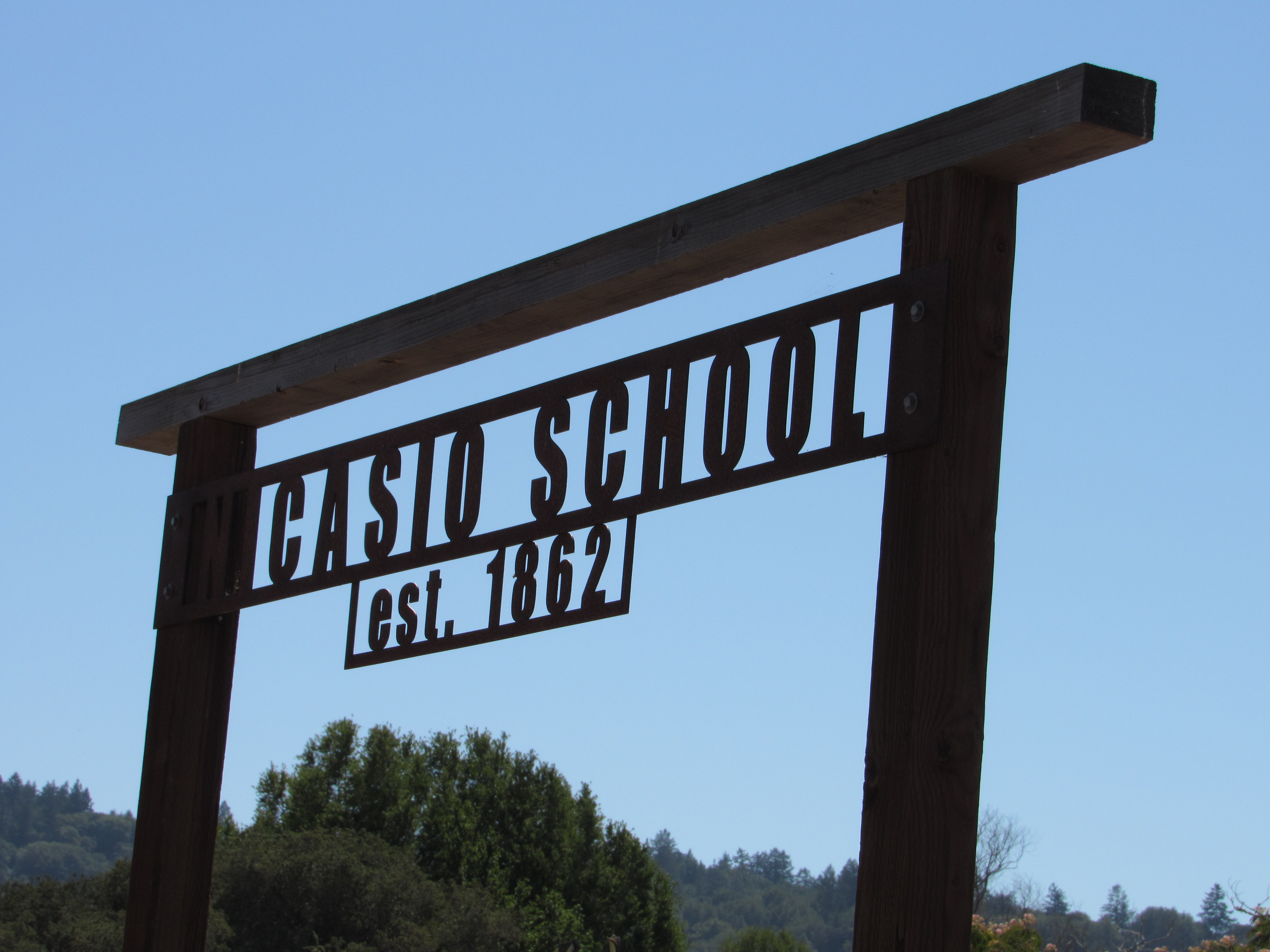
Nicasio School sign

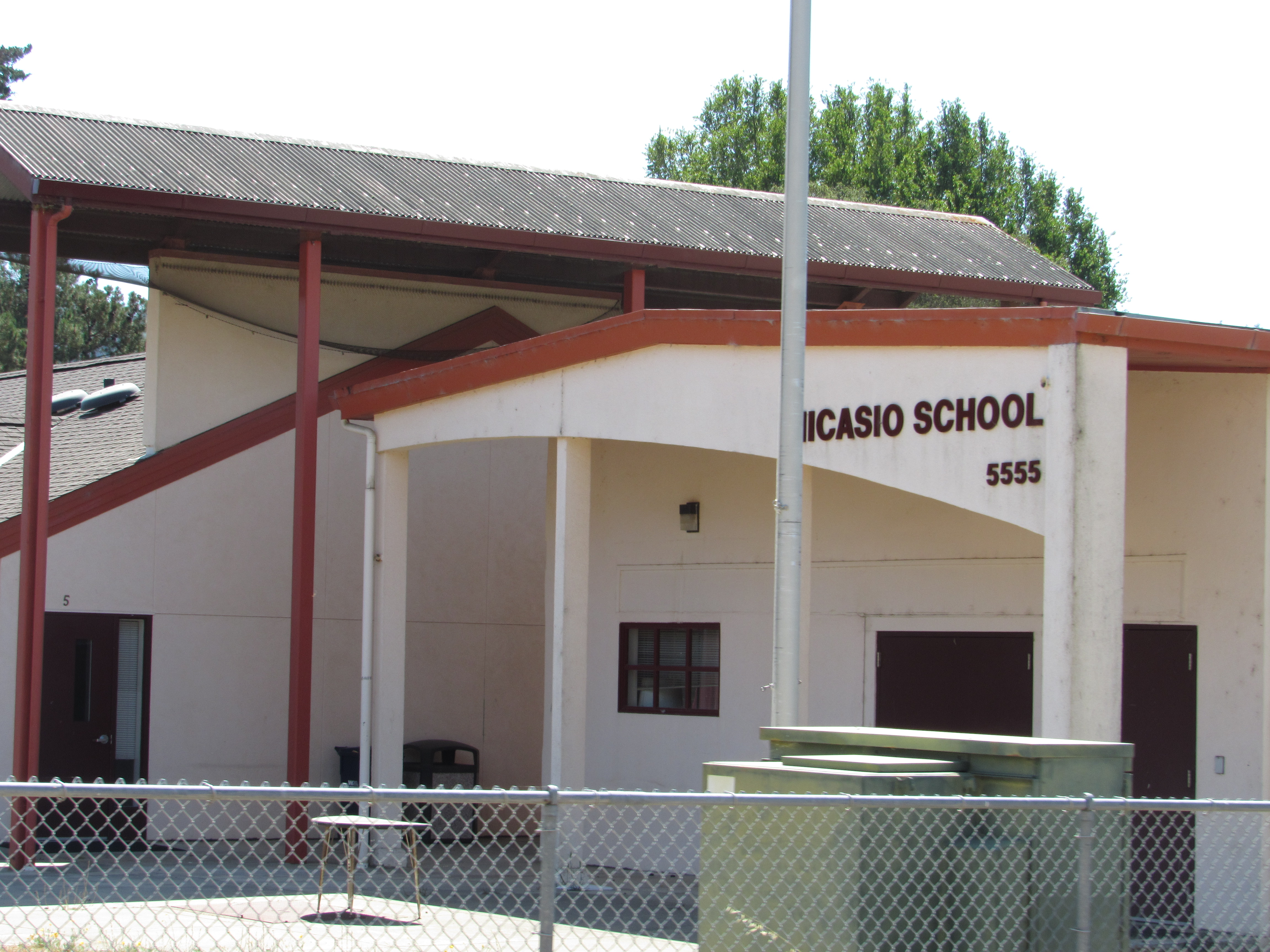
Nicasio School building
