= Marcelo Bonevardi =

American painter

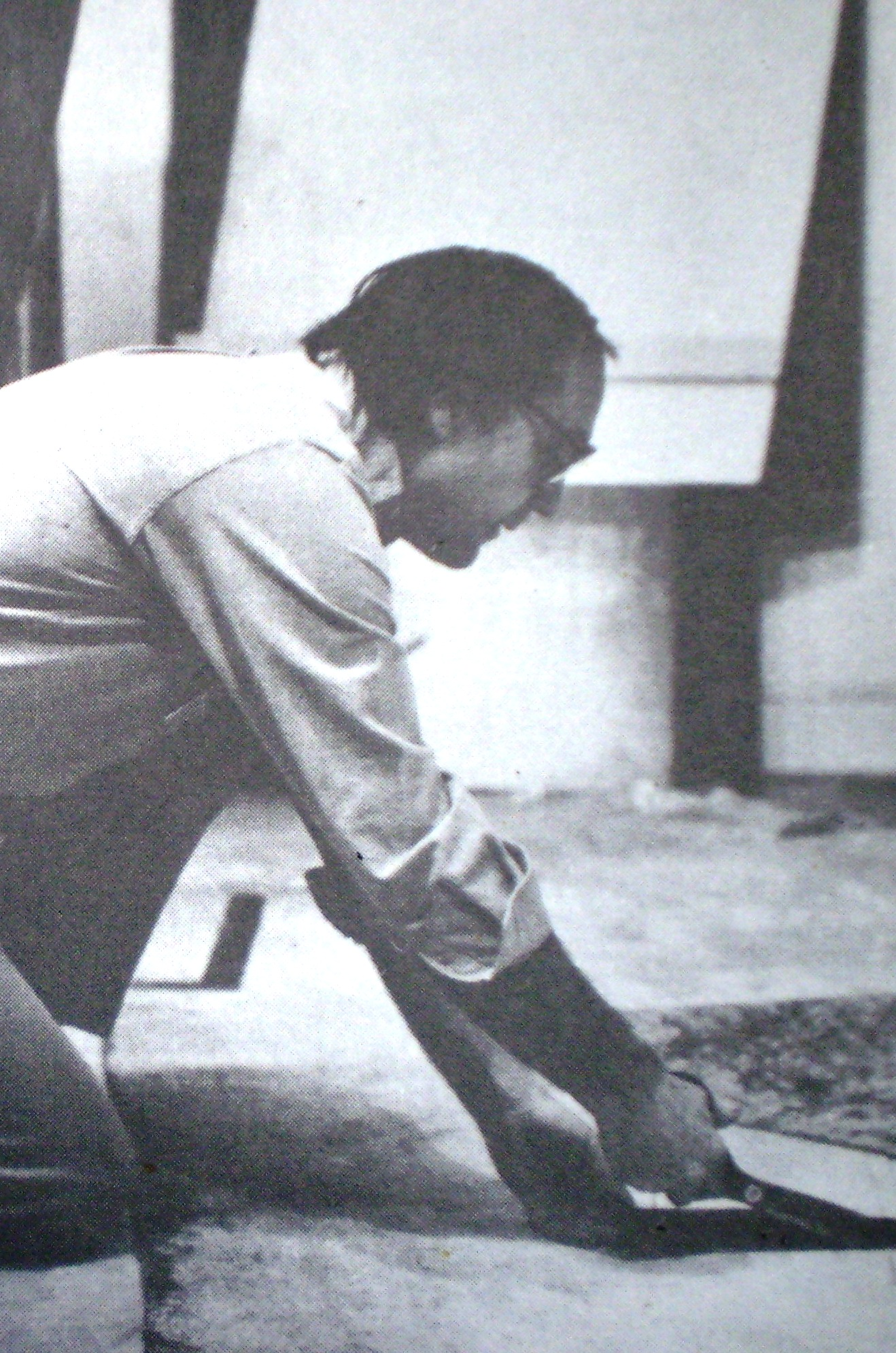
- Marcelo Bonevardi, in his studio, 1980
- Born: 1929
- Died: 1994 (aged 64–65)
- Occupation: avant-garde artist
- Known for: his mixed media pieces

Marcelo Bonevardi (1929–1994) was a Latin American avant-garde artist known for his mixed media pieces. A native of Argentina, Bonevardi spent the greater part of his career in New York City, where he absorbed avant-garde practices and influences such as abstraction and primitivism, using them to invent a pictorial and symbolic language with which to express his deep spirituality and affinity for myth and ritual. Bonevardi is best known for his shaped canvases, often employing mixed media, which combine elements of painting and sculpture, reflecting his early training and lifelong interest in architecture. During his lifetime, Bonevardi received many honors, including the International Prize at the X Bienal de São Paulo, first prize in the "Ten Argentine Artists at the United Nations" permanent installation, and the Platinum Prize from the Konex Foundation.

Bonevardi's work has been collected by many leading North American and Latin American museums, including the Museum of Modern Art and the Guggenheim Museum in New York City; the Museo Nacional de Bellas Artes and the Museo de Arte Moderno in Buenos Aires; the Museu de Arte Contemporânea da Universidade in São Paulo; and the Museo Rufino Tamayo in Mexico City.

== See also ==
- Mixed media
- Shaped canvas
