= Villa Tulumba =

- Town
- Location of Villa Tulumba in Argentina
- Coordinates: 30°24′S 64°07′W
- Country: Argentina
- Province: Córdoba
- Department: Tulumba

Government
  - Intendant: Roberto Raúl Casas (JxC)
- Elevation: 668 m (2,192 ft)

Population
  - Total: 1,161
- Demonym: tulumbana/o
- Time zone: UTC−3 (ART)
- CPA base: X5203
- Dialing code: +54 3521

Villa Tulumba is a town in Córdoba Province, Argentina. It is the head town of the Tulumba Department.
