= Battle of Angaco =

- Part of Argentine Civil Wars
Date	16 August 1841
Location	Angaco Department, San Juan Province, Argentina
Result	Unitarian victory

Belligerents
Federal Army of the West	Unitarians

Commanders and leaders
José Félix Aldao	Mariano Acha

Strength
Total: 1,947–2,297 (c. 2,200 men): 700 infantry; 1,127–1,477 cavalry; 120 artillery; 4 cannons	Total: 629 (c. 500–600 men): 250 infantry; 340 cavalry; 39 artillery; 2 cannons

Casualties and losses
Over 1,000 dead, 157 prisoners	170 dead, 144 wounded

The Battle of Angaco (16 August 1841), was a battle in the Argentine Civil Wars between Unitarian and Federalist forces at Angaco, about 23 kilometres (14 mi) NNE of San Juan, Argentina, that gave an ephemeral advantage to the Unitarians. The federal leader was General José Félix Aldao and the Unitarians were led by Mariano Acha. This was the bloodiest of all battles of the Argentine civil wars. The Unitarians won a transitory victory, because soon after Federalists retook the city of San Juan and defeated, captured and killed Acha.

== Setting the scene ==
In May 1840 La Rioja Province separated from the Confederation of Argentina and joined the Northern Coalition. This made the Cuyo provinces launch a campaign against La Rioja. In 1841 the dictator Juan Manuel de Rosas had managed to end the support that the French were supplying to the Unitarians, repulsed Juan Lavalle in Buenos Aires Province and resolved the situation in Montevideo. Rosas now began to take a grip in the contest.

Federal troops took La Rioja Province, but did not destroy the Unitarian army. In Sañogasta the Governor of San Juan, Nazario Benavídez, beat La Rioja governor Tomás Brizuela and forced him to take flight. Brizuela, wounded in the back, was taken prisoner and died shortly after. The Unitarian General Gregorio Aráoz de Lamadrid marched on the city of La Rioja, which was unprotected, and took it. Meanwhile, Ángel Vicente Peñaloza (Chacho Peñaloza) reassembled his army in the plains, threatening San Juan, and harassing the border towns between the two provinces. Benavidez, leading troops from San Juan, and Aldao, with troops from Mendoza and San Luis, planned to meet and take the city of La Rioja.

In August, Unitarian General Mariano Acha marched from La Rioja to San Juan with a vanguard unit of the army, aiming to avoid meeting Benavidez and Aldao but to distract the Federal Army of the West from its invasion of La Rioja, to give time for Lamadrid to get the bulk of his army into shape and to receive reinforcements. Along the way 380 of Acha's 900 men deserted. Acha took the city of San Juan on August 13 without any combat, and in two days was reprovisioned.

== Meeting of the vanguards ==
Before the fall of San Juan, Benavídez was supplied with 300 horses and 400 men. He returned towards the city at top speed. His force spent the night in a place called the paddocks of Daniel Marcó, in the Albardón Department, bordering Angaco. General Acha, knowing that Benavídez had returned with his column, left the city and went north to meet it with a small group of Unitarian reinforcements from San Juan.

On the morning of 15 August 1841 the Unitarian vanguard, the Brizuela Battalion led by Juan Crisóstomo Álvarez, spotted the federal camp, which was at the ranch with horses unsaddled. It was a surprise for both armies, who did not expect to meet so soon or at that place. Alvarez immediately gave the order to attack. The battle lasted two hours. Benavídez's troops, who were tired, hungry and short of sleep, were defeated. Although it was a triumph, the Unitarians only managed to disperse their enemies, not to defeat them. Shortly after the end of the battle they saw the thick dust of the Federal Army of the West, with its commander José Félix Aldao, who entered the ravine between the Pie de Palo and Sierra de Villicum.

== Development of the battle ==
=== Order of battle ===
Arm	Unitarians (Vanguard)	Federal Army of the West
Commander in chief	Mariano Acha	José Félix Aldao
Assistants	Chief of staff commander Igarzábal, Atanasio Marques, Server Pizarro	Nazario Benavídez
Infantry	Freedom battalion, Colonel Lorenzo Álvarez, 250 men	Cazadores battalion (San Juan), Colonel José Manuel Espinosa, 350 men and Auxiliary Battalion of Mendoza, Major N. Barrera, 350 men
Cavalry	Brizuela legion, Colonel Crisóstomo Álvarez, 200 men, and Paz squadron, Colonel Francisco Álvarez, 140 men	2nd Auxiliary Regiment of the Andes, Colonel Juan Antonio Benavídez, 477 men; Militia Regiment of San Juan, Colonel José M. Oyuela, 350 men
Artillery	2 pieces, 39 men	4 pieces, 120 men
Total	629 men	1.947 men

=== Unitarian plan ===
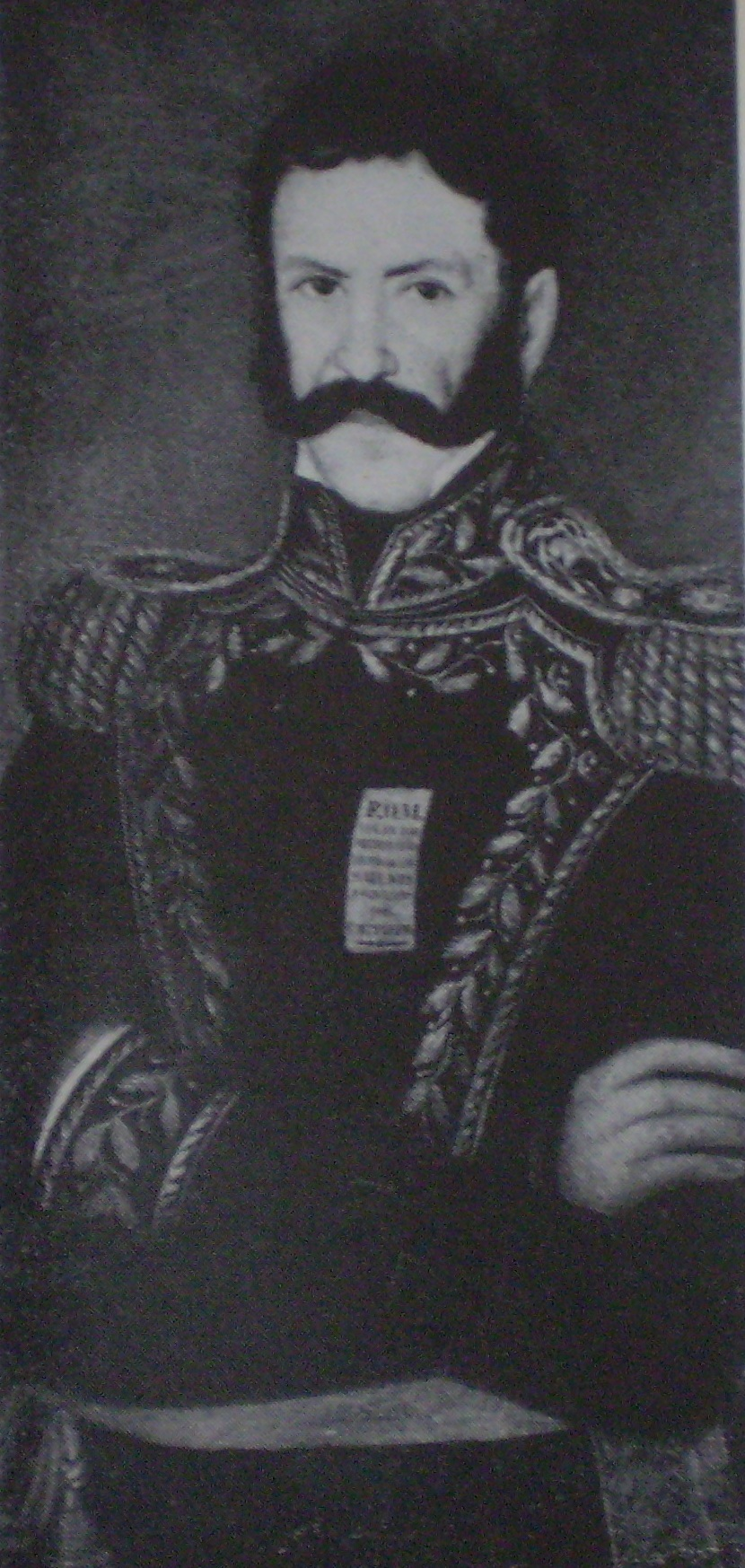
José Félix Aldao

Aldao continued to advance, safe in the numerical superiority of his forces, and met with Benavídez, who had reassembled his troops. Acha, made confident by the partial success that his vanguard had achieved, had time to choose the most advantageous spot to wait for the enemy. Acha selected a place where there was a large ditch more than 5 metres (16 ft) wide and 2.5 metres (8 ft 2 in) deep, with bushy rows of Carolinian poplars on both banks. He formed up his army behind the ditch, with the infantry and artillery in the center and the cavalry on either side.

The battle site was known as "North End" because it marked the end of the valley and the beginning of the desert. Today it is crossed by Ontiveros and El Bosque streets near the boundary between the municipalities of Angaco and Albardón. There is a memorial monolith placed on the site in 1993, on the anniversary of the battle.

== The battle ==
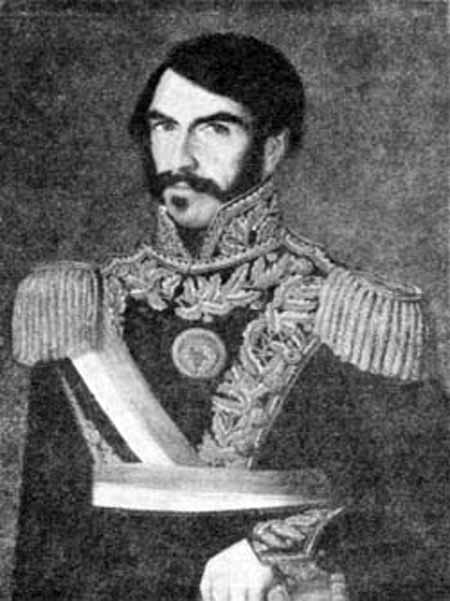
Nazario Benavídez

Benavidez and Aldao argued about who should command the Army of the West. Finally they agreed that Benavídez would command the vanguard and Aldao the main army. On 16 August 1841, at 8:00 on a cold day, Benavídez advanced with his cavalry in a fierce attack before main Federalist army had reached the battlefield, and dashed against his enemies. After two hours of fighting, in which half of his men were killed, he had to retire. Aldao, aware of the situation, did nothing to help. One of the first to fall, with a bullet in the head, was Colonel José Manuel Espinoza, head of the Cazadores battalion of San Juan. He was replaced in the field by Colonel Francisco Domingo Díaz, who would twice become governor of San Juan.

Aldao ordered the infantry to charge the center of the Unitarian line, with cavalry flanking both sides. Acha's artillery, superior to the federal, destroyed the infantry. The bodies filled the ditch from side to side. The federal cavalry attacked the Unitarian line, but a quick movement of the two squadrons of Unitarian cavalry repulsed the attack and forced it back.

Aldao then ordered his cavalry to attack the flanks, where the Unitarian guns caused great destruction and forced it to retire for the second time. During the confusion of the cavalry attack, Aldao wanted to exploit the situation and ordered Francisco Díaz to advance at the trot towards the line of enemy artillery and infantry. The Unitarian guns fired point blank at Díaz's troops, who closed in hand-to-hand combat with bayonets and sabers. Meanwhile, Acha moved up and down the infantry line, giving them support wherever they were weak. The Federal cavalry was defeated by the Unitarian cavalry and as a result the infantry had to retreat with heavy losses.

The battle was stopped around two in the afternoon, after six hours of fighting. While waiting for a new federal onslaught, Acha ordered his infantry to take position within the ditch, using it as a trench. Aldao, furious at being unable to win despite great numerical superiority, quickly reformed the two infantry battalions and ordered a new attack, without giving time for the cavalry, which was dispersed, to rearm. The infantry locked in bloody combat with heavy casualties.

When the Federal cavalry managed to join the battle it was defeated once again by the Unitarians, with Crisóstomo Álvarez at its head. Despite being wounded, he led his troops and pursued the federal cavalry, which retreated for the third time. Aldao ordered a new maneuver, with commander Rodríguez to attack with cavalry from the rear, but the Unitarians had been warned and shot at close range. Rodríguez was among those killed.

Acha moved along his line, haranguing his troops to raise their courage. He told them the enemy would kill any prisoners, so they should die fighting if need be. Aldao, overcome by despair, personally led the remnants of his infantry and advanced to the ditch, where his men threw themselves flat on the ground, firing intensely at a range of 5 metres (16 ft). The federal cavalry returned to the attack, and again the cavalry of Crisóstomo Álvarez repelled their attacks and put them to flight. Giving chase, when the Unitarian cavalry reached the road it turned sharply and charged the Federalist infantry. Major N. Barrera, in front of the Federal Infantry, gave battle until only 44 of his men survived, who laid down their arms.

With the infantry lost, the rest of the Federal army fled to the interior of San Juan Province. It was about 17:00. Meanwhile, Benavídez went to the city of San Juan, where he gathered 400 men, pretending to have triumphed. When Acha advanced towards the city, Benavídez fled to La Rinconada. The Federal army lost over a thousand men, most of their baggage, and lost 157 infantry as prisoners. The Unitarians lost more than 170 men. Both sides left many of their officers in the battlefield.

== Aftermath ==
The Unitarian victory was short-lived. A few days later at the Battle of La Chacarilla, Nazario Benavidez defeated the Unitarian fighters who had survived Angaco, recovered the city of San Juan and captured General Acha, who would be executed shortly afterwards. General Lamadrid continued his slow advance towards the cities of San Juan and then Mendoza, which he held in turn. Persecuted first by Benavidez and then by General Angel Pacheco, he was finally defeated in the Battle of Rodeo del Medio, which ended Unitarian resistance for a decade.

Relations between Aldao and Benavidez were soured by the defeat. This was aggravated because Benavidez was named Chief of the Federal Army of the West soon after, and won military prestige despite the defeat.
