= Manuel José Gómez Rufino =

Argentine politician

JManuel José Gómez Rufino
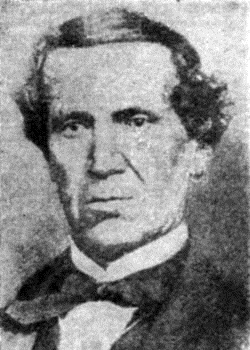

Governor of San Juan Province, Argentina
- In office 8 September 1857 – 28 December 1858
- Preceded by: Nicanor Molinas

Governor of San Juan Province, Argentina
- In office 18 May 1873 – 5 November 1874
- Preceded by: Uladislao Frías
- Succeeded by: Sandalio Echeverría

Personal details
- Born: c. 1820 San Juan, Argentina
- Died: 1882 San Juan, Argentina
- Party: Unitarian Party

Manuel José Gómez Rufino (c. 1820–1882) was an Argentine politician who was governor of San Juan Province, Argentina between 1857 and 1858 and again between 1873 and 1874.

== The province of San Juan ==
Manuel José Gómez Rufino was born in the city of San Juan, Argentina around 1820. In his youth he was a merchant and was not involved in politics, apart from a certain sympathy for the pharmacist Amán Rawson and his friends in the Unitarian Party.

After the Battle of Caseros (3 February 1852), in which the dictator Juan Manuel de Rosas was defeated by Justo José de Urquiza, Gómez became a prominent member of the Unitarian Party. He participated in the revolution against the caudillo Governor Nazario Benavídez in May 1852, which brought to power the Colonel Zacarías Yanzi. Three months later, Benavídez returned to government with the support of President Justo José de Urquiza. Benavídez was succeeded by Francisco Díaz. Although Díaz was not a Unitarian, he was progressively inclined to favor that party.

In March 1857, a revolution led by Benavídez overthrew Diaz. President Urquiza sent Nicanor Molinas as a federal inspector, an old associate of the President. Molinas came into conflict with Benavídez, who was used to ruling as he felt fit, and was accustomed to being obeyed. Molinas favored his opponents. The Unitarians, supported financially by their friends in Buenos Aires, won the elections, enacted a provincial constitution, and on 8 September 1857 appointed Gómez Rufino as Governor.

== First governorship ==
Gómez appointed Saturnino María Laspiur as his government Minister. He set about organizing public institutions - many of which were not enacted as he had designed - and modified and modernized the tax and accounting system of the province. He supported Liberal journalism. Gómez, Laspiur and Antonino Aberastain organized the formation of a liberal party. For defense against troops loyal to Benavídez, Gómez created a National Guard, or urban militia, led by liberal officers.

Benavídez refused to cede control of the provincial armed forces, on the grounds that he was the commander of the Army of the West of the Confederation of Argentina. Some of Benavidez's friends wanted to organize a revolution, but it seems that the general did not participate in those plans. Nevertheless, Gómez ordered Benavídez's arrest. There then began circulating rumors that he would be killed. From Buenos Aires, the liberal press demanded revenge. The most bitter of Benavídez's enemies was Domingo Faustino Sarmiento, who openly urged Benavidez's death in the Buenos Aires press.

Urquiza decided to rescue Benavídez and ordered Federalist intervention, at first only to secure his release. Before the commission could arrive, during an attempt by a group of his supporters to free him, his jailers murdered Benavídez. The murder was celebrated in Buenos Aires, and Gómez refused to hand over the murderers to justice. In response, the commissioners Santiago Derqui, José Miguel Galán and Baldomero García deposed Gómez.

== Turmoil in San Juan ==
Gómez was arrested, imprisoned and ended in the same cell and in the same condition that Benavidez had been killed. After a thorough investigation, was taken as prisoner to Paraná, and was released in May without being formally accused of the crime. But the crime contributed to the outbreak of war between the Confederation and the State of Buenos Aires. The war culminated in the Battle of Cepeda (23 October 1859), and was terminated with the Pact of San José de Flores and the reform of the 1853 Constitution.

Gomez returned to San Juan in late 1860 and took part in the revolution that ended the life and government of Governor José Antonio Virasoro. He supported the Unitarian government of Aberastain, but this did not survive the subsequent federal intervention. Apparently, he moved to Buenos Aires for a while. In 1862 Gómez was elected senator for San Juan, and from that position supported the policies of President Bartolomé Mitre. For a short time he was vice president of the National Public Credit, which mainly handled finance for the Paraguayan War. In subsequent years he remained in Buenos Aires.

In December 1872 a relative of Gómez, Lieutenant Colonel Agustín Gómez, launched a revolution after being defeated in the gubernatorial election. He did not succeed, but the province was plunged into disarray. The federal government sent an intervention led by the Minister Uladislao Frías, who openly launched a new candidate: Manuel José Gómez Rufino. With presidential support, he was elected governor on the National Autonomist Party platform and took office on 18 May 1873.

== Second governorship and revolution of 1874 ==
Gómez's second term was orderly and achieved some institutional progress. But a simmering rivalry with President Sarmiento, who sought to control the Autonomist Party from the capital, caused loss of national support and funding for his initiatives. For a short time he supported the candidacy of Mitre in the 1874 elections, but ended up publicly supporting Nicolás Avellaneda, the candidate who ended up being the winner. Shortly after the election, Mitre and José Miguel Arredondo launched a revolution. Arredondo controlled the cities of Córdoba and San Luis. From there he attacked Mendoza, and demanded that Gómez join him. Since he refused, after his victory in the First battle of Santa Rosa, Arredondo invaded San Juan and deposed the governor, who fled to Chile. In his place the governor installed Sandalio Echevarría.

But a few weeks later, Arredondo was defeated in the Second battle of Santa Rosa, and Echevarría was forced to flee to Chile. But Gómez decided not to return. He established himself in Chile, while his party organized the San Juan Autonomists without further intervention from Buenos Aires. His relative Agustin Gómez finally got the provincial government by especially violent means in 1878. Gómez Rufino returned to San Juan, but never returned to active politics. He died in San Juan in July 1882.
