= Mi defensa =

1843 autobiography by Domingo Faustino Sarmiento

Mi defensa is an autobiography written in 1843 in pamphlet form by Domingo Faustino Sarmiento, a writer and journalist who became the seventh president of Argentina.

== Theme ==
This was Sarmiento's first autobiography and it was written in pamphlet form. It omits any substantial information or recognition of his illegitimate daughter Ana. This would have discredited Sarmiento as a respected father of Argentina, as Sarmiento portrays himself as a sole individual, disregarding or denouncing important ties to other people and groups in his life.
