= Inmigración y colonización =

Former Argentina president's own creation

Inmigración y colonización is a work written by Domingo Faustino Sarmiento, a writer and journalist who became the seventh president of Argentina.

== Theme ==
The publication of Inmigración y colonización led to mass immigration of Europeans to mostly urban Argentina, which Sarmiento believed would assist in 'civilizing' the country over the more barbaric gauchos and rural provinces. This had a large impact on Argentine politics, especially as much of the civil tension in the country was divided between the rural provinces and the cities. In addition to increased urban population, these European immigrants had a cultural effect upon Argentina, providing what Sarmiento believed to be more civilized culture similar to North America's.

== Bibliography ==
- Crowley, Francis G. (1972), Domingo Faustino Sarmiento, New York: Twayne
