= Nicanor Molinas =

Argentine lawyer, politician and prominent official

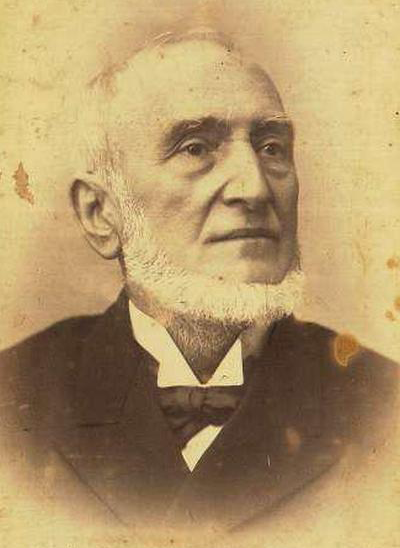
- Born: August 1823; Corrientes, Argentina
- Died: July 1892; Buenos Aires, Argentina
- Occupation: Lawyer

Nicanor Molinas (August 1823 – July 1892) was an Argentine lawyer, politician, and prominent official during the last years of the Argentine Confederation.

== Early years ==
Nicanor Molinas was born in Corrientes, Argentina in August 1823, the son of a Spanish immigrant. He studied at the Jesuit college of Buenos Aires, becoming a lawyer in 1845 and a doctor in 1847. Shortly after he went to Barcelona to visit his father's family, but the ship he was traveling in sank off Santa Catarina Island, in Brazil. He settled in Montevideo, and enlisted as a cadet in the army of the city. Molinas moved to Entre Ríos Province, where he dedicated himself to medicine and was appointed a judge of the criminal court and a civil court adviser. Molinas represented Corrientes and Entre Ríos Provinces to the government of Paraguay in 1850, to resolve conflicts caused by years of military expeditions from that country against Corrientes and Misiones Province.

== Urquiza official ==
In 1851 Molinas represented governor Justo José de Urquiza to the Corrientes government, to coordinate legal and public steps that both governments would make before and after Urquiza's "statement" against the dictator Juan Manuel de Rosas. Molinas also represented Urquiza to the government of Domingo Crespo, who succeeded Rosa's supporter Pascual Echagüe as governor of Santa Fe Province shortly before the Battle of Caseros.

After Caseros he was Uquiza's representative to the new governor of Corrientes, Juan Gregorio Pujol. Under President Urquiza he took many different public offices, especially in the area of public finances. He was also appointed Minister of the Supreme Court of the Confederacy, but never worked as such. On 18 March 1857 governor Francisco Domingo Díaz of San Juan Province was overthrown in a revolution. The former governor Nazario Benavídez assumed the position of interim Governor. Nicanor Molinas was appointed head of a commission that arrived in April 1857, and Molinas took over as acting governor while arranging elections. On 6 September 1857 Manuel José Gómez Rufino was elected governor.

Under the government of Molinas's friend Santiago Derqui he was foreign minister. During the federal intervention in Córdoba Province he was temporary Minister of Interior. After the Battle of Pavón (17 September 1861) he remained loyal to Urquiza, and was a member of the Entre Ríos provincial legislature. He was also general minister of Entre Ríos under the governments of Urquiza and José María Domínguez.

== Last years ==
On the death of Urquiza in 1870, Molinas went to Santa Fe. He was accused of being a supporter of the caudillo Ricardo López Jordán, for which he was arrested. He settled in Santa Fe, and devoted himself to the practice of medicine, leaving politics forever. Molinas died in Buenos Aires in July 1892.
