= Informes sobre educación =

Informes sobre educación is a report written in 1856 by Domingo Faustino Sarmiento, a writer and journalist who became the seventh president of Argentina.

== Theme ==
This report was the first official statistic report on education in Latin America. It includes information on gender and location distribution of pupils, salaries and wages, and comparative achievement. The work proposes new theories, plans, and methods of education as well as quality controls on schools and learning systems.
