= Recuerdos de Provincia =

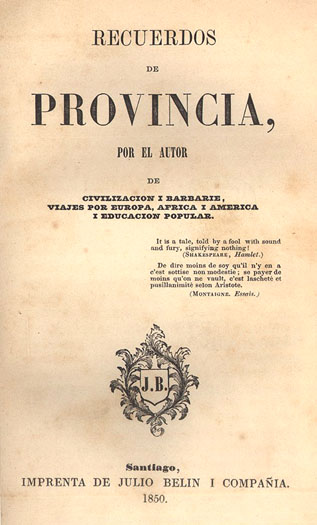
Title page from 1850 edition of "Recuerdos de provincia"

Recuerdos de Provincia (also known in English as: Recollections of a Provincial Past) is an autobiography written in 1850 by Domingo Faustino Sarmiento, a writer and journalist who became the seventh president of Argentina.

== Theme ==
In this second autobiography, Sarmiento displays a stronger effort to include familial links and ties to his past, in contrast to Mi defensa, choosing to relate himself to San Juan and his Argentine heritage. Sarmiento discusses growing up in rural Argentina with basic ideologies and simple livings. Recuerdos discusses his Similar to Facundo, Sarmiento uses previous dossiers filed against himself by enemies to assist in writing Recuerdos and therefore fabricating an autobiography based on these files and from his own memory. Sarmiento's persuasion in this book is substantial. The accounts, whether all true or false against him, are a source of information to write Recuerdos as he is then able to object and rectify into what he creates as a 'true account' of autobiography.
