= Villa del Salvador =

- City and municipality
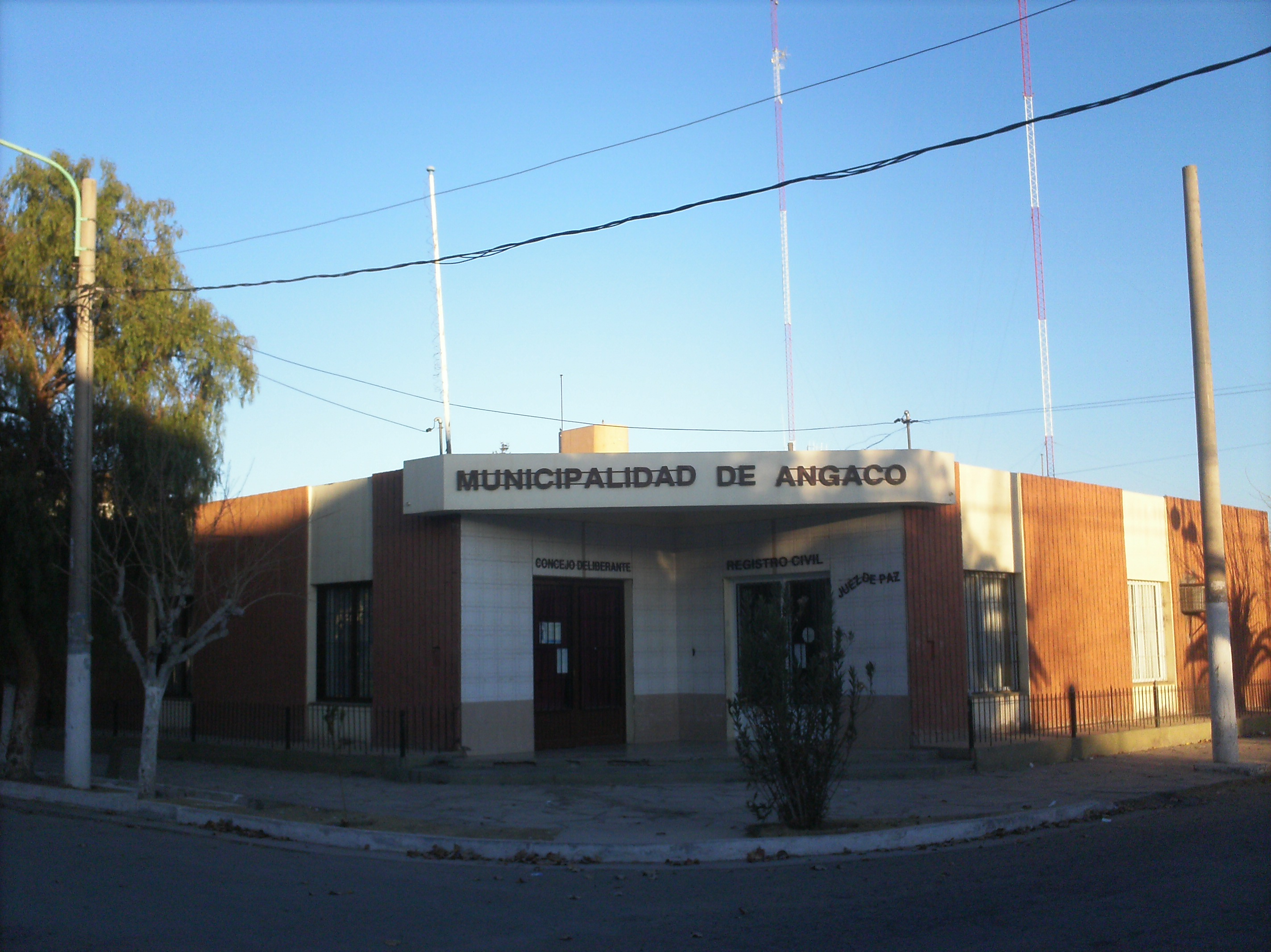

- Location of the locality in Argentina Villa del Salvador (Argentina)
- Coordinates: 31°27′11″S 68°24′14″W
- Country: Argentina
- Province: San Juan
- Department: Angaco
- Elevation: 616 m (2,021 ft)

Population (2010)
  - Total: 110
- Time zone: UTC−3 (ART)

Villa del Salvador is a locality in Argentina, located in the south-central province of San Juan, in the extreme northwest of the agricultural oasis of the Tulum Valley, northwest of the city of San Juan. It is the head town and seat of government of the Angaco Department. It also has the particularity of extending in small parcels to the south occupying another jurisdiction, such as the San Martín Department. It is the nucleus of a wine-growing region.
