= Francisco Domingo Díaz =

Francisco Domingo Díaz Oro
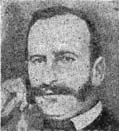

Governor of San Juan Province, Argentina
- In office 11 January 1855 – 18 March 1857
- Preceded by: Nazario Benavídez
- Succeeded by: Nazario Benavídez

Governor of San Juan Province, Argentina
- In office 1 March 1861 – 3 January 1862
- Preceded by: Filomeno Valenzuela
- Succeeded by: Domingo Faustino Sarmiento

Personal details
- Party: Federalist

Francisco Domingo Díaz Oro was a colonel in the army of the Argentinian Confederation. He fought at the Battle of Angaco and was twice governor of San Juan Province, Argentina. He was a member of the Federalist Party but his administration was largely influenced by the Unitarian Party. His son Ramón Díaz was an outstanding lawman in La Rioja Province.

== Battle of Angaco ==
Francisco Domingo Díaz participated with the rank of colonel in the Battle of Angaco in the Federalist Cazadores Battalion, composed of troops from San Juan. He was placed in charge of the battalion at the start of the battle after the death of Colonel José Manuel Espinosa. Towards the end of the combat he was ordered by General José Félix Aldao to advance through a deep ditch with his infantry battalion of 350 men, accompanied by a similar number of men from the Mendoza Auxiliary Battalion, to take the artillery battery of the Unitarian Mariano Acha. Only 157 of the men from the two battalions survived. This battle, and this action, have been called the bloodiest of the Argentine Civil Wars.

== First governorship (1855 - 1857) ==
On 4 January 1855 the Chamber of Representatives of San Juan accepted the resignation of governor Nazario Benavídez. On 21 January 1855, Díaz was appointed interim Governor. Díaz was later elected Governor in a popular vote. During his first term the first constitutional convention of the province was called, and a provincial constitution was issued in accordance with the Constitution of 1853. This was the first provincial constitution that defined the organization of the powers of the state, the functioning of institutions and electoral mechanisms. Its preamble did not invoke God as the source of all reason and justice, something unheard of at the time.

The reforms undertaken during his administration covered a wide spectrum: justice, politics, education, military and culture. The reforms caused problems with the judiciary, the Catholic Church and the military. The army was in charge of the caudillo Benavídez, who had been governor for twelve years before Díaz took office. Soon after taking office, Díaz appointed a commission to undertake the impeachment trial of Nazario Benavidez, the outgoing governor. The Commission declined to proceed.

=== Tension with the church ===
Díaz accused the bishop Timoteo Maradona of being allied to the Unitarian Party. Nazario Benavidez was a friend of Maradona and defended the bishop, who enjoyed wide influence in much of the population. During his previous government, Benavidez had asked Maradona for documents to justify his tenure as vicar of the Diocese of San Juan de Cuyo. Maradona replied that he ruled as a vicar in vacancy, delegated by the Bishop José Manuel Quiroga Sarmiento. Díaz, as vice-patron of the church under powers delegated by the National Executive, created new parishes, expropriated the hospice of the church of Our Lady of Mercy, required reports on the finances of the bishopric and again requested documents which showed the appointment of Timothy Maradona as bishop. This led to extremely tense relations between the government and the church.

In mid July 1856 the crisis erupted and Díaz issued a decision that denied the legitimacy of Maradona as bishop and ordering sanctions against clergy who obeyed him. Maradona did not recognize the decree and continued in his post. In November 1856 Díaz again disputed the investiture of Maradona and ordered his capture and confinement. The national government, reacting to the crisis in the province, ordered restitution of Maradona. Díaz proved to Justo José de Urquiza that Benavídez had created the conflict.

=== Constitution of San Juan ===
During Díaz's government the first Constitutional Convention of the province was convened, and drafted a constitution for the province of San Juan in 1856. It took as a basis the constitutions in force in San Luis Province and Mendoza Province. The convention was chaired by Nazario Benavidez and consisted of 40 deputies. The constitution was not innovative in its provisions compared to those already existing in other provinces, but omitted the preamble invoking God as the source of all reason and justice and the maintenance of the cult suppressed by the state.

=== Work of government ===
The Confederation of Argentine created a National Post, provincial customs were abolished and a Revenue Management system was created for the whole country. These changes affected the province, where provincial delegations were installed. A census was conducted in 1857 by order of the Argentina Confederation . There were two models of free schools for both sexes and a public school for boys. Díaz reforested the central square of the province. He completely reorganized the judiciary, which caused serious problems in its operation. He re-installed the Court of Justice as the ultimate authority.

== Revolution of 1857 ==
On 17 March 1857 there was a military revolution that put Nazario Benavidez in the office of acting governor, replacing Francisco Diaz who was accused of having turned towards the liberal sector of Buenos Aires. The revolt did not involve bloodshed and part of the civilian population participated. The governor did oppose the revolutionaries. The Confederation Argentina, which supported Benavidez, promptly sent a commission that assumed the government and called elections for governor. Díaz retained his rank and functions in the army after leaving the governorship. When Nazario Benavidez was imprisoned, he addressed Governor Manuel José Gómez Rufino, asking him not assassinate Benavidez but to release him. During the government of Francisco Coll he was appointed police chief.

== Second governorship ==
After what was called the Second Battle of the Rinconada del Pocito the Federalists assumed power in San Juan. Juan Saá took over the government and appointed Lieutenant Colonel Filomeno Valenzuela of the National Guard as governor. Eight days later, on 27 February 1861, he was overthrown in a bloodless coup by Díaz. On 1 March 1861 Díaz assumed the governorship. With the defeat of the Confederacy Argentina in the Battle of Pavón (17 September 1861) Diaz left the government of the province and fled at the approach of the Liberal troops. Domingo Faustino Sarmiento was appointed governor in his place.
