= Angaco Department =

Angaco Departamento Angaco
- Department
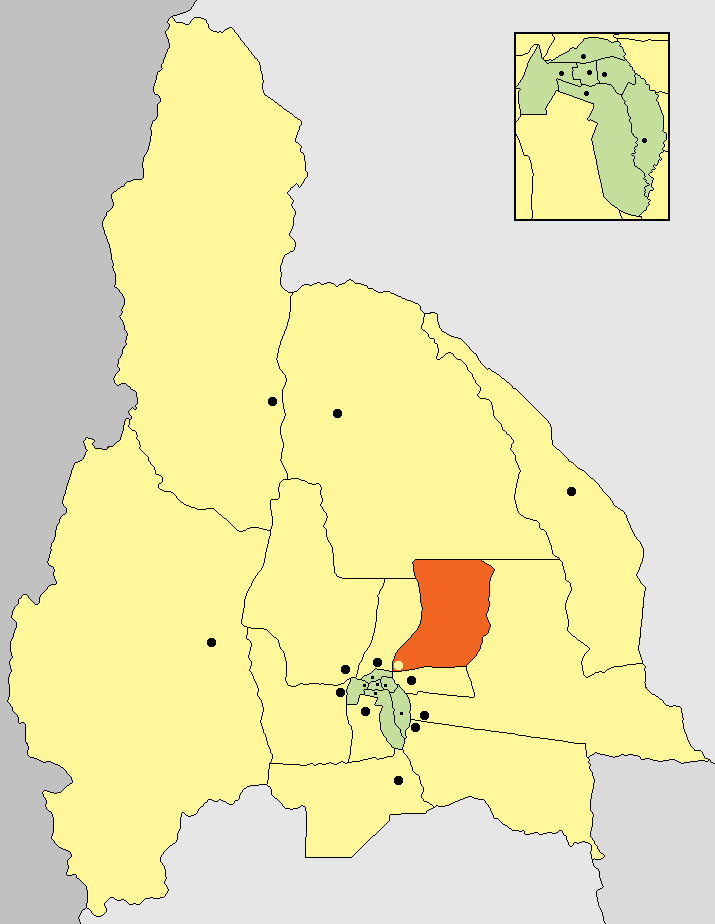
- location of Departamento Angaco in San Juan Province
- Coordinates: 31°24′S 68°22′W
- Country: Argentina
- Established: March 16, 1816
- Founder: Salvador María del Carril
- Seat: Villa del Salvador

Government
  - Intendant: José Castro

Area
  - Total: 1.865 km^{2} (0.720 sq mi)

Population (2001 census [INDEC])
  - Total: 7,570
  - Density: 4,060/km^{2} (10,500/sq mi)
- Demonym: angaquero/a
- Postal Code: 5400
- IFAM: SJU002
- Area Code: 0264
- Patron saint: Virgen del Carmen

Angaco is a department of the province of San Juan, Argentina. It is located in the center east of the province, especially in a desert landscape with mountains. Characterized by their remarkable wine production.

In November 2023, the Chinese mining company Hua Lian Mining announced the exploration of lithium in the San Juan province, specifically in an area that includes Angaco and Mogna.

== Toponymy ==
Angaco home means Araucanian water or streams that are at the foot of a hill.
