= Felipe Varela =

Spanish fashion designer

Felipe Varela is a Spanish fashion designer.

== Early career ==
Felipe Varela studied design and pattern design at Esmod College in Paris. He went on to study Haute Couture and Textiles at the I.F.M., where he was awarded with the Oscar for Young Designer.

As a student in Paris, Varela worked for international fashion houses such as Kenzo, Dior, Thierry Mugler, Lanvin, Angelo Tarlazzi and Torrente.

== Felipe Varela brand ==
In January 1996 he arrived in Madrid, where he set up his eponymous brand Felipe Varela brand. In 1996, he started showing his creations at the Cibeles Madrid Fashion Week. In 1998, he opened his first Madrid store, on the street José Ortega y Gasset 30.

In 2000, he opened a chain of Felipe Varela boutiques in El Corte Inglés department stores.

In 2016 as a part of the 20th anniversary of the brand, Felipe Varela made a comeback to Cibeles Madrid Fashion Week with a collection called Crystal Army. Launching as a part of this anniversary a new brand called VARELA, maintaining all the key aspects of Felipe Varela but more focused on a younger clientele.

== Notable clients ==
Queen Letizia of Spain wore Felipe Varela when welcoming President Sarkozy and Carla Bruni to Spain in 2009, and to the wedding of the Duke and Duchess of Cambridge in 2011.

In 2014 at the Proclamation of King Felipe VI of Spain, Queen Letizia also wore a creation of Felipe Varela.

In July 2017 took place the royal visit of the King of Spain and the Queen of Spain to the United Kingdom. During the Royal Visit, Queen Letizia of Spain wore Felipe Varela.
