= Domingo Faustino Sarmiento =

President of Argentina from 1868 to 1874

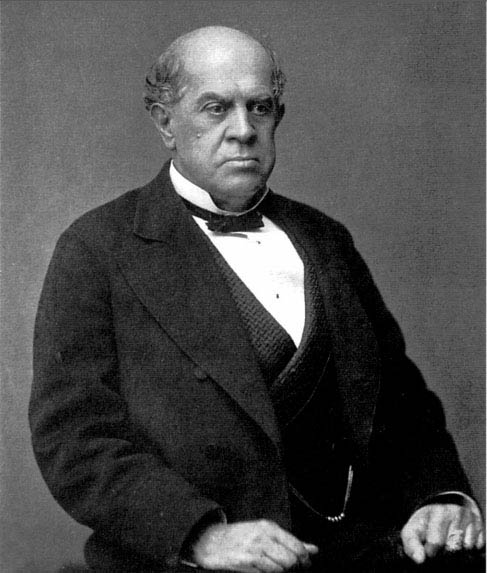
- Portrait, c. 1874

7th President of Argentina
- In office 12 October 1868 – 11 October 1874
- Vice President: Adolfo Alsina
- Preceded by: Bartolomé Mitre
- Succeeded by: Nicolás Avellaneda

Minister of Foreign Affairs and Worship
- In office 6 September 1879 – 9 October 1879
- President: Nicolás Avellaneda
- Preceded by: Manuel Montes de Oca
- Succeeded by: Lucas González

Minister of the Interior
- In office 29 August 1879 – 9 October 1879
- President: Nicolás Avellaneda
- Preceded by: Bernardo de Irigoyen
- Succeeded by: Benjamín Zorrilla

Governor of San Juan
- In office 3 January 1862 – 9 April 1864
- Preceded by: Francisco Domingo Díaz
- Succeeded by: Santiago Lloveras

Personal details
- Born: 15 February 1811 San Juan, Provinces of the Río de la Plata
- Died: 11 September 1888 (aged 77) Asunción, Paraguay
- Party: Liberal
- Spouse: Benita Martínez Pastoriza (m. 1847; sep. 1857)
- Domestic partner(s): Aurelia Vélez Sársfield (1857–1888)
- Children: Ana Faustina (Note: With María Jesus del Canto); Domingo Fidel (Note: A.K.A. Dominguito, born Domingo Fidel Castro Martínez, natural child of Domingo Castro y Calvo with Benita Martínez Pastoriza)

Military service
- Allegiance: Argentina
- Branch/service: Argentine Army
- Years of service: 1834–1863
- Rank: Divisional General

Domingo Faustino Sarmiento (Note: Spanish: [doˈmiŋɡo saɾˈmjento]) (15 February 1811 – 11 September 1888) was President of Argentina from 1868 to 1874. He was a member of a group of intellectuals, known as the Generation of 1837, who had a great influence on 19th-century Argentina.

Sarmiento grew up in a poor but politically active family that paved the way for many of his future accomplishments. Between 1843 and 1850, he was frequently in exile, and wrote in both Chile and in Argentina. His most famous work was Facundo, a critique of Juan Manuel de Rosas, that Sarmiento wrote while working for the newspaper El Progreso during his exile in Chile. The book brought him far more than just literary recognition; he expended his efforts and energy on the war against dictatorships, specifically that of Rosas, and contrasted enlightened Europe—a world where, in his eyes, democracy, social services, and intelligent thought were valued—with the barbarism of the gaucho and especially the caudillo, the ruthless strongmen of 19th-century Argentina.

As president, Sarmiento championed intelligent thought—including education for children and women—and democracy for Latin America. He also modernized and developed train systems, a postal system, and a comprehensive education system. He spent many years in ministerial roles on the federal and state levels where he travelled abroad and examined other education systems.

Sarmiento died in Asunción, Paraguay, at the age of 77 from a heart attack. He was buried in Buenos Aires. Today, he is respected as a political innovator and writer. Miguel de Unamuno considered him among the greatest writers of Castilian prose.

== Youth and influences ==
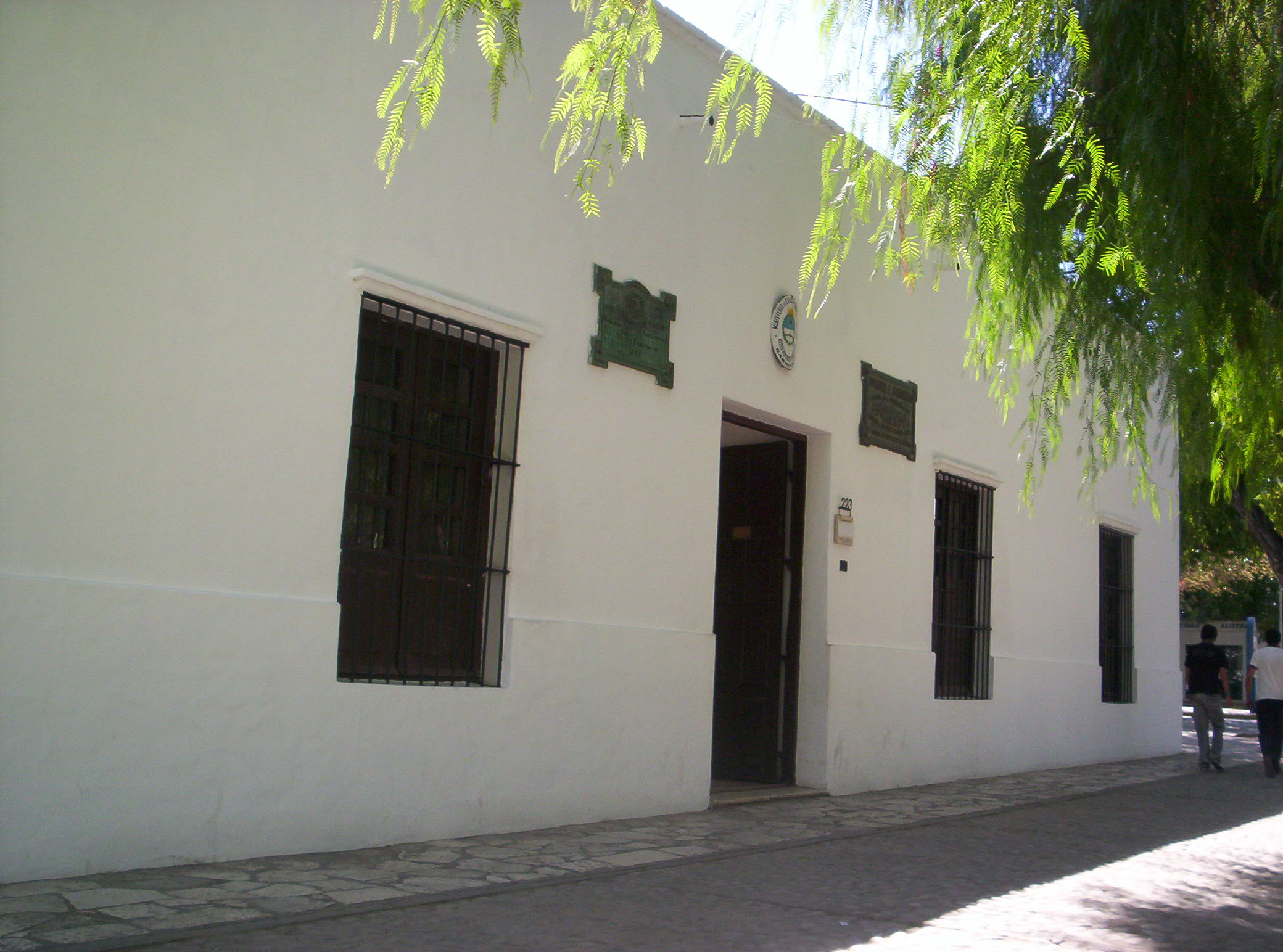
Façade of Sarmiento's childhood home in San Juan, Argentina.

Sarmiento was born in Carrascal, a poor suburb of San Juan, Argentina, on 15 February 1811. His father, José Clemente Quiroga Sarmiento y Funes, had served in the military during the wars of independence, returning prisoners of war to San Juan. His mother, Doña Paula Zoila de Albarracín e Irrazábal, was a very pious woman, who lost her father at a young age and was left with very little to support herself. As a result, she took to selling her weaving in order to afford to build a house of her own. On 21 September 1801, José and Paula were married. They had 15 children, 9 of whom died young; Domingo was the only son to survive to adulthood. Sarmiento was greatly influenced by his parents, his mother who was always working hard, and his father who told stories of being a patriot and serving his country, something Sarmiento strongly believed in. In Sarmiento's own words:

I was born in a family that lived long years in mediocrity bordering on destitution, and which is to this day poor in every sense of the word. My father is a good man whose life has nothing remarkable except [for his] having served in subordinate positions in the War of Independence... My mother is the true figure of Christianity in its purest sense; with her, trust in Providence was always the solution to all difficulties in life."

At the age of four, Sarmiento was taught to read by his father and his uncle, José Eufrasio Quiroga Sarmiento, who later became Bishop of Cuyo. Another uncle who influenced him in his youth was Domingo de Oro, a notable figure in the young Argentine Republic who was influential in bringing Juan Manuel de Rosas to power. Though Sarmiento did not follow de Oro's political and religious leanings, he learned the value of intellectual integrity and honesty. He developed scholarly and oratorical skills, qualities which de Oro was famous for.

In 1816, at the age of five, Sarmiento began attending the primary school La Escuela de la Patria. He was a good student, and earned the title of First Citizen (Primer Ciudadano) of the school. After completing primary school, his mother wanted him to go to Córdoba to become a priest. He had spent a year reading the Bible and often spent time as a child helping his uncle with church services, but Sarmiento soon became bored with religion and school, and got involved with a group of aggressive children. Sarmiento's father took him to the Loreto Seminary in 1821, but for reasons unknown, Sarmiento did not enter the seminary, returning instead to San Juan with his father. In 1823, the Minister of State, Bernardino Rivadavia, announced that the six top pupils of each state would be selected to receive higher education in Buenos Aires. Sarmiento was at the top of the list in San Juan, but it was then announced that only ten pupils would receive the scholarship. The selection was made by lot, and Sarmiento was not one of the scholars whose name was drawn.

Like many other nineteenth-century Argentines prominent in public life, he was a Freemason. (Note: The list includes Juan Bautista Alberdi, Manuel Alberti, Carlos María de Alvear, Miguel de Azcuénaga, Antonio González de Balcarce, Manuel Belgrano, Antonio Luis Beruti, Juan José Castelli, Domingo French, Gregorio Aráoz de Lamadrid, Francisco Narciso de Laprida, Juan Larrea, Juan Lavalle, Vicente López y Planes, Bartolomé Mitre, Mariano Moreno, Juan José Paso, Carlos Pellegrini, Gervasio Antonio de Posadas, Domingo Faustino Sarmiento, and Justo José de Urquiza. José de San Martín is known to have been a member of the Lautaro Lodge; but whether the lodge was truly masonic has been debated: Denslow, William R. (1957). 10,000 Famous Freemasons. Vol. 1–4. Richmond, VA: Macoy Publishing & Masonic Supply Co Inc.)

== Political background and exiles ==
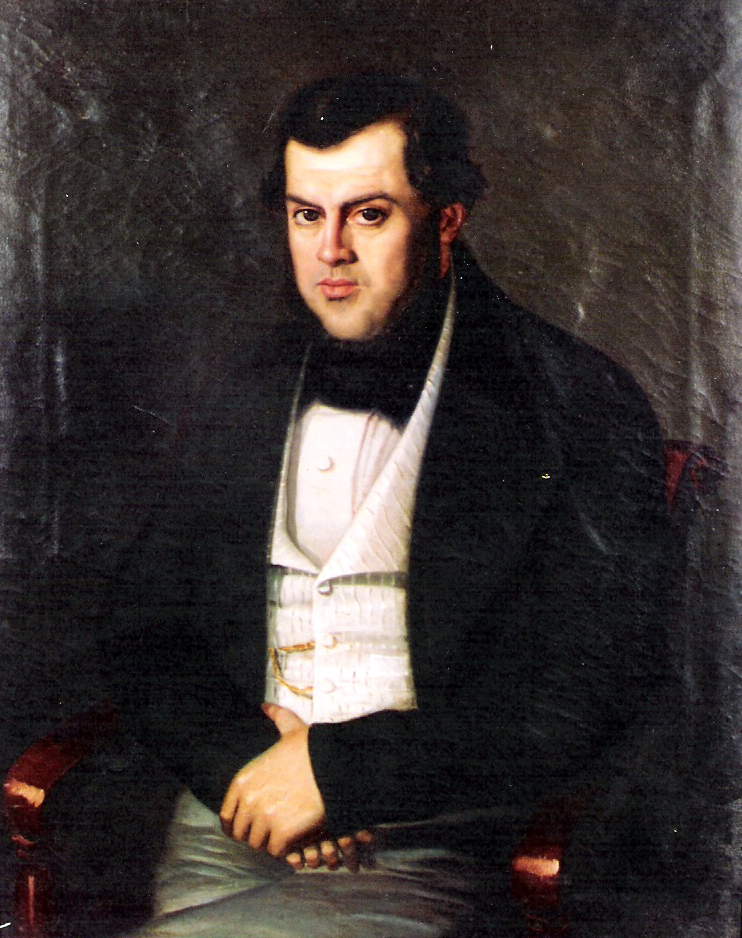
1845 portrait of Sarmiento during his exile in Chile, by Franklin Rawson.

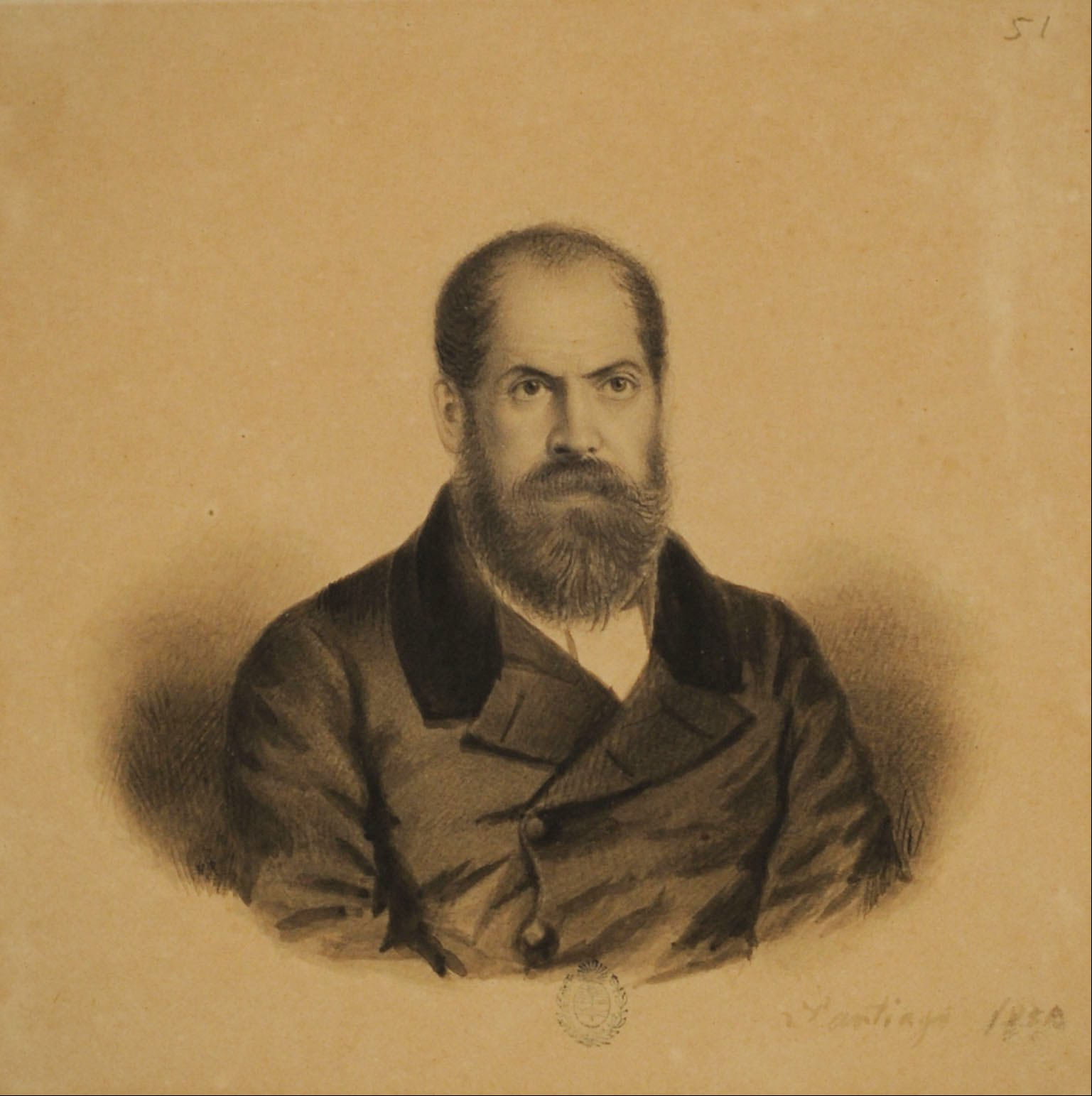
Sarmiento portrayed by Ignacio Baz.

In 1826, an assembly elected Bernardino Rivadavia as president of the United Provinces of the Río de la Plata. This action roused the ire of the provinces, and civil war was the result. Support for a strong, centralized Argentine government was based in Buenos Aires, and gave rise to two opposing groups. The wealthy and educated of the Unitarian Party, such as Sarmiento, favored centralized government. In opposition to them were the Federalists, who were mainly based in rural areas and tended to reject European mores. Numbering figures such as Manuel Dorrego and Juan Facundo Quiroga among their ranks, they were in favor of a loose federation with more autonomy for the individual provinces.

Opinion of the Rivadavia administration was divided between the two ideologies. For Unitarians like Sarmiento, Rivadavia's presidency was a positive experience. He set up a European-staffed university and supported a public education program for rural male children. He also supported theater and opera groups, publishing houses and a museum. These contributions were considered as civilizing influences by the Unitarians, but they upset the Federalist constituency. Common laborers had their salaries subjected to a government cap, and the gauchos were arrested by Rivadavia for vagrancy and forced to work on public projects, usually without pay.

In 1827, the Unitarians were challenged by Federalist forces. After the resignation of Rivadavia, Manuel Dorrego was installed as governor of Buenos Aires province. He quickly made peace with Brazil but, on returning to Argentina, was overthrown and executed by the Unitarian general Juan Lavalle, who took Dorrego's place. However, Lavalle did not spend long as governor either: he was soon overthrown by militias composed largely of gauchos led by Rosas and Estanislao López. By the end of 1829 the old legislature that Lavalle had disbanded was back in place and had appointed Rosas as governor of Buenos Aires.

The first time Sarmiento was forced to leave home was with his uncle, José de Oro, in 1827, because of his military activities. José de Oro was a priest who had fought in the Battle of Chacabuco under General San Martín. Together, Sarmiento and de Oro went to San Francisco del Monte de Oro, in the neighbour province of San Luis. He spent much of his time with his uncle learning and began to teach at the only school in town. Later that year, his mother wrote to him asking him to come home. Sarmiento refused, only to receive a response from his father that he was coming to collect him. His father had persuaded the governor of San Juan to send Sarmiento to Buenos Aires to study at the College of Moral Sciences (Colegio de Ciencias Morales).

Soon after Sarmiento's return, the province of San Juan broke out into civil war and Facundo Quiroga invaded Sarmiento's town. As historian William Katra describes this "traumatic experience":

At sixteen years of age, he stood in front of the shop he tended and viewed the entrance into San Juan of Facundo Quiroga and some six hundred mounted montonera horsemen. They constituted an unsettling presence [. . . ]. That sight, with its overwhelmingly negative associations, left an indelible impression on his budding consciousness. For the impressionable youth Quiroga's ascent to protagonist status in the province's affairs was akin to the rape of civilized society by incarnated evil.

Unable to attend school in Buenos Aires due to the political turmoil, Sarmiento chose to fight against Quiroga. He joined and fought in the unitarian army, only to be placed under house arrest when San Juan was eventually taken over by Quiroga after the battle of Pilar. He was later released, only to join the forces of General Paz, a key unitarian figure.

=== First exile in Chile ===
Fighting and war soon resumed, but, one by one, Quiroga vanquished the main allies of General Paz, including the Governor of San Juan, and in 1831 Sarmiento fled to Chile. He did not return to Argentina for five years. At the time, Chile was noted for its good public administration, its constitutional organization, and the rare freedom to criticize the regime. In Sarmiento's view, Chile had "Security of property, the continuation of order, and with both of these, the love of work and the spirit of enterprise that causes the development of wealth and prosperity."

As a form of freedom of expression, Sarmiento began to write political commentary. In addition to writing, he also began teaching in Los Andes. Due to his innovative style of teaching, he found himself in conflict with the governor of the province. He founded his own school in Pocuro as a response to the governor. During this time, Sarmiento fell in love and had an illegitimate daughter named Ana Faustina, who Sarmiento did not acknowledge until she married.

=== San Juan and second and third exiles in Chile ===
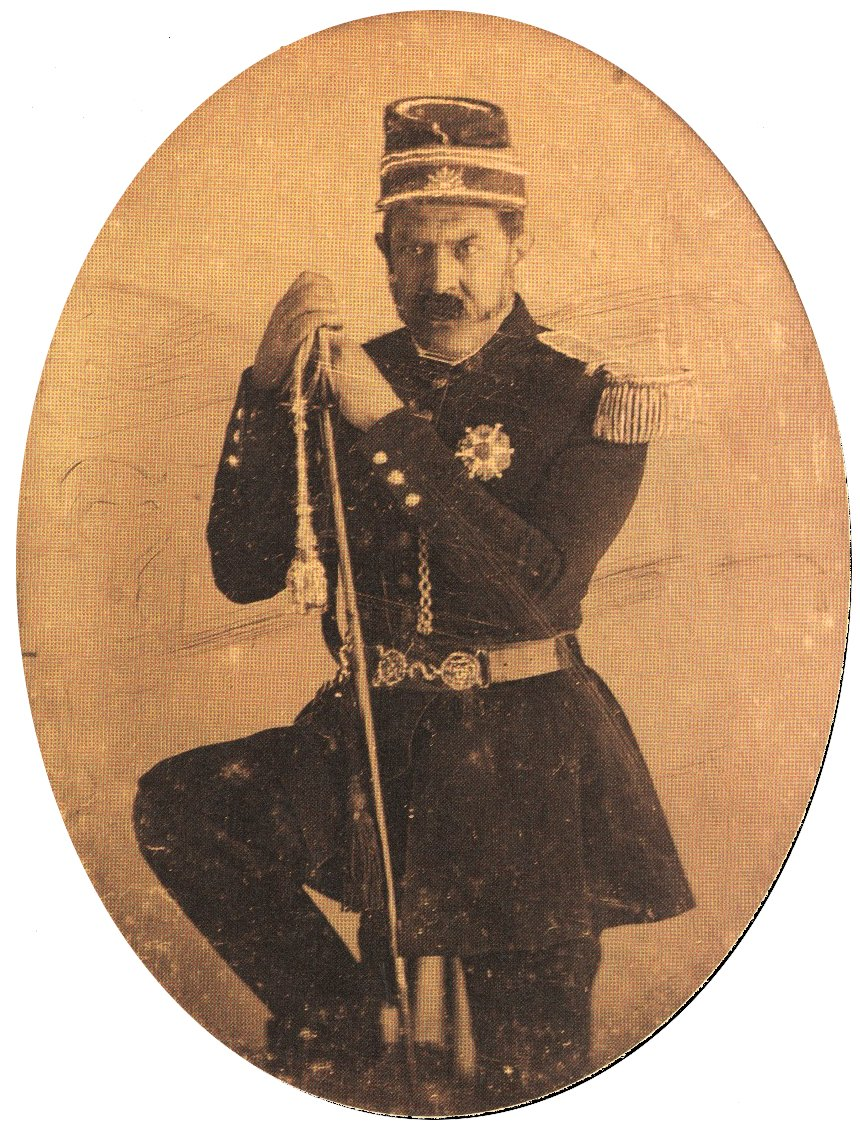
Daguerreotype of Domingo Faustino Sarmiento after the Battle of Caseros. He is wearing the Brazilian Imperial Order of the Southern Cross given to him by Emperor Pedro II of Brazil during his exile in Petrópolis in 1852

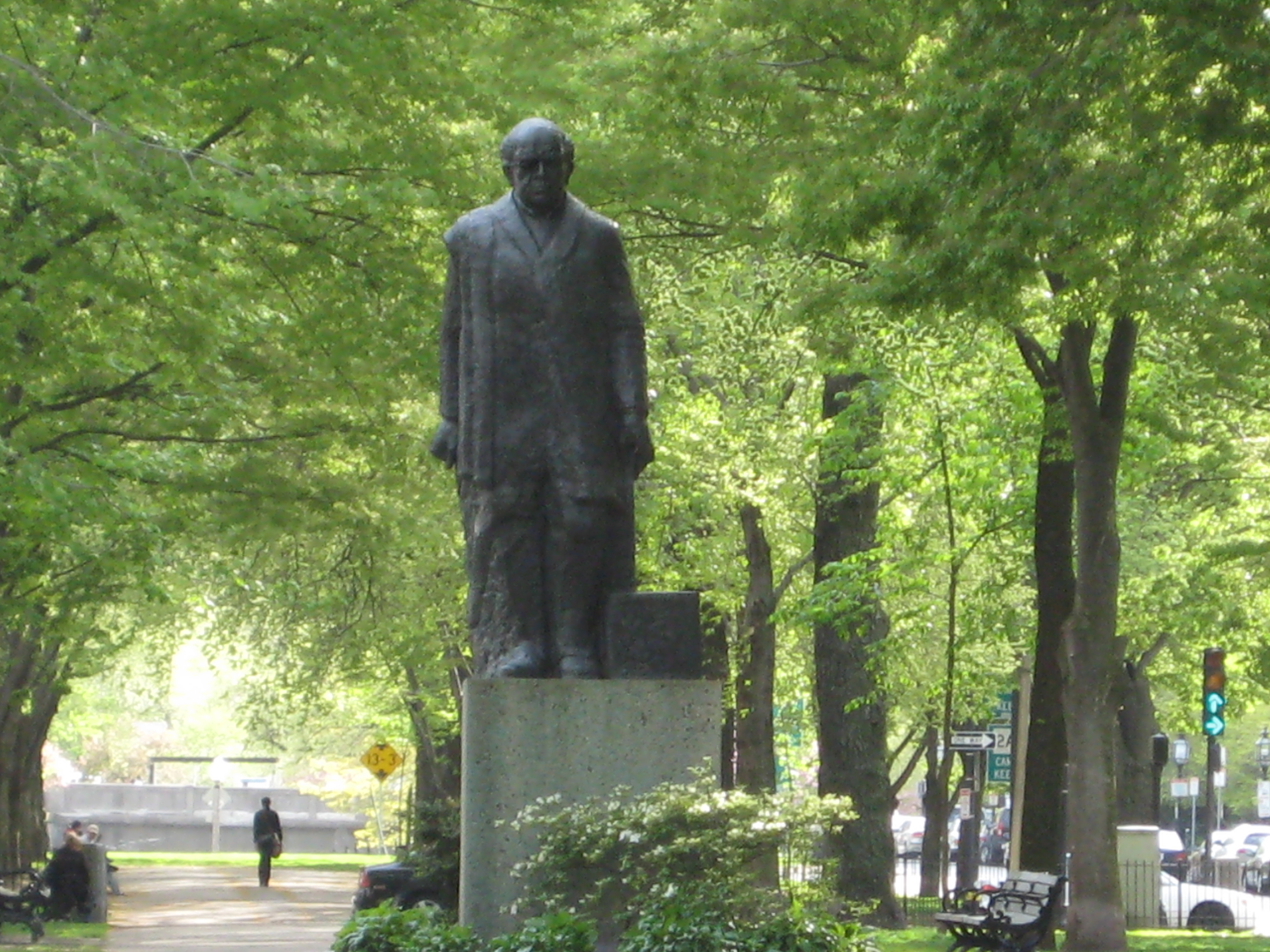
Monument in homage to Domingo F. Sarmiento in Boston, Massachusetts

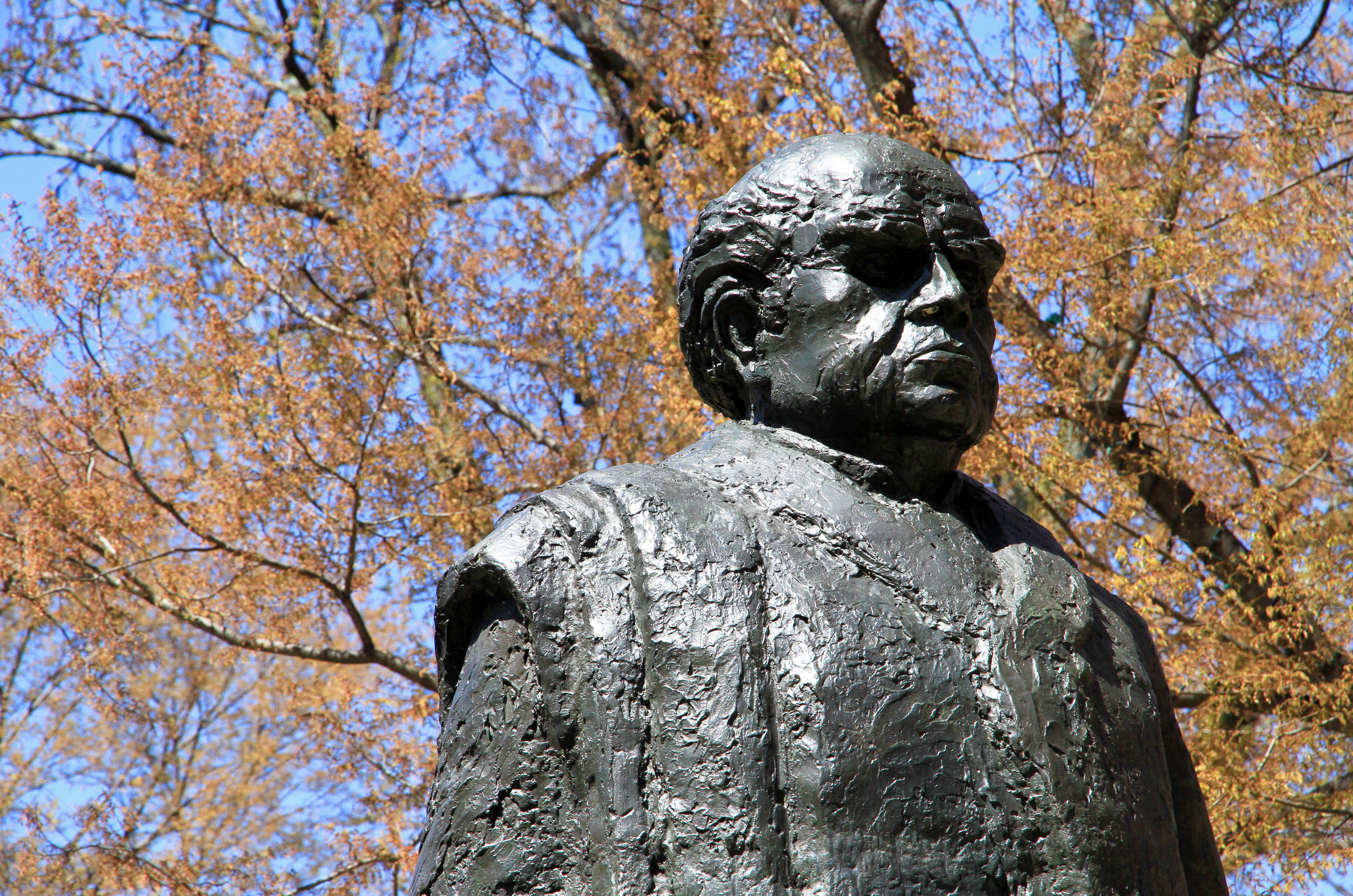
Domingo Faustino Sarmiento in Boston, Massachusetts

In 1836, Sarmiento returned to San Juan, seriously ill with typhoid fever; his family and friends thought he would die upon his return, but he recovered and established an anti-federalist journal called El Zonda. The government of San Juan did not like Sarmiento's criticisms and censored the magazine by imposing an unaffordable tax upon each purchase. Sarmiento was forced to cease publication of the magazine in 1840. He also founded a school for girls during this time called the Santa Rosa High School, which was a preparatory school. In addition to the school, he founded a Literary Society.

It is around this time that Sarmiento became associated with the so-called "Generation of 1837". This was a group of activists, who included Esteban Echeverría, Juan Bautista Alberdi, and Bartolomé Mitre, who spent much of the 1830s to 1880s first agitating for and then bringing about social change, advocating republicanism, free trade, freedom of speech, and material progress. Though, based in San Juan, Sarmiento was absent from the initial creation of this group, in 1838 he wrote to Alberdi seeking the latter's advice; and in time he would become the group's most fervent supporter.

In 1840, after being arrested and accused of conspiracy, Sarmiento was forced into exile in Chile again. It was en route to Chile that, in the baths of Zonda, he wrote the graffiti "On ne tue point les idées," an incident that would later serve as the preface to his book Facundo. Once on the other side of the Andes, in 1841 Samiento started writing for the Valparaíso newspaper El Mercurio, as well working as a publisher of the Crónica Contemporánea de Latino América ("Contemporary Latin American Chronicle"). In 1842, Sarmiento was appointed the Director of the first Normal School in South America; the same year he also founded the newspaper El Progreso. During this time he sent for his family from San Juan to Chile. In 1843, Sarmiento published Mi Defensa ("My Defence"), while continuing to teach. And in May 1845, El Progreso started the serial publication of the first edition of his best-known work, Facundo; in July, Facundo appeared in book form.

Between the years 1845 and 1847, Sarmiento travelled on behalf of the Chilean government across parts of South America to Uruguay, Brazil, to Europe, France, Spain, Algeria, Italy, Armenia, Switzerland, England, to Cuba, and to North America, the United States and Canada in order to examine different education systems and the levels of education and communication. Sarmiento began his visit to the United States with a mere six hundred dollars from the Chilean government, much of the former allowance being expended on preceding journeys to Africa and Europe. As a result, he planned to visit as much of the country as financially possible and end his journey in Havana, where he would take the role of a teacher and journalist to earn more funds to finance future journeys across the American continents. However, Sarmiento discarded this plan upon meeting Santiago Arcos, a Chilean journalist who agreed to defraying the expenses of subsequent journeys. Sarmiento initially could not locate or find any information about the whereabouts of Arcos, but the two eventually met in Philadelphia. During his visit to the United States, Sarmiento visited major locations such as Boston, Washington, D.C., and New Orleans. Sarmiento would again travel to the United States from the years 1865 to 1868 when serving as Argentina's minister plenipotentiary to the country. Based on his travels, he wrote the book Viajes por Europa, África, y América which was published in 1849.

In 1848, Sarmiento voluntarily left to Chile once again. During the same year, he met widow Benita Martínez Pastoriza, married her, and adopted her son, Domingo Fidel, or Dominguito, who would be killed in action during the War of the Triple Alliance at Curupaytí in 1866. Sarmiento continued to exercise the idea of freedom of the press and began two new periodicals entitled La Tribuna and La Crónica respectively, which strongly attacked Juan Manuel de Rosas. During this stay in Chile, Sarmiento's essays became more strongly opposed to Juan Manuel de Rosas. The Argentine government tried to have Sarmiento extradited from Chile to Argentina, but the Chilean government refused to hand him over.

In 1850, he published both Argirópolis and Recuerdos de Provincia (Recollections of a Provincial Past). In 1852, Rosas's regime was finally brought down. Sarmiento became involved in debates about the country's new constitution.

=== Return to Argentina ===
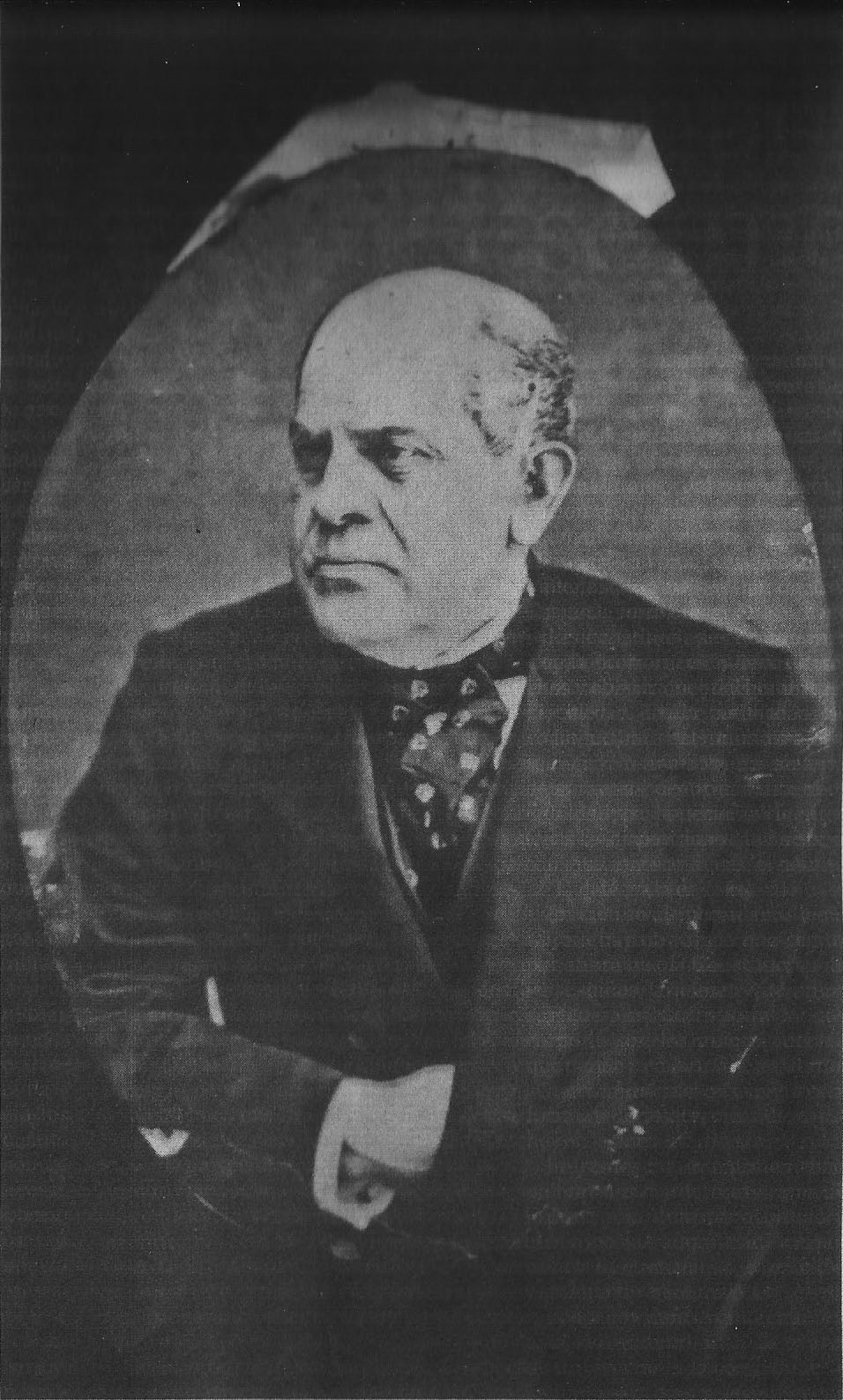
Sarmiento in 1864. Photograph by Eugenio Courret.

In 1854, Sarmiento briefly visited Mendoza, just across the border from Chile in Western Argentina, but he was arrested and imprisoned. Upon his release, he went back to Chile. But in 1855 he put an end to what was now his "self-imposed" exile in Chile: he arrived in Buenos Aires, soon to become editor-in-chief of the newspaper El Nacional. He was also appointed town councillor in 1856, and 1857 he joined the provincial Senate, a position he held until 1861.

It was in 1861, shortly after Mitre became Argentine president, that Sarmiento left Buenos Aires and returned to San Juan, where he was elected governor, a post he took up in 1862. It was then that he passed the Statutory Law of Public Education, making it mandatory for children to attend primary school. It allowed for a number of institutions to be opened including secondary schools, military schools and an all-girls school. While governor, he developed roads and infrastructure, built public buildings and hospitals, encouraged agriculture and allowed for mineral mining. He resumed his post as editor of El Zonda. In 1863, Sarmiento fought against the power of the caudillo of La Rioja and found himself in conflict with the Interior Minister of General Mitre's government, Guillermo Rawson. Sarmiento stepped down as governor of San Juan to become the Plenipotentiary Minister to the United States, where he was sent in 1865, soon after the assassination of President Abraham Lincoln. Moved by the story of Lincoln, Sarmiento ended up writing his book Vida de Lincoln. It was on this trip that Sarmiento received an honorary degree from the University of Michigan. A bust of him stood in the Modern Languages Building at the University of Michigan until multiple student protests prompted its removal. Students installed plaques and painted the bust red to represent the controversies surrounding his policies towards the indigenous people in Argentina. There still stands a statue of Sarmiento at Brown University. While on this trip, he was asked to run for President again. He won, taking office on 12 October 1868.

== Presidency (1868–1874) ==
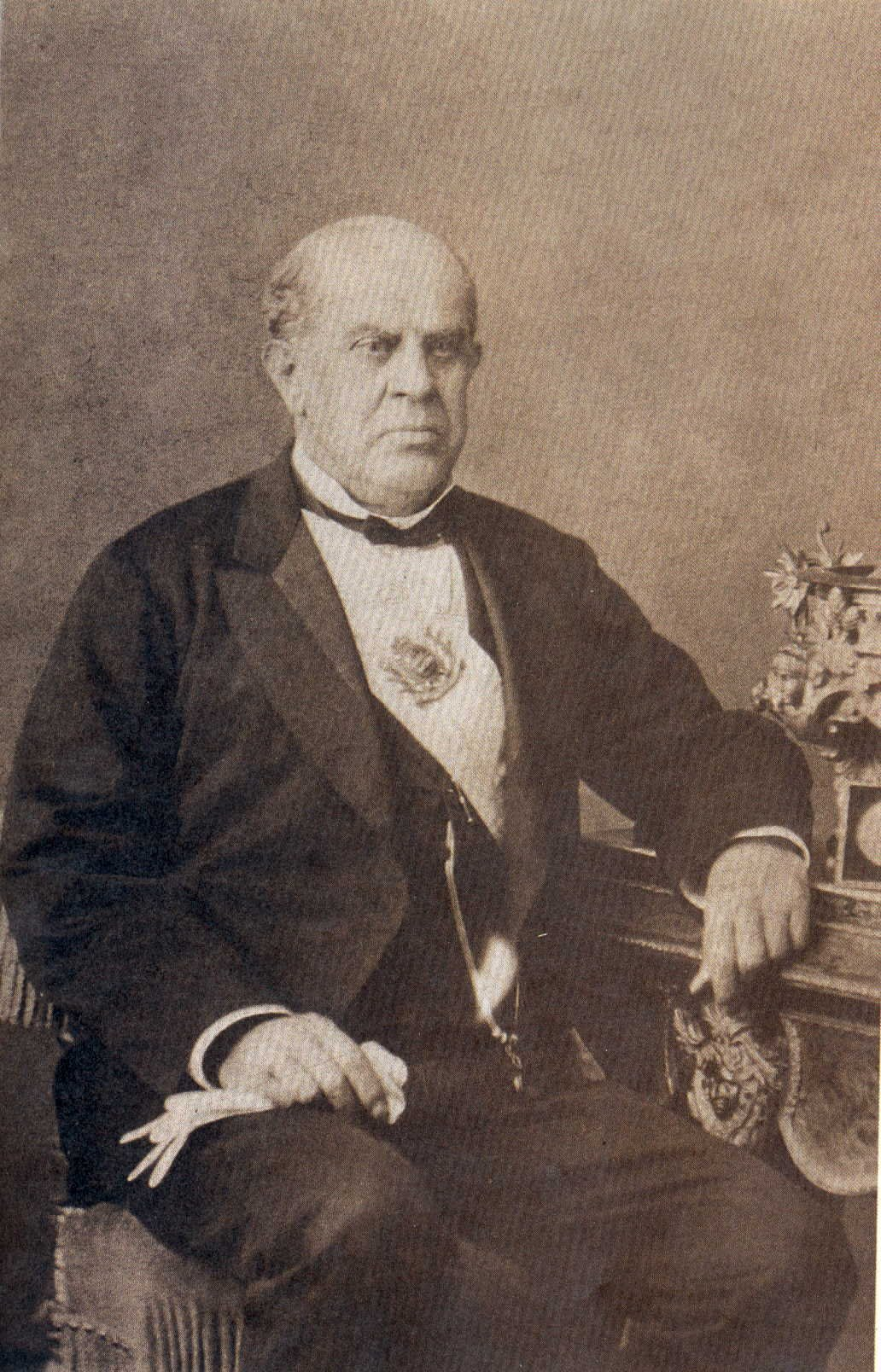
Portrait, 1873

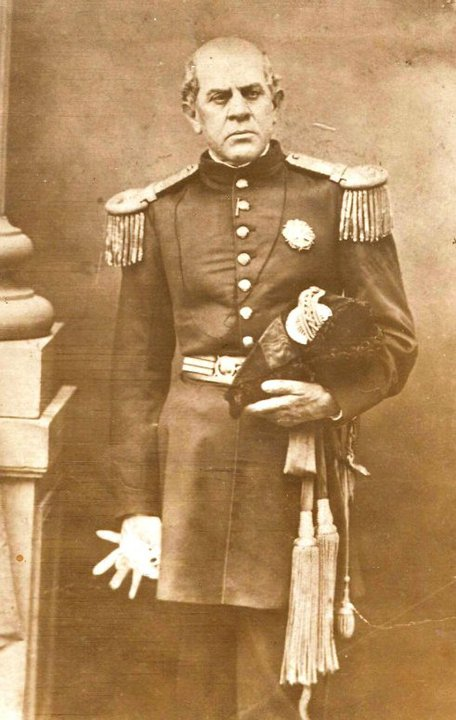
Sarmiento visiting the Exposition Universelle in Paris in 1867

=== Overview ===
Domingo Faustino Sarmiento was put forward as a candidate for the presidency of the nation by a group of Argentine politicians at the initiative of Colonel Lucio V. Mansilla. He won the presidency despite the maneuverings of his predecessor Bartolomé Mitre.

Two days after his inauguration, Congress met for a brief extraordinary session, during which it approved the budget for the following year, a loan of four million pesos, and an increase in customs duties in order to finance the continuation of the Paraguayan War.

Sarmiento served as President of Argentina from 1868 to 1874. According to biographer Allison Bunkley, his presidency "marks the advent of the middle, or land-owning classes as the pivot power of the nation. The age of the gaucho had ended, and the age of the merchant and cattleman had begun." Sarmiento sought to create basic freedoms, and wanted to ensure civil safety and progress for everyone, not just the few. Sarmiento's tour of the United States had given him many new ideas about politics, democracy, and the structure of society, especially when he was the Argentine ambassador to the country from 1865 to 1868. He found New England, specifically the Boston-Cambridge area to be the source of much of his influence, writing in an Argentine newspaper that New England was "the cradle of the modern republic, the school for all of America." He described Boston as "The pioneer city of the modern world, the Zion of the ancient Puritans ... Europe contemplates in New England the power which in the future will supplant her." Not only did Sarmiento evolve political ideas, but also structural ones by transitioning Argentina from a primarily agricultural economy to one focused on cities and industry.

Historian David Rock notes that, beyond putting an end to caudillismo, Sarmiento's main achievements in government concerned his promotion of education. Sarmiento's focus on education became a divisive tool of his nation-building strategy. With this focus, he was able to build the foundation to promote the intellect of future generations and securing their prosperity. There was an emphasis on constructing educational buildings, and training prospective teachers. His emphasis on constructing these schools and promoting education served as an example for future administrations to build upon. As stated by Garrard, Henderson, and McCann, this foundation would eventually make "the Argentine people among the most literate in the hemisphere." As Rock reports, "between 1868 and 1874 educational subsidies from the central government to the provinces quadrupled." He established 800 educational and military institutions, and his improvements to the educational system enabled 100,000 children to attend school.

He also pushed forward modernization more generally, building infrastructure including 5,000 kilometres (3,100 mi) of telegraph line across the country for improved communications, making it easier for the government in Buenos Aires and the provinces to communicate; modernizing the postal and train systems which he believed to be integral for interregional and national economies, as well as building the Red Line, a train line that would bring goods to Buenos Aires in order to better facilitate trade with Great Britain. By the end of his presidency, the Red Line extended 1,331 kilometres (827 mi). In 1869, he conducted Argentina's first national census.

Although the rapid expansion of the railroad promoted trade, Latin America saw a rise in inequality and an intensified pressure to drive indigenous people from their land in order to expand the economy. With the expansion of the railroad itself came an expansion of exploration, stimulated by the access to previously inaccessible lands. Sarmiento's successor, Nicolas Avellaneda, further promoted this policy. In the late 1870s Julio Roca, his minister of war, carried out the Conquest of the Desert. This war, stimulated by the expansion of Latin American railroads, was waged against the indigenous people of Southern Argentina. In addition to the expansion and driving out that was done by the people, the government had now officially declared its intentions. Following the model of displacement that had been outlined by North America, the Conquest of the Desert established the dominance of Argentina as a nation-state, and set a dangerous precedent. With this precedent, Argentine dominance cost the killing and displacement of the Mapuche people in the Patagonia providence. Though Sarmiento promoted modernization and growth that made Argentina stronger, the idea of expansion meant the expulsion and killings of indigenous peoples.

Though Sarmiento is well known historically, he was not a popular president. Indeed, Rock judges that "by and large his administration was a disappointment". During his presidency, Argentina conducted an unpopular war against Paraguay; at the same time, people were displeased with him for not fighting for the Straits of Magellan from Chile. Although he increased productivity, he increased expenditures, which also negatively affected his popularity. In addition, the arrival of a large influx of European immigrants was blamed for the outbreak of Yellow Fever in Buenos Aires and the risk of civil war. Moreover, Sarmiento's presidency was further marked by ongoing rivalry between Buenos Aires and the provinces. In the war against Paraguay, Sarmiento's adopted son was killed. Sarmiento suffered from immense grief and was thought to never have been the same again.

On 22 August 1873, Sarmiento survived an assassination attempt while on his way to the home of Vélez Sarsfield in the city of Buenos Aires. As he passed through what is now the intersection of Corrientes and Maipú streets, an explosion shook the coach carriage in which he was travelling. Sarmiento did not hear it, as he was already deaf. The shooters were two Italian anarchists, the brothers Francisco and Pedro Guerri, who declared that they had been hired by men of federal caudillo Ricardo López Jordán. The attempt failed because Francisco Guerri's blunderbuss burst in his hand. Sarmiento emerged from the attack unhurt.

A year later in 1874, he completed his term as President and stepped down, handing his presidency over to Nicolás Avellaneda, his former Minister of Education.

=== Education and culture ===
It is generally accepted that Domingo Faustino Sarmiento devoted most of his efforts in government to the promotion of education, although some historians maintain that he gave at least equal importance to expanding communications throughout the country.

In any case, the impetus given to education under the ministry of Nicolás Avellaneda was notable. Through the Subsidies Law of 1871—which assigned to public education inheritances without direct heirs and one eighth of the proceeds from sales of public land—the government guaranteed funding for the creation of new schools and the purchase of materials and books. During his presidency, and with national support, the provinces founded about 800 primary schools, bringing the total to 1,816 schools, of which 27% were private; the school population rose from 30,000 to 110,000 pupils.

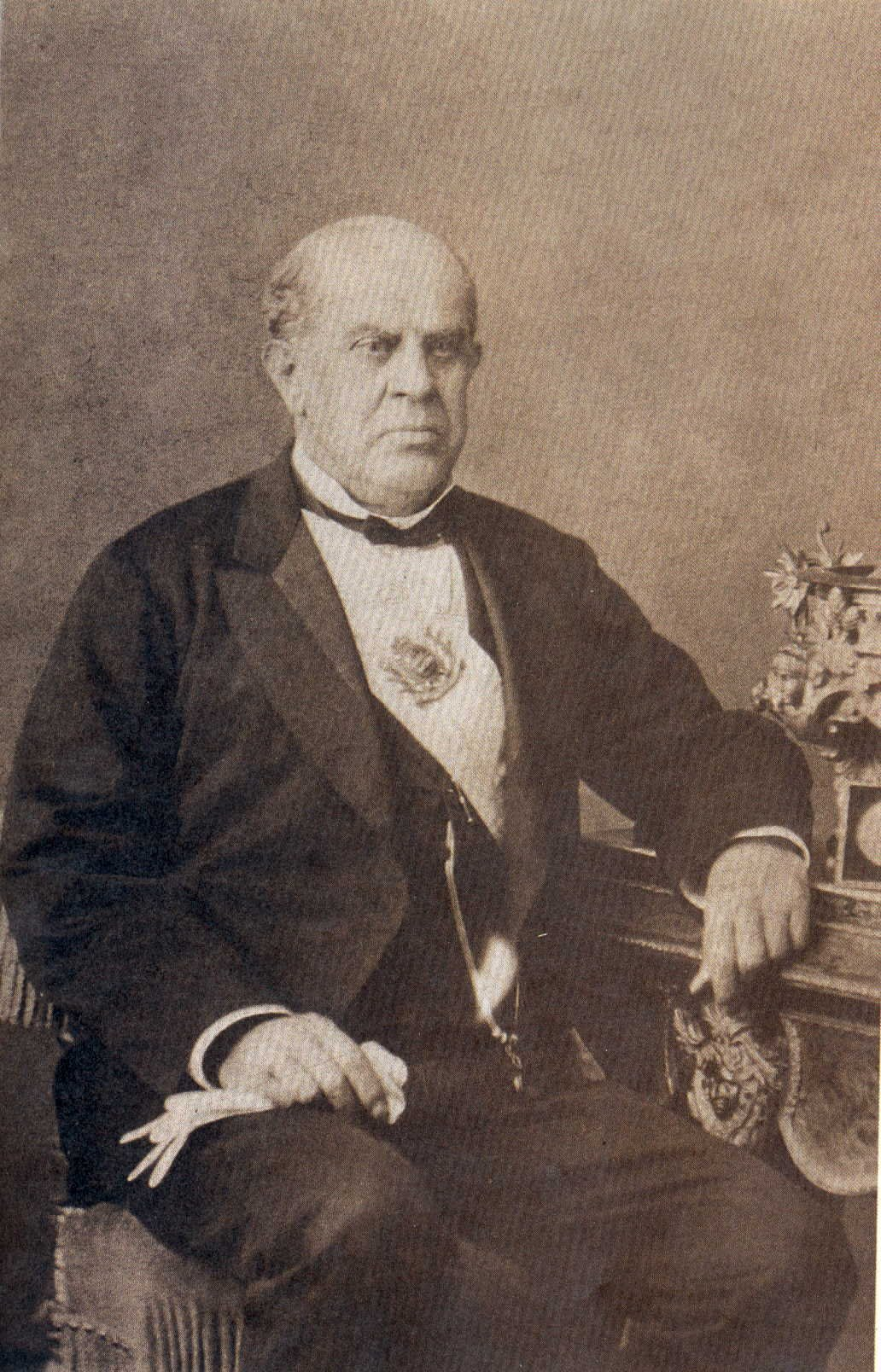
Domingo Faustino Sarmiento portrayed wearing the presidential sash in 1873.

To secure primary education, during the presidencies of Sarmiento, Avellaneda, and Roca, just over 75 teachers (71 women and 4 men) were brought from the United States to teach in primary teacher-training colleges (escuelas normales); he established the first normal schools, taking as a model the Paraná Normal School, founded in 1870. He also subsidized the first school for deaf students, which was privately run.

Continuing the policy of his predecessor, he founded National Colleges in La Rioja, Santa Fe, San Luis, San Salvador de Jujuy, Santiago del Estero, Corrientes, San Nicolás de los Arroyos, and Rosario.

That same year he promoted the creation and development of the Comisión Nacional de Bibliotecas Populares (CONABIP), which to this day supports and strengthens popular libraries as civil-society organizations and encourages their public recognition as physical and social spaces important to community development and the construction of citizenship.

One of his first decisions was to hold an Exposition of Arts and National Products, which was ultimately staged in 1871 in the city of Córdoba. The project was initially regarded as folly, but it ended up being a major success. It showcased textiles, tanneries, foundries, dyeworks, and agricultural products from different regions of the country. During his visit to the exposition, Sarmiento wore a vicuña suit made from national fabrics and also received a medal for having introduced wicker into the country. A large amount of agricultural and industrial machinery available for import was also promoted there. The exposition marked the beginning of a concern with the basic sciences, and from this impulse emerged the Academy of Sciences of Córdoba—directed by the German botanist Germán Burmeister—and the National Observatory of Córdoba, directed by the American astronomer Benjamin Gould.

At the National University of Córdoba the Faculty of Exact, Physical and Natural Sciences was created, offering a degree in engineering.

On 17 April 1853 he transformed his country's wine industry by introducing new French grape varieties, such as Malbec, and by creating the Quinta Agronómica of Mendoza, which later became the Faculty of Agricultural Sciences. Today, Malbec is one of the leading varieties in the Argentine wine market and an emblem of the country's viticulture.

=== End of the Paraguayan War ===
The War of the Triple Alliance against Paraguay had broken out during Mitre's presidency, and he had commanded the allied forces against that country until shortly before leaving office. Barely had Sarmiento assumed the presidency when the final Brazilian advance on Asunción took place, and the city was sacked by Brazilian troops. Paraguayan president Francisco Solano López, despite the occupation of the capital, organized a new army some distance away. In response, a provisional government was formed in Asunción under Argentine and Brazilian protection.

An army formed and led mainly by Brazilians—in which the Argentines at first had some participation—set out in pursuit of Solano López in the so-called Campaign of the Hills. After two bloody victories over the Paraguayans, Solano López managed to escape toward the northern edge of the country, where two Brazilian divisions eventually caught up with him, defeated him, and killed him at the Battle of Cerro Corá on 1 March 1870. The war was over.

Paraguay was left devastated: depending on the source, between 50 and 90% of its total population is estimated to have died during the conflict, and it lost all the territories in dispute with its neighbors except the Chaco Boreal.

The war also imposed an enormous cost on Argentina: first in human lives, with more than 18,000 men killed in the conflict, to which may be added the many thousands who died of cholera, including 15,000 in Buenos Aires Province alone. It also had a huge economic cost, as Argentina was forced to borrow until its debt reached 9,000,000 pounds sterling.

During the last year of the war, the Colegio Militar de la Nación was founded, with the Hungarian Juan F. Czetz as its first director. The possibility of conflict with Brazil arising from the postwar disputes led Sarmiento to modernize the navy: he founded the Naval School and incorporated several ships, thereby creating the first Argentine squadron capable of operating at a level comparable to the war fleets of Brazil and Chile.

=== The last federalist caudillos in the Litoral ===
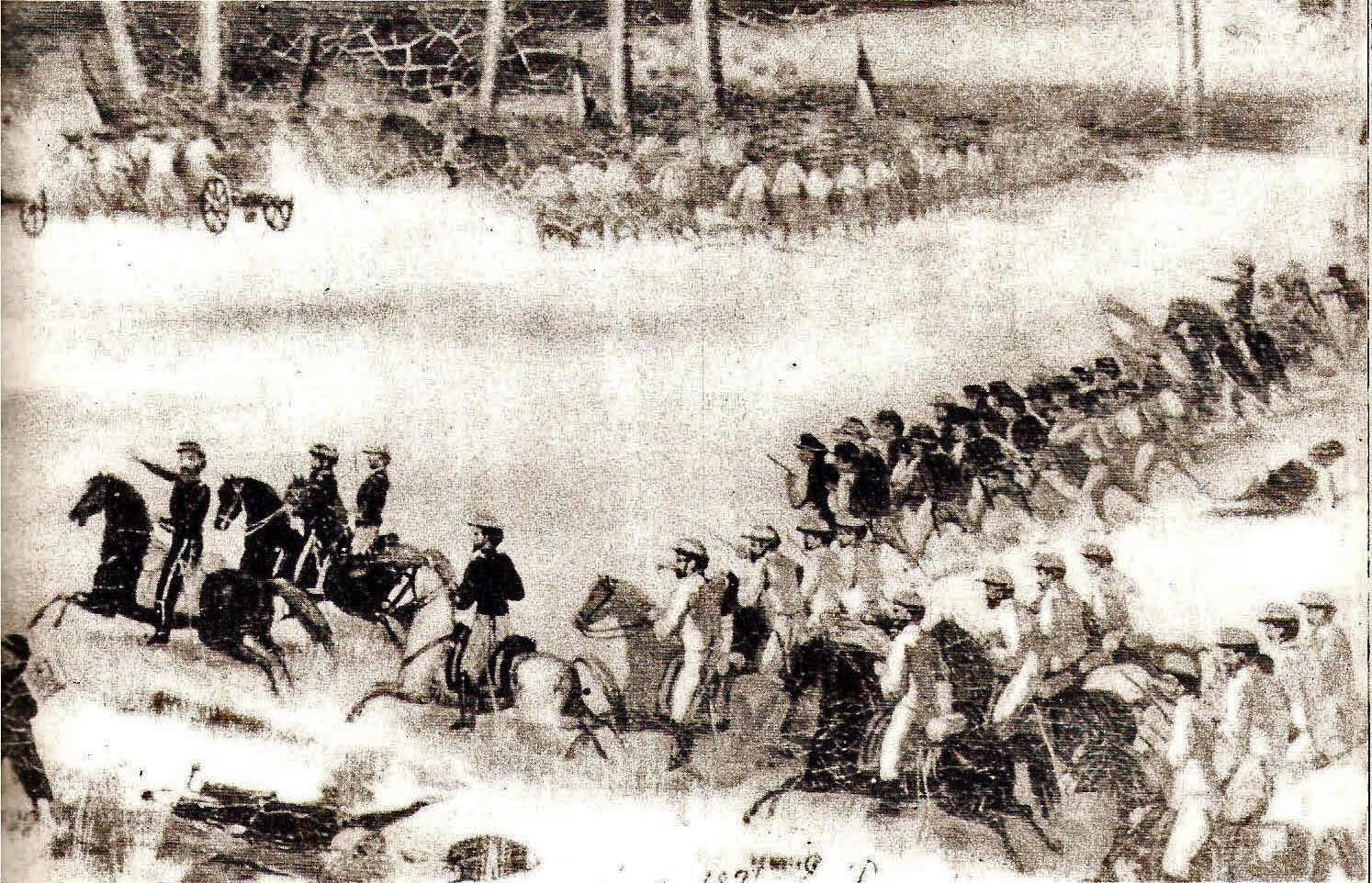
Battle of Ñaembé

After the defeat of Felipe Varela, three Argentine provinces were still in federalist hands: in Córdoba, military pressure forced Governor Luque to resign, and in Corrientes a liberal revolution overthrew the federalist governor in May 1868. A belated federalist response was crushed by troops of the national army transferred from the Paraguayan front in defense of a government that had emerged from a coup d'état.

Only Entre Ríos remained, where Urquiza coexisted peacefully with the national government against the wishes of many federalists: at the beginning of 1870 he had received the president at his residence in the Palacio San José and ordered that the corresponding honors be paid. Shortly after the end of the Paraguayan War, on 11 April 1870, General Ricardo López Jordán launched a revolution in which Urquiza was killed by the Cordoban Simón Luengo. López Jordán was elected governor by the legislature.

President Sarmiento sent to Entre Ríos an army made up of divisions veteran from the Paraguayan War. The governor forbade those troops from entering his province, but the president ridiculed the notion that the entry of national troops into a province could be prohibited. When the landing took place, López Jordán ordered the general mobilization of the province. Sarmiento declared war on Entre Ríos, although Congress did not authorize the federal intervention in that province until August.

Four armies advanced simultaneously into the province; the national troops—superior in arms and discipline—occupied the cities, forcing López Jordán to withdraw into the interior, where the men of Entre Ríos, mounted on better horses, held out to advantage. Seeking to open a new front, López Jordán invaded Corrientes Province, but on 26 January 1871 he was completely defeated in the Battle of Ñaembé; shortly afterward he fled to Brazil.

The Entre Ríos Federal Party was destroyed, and the federalists were removed from all public offices, including priests and schoolteachers.

In May 1873 López Jordán again rose in rebellion in his province, eventually commanding 16,000 men, well supplied with artillery and infantry. Sarmiento responded by placing a price on López Jordán's head—a measure rejected by Congress—and by decreeing the federal intervention of Entre Ríos. Three armies occupied the province under the overall command of the Minister of War, Martín de Gainza. Once again fighting spread throughout the province, and several Jordanist officers were shot; after a bloody defeat, López Jordán departed for Uruguay in December.

=== Population and public health ===
One of Domingo Faustino Sarmiento's first measures as president of Argentina was to organize the first national census, which was carried out in 1869; it produced a result of 1,836,490 inhabitants for the country. (Note: This figure included 6,276 members of the Army in Paraguayan territory. Naturally, it did not include the indigenous population not subject to the national authorities.) Of the total, 8% were European immigrants, 70% lived in rural areas, and 71% were illiterate.

During his presidency, immigration rose sharply with the arrival of 280,000 immigrants, who settled mainly in the city of Buenos Aires and, to a lesser extent, in agricultural colonies in the Litoral provinces.

The rapid growth of the population in the capital created large-scale problems of housing and hygiene: in 1871 a yellow fever epidemic—probably a consequence of the war—caused the deaths of around 14,000 people in Buenos Aires. The entire national government fled the city, so the fight against the plague had to be carried out by a commission. This body ordered the creation of the La Chacarita Cemetery and in the following years the city's first water-supply and sewerage networks were established.

=== Transport and communications ===
As president, one of his chief transportation goals was the construction of a trans-Andean railway linking the Atlantic and the Pacific. To this end, the construction of the branch line from Villa María (Córdoba) to Río Cuarto was encouraged; the branch from Córdoba to Tucumán was also built, as were two short branch lines, one between Concordia (Entre Ríos) and Mercedes (Corrientes), and the other between Buenos Aires and Campana. The railway network grew from 573 kilometers in 1868 to 1,331 in 1874. Since it was planned to extend the railway from Córdoba northward, he hired the German engineer José Enrique Rauch to design the route from Salta to the Pacific coast, which decades later would become the so-called Train to the Clouds.

During his presidency, about 5,000 km of telegraph lines were laid, promoted by the president and his minister, Vélez Sarsfield; in his 1873 message to Congress he was able to state that "the telegraph line has been completed and now runs through the whole Republic".

A number of ports were built, including those of Zárate and San Pedro (Buenos Aires). A modern port for Buenos Aires was planned, and the country went into debt for 30 million pesos to carry out the works, but that money was squandered on minor projects.

In 1873 the National Bank was created, which lent money at low interest or to insolvent debtors. The public debt—driven by the debt generated by the Paraguayan War—reached unsustainable levels, although the resulting economic crisis would not break out until the administration of his successor.

=== Foreign relations ===
During the first part of his administration, Foreign Minister Mariano Varela sought to pursue an almost idealistic policy regarding Paraguay's future: his well-known phrase "Victory does not confer rights" formed part of an attempt to limit the expansionist ambitions of Brazil. Brazil's response was to take advantage of that same policy by having the Paraguayan government protest against the Argentine occupation of Villa Occidental, opposite Asunción. When the Brazilian ambassador in Paraguay forced changes in the Paraguayan government, the president replaced Varela with Carlos Tejedor.

In 1872 Brazil signed a boundary treaty with Paraguay by which it awarded itself all the disputed territory, and then supported Paraguay in defending itself against Argentine claims. Tejedor then began an aggressive campaign to settle the disputes as quickly as possible, leading to growing tension with Brazil.

Relations with Chile centered on the dispute over the rights of the two countries in Patagonia. In 1874 it was decided that arbitration by the King of England would settle the disputes between them.

== Final years ==
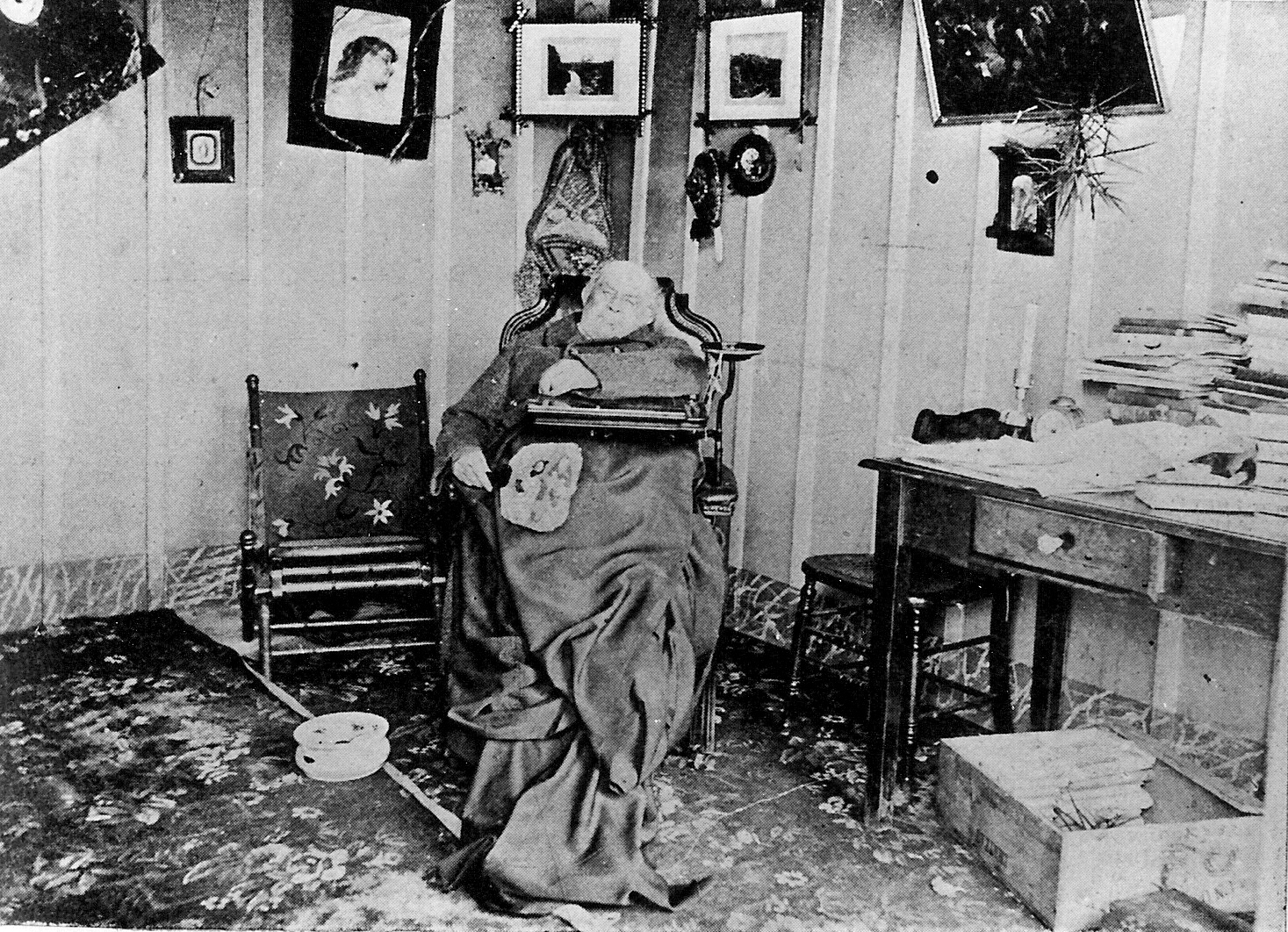
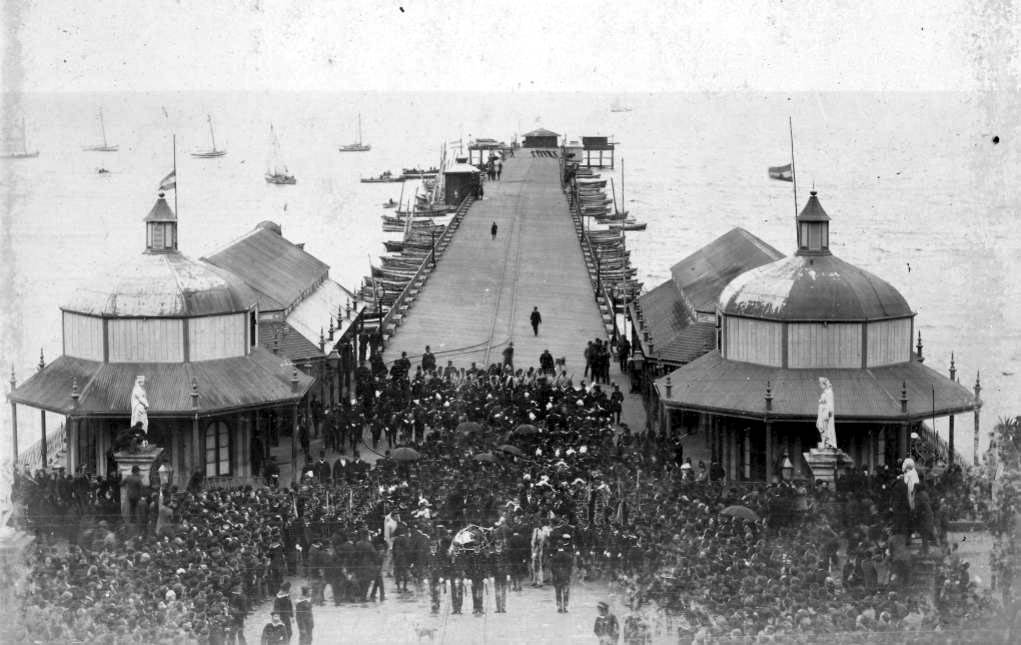
(Left): post mortem portrait of Sarmiento in Asunción, Paraguay, 11 September 1888; (right): The coffin with Sarmiento's body, arriving in Buenos Aires ten days after his death

In 1875, following his term as President, Sarmiento became the General Director of Schools for the Province of Buenos Aires. That same year, he became the Senator for San Juan, a post that he held until 1879, when he became Interior Minister. But he soon resigned, following conflict with the Governor of Buenos Aires, Carlos Tejedor. He then assumed the post of Superintendent General of Schools for the National Education Ministry under President Roca and published El Monitor de la Educación Común, which is a fundamental reference for Argentine education. In 1882, Sarmiento was successful in passing the sanction of Free Education allowing schools to be free, mandatory, and separate from that of religion.

In May 1888, Sarmiento left Argentina for Paraguay. He was accompanied by his daughter, Ana, and his companion Aurelia Vélez. He died in Asunción on 11 September 1888, from a heart attack, and was buried in Buenos Aires, after a ten-day trip. His tomb at La Recoleta Cemetery lies under a sculpture, a condor upon a pylon, designed by himself and executed by Victor de Pol. Pedro II, the Emperor of Brazil and a great admirer of Sarmiento, sent to his funeral procession a green and gold crown of flowers with a message written in Spanish remembering the highlights of his life: "Civilization and Barbarism, Tonelero, Monte Caseros, Petrópolis, Public Education. Remembrance and Homage from Pedro de Alcântara."

== Philosophy ==
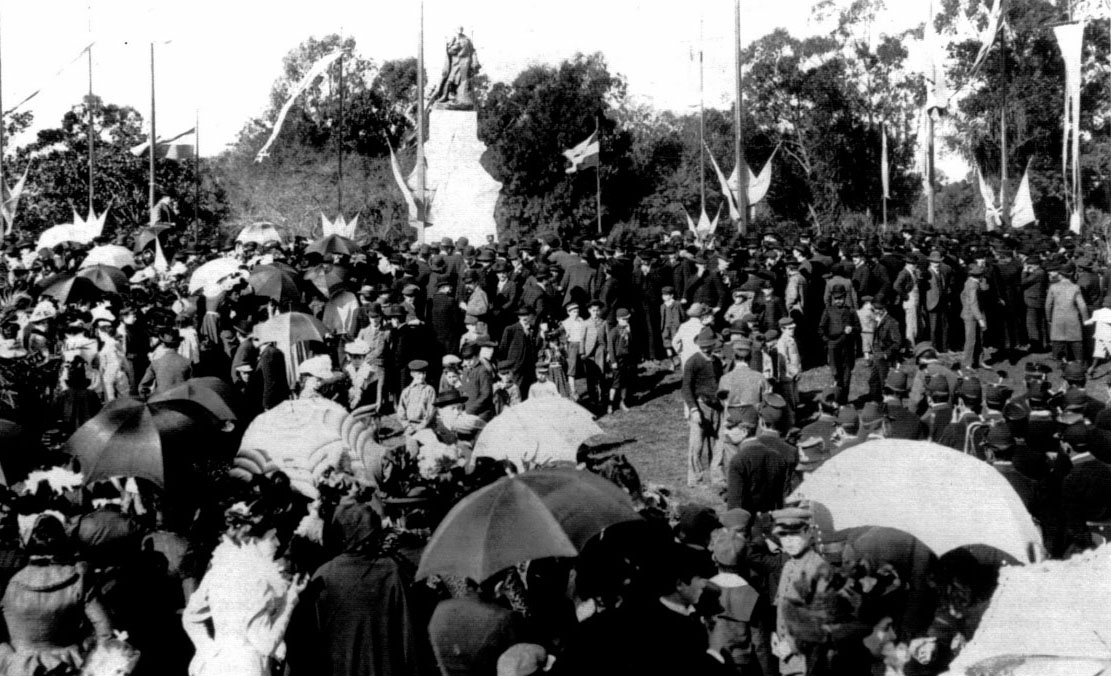
The statue of Sarmiento made by Auguste Rodin, when being unveiled in 1900

Sarmiento was well known for his modernization of the country, and for his improvements to the educational system. He firmly believed in democracy and European liberalism, but was most often seen as a romantic. Sarmiento was well versed in Western philosophy including the works of Karl Marx and John Stuart Mill. He was particularly fascinated with the liberty given to those living in the United States, which he witnessed as a representative of the Peruvian government. He did, however, see pitfalls to liberty, pointing for example to the aftermath of the French Revolution, which he compared to Argentina's own May Revolution. He believed that liberty could turn into anarchy and thus civil war, which is what happened in France and in Argentina. Therefore, his use of the term "liberty" was more in reference to a laissez-faire approach to the economy, and religious liberty. Though a Catholic himself, he began to adopt the ideas of separation of church and state modeled after the US. He believed that there should be more religious freedom, and less religious affiliation in schools. This was one of many ways in which Sarmiento tried to connect South America to North America.

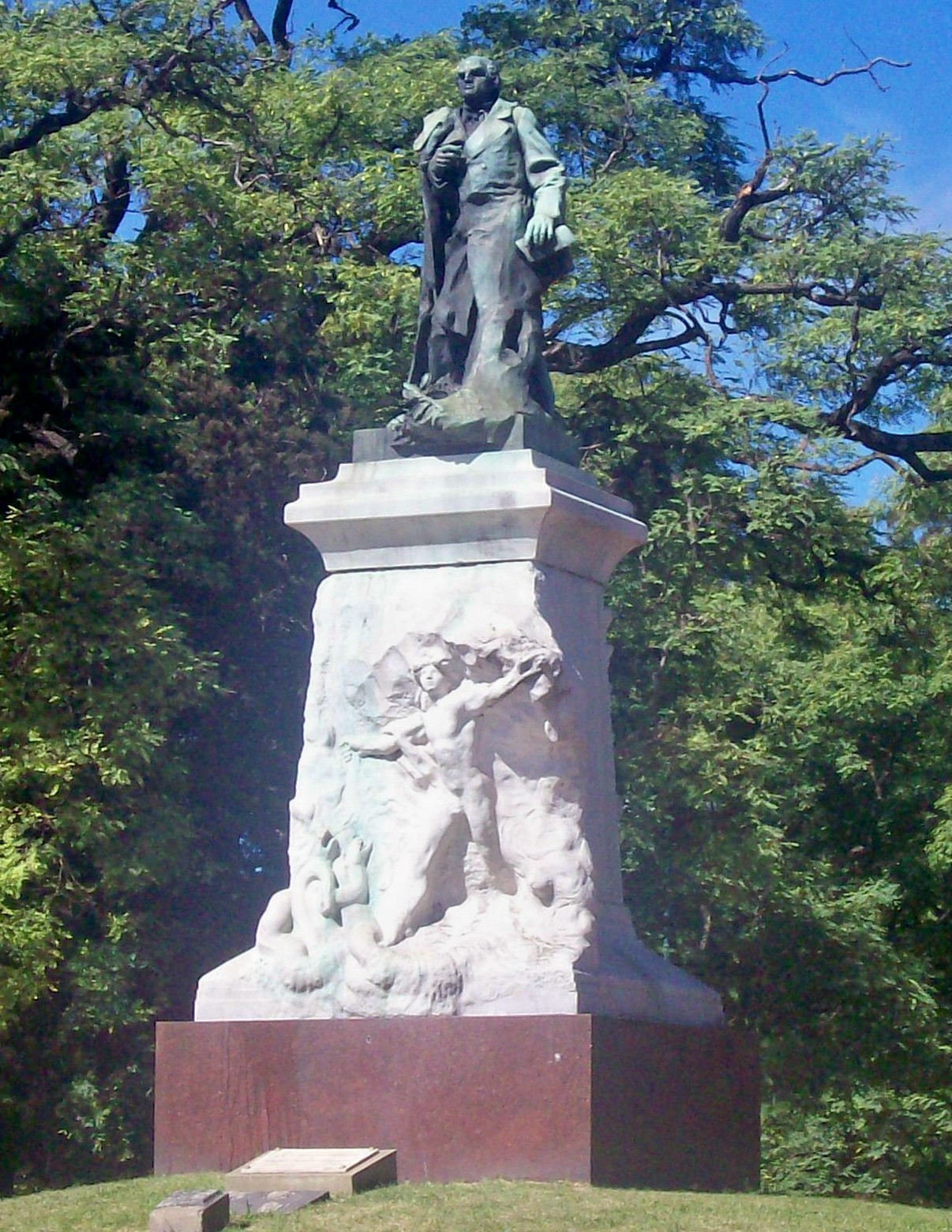
Statue of Sarmiento photographed in 2009

Sarmiento believed that the material and social needs of people had to be satisfied but not at the cost of order and decorum. He put great importance on law and citizen participation. These ideas he most equated to Rome and to the United States, a society which he viewed as exhibiting similar qualities. In order to civilize the Argentine society and make it equal to that of Rome or the United States, Sarmiento believed in eliminating the caudillos, or the larger landholdings and establishing multiple agricultural colonies run by European immigrants.

Coming from a family of writers, orators, and clerics, Domingo Sarmiento placed a great value on education and learning. He opened a number of schools including the first school in Latin America for teachers in Santiago in 1842: La Escuela Normal Preceptores de Chile. He proceeded to open 18 more schools and had mostly female teachers from the United States come to Argentina to instruct graduates how to be effective when teaching. Sarmiento's belief was that education was the key to happiness and success, and that a nation could not be democratic if it was not educated. "We must educate our rulers," he said. "An ignorant people will always choose Rosas.". His views on the South American Indians have been more controversial, with some scholars arguing Sarmiento's views reflected the racism of his day. For example, in the periodical El Nacional, dated 25 November 1857, Sarmiento wrote: “Will we be able to exterminate the Indians? For the savages of America, I feel an invincible repugnance that I cannot cure. Those scoundrels are not anything more than disgusting Indians that I would hang if they reappeared. Lautaro and Caupolicán are dirty Indians, because that's how they are all. Incapable of progress, their extermination is providential and useful, sublime and great. They must be exterminated without even sparing the little one, who already has the instinctive hatred for the civilized man.”

== Publications ==
=== Major works ===
- Facundo – Civilización y Barbarie – Vida de Juan Facundo Quiroga, 1845. Written during his long exile in Chile. Originally published in 1845 in Chile in installments in El Progreso newspaper, Facundo is Sarmiento's most famous work. It was first published in book form in 1851, and the first English translation, by Mary Mann, appeared in 1868. A recent modern edition in English was translated by Kathleen Ross. Facundo promotes further civilization and European influence on Argentine culture through the use of anecdotes and references to Juan Facundo Quiroga, Argentine caudillo general. As well as being a call to progress, Sarmiento discusses the nature of Argentine peoples as well as including his thoughts and objections to Juan Manuel de Rosas, governor of Buenos Aires from 1829 to 1832 and again from 1835, due to the turmoil generated by Facundo's death, to 1852. As literary critic Sylvia Molloy observes, Sarmiento claimed that this book helped explain Argentine struggles to European readers, and was cited in European publications. Written with extensive assistance from others, Sarmiento adds to his own memory the quotes, accounts, and dossiers from other historians and companions of Facundo Quiroga. Facundo maintains its relevance in modern-day as well, bringing attention to the contrast of lifestyles in Latin America, the conflict and struggle for progress while maintaining tradition, as well as the moral and ethical treatment of the public by government officials and regimes. Sarmiento sought to understand why the two sides in Argentina fought ongoing civil wars. The book contrasts the rural world, where the Indian and gaucho were central, with the urban world of Buenos Aires, seen as an enlightened cultural model. Sarmiento explored the tensions between these two worlds in shaping the nation. He argued that Argentina’s scientific and industrial backwardness mirrored Spain’s, both due to a lingering attachment to medievalism. At the core of this backwardness was the dominance of Catholic dogmas. Sarmiento’s analysis examined how these factors contributed to the social and political crises of his time.
- Recuerdos de Provincia (Recollections of a Provincial Past), 1850. In this second autobiography, Sarmiento displays a stronger effort to include familial links and ties to his past, in contrast to Mi defensa, choosing to relate himself to San Juan and his Argentine heritage. Sarmiento discusses growing up in rural Argentina with basic ideologies and simple livings. Similar to Facundo, Sarmiento uses previous dossiers filed against himself by enemies to assist in writing Recuerdos and therefore fabricating an autobiography based on these files and from his own memory. Sarmiento's persuasion in this book is substantial. The accounts, whether all true or false against him, are a source of information to write Recuerdos as he is then able to object and rectify into what he creates as a 'true account' of autobiography.

=== Other works ===
Sarmiento was a prolific author. The following is a selection of his other works:

- Mi defensa, 1843. This was Sarmiento's first autobiography in a pamphlet form, which omits any substantial information or recognition of his illegitimate daughter Ana. This would have discredited Sarmiento as a respected father of Argentina, as Sarmiento portrays himself as a sole individual, disregarding or denouncing important ties to other people and groups in his life.
- Viajes por Europa, África, y América 1849. A description and observations while travelling as a representative of the Chilean government to learn more about educational systems around the world.
- Argirópolis 1850. A description of a future utopian city in the River Plate States.
- Comentarios sobre la constitución 1852. This is Sarmiento's official account of his ideologies promoting civilization and the "Europeanization" and "Americanization" of Argentina. This account includes dossiers, articles, speeches and information regarding the pending constitution.
- Informes sobre educación, 1856. This report was the first official statistic report on education in Latin America includes information on gender and location distribution of pupils, salaries and wages, and comparative achievement. Informes sobre educación proposes new theories, plans, and methods of education as well as quality controls on schools and learning systems.
- Las Escuelas, base de la prosperidad y de la republica en los Estados Unidos 1864. This work, along with the previous two, were intended to persuade Latin America and Argentines of the benefits of the educational, economic and political systems of the United States, which Sarmiento supported.
- Conflicto y armonías de las razas en América 1883, deals with race issues in Latin America in the late 1800s. While situations in the book remain particular to the time period and location, race issues and conflicts of races are still prevalent and enable the book to be relevant in the present day.
- Vida de Dominguito, 1886. A memoir of Dominguito, Sarmiento's adopted son who was the only child Sarmiento had always accepted. Many of the notes used to compile Vida de Dominguito had been written 20 years prior during one of Sarmiento's stays in Washington.
- Educar al soberano, a compilation of letters written from 1870 to 1886 on the topic of improved education, promoting and suggesting new reforms such as secondary schools, parks, sporting fields and specialty schools. This compilation was met with far greater success than Ortografía, Instrucción Publica and received greater public support.
- El camino de Lacio, which impacted Argentina by influencing many Italians to immigrate by relating Argentinas history to that of Latium of the Roman empire.
- Inmigración y colonización, a publication which led to mass immigration of Europeans to mostly urban Argentina, which Sarmiento believed would assist in 'civilizing' the country over the more barbaric gauchos and rural provinces. This had a large impact on Argentine politics, especially as much of the civil tension in the country was divided between the rural provinces and the cities. In addition to increased urban population, these European immigrants had a cultural effect upon Argentina, providing what Sarmiento believed to be more civilized culture similar to North America's.
- On the Condition of Foreigners, which helped to assist political changes for immigrants in 1860.
- Ortografía, Instrucción Publica, an example of Sarmiento's passion for improved education. Sarmiento focused on illiteracy of the youth, and suggested simplifying reading and spelling for the public education system, a method which was never implemented.
- Práctica Constitucional, a three volume work, describing current political methods as well as propositions for new methodologies.
- Presidential Papers, a history of his presidency, formed of many personal and external documents.
- Travels in the United States in 1847 (edited and translated into English by Michael Aaron Rockland).

== Legacy ==
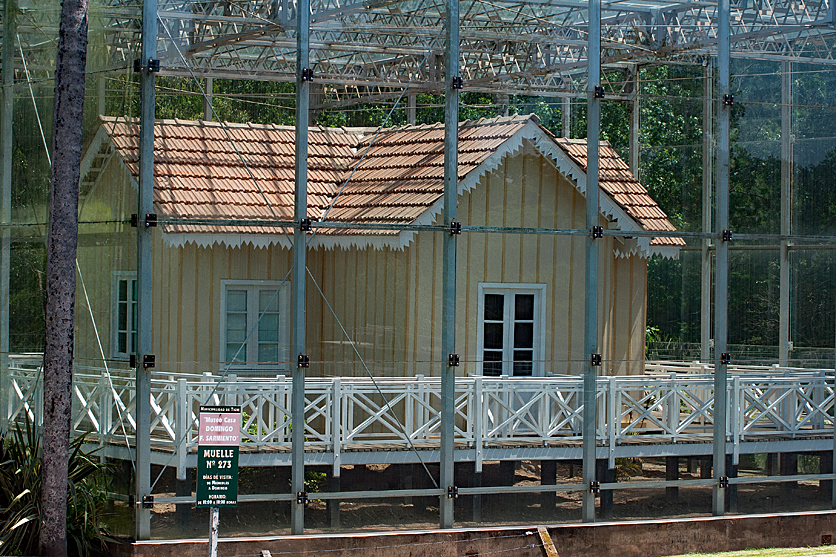
Sarmiento's house on the Parana delta

The impact of Domingo Faustino Sarmiento is most obviously seen in the establishment of 11 September as Panamerican Teacher's Day which was done in his honor at the 1943 Interamerican Conference on Education, held in Panama. Today, he is still considered to be Latin America's teacher. In his time, he opened countless schools, created free public libraries, opened immigration, and worked towards a Union of Plate States.

His impact was not only on the world of education, but also on Argentine political and social structure. His ideas are now revered as innovative, though at the time they were not widely accepted. He was a self-made man and believed in sociological and economic growth for Latin America, something that the Argentine people could not recognize at the time with the soaring standard of living which came with high prices, high wages, and an increased national debt.

There is a building named in his honor at the Argentine embassy in Washington D.C.

Today, there is a statue in honor of Sarmiento in Boston on the Commonwealth Avenue Mall, between Gloucester and Hereford streets, erected in 1973. There is a square, Plaza Sarmiento in Rosario, Argentina. One of Rodin's last sculptures was that of Sarmiento which is now in Buenos Aires.

== Footnotes ==
Political offices
Preceded by Francisco Domingo Díaz	Governor of San Juan; 1862–1864	Succeeded by Santiago Lloveras
Preceded by Bartolomé Mitre	President of Argentina; 1868–1874	Succeeded by Nicolás Avellaneda
Preceded by Bernardo de Irigoyen	Minister of the Interior; 1879	Succeeded by Benjamín Zorrilla
Preceded by Manuel Montes de Oca	Minister of Foreign Affairs and Worship; 1879	Succeeded by Lucas González
