= List of wars involving Uruguay =

This is a list of wars involving the Oriental Republic of Uruguay from 1825 to the present.

Conflict	Combatant 1	Combatant 2	Results	Notable battles
Siege of Colonia del Sacramento (1704 - War of the Spanish Succession)	Buenos Aires	Kingdom of Spain	Victory: Spanish forces of the Portuguese colonial abandoned Colonia del Sacramento	
Anglo-Spanish War (1796 –1808)	Spain	United Kingdom	Spanish victory	Battle of Cardal (1807); Battle of Montevideo (1807)
Second Banda Oriental campaign (1812-1814)	Spanish Empire	United Provinces of the Río de la Plata	United Provinces of the Río de la Plata victory	Battle of Las Piedras (1811); Siege of Montevideo (1811); Siege of Montevideo (1812–1814); Battle of Cerrito (1812); Battle of Buceo (1814)
Portuguese conquest of the Banda Oriental (1816–1820)	United Kingdom of Portugal, Brazil and the Algarves	Federal League	Luso-Brazilian victory	Battle of India Muerta (1816); Battle of Sauce (1816); Battle of Arapey (1817); Battle of Catalán (1817); Battle of Paso Cuello (1817); Battle of Arroyo Grande (1818); Battle of Tacuarembó (1820)
Cisplatine War (1825–1828)	Río de la Plata; Thirty-Three Orientals	Brazil	Stalemate: Independence of the Republic of Uruguay	Battle of Sarandí (1825); Battle of Colonia del Sacramento (1826); Battle of Juncal (1827)
Uruguayan Civil War (1839–1852)	Colorados; Unitarians; Brazil; Entre Ríos; Corrientes; France; United Kingdom	Blancos; Argentina; Federalists	Colorado victory: Imposition of the Colorados in Uruguay	Great Siege of Montevideo (1843 – 1851)
Platine War (1845–1852)	Brazil; Uruguay; Paraguay (Argentina) Argentine Rebels	Argentina	Victory: Argentine clout over the Platine region ends; Brazilian hegemony in the Platine region	
Uruguayan War (1864–1865)	Uruguay; Blancos; Federalists	Brazil; Colorados; Unitarians; Argentina	Defeat: Colorados takeover, regime change in Uruguay	
Paraguayan War (1864–1870)	Brazil; Argentina; Uruguay	Paraguay	Victory: Allied occupation of Paraguay	
Revolution of the Lances (1870–1872)	Colorados	Blancos	Blanco victory: Agreement of power-sharing reached	
Revolution of 1904 (1904)	Colorados	Blancos	Colorado victory: Death of Aparicio Saravia; Blanco revolutionaries stop fighting	
World War II (1945)	United States; Soviet Union; United Kingdom; China; France; Poland; Canada; Australia; New Zealand; India; South Africa; Yugoslavia; Greece; Denmark; Norway; Netherlands; Belgium; Luxembourg; Czechoslovakia; Brazil; Mexico; Chile; Bolivia; Colombia; Ecuador; Paraguay; Peru; Venezuela; Uruguay; Argentina	GermanyJapan; Italy; Hungary; Romania; Bulgaria; Croatia; Slovakia; Finland; Thailand; Manchukuo; Mengjiang	Victory: Collapse of the German Reich; Fall of Japanese and Italian Empires; Creation of the United Nations; Emergence of the United States and the Soviet Union as superpowers; Beginning of the Cold War	
Internal War in Uruguay (1963-1974)	Uruguay	MLN-T; OPR-33; MRO	Victory: The Civic-military dictatorship succeeds in arresting all guerrillas.	

== Bibliography ==
- Halperín Donghi, Tulio (2007). The Contemporary History of Latin America. Durham: Duke University Press. ISBN 978-08-2231-374-8.
