= Battle of São Borja (1816) =

1816 battle of the Portuguese conquest of the Banda Oriental

- Part of the Portuguese conquest of the Banda Oriental
- Portuguese plan of the battle
Date	3 October 1816
Location	Near São Borja, Brazil 28°39′24″S 55°59′41″W
Result	Luso-Brazilian victory

Belligerents
United Kingdom	Misiones

Commanders and leaders
Francisco das Chagas Santos; José de Abreu	Andrés Guazurary

Strength
1,200 men	1,500 men

Casualties and losses
	500 dead or captured

The Battle of São Borja was an engagement which took place in 3 October 1816 during the Portuguese conquest of the Banda Oriental, where forces from Misiones allied to Artigas attempted to attack Portuguese positions in the Misiones Orientales, but were ultimately defeated.

== Background ==
After Portuguese forces invaded Uruguay in 1816, independist leader José Gervasio Artigas put into place a plan to destroy them, holding them in multiple weak points with his irregulars and then finally advancing in the north to cut them off from the rest of Brazil. To this end, it would be necessary to push the Portuguese out of the Misiones Orientales to the northwest, a task which was given to Andrés Guazurary's troops; Andrés was the caudillo of the Federal province of Misiones, and the adopted son of Artigas.

After they'd crossed the Uruguay River in 12 September 1816, Guazurary's 1,500 badly armed men marched towards the key reduction of São Francisco Borja (located in modern day São Borja), the Portuguese headquarters in the region, wiping out two small Portuguese garrisons on the way. After they reached it in 21 September, they laid siege, and, a week later, tried to assault it, but were pushed back by the 400 defenders, who were manning 14 guns, versus a single gun for the attackers. The siege remained in place.

A messenger was sent by the Portuguese towards José de Abreu, whose forces were operating in the region and had only recently defeated another Artigas ally, Pantaleón Sotelo. To reach São Borja, his forces had to cross the Ibicuí River while carrying heavy artillery pieces and fighting off enemy patrols.

== Engagement and aftermath ==
On 3 October, just as Guazurary ordered another assault, Abreu's 800 men arrived, putting the army of Misiones into a crossfire. The surprised Guazurary ordered his cavalry, equipped mostly with lances, into repeated charges against the Portuguese reinforcements, but when the latter managed to get one of their guns into action their opponents were thrown in disarray. Guazurary had participated in the charges and lost his sword in one of them (he would later reportedly state that only after a victory he would again grant himself the right to wield a sword in battle). The ensuing pursuit caused further casualties amongst them, and they had to withdraw to the other side of the Uruguay River.

This gave the Portuguese the freedom of action to mass troops to defeat José Antonio Berdún and Artigas' troops in isolation at the Battles of Ibiraocaí and Carumbé respectively. Artigas' plan had been foiled, and the caudillo had to withdraw from northern Uruguay entirely.
