= Battle of Paso Cuello =

1817 battle of the Portuguese conquest of the Banda Oriental

- Part of the Portuguese conquest of the Banda Oriental
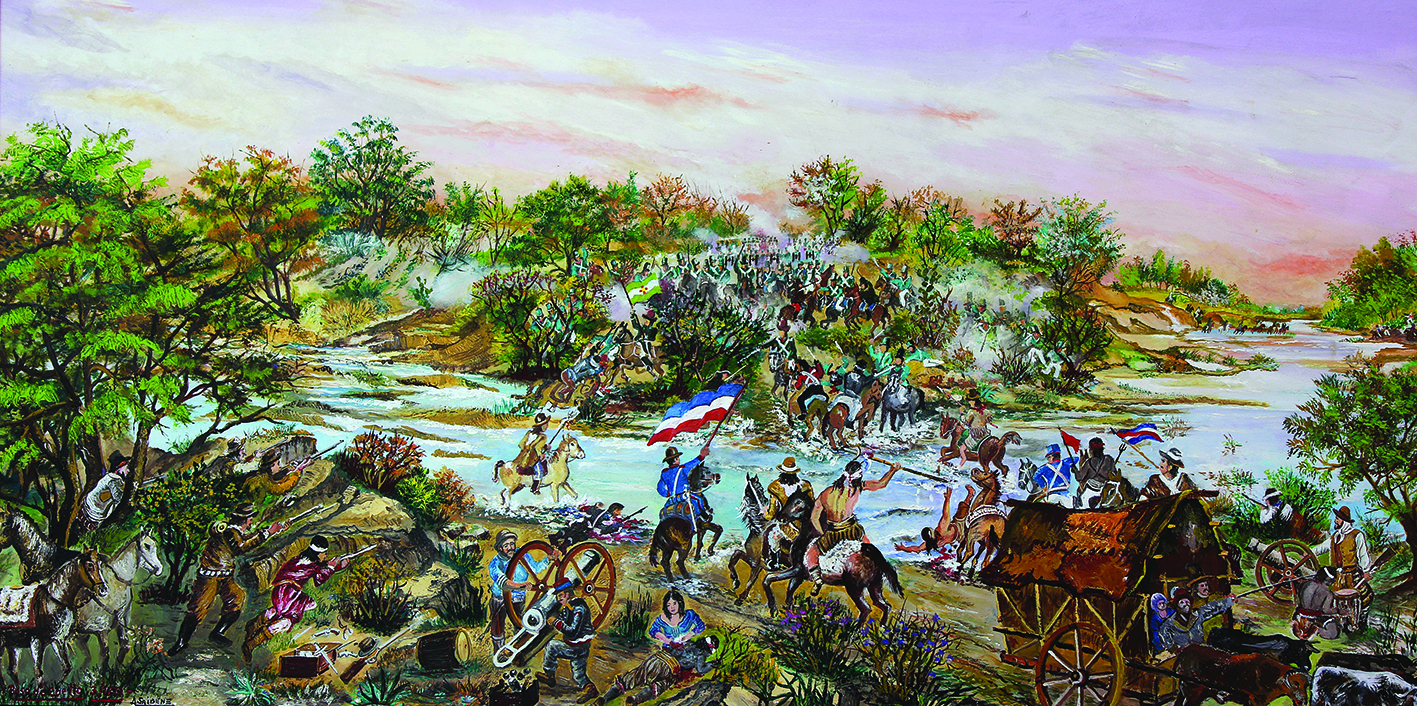
Date	19 March 1817
Location	Paso Cuello, border region between Canelones and Florida, Banda Oriental (modern-day Uruguay) 34°23′18″S 56°11′18″W
Result	Inconclusive

Belligerents
United Kingdom of Portugal, Brazil and the Algarves	Federal League

Commanders and leaders
Carlos F. Lecor	Miguel Barreiro; Fructuoso Rivera

Strength
Uruguayan sources: 1,700; 5 cannons	Uruguayan sources: 400–1,300; 1–2 cannons Lecor's report: 1,400–1,500; 4 cannons

Casualties and losses
Uruguayan sources: 50 killed and wounded	Uruguayan sources: 100 killed and wounded Lecor's report: 50–60 killed 40 captured

The Battle of Paso Cuello took place on 19 March 1817 between forces commanded by Carlos Frederico Lecor, at that time Baron of Laguna, and artiguist forces, (Note: Also referred to as "orientals", from the Spanish demonym orientales, in reference to the inhabitants of the Banda Oriental.) that is, followers of the caudillo José Gervasio Artigas, led by Fructuoso Rivera and Miguel Barreiro at Paso Cuello, a small stream that divides the modern day Uruguayan departments of Canelones and Florida.

Lecor, that had already taken Montevideo by that time, left the city a few days earlier with his forces to attack the oriental encampment at Paso Cuello, where he believed Artigas had made his base.
