= Battle of Pablo Perez =

- Part of Portuguese conquest of the Banda Oriental
| Date | 6 December 1816 |
| Location | Cerro Largo, Uruguay |
| Result | Federal League victory |

Belligerents
| United Kingdom of Portugal, Brazil and the Algarves | Federal League |

Commanders and leaders
| Bernardo da Silveira | Fernando Otorgués |

Strength
| 2,000 men | Unknown |

Casualties and losses
| 40 killed | 9 killed, 14 wounded |

The Battle of Pablo Perez was an encounter between the Luso-Brazilian forces under the command of Bernardo da Silveira and the Artiguist forces of Fernando Otorgués in Cerro Largo, modern-day Uruguay. The encounter ended with a victory for the Federal League.

== Prelude ==
The Luso-Brazilian invasion plan for the Banda Oriental (present-day Uruguay) called for the army to be divided into three separate columns.
The largest, led by Carlos Federico Lecor, was to advance along the Atlantic coast, while General Joaquim Xavier Curado's column was to remain north of the Río Negro.
The third column, entrusted to Field Mariscal de Campo Bernardo da Silveira, was to move between the other two, primarily responsible for protecting the right flank of the main division. Silveira's initial objective, the city of Paysandú, was changed by Lecor, who ordered the column to march on Montevideo.

Silveira invaded the Banda Oriental territory, but soon encountered difficulties due to a lack of horses. On 9 November 1816, he crossed the Yaguarón River and invaded the territory of Cerro Largo, where he was met by the League commander Fernando Otorgués, who had deployed patrols in the area. An initial skirmish between reconnaissance patrols resulted in a Luso-Brazilian victory and the capture of fourteen prisoners.

Intending to locate the enemy, Silveira assembled an advance force consisting of two companies of Portuguese cavalry, half a squadron of Rio Grande militia, and other irregular fighters, placing it under the command of Lieutenant Colonel Manuel Antonio Recanha.

== The Battle ==
On 6 December 1816, the Luso-Brazilian vanguard encountered and attacked Fernando Otorgués, who, outnumbered, retreated to the Pablo Pérez stream. There, the Uruguayan commander, observing the exhaustion of the enemy's horses and the distance between the vanguard and the main body of the column, turned his troops around and personally led the attack.

The engagement left forty dead in the Luso-Brazilian ranks. The Uruguayan troops suffered fourteen wounded and nine dead.

== Aftermath ==
After the defeat, Silveira retreated to the pastures of Casupá, where he remained for about ten days, convinced that the position provided him with a good strategic advantage. At the same time, he attempted to contact the main column of the Luso-Brazilian army. Otorgués's troops were joined by those of Fructuoso Rivera, and together they marched against Silveira's column. However, disagreements between the two League commanders, caused the plan to force the enemy into a decisive battle to fail. Otorgués retreated towards the Yí River, while Rivera sent his vanguard, led by Juan Antonio Lavalleja, to carry out continuous acts of harassment against the Luso-Brazilians.

On 4 January 1817, Silveira, who had abandoned his post after being unable to contact Lecor, entered Minas, where he remained for eight days, surrounded by Rivera's troops. In the middle of the month, he managed to reach Pan de Azúcar, where he joined Lecor's column to launch an attack on Montevideo.

== Sources ==
- Alonso Rodríguez, Edison (1954). Artigas: Aspectos Militares del Héroe. Montevideo: Centro Militar. República Oriental del Uruguay. OCLC 1123973740.
- Capilla de Castellanos, Aurora; Ardao, María Julia (1991). El Escenario Geográfico del artiguismo. Montevideo: A. Monteverde & Cía. OCLC 37415834.
- Zorrilla de San Martín, Juan (1910). La Epopeya de Artigas. Tomo II. Montevideo: Barreiro y Ramos. OCLC 1186983343.
