= Battle of Santa Ana (1816) =

- Part of the Portuguese conquest of the Banda Oriental
Date	22 September 1816
Location	Rio Grande do Sul, Brazil
Result	Federal League victory

Belligerents
United Kingdom of Portugal, Brazil and the Algarves	Federal League

Commanders and leaders
Alexandre Queirós	General Sotelo

Strength
Unknown	Unknown

Casualties and losses
Up to 100 men killed	Unknown

The Battle of Santa Ana took place on 22 September 1816 in Rio Grande do Sul, modern-day Brazil. The battle was between a detachment of Luso-Brazilian forces from the army of General Curado and part of the army of José Gervasio Artigas of the Federal League. The Luso-Brazilians were initially victorious but eventually forced to retreat due to a lack of ammunition and were pursued closely, suffering heavy casualties of up to 100 dead.

The Luso-Brazilians were under the command of Alexandre Queirós.

After the Luso-Brazilian attack, oriental (Note: Demonym of the inhabitants of the Banda Oriental, from Spanish orientales.) leader José Gervasio Artigas attempted to take the battle to the invading forces by invading Brazil. The battle lasted for 3 hours and ended with a Luso-Brazilian defeat.
