= Battle of Arroyo Grande (1818) =

- Part of the Portuguese conquest of the Banda Oriental
Date	28 October 1818
Location	Arroyo Grande, Uruguay
Result	Luso-Brazilian victory

Belligerents
United Kingdom of Portugal, Brazil and the Algarves	Federal League

Commanders and leaders
Bento Manuel Ribeiro	Fructuoso Rivera

Strength
4,000	Unknown

Casualties and losses
Unknown	~100

The Battle of Arroyo Grande took place between the Luso-Brazilian forces under the command of Bento Manuel Ribeiro, and the Artiguist forces of Fructuoso Rivera in Arroyo Grande, modern-day Uruguay. The Luso-Brazilian forces were completely victorious.

== Consequences ==
After the Luso-Brazilian success in Arroyo Grande, a great number of Artiguist soldiers and officers defected and joined them, due to the fact they were promised forgiveness and mercy. This, together with the battle itself, was a severe blow to Artigas' war effort.
The battle was the last action of General Curado's military campaign in the Banda Oriental. On 22 January 1820, Artigas was definitively defeated in the Battle of Tacuarembó. Two months after this episode, Rivera abandoned the fight, signing a ceasefire agreement with the Portuguese-Brazilians at Tres Arboles.
