= Battle of Apóstoles =

- Part of the Portuguese conquest of the Banda Oriental
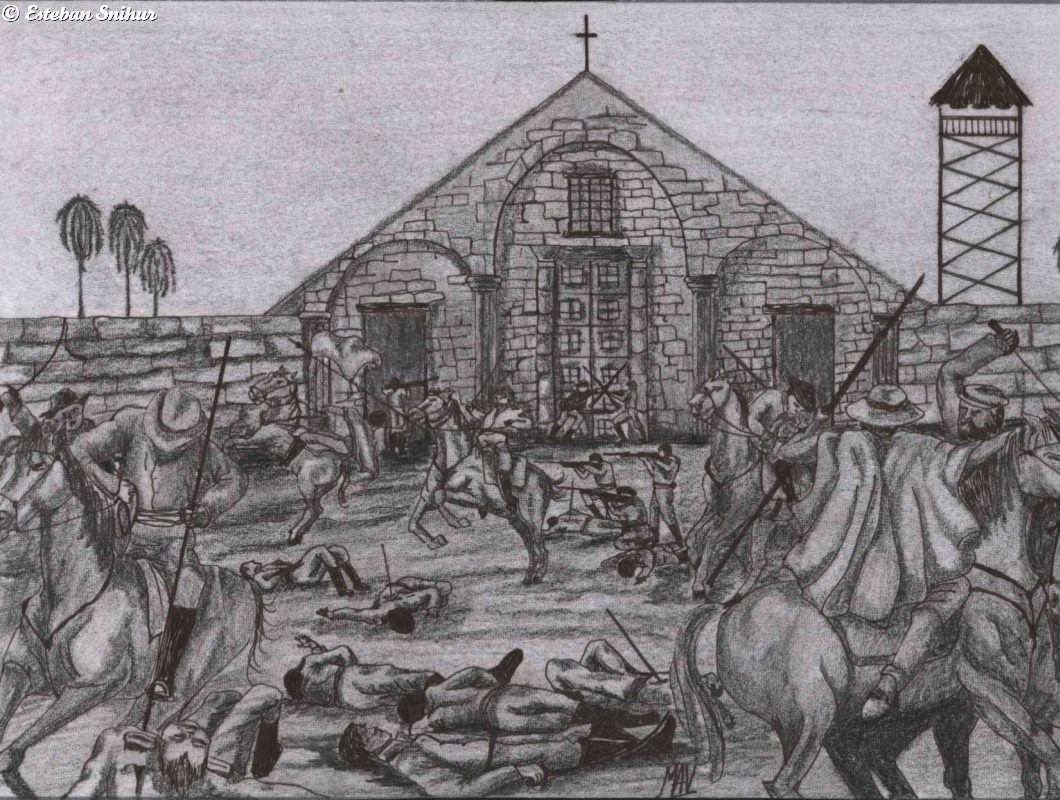
- Sketch of the battle, unknown artist.
Date	2 July 1817
Location	Apóstoles, Misiones, Federal League, United Provinces of the Río de la Plata
Result	Misiones victory

Belligerents
United Kingdom of Portugal, Brazil and the Algarves	Misiones

Commanders and leaders
Francisco das Chagas Santos	Andrés Guazurary

Strength
600 men 2 artillery pieces	500 men

Casualties and losses
Unknown	84 men killed

The Battle of Apóstoles was an encounter between the Luso-Brazilian forces under Francisco das Chagas Santos and the Artiguist forces led by Andrés Guazurary, popularly known as Andresito, in Apóstoles.

Brazilian general Chagas Santos had attacked the territory of the Misiones, conquering and destroying many villages. He then turned to the Headquarters of Andresito, Apósteles. The artiguist commander awaited him, inflicting heavy losses on the Portuguese and forcing them to retreat.

== Composition of Andresito's Troops ==
Most of the men who fought alongside Andresito in Apósteles were survivors of the many attacks made by the Luso-Brazilians in San Carlos, San José, Concepción, Santo Tomé, La Cruz, Mártires, San Javier and many other towns and villages in Misiones.
