= Battle of Ibicuí River (1817) =

- Part of the Portuguese conquest of the Banda Oriental
Date	1817
Location	Ibicuí River, modern-day Brazil
Result	Luso-Brazilian victory

Belligerents
United Kingdom of Portugal, Brazil and the Algarves	Federal League

Commanders and leaders
Francisco das Chagas Santos	General Sotelo

Strength
650 men	2,500 men

Casualties and losses
2 men killed	400 men killed 2,000 horses captured

The Battle of Ibicuí River took place between the Luso-Brazilian forces under Brigadier Francisco das Chagas Santos and the Federal League forces under the command of General Sotelo. The Luso-Brazilians were victorious and inflicted very high casualties on Sotelo's army.

General José de Abreu had secured the left bank of the Uruguay River as far south as its junction with the Ibicuí River where Santos had command of 650–700 men. Federal League forces under General Sotelo travelled from Yapeyú upstream and landed near the junction of the two rivers on 20 September. Luso-Brazilian forces attacked these troops on 21 and 23 September. After their artillery drove off the protecting squadron of boats Sotelo withdrew.
