= Battle of San Carlos =

Battle of San Carlos may refer to

- Battle of San Carlos (1813), near Chillán during the Chilean war of independence
- Battle of San Carlos (1817), in modern Argentina
- Battle of San Carlos (1982), in San Carlos Water during the Falklands war
