= Tacuarembó (disambiguation) =

Tacuarembó is a toponym of Guaraní origin, meaning "river of the reeds". It may refer to:

- Tacuarembó, a city in Uruguay
- Tacuarembó Department, a political division of Uruguay
- Tacuarembó River, a watercourse in Uruguay
- Roman Catholic Diocese of Tacuarembó, Uruguay
- Tacuarembó Fútbol Club, a Uruguayan soccer club based in Tacuarembó
- Battle of Tacuarembó (1820), an episode of the Portuguese conquest of the Banda Oriental
