= Battle of Catalán =

1817 battle of the Portuguese conquest of the Banda Oriental

- Part of the Portuguese conquest of the Banda Oriental
- Portuguese plan of the battle made by Captain J. de O. Paes Lemos (the north is to the right)
Date	4 January 1817
Location	Arroyo Catalán, Banda Oriental (present-day Uruguay) 30°45′44″S 56°14′34″W
Result	Luso-Brazilian victory

Belligerents
United Kingdom of Portugal, Brazil and the Algarves	Federal League

Commanders and leaders
(Portugal) Marquis of Alegrete; (Portugal) Joaquim X. Curado	Andrés Latorre

Strength
2,500; 11 cannons	3,400; 2 cannons

Casualties and losses
243: 79 killed 164 wounded	1,190: 900 killed 290 captured 2 cannons

The Battle of Catalán was fought between the Luso-Brazilian forces under the command of Luís Teles da Silva Caminha e Meneses, the Marquis of Alegrete, and the artiguistas commanded by Andrés Latorre in Arroyo Catalán, present-day Artigas Department, Uruguay.

The troops under the command of the Marquis of Alegrete and Joaquim Xavier Curado consisted of 1,200 soldiers of infantry, cavalry and artillery of the São Paulo Legion (Portuguese: Legião de São Paulo) from the Brazilian province of São Paulo, 1,300 soldiers of cavalry from the Brazilian São Pedro do Rio Grande do Sul province and 11 cannons.

The battle ended with a Luso-Brazilian victory.
