= Jorge de Avilez =

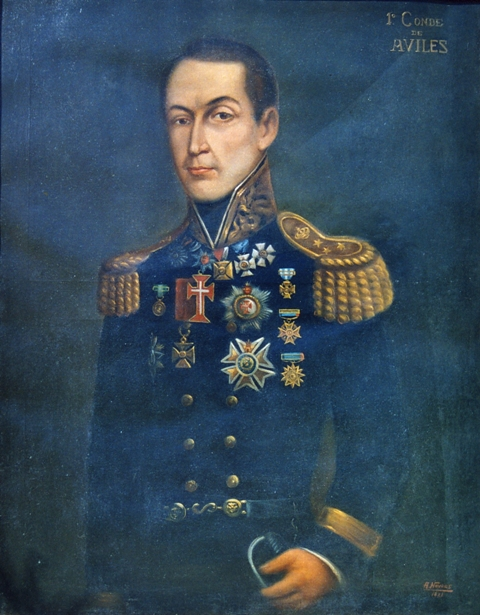
- Portrait of Jorge de Avilez
- Born: 28 March 1785; Portalegre, Portugal
- Died: 15 February 1845 (aged 59); Lisbon, Portugal
- Military career
- Allegiance: Kingdom of Portugal
- Service years: 1804–1845
- Rank: General
- Commands: Militia Regiment of Crato (1804); Volunteer Regiment of Portalegre (1808); 1st Caçadores Battalion (1809); 2nd Infantry Regiment (1812); 5th Infantry Regiment (1814); 1st Brigade of Royal Volunteers of the Prince (1816)
- Conflicts: Peninsular War; Battle of Buçaco; Battle of Pombal; Battle of Fuentes de Oñoro; Siege of Ciudad Rodrigo; Siege of Badajoz; Battle of Salamanca; Battle of Vitoria; Siege of San Sebastián; Siege of Pamplona; Battle of Sorauren; Battle of Orthez; Battle of Toulouse; Portuguese conquest of the Banda Oriental; Liberal Wars

Jorge de Avilez Zuzarte de Sousa Tavares (28 March 1785 – 15 February 1845) was a Portuguese military officer and statesman. He fought in the Peninsular War and in the Portuguese conquest of the Banda Oriental.

== Early life ==
Jorge de Avilez was born on 28 March 1785 in Portalegre, the legitimate son of Jorge Vellez de Souza Tavares. He was baptised on 14 May of the same year.

== Early career ==
Jorge de Alviez entered the Royal College of Nobles in 1797 with his two older brothers. He studied arts until 1801, when he returned to Portalegre. He went to Lisbon with his family in 1801, due to the War of the Oranges. Having finished in the Army as Cadet, he was appointed Colonel of the Militia Regiment of Crato on 24 June 1804. In 1807 he was chosen to be Superintendent of stud farms of Portalegre, the same function his father had. The Militia Regiment of Crato was discharged, because of the Militia Reform of October 1807, in 1808 he was put in charge the Volunteer Regiment of Portalegre, created by the Junta of Portalegre, so they could help fight the French. With the transfer of the Volunteer Regiment to the Army in 1809, he was appointed commander of the 1st Caçadores Battalion with the rank of Lieutenant-Colonel.

== Peninsular War ==
He led the battalion through all their battles in the 2nd Brigade of the Light Division until the Battle of Fuentes de Oñoro. In February 1812 he was promoted to Colonel and given command of the 2nd Infantry Regiment which was part of the renowned Algarve Brigade of the Portuguese Division, which was a division organised in the Anglo-Portuguese Army. He fought at the Siege of Badajoz to the Battle of Toulouse the last big battle of the War of the Sixth Coalition. His wife followed him from Badajoz to Toulouse. In 1816 he was promoted to Brigadier.

== In Brazil ==
In 1817, with the establishment of the Division of Royal Volunteers of the Prince and his being transferred to Brazil to help with the Conquest of Montevideo, he was given the rank of Field Marshal. In 1818, he was made Governor of Montevideo.

He commanded the Campaign of Banda Oriental, distinguishing himself in the Battle of Paço de Arenas in September 1819. In 1821, in Brazil, he was given the rank of Lieutenant-General, due to his appointment as Governor of Arms of the Court and Province of Rio de Janeiro, and suppressing the riots which had been occurring because of the departure of King John VI and the court.

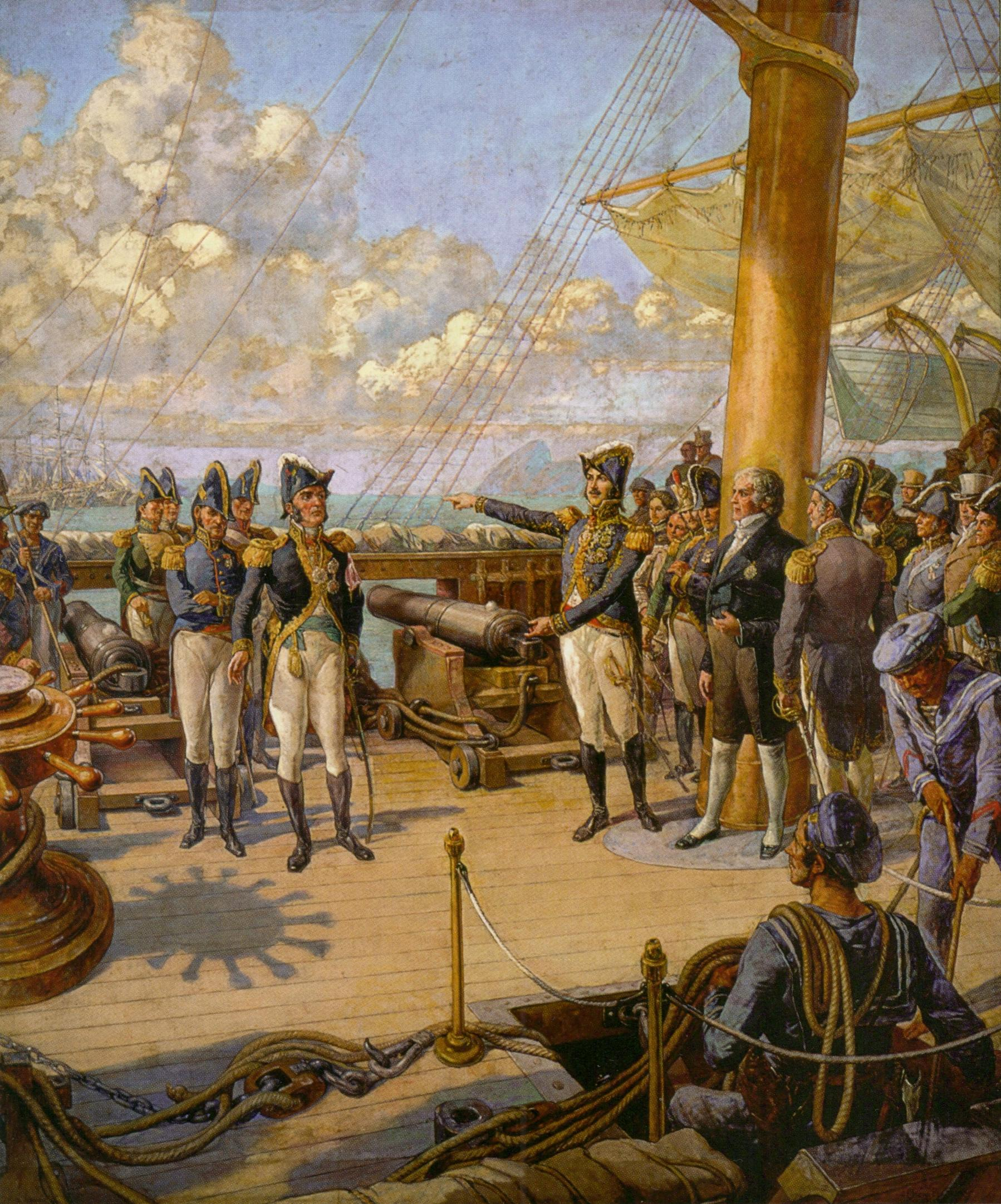
Prince Pedro (to the right) orders the Portuguese officer Jorge d'Avilez (to the left) to return to Portugal after his failed rebellion.

On 5 June 1821, as commander of the soldiers in Rio de Janeiro, he directed the ultimatum to Prince Pedro that he had to swear to uphold the foundations of the Constitution, dismiss the Count of Arcos and nominate a governing junta. In October he demanded again that Prince Pedro publicly announce his adherence to the decisions of the Cortes gathered in Lisbon. Prince Pedro obeyed and decided, on a first impulse, to return to Europe. But in January 1822 he publicly declared that he had decided to stay in Brazil, a fact known as Dia do Fico (Day of Stay). Jorge de Avilez resigned from the Government of Arms and, fearing an attack by Brazilian troops, he retreated to Praia Grande, in Niterói, which he fortified but was later expelled by the Prince Regent. The Portuguese Division embarked in February, arriving at Lisbon in May 1822.

== Liberal Wars ==
Jorge de Avilez was elected deputy in 1822. In 1823, he was nominated by the Cortes as Commander-in-Chief of the Portuguese Army, to counter the movements of Prince Miguel. He could not prevent the coup d'état known as the Vilafrancada, which ended the first liberal period, reestablishing the absolutist regime.

A prisoner in the Castle of São Jorge, he was transferred to the Tower of Belém. Judged, he was dismissed from his rank of Lieutenant-General and condemned to a year of imprisonment in Castelo de Vide. In June 1827, during the regency of the Infanta Isabel Maria of Portugal, he was exonerated and returned to his post. With the return of Prince Miguel, he asked permission to go to Portalegre, but was arrested again in June 1828 and sent to São Julião da Barra Fortress. In 1832 he was transferred to Almeida and later to Bragança, from where he managed to escape to Spain. His wife was arrested and held in the Tower of Belém, in the Limoeiro and in the Cadeia do Aljube. The diplomatic corps in Lisbon demanded his release and succeeded.

King Pedro IV reconciled with Jorge de Avilez at the end of the civil war, and appointed him to Military Governor of the Court and Province of Extremadura, with the rank of Lieutenant-General. With the reorganisation of the Army he was given the command of the 1st Military Division, being later transferred to the 7th, for political reasons. Named Peer of the realm in 1835, he was given the title of Viscount of Reguengo. He joined the Setembrismo movement in 1836. He was appointed senator, according to the Constitution of 1838. In April 1838 he was awarded the title of Count of Avilez.

== Promotions and Units ==
Rank	Unit	Date
Vogal	Supreme Council of Military Justice	8 August 1834
Lieutenant-General		16 June 1834
Military Governor	Court and Province of Estremadura	27 May 1834
Commander-in-chief	Army	21 May 1828
Commander-in-chief	Army	28 May 1823
Governor of Arms	Court and Province of Rio de Janeiro	22 April 1821
Lieutenant General		21 April 1821
Governor	Montevideo	27 January 1818
Field Marshal		25 April 1817
Commandant	1st Brigade of Royal Volunteers of the Prince	
Brigadier		4 March 1816
Colonel	5th Regiment of Infantry	1814
Colonel	2nd Infantry Regiment	5 February 1812
Lieutenant-Colonel	1st Battalion of Caçadores	21 January 1809
Colonel	Volunteer Regiment of Portalegre	22 July 1808
Colonel	Militia Regiment of Crato	24 June 1804
Officer cadet		

== See also ==
- Rossio massacre

== Sources ==
Jorge de Avilez, oficial português
