= Cisplatina =

Former Brazilian province; present day Uruguay

Cisplatina Province Província Cisplatina
- Province of United Kingdom of Portugal, Brazil and the Algarves (1817–1822) and later Empire of Brazil (1822–1828)
- 1817–1828
- Merchant ensign

- Uruguay under Portuguese and Brazilian rule from 1816 to 1822, then from 1822 to 1828 under Brazilian rule.
- Capital: Montevidéu
- Government
  - Type: Provincial government
- Governor
  - 1817–25: Carlos Frederico Lecor
  - 1825–28: Francisco de Paula Maggessi
- History
  - Under Spanish rule then invaded by the United Kingdom of Portugal, Brazil and the Algarves: 1816
  - Annexed to the U.K. of Portugal, Brazil and the Algarves: 1817
  - Preliminary Peace Convention: 28 August 1828
Preceded by	Succeeded by
Federal League (1815–1820)	Oriental State of Uruguay
- Today part of: Uruguay; Brazil

Cisplatina (Brazilian Portuguese: [sisplaˈtʃinɐ], European Portuguese: [siʃplɐˈtinɐ]) was a Brazilian province in existence from 1821 to 1828 created by the Luso-Brazilian invasion of the Banda Oriental. From 1815 until 1822 Brazil was a constituent kingdom of the United Kingdom of Portugal, Brazil and the Algarves. After the independence of Brazil and the formation of the Empire of Brazil the Cisplatina province remained part of it. In 1828, following the Preliminary Peace Convention, the Cisplatina province became independent as Uruguay.

== Name ==
The name comes from the Latin prefix "cis" meaning "on this side of" and "platina", a reference to the Río de la Plata. Thus, the name Cisplatina means "province on the same side of the Río de la Plata", alluding to the fact that, from the Brazilian perspective, the region is located on the same side of the river as Brazil, cf. Cisalpine. The Argentines called the region Banda Oriental, short for Banda Oriental del Río Uruguay ("the strip to the east of the Uruguay River").

== History ==
The Banda Oriental had always been a sparsely populated contested border-area between the Spanish and Portuguese Empires. In the First Treaty of San Ildefonso in 1777 the control of the area was given to Spain.

In 1811, José Gervasio Artigas, who became Uruguay's national hero, launched a successful revolt against Spain, defeating them on 18 May in the Battle of Las Piedras. In 1813, the Banda Oriental was renamed to Provincia Oriental, becoming part of the United Provinces of the Río de la Plata. In 1814, Artigas formed the Federal League, of which he was declared Protector.

The constant growth of influence and prestige of the Federal League frightened the Luso-Brazilian Monarchy (because of its republicanism), and in August 1816 they invaded the Banda Oriental, with the intention of destroying the protector and his revolution. The Luso-Brazilian expeditionary force, thanks to its material superiority, military experience and organization (including in part its European warfare experience), occupied Montevideo on 20 January 1817, and finally, after a three-year struggle in the countryside, defeated the pro-Artigas forces in the Battle of Tacuarembó.

In 1821, the Provincia Oriental del Río de la Plata (present-day Uruguay), was annexed as a province into the Kingdom of Brazil under the name of Cisplatina. The annexation of the province was justified through the "general acclamation" of an Assembly of "Oriental notables" on 18 July 1821.

The borders of Cisplatina were: on the east the Atlantic Ocean, on the south the Río de la Plata, on the west the Uruguay River and on the north the Quaraí River until la Cuchilla de Santa Ana. This means that territories previously belonging to the Provincia Oriental had been annexed to the jurisdiction of Rio Grande do Sul.

Brazil became an independent nation in 1822. On 15 September 1823, the envoy of the Argentine president Bernardino Rivadavia, Valentín Gómez, wrote a memorandum in Rio de Janeiro in which he stated that the Banda Oriental had always belonged to the territory of the United Provinces of the Río de la Plata, present-day Argentina. Gómez received this answer:

"The incorporation of the Cisplatina Province into the Empire is an act of the free will of all its inhabitants, and Brazil, by the sacrifices it has done, is resolute to defend that territory, not allowing that the opinion with respect to the incorporation from that State to the United Provinces is raised again. (…) the Government of H.I.M. [His Imperial Majesty] (…) cannot enter negotiations with the one of Buenos Aires that have as fundamental base the cession of the Cisplatina, whose inhabitants do not have to leave."

As a reaction, a group of Uruguayan insurgents, the Thirty-Three Orientals, led by Juan Antonio Lavalleja, declared independence on 25 August 1825, supported by the United Provinces of the Río de la Plata, which planned to reannex the region.

This led to the Cisplatine War. Despite the Argentine victory in the battle of Ituzaingó, neither side gained the upper hand and, on 27 August 1828, the Preliminary Peace Convention, fostered by the United Kingdom through the mediation of diplomat John Ponsonby, was signed between the Empire of Brazil and the United Provinces, giving independence to the Cisplatina province as the Oriental Republic of Uruguay, and – more importantly to planned British interests – establishing the international status of the Río de la Plata, so that international trade was easier to accomplish.

== Bibliography ==
- Machado, Roberto Pinheiro (2018). Brazilian History: Culture, Society, Politics 1500-2010. Newcastle upon Tyne: Cambridge Scholars Publishing. ISBN 978-1-5275-0349-6.
- Pérez, Demetrio Ramos (1974). Los Criterios contrarios al Tratado de Tordesillas en el siglo XVIII: determinantes de la necesidad de su anulación (in Spanish). Coimbra: Revista da Universidade de Coimbra. Vol. XXV.
