= Francisco de Paula Maggessi, 1st Baron of Vila Bela =

Brazilian general (1769–1847)

Baron of Vila Bela
- Portrait by François-René Moreaux, 1842

Governor of the Provice of Mato Grosso
- In office 6 January 1819 – 20 August 1820
- Preceded by: João Carlos Augusto de Oyenhausen-Gravenburg
- Succeeded by: Office abolished

Governor of the Province of Cisplatina
- In office 1826 – 27 August 1828
- Preceded by: Viscount of Laguna
- Succeeded by: Office abolished

Personal details
- Born: 11 December 1769 Castelo de Vide, Portugal
- Died: 26 June 1847 (aged 77) Rio de Janeiro, Brazil
- Relations: António Tavares Maggessi (brother)

Military service
- Years of service: 1778–1833
- Rank: Army marshal
- Unit: 8th Infantry Regiment; Police Corps of Portugal; 1st Cavalry Regiment
- Commands: Army of the South
- Battles/wars: Cisplatine War

Francisco de Paula Maggessi Tavares de Carvalho, 1st Baron of Vila Bela (11 December 1769 – 26 June 1847) was a Portuguese-born Brazilian general. He governed the captaincy (later province) of Mato Grosso from 1819 to 1821 and the province of Cisplatina from 1826 to 1828, both of which became independent. In his military career, he reached generalship in both the Portuguese and Brazilian armies, achieving, respectively, the ranks of lieutenant general and marshal of the Army, the highest in Brazil's Imperial Army.

== Biography ==
Francisco de Paula Maggessi Tavares de Carvalho was born on 11 December 1769 in Castelo de Vide, Portugal, the son of Italian soldier Tommaso Federico Maggesi and Ana Josefa Tavares da Gama.

He enlisted in the Portuguese Army on 30 November 1778, as a 1st cadet in the 8th Infantry Regiment. He was promoted to alferes of fuzileiros by Decree of 24 December 1787, and to lieutenant of grenadiers by Decree of 25 April 1794. In the same regiment, he was promoted to captain on 17 March 1797.

He was promoted to sergeant major by Decree of 14 January 1802. He was assigned to serve in Portugal's Police Corps, and while serving in that capacity, by Decree of 6 November 1805, he was promoted to lieutenant colonel. He was discharged and ordered to serve in Brazil, reporting for duty in Rio de Janeiro the following year.

In 1808, it was decided to establish the Army's 1st Cavalry Regiment. Under the Decree of 13 May, which established the regiment’s organization, Maggessi was promoted to the rank of colonel and appointed commander of the new regiment. By Decree of 13 May 1809, he was graduated in the rank of brigadier, a position confirmed by another decree dated 13 May 11810. He graduated in the rank of field marshal on 7 December 1815. Maggessi commanded the 1st Cavalry Regiment until 14 July 1817, when, as a graduated field marshal, he was named governor and captain-general of the Captaincy of Mato Grosso.

He went to Mato Grosso, where he took office in Vila Bela on 6 January 1819. He was replaced by the Provisional Constitutional Junta on 20 August 1820. He returned to the Court, where he was promoted to the effectiveness of the rank of lieutenant-general on 24 April 1821.

On 19 May 1825, he was appointed second-in-command of the Army of the South and commander of the Montevideo garrison. He held this position until November of the same year, having been appointed by imperial charter to the position of president and commander of arms of the Cisplatina Province.

By Imperial Charter of 15 February 1827, he was granted the title of Baron of Vila Bela. After the peace treaty between Brazil and Argentina, signed on 27 August 1828, Maggessi returned to Brazil and settled in the city of Rio de Janeiro.

He requested retirement from the Army, which was granted in the rank of Army marshal with the corresponding salary, according to the Imperial Resolution of 31 May 1833. His barony was granted honors of grandeeship by Imperial Charter of 25 March 1845.

Maggessi died in the city of Rio de Janeiro on 26 June 1847, and was buried in the São Francisco de Paula Cemetery. He was awarded the Grand Cross of the Military Order of St. Benedict of Avis and the commandery of the Order of the Conception of Portugal.
