= Battle of Sauce (1816) =

- Part of the Portuguese conquest of the Banda Oriental
Date	8 December 1816
Location	Arroyo Sauce, Uruguay
Result	Federal League victory

Belligerents
United Kingdom of Portugal, Brazil and the Algarves	Federal League

Commanders and leaders
Marshal Pinto de Araújo Correia	Pedro Gutierrez

Strength
2,000 men	Unknown

Casualties and losses
150 men	Unknown

The Battle of Sauce of 1816 took place between the Luso-Brazilian forces under the command of Pinto de Araújo Correia in Arroyo Oriental, modern-day Uruguay. The engagement resulted of the encounter between the Luso-Brazilian forces that had previously defeated the men of Fructuoso Rivera.

The orientals, led by Artiguist commander Pedro Gutierrez, attack by surprise and caused the Luso-Brazilian army to retreat, leaving 150 soldiers dead on the battlefield.
