= Battle of Ibiraocaí =

- Part of the Portuguese conquest of the Banda Oriental
Date	19 October 1816
Location	Rio Grande do Sul, Brazil
Result	Luso-Brazilian victory

Belligerents
United Kingdom of Portugal, Brazil and the Algarves	Federal League

Commanders and leaders
Mena Barreto	José Antonio Berdún

Strength
510	800

Casualties and losses
24 killed and wounded	262 killed and captured

The Battle of Ibiraocaí (Portuguese: Batalha de Ibiraocaí), (Spanish: Batalla de Ibirocay) was fought between an army of the United Kingdom of Portugal, Brazil and the Algarves under João de Deus Mena Barreto and the forces of José Gervasio Artigas commanded by José Antonio Berdún. The Luso-Brazilians were victorious.
