= Battle of Carumbé =

- Part of the Portuguese conquest of the Banda Oriental
Date	27 October 1816
Location	Rio Grande do Sul, Brazil
Result	Luso-Brazilian victory

Belligerents
United Kingdom of Portugal, Brazil and the Algarves	Federal League

Commanders and leaders
Oliveira Álvares	José Artigas

Strength
800 men	850 cavalry 500 infantry 150 indians

Casualties and losses
Unknown	500 killed

The Battle of Carumbé (Portuguese: Batalha de Carumbé), (Spanish: Batalla de Carumbé) was fought between an army of the United Kingdom of Portugal, Brazil and the Algarves and the forces of José Artigas. The battle resulted in a decisive Luso-Brazilian victory, as Artigas' plans to invade Brazil were permanently ruined.
