= Battle of Pando =

Minor military engagement in Uruguay

The Battle of Pando was a minor military engagement during the Portuguese conquest of the Banda Oriental in what is now the nation of Uruguay.
