= Battle of India Muerta =

1816 battle of the Portuguese conquest of the Banda Oriental

- Part of the Portuguese conquest of the Banda Oriental
Date	19 November 1816
Location	Arroyo India Muerta (near present-day Velázquez, Rocha, Uruguay) 34°5′38″S 54°17′42″W
Result	Luso-Brazilian victory

Belligerents
United Kingdom of Portugal, Brazil and the Algarves	Federal League

Commanders and leaders
Sebastião Pinto de Araújo Correia	Fructuoso Rivera

Strength
Total: 957: 722 infantry and artillery; 235 cavalry; 1 cannon	1,700 cavalry and infantry

Casualties and losses
95: 29 killed 66 wounded	~600: ~200 killed 350–400 wounded 30 captured

The Battle of India Muerta took place between the Luso-Brazilian forces under the command of Sebastião Pinto de Araújo Correia against the artiguists led by Fructuoso Rivera in Rocha, present-day Uruguay. The battle lasted for four and a half hours and ended in a Luso-Brazilian victory.
