= Battle of Arapey =

1817 battle of the Portuguese conquest of the Banda Oriental

- Part of the Portuguese conquest of the Banda Oriental
- Portuguese plan of the battle
Date	3 January 1817
Location	Salto, Uruguay
Result	Luso-Brazilian victory

Belligerents
United Kingdom of Portugal, Brazil and the Algarves	Federal League

Commanders and leaders
José de Abreu	José Artigas

Strength
600; 2 artillery pieces	500

Casualties and losses
Light	Very heavy

The Battle of Arapey (Note: Also Arapehy and Arapeí, in both old and modern spellings of Portuguese.) was an encounter between the Luso-Brazilian forces under José de Abreu and the Artiguist forces led by José Artigas, the independentist caudillo himself, in Salto, modern-day Uruguay. On 3 January 1817 Abreu attacked Artigas army in its camp, surprising the defenders. The Luso-Brazilian forces secured a victory and seized all of the supplies of the independentist army.
