= Battle of San Carlos (1817) =

Battle of Apóstoles
- Part of the Portuguese conquest of the Banda Oriental
Date	1818
Location	San Carlos, Argentina
Result	Luso-Brazilian victory

Belligerents
United Kingdom of Portugal, Brazil and the Algarves	Misiones Province

Commanders and leaders
Francisco das Chagas Santos	Andrés Guazurary

Strength
800 men 2 artillery pieces	Unknown

Casualties and losses
Unknown	Nearly all men killed

The Battle of San Carlos took place between the Luso-Brazilian forces under the command of Francisco das Chagas Santos and the Misionero forces led by Andrés Guazurary, popularly known as Andresito, in San Carlos, modern-day Argentina.

After having been defeated by Andresito on the previous year, Francisco das Chagas Santos prepared for a new military campaign against the Misioneros, with a force of 800 men and 2 artillery pieces. After taking the chapel of San Alonso, Chagas headed for the Mission of San Carlos, where the independentist forces led by Andresito and Serapio Rodriguez awaited the invading forces.

After days of very intense fighting, the Luso-Brazilians managed to control most of the town and push Andresito's men to San Carlos' church and college, in which heavy fighting continued to occur, while they expected for reinforcements to come. However, the column of Captain Arand that had the objective of helping the rebels was attacked by the invading army and crushed, having its commander been killed. On the third day of battle, the buildings in which the rebels were caught fire, making their situation even more desperate and forcing them into submission, even though some men, including Andresito himself, managed to escape.

The battle resulted not only in a major victory for the Luso-Brazilians, but also to the de facto elimination of Andresito's threat to them.
