= Division of Royal Volunteers =

Portuguese military unit

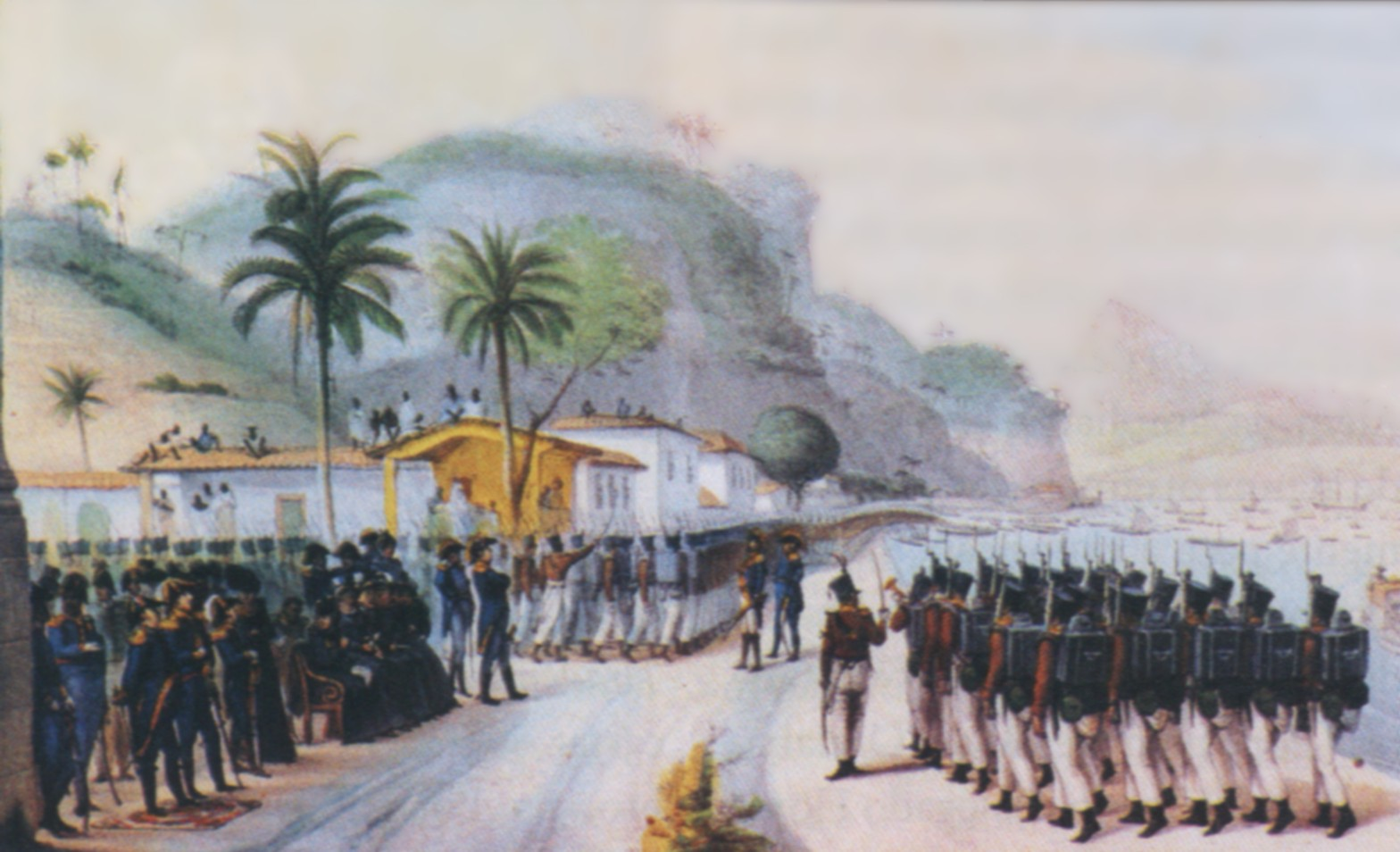
The Division embarks at Praia Grande, Niterói, on 7 June 1816, by Jean-Baptiste Debret

The Division of Royal Volunteers of the Prince (Portuguese: Divisão de Voluntários Reais do Príncipe), later the Division of Royal Volunteers of the King (Divisão de Voluntários Reais do Rei), following the ascension of the Prince Regent to the Throne, was a detachment of the Portuguese Army, formed in 1815 and deployed to Rio de Janeiro on 30 March 1816. The unit was commanded by Carlos Frederico Lecor, Viscount of Laguna.

The unit was formed on order of then-Prince Regent D. João, to consist of 5,000 men, and invaded the Banda Oriental (in modern Uruguay), as part of the Portuguese conquest of the Banda Oriental. The unit occupied the city of Montevideo on 20 January 1817.
