= Battle of Manga =

Battle of the Second Portuguese-Brazilian invasion of the Eastern Bank

The Battle of Manga was a military engagement during the Second Portuguese-Brazilian invasion of the Eastern Bank that took place near Montevideo in what is now the nation of Uruguay.
