= Joaquim Xavier Curado, Count of São João das Duas Barras =

Brazilian military officer and politician

His Excellency The Count of São João das Duas Barras
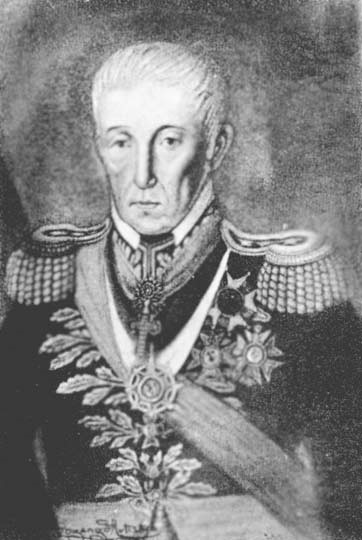
- Reproduction from the 1870s of a contemporaneous portrait from c. 1830 by Simplício Rodrigues de Sá

Minister of War
- In office 1822–1827
- Monarch: Pedro I
- Preceded by: General Avilez

Governor of Santa Catarina
- In office 1800–1805
- Monarch: Maria I

Member of the Council of Procurator generals of the Provinces of Brazil
- In office 3rd of July 1822 until 20th of October 1823

Personal details
- Born: 2 December 1746 Pirenópolis, State of Brazil
- Died: 15 September 1830 (aged 83) Rio de Janeiro, Empire of Brazil

Military service
- Allegiance: Kingdom of Portugal; United Kingdom of Portugal, Brazil and the Algarves; Empire of Brazil
- Years of service: 1764–1823
- Rank: Lieutenant General
- Battles/wars: Portuguese conquest of the Banda Oriental; Brazilian War of Independence

Joaquim Xavier Curado, Count of São João das Duas Barras (2 December 1746 – 15 September 1830), also known as the "creator of the Brazilian army" and the "commander of the army of independence", was a Brazilian military officer, nobleman and politician.

== Biography ==
Born in the Parish of Meia Ponte, today Pirenópolis, son of José Gomes Curado and Dona Maria Josefa Pinheiro, in an aristocratic family. He was descended from many illustrious personages such as Martim Afonso de Sousa, João Gonçalves Zarco and Raposo Tavares. fatherless at an young age, he left as a teenager for Rio de Janeiro, in order to qualify to enter the University of Coimbra. At the age of 21, at the invitation of the Count of Cunha, he left the São José seminary and joined the army as a noble soldier. He headed to the southern border with the expedition of General João Henrique Böhn, with the intention of fighting the Spanish invaders.

Due to his success in the expedition, he was recommended by Viceroy Luís de Vasconcelos e Sousa to replace him in the position in question. In 1797, he was introduced by the Count of Resende to Dom Rodrigo de Sousa Coutinho, being presented with excellent references. In the Count of Rezende's last period in government, he was appointed Governor of Campos dos Goytacazes.

During a voyage to Lisbon, his ship was captured by a French vessel, and he was taken prisoner to the Bay of Biscay. He returned to Rio de Janeiro in 1800. In the same year, he was appointed Interim Governor of Santa Catarina, and received the honors of colonel.

From there, he continued his mission in the Viceroyalty of the Río de la Prata, where he remained until 1820. Upon returning to Rio de Janeiro, he was appointed War Advisor. In 1822, he commanded troops loyal to Emperor Dom Pedro I, defeating the rebel troops of General Jorge Avilez. He died on September 15, 1830, aged 83, in Rio de Janeiro. In 1869 his remains were transferred to a crypt in the cemetery of the order of Saint Francis of Paola by Emperor Dom Pedro II.

== Career ==
In 1774, after receiving the rank of ensign, he marched with the expeditionary army to Rio Grande do Sul, with the aim of expelling the Spanish troops who occupied part of the territory, participating in the Spanish-Portuguese war of 1776–1777.

After the southern campaign ended, he was assigned to defend the inhabitants between the captaincies of São Paulo and Minas Gerais, who were suffering from Indians who plundered farms. He managed to control the war, and guaranteed the permanent occupation of the colonizers. It was at this moment that he showed himself to be a good military strategist.

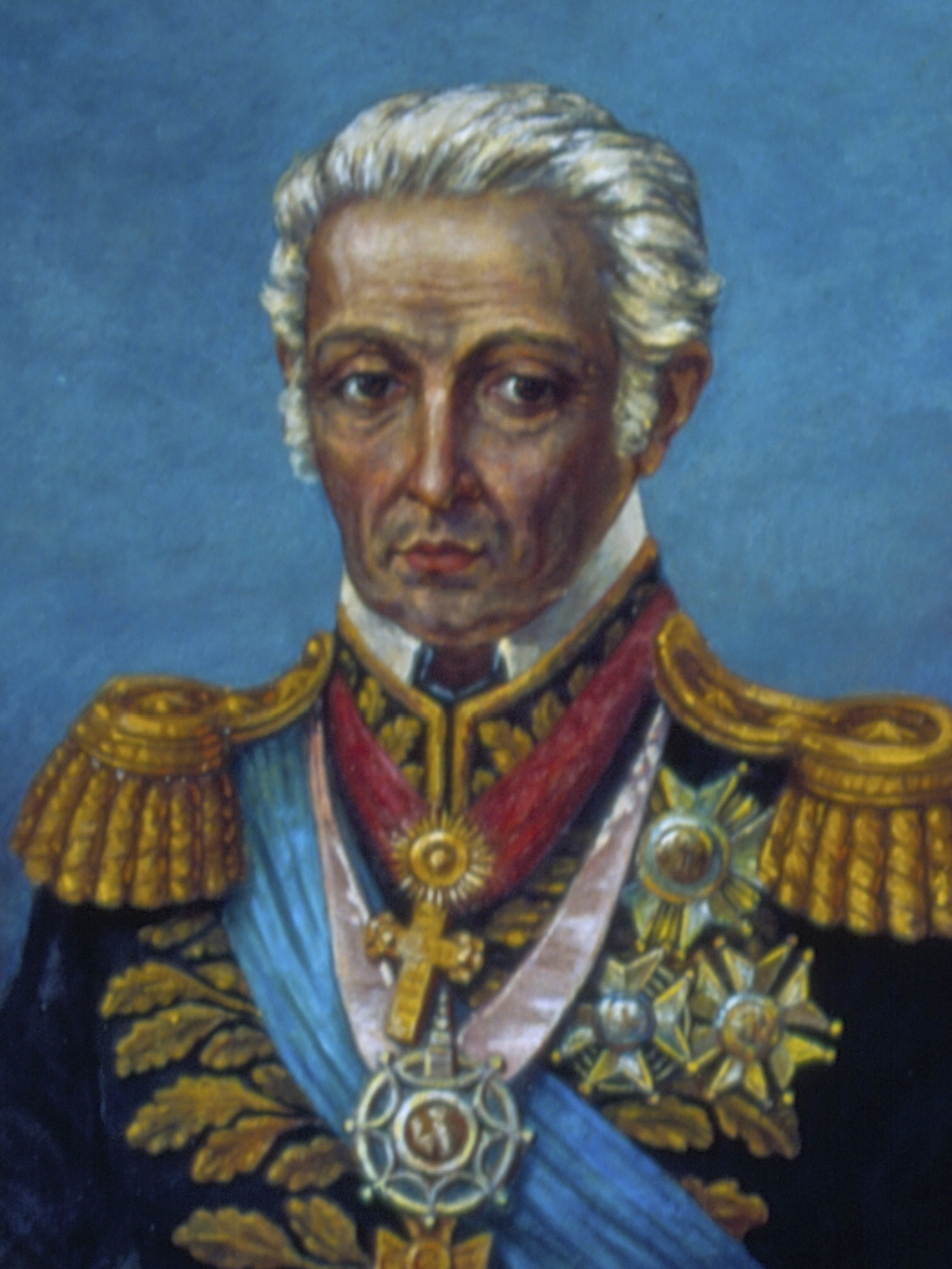
1920 posthumous portrait by Domenico Failutti based on the c. 1830 original by Simplício de Sá

For the good services he provided, the viceroy praised and thanked him, in a report dated August 20, 1789, graduating him to the rank of lieutenant colonel of infantry. In 1795 he was appointed governor of Campos dos Goytacazes, a position he held until 1797.

=== Governor Of Santa Catarina (1800–1805) ===
After the end of his term as Governor of Campos, he went to Europe at the Lisbon court. During the journey, his ship was attacked by a French vessel, and, on orders from above, he threw all the documentation he brought with him into the sea. He continued as a prisoner to the Bay of Biscay, where he went overland to Lisbon. He would only return to Rio de Janeiro in 1800. In the same year, he was appointed Interim Governor of Santa Catarina, also becoming a colonel.

Curado's appointment to the governance of the province was not by chance. The proximity of Santa Catarina to the Viceroyalty of the Río de la Plata was of great interest to the Portuguese Crown, which desired the occupation and consequent annexation of the Platine provinces. For this, the best name would be Colonel Curado, due to his experience in conflicts and negotiations. Since taking office, Curado had planned the occupation of the region. To this end, he coordinated secret work regarding the military capacity of the Viceroyalty of Río de la Prata, which included an investigation into the arsenal and military contingents there.

The report from the secret investigation was quite detailed, containing information such as: plans of fortresses in the Platine region and statistical tables of the Spanish contingent in the region.

In 1805, Xavier Curado returned to Rio de Janeiro after leaving his position in Santa Catarina, and requested reform of the army, which was denied by Viceroy Marcos de Noronha, Count of Arcos, who promoted him to brigadier on 2 June 1806.

=== The Curado report ===
In 1807, the first French invasion of Portugal, with help from Spain, further helped the Portuguese Crown to continue with plans to occupy the Platine provinces, as it would not cause embarrassment, as the action would be justified as a reprisal for French and Spanish policy. in Europe. In 1808, with the new invasion of Portugal, which forced the Portuguese Royal Family to transfer to Brazil, the plan was even more embraced by the Crown. Portugal's main alliance during the incumbency was with Britain. The British had commercial interests in the Americas, and Brazil, the largest country in the region, was the focus. However, the Brazilians understood the importance of the platinum provinces, especially with regard to the flow of imported products. Therefore, he wanted the annexation of the Rio da Prata region by Brazil.

The plan for annexation was intended be completed soon after the arrival of the Royal Family in Brazil. And the information from Joaquim Xavier Curado provided security for entry into the Viceroyalty of the Río de la Prata. As soon as the Court was installed in the country, Dom Rodrigo de Sousa Coutinho, a Portuguese diplomat, put the plan into action. At first, probably following Curado's instructions, he sought to convince the colonial elites of the annexation, in addition to trying to convince the platine leaders of the advantages of becoming part of Brazil. After the peaceful attempt at annexation, Dom Rodrigo de Sousa Coutinho decided to begin his plans to have a more aggressive foreign policy with the platine region. Days after sending a letter to the Platine leaders suggesting annexation, he decides to send Joaquim Xavier Curado back to Spanish territory.

=== Back in the Rio de la Plata ===
Dom Rodrigo de Sousa Coutinho gave very specific instructions for Curado's mission in the region. They consisted, firstly, of entering Montevideo and Buenos Aires without raising suspicion, with the supposed purpose of negotiating on behalf of Portugal. The second was to try to convince the leaders of how an annexation of the platine provinces would be beneficial for all parties involved. And, finally, it was necessary to examine how public opinion would react to a handover to the Portuguese Government, as well as the military conditions enjoyed by the Spanish.

However, some factors begin to change the "Curado mission". First, a Spanish army officer is discovered in Rio de Janeiro trying to obtain a passport to Buenos Aires. He was the brother of Santiago de Liniers, viceroy of Buenos Aires. As soon as the court became aware of the official's presence, a warrant was issued for his arrest and for him to be taken to the palace. There, Dom Rodrigo adopted a more diplomatic stance, making it clear that he aimed for peace between the Spanish and Portuguese.

However, the Spanish leaders were already aware of the presence of Xavier Curado in platinum territory, and sent a letter to the court criticizing the "Curado Mission", remembering that the officer's presence did not contribute to peace between the two countries.

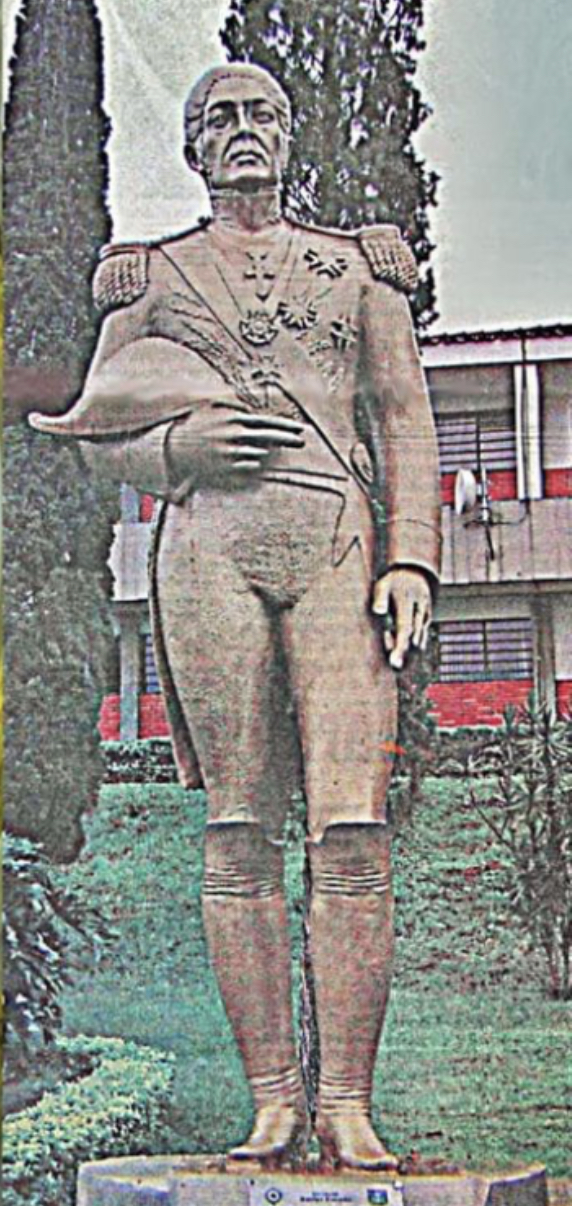
Statue of the Count of São João das Duas Barras

At that time, Curado was in Montevideo. However, aiming to strengthen ties with Santiago de Liniers, he sent a letter to him and to the governor of Montevideo requesting permission to go to Buenos Aires. On April 26, 1808, Liniers accepted Curado's request for entry, and that he would be provided with everything necessary for disembarking in the city. Even so, Curado's presence arouses suspicion among colonial authorities, who ask for explanations, which are promptly answered in a way that makes it clear that Curado's mission was restricted to dealing with trade between the two nations.

Even so, Platense leaders meet to discuss the Portuguese threat. The first measure was to discover the financial and military needs to ask for help from Spain, the Viceroyalty of Peru and other neighboring provinces. The letters sent deal with the distrust that the leaders had not only in the presence of Joaquim Xavier Curado, but also in the diplomatic exercise of Dom Rodrigo de Sousa Coutinho. It ends by highlighting that there was no doubt that the Portuguese Government had become a declared enemy.

After realizing how dangerous the Portuguese Court had become, members of the Buenos Aires government ordered the Governor of Montevideo to detain Joaquim Xavier Curado and, consequently, not allow him to go to Buenos Aires. Furthermore, some troops were ordered to invade areas of Portuguese settlement on the Platina borders, mainly in the region of Rio Grande do Sul. The war had practically begun.

The assessment was that the Portuguese forces would not have enough strength not only for an offensive, but also to maintain a war with Spain and its colonies. Furthermore, Spanish power was overestimated, as the country was extremely worn out by the French invasions and the internal crisis in the House of Bourbon. Furthermore, the Viceroyalty of Peru and other colonial armies were extremely worn down by indigenous rebellions at the meeting, such as the Túpac Amaru Revolt; therefore, they could not help in a war with Portugal.

Joaquim Xavier Curado remained close to the platinum borders, but had not yet arrived in Montevideo. However, after learning of the Count of Liniers' condition in Rio de Janeiro, Santiago de Liniers orders Curado to be sent directly to Buenos Aires. Liniers demands the brigadier's credentials as a negotiator for the Portuguese Government, knowing that he did not have any formal document to prove this fact. Even though Curado claims to be "legitimately authorized and informed of the objects of my commission; as Delegate of the Portuguese Government", Liniers questions him claiming that he does not have legitimate powers to negotiate. Therefore, it is ordered that Curado be held hostage until the Count of Liniers returns to the viceroyalty.

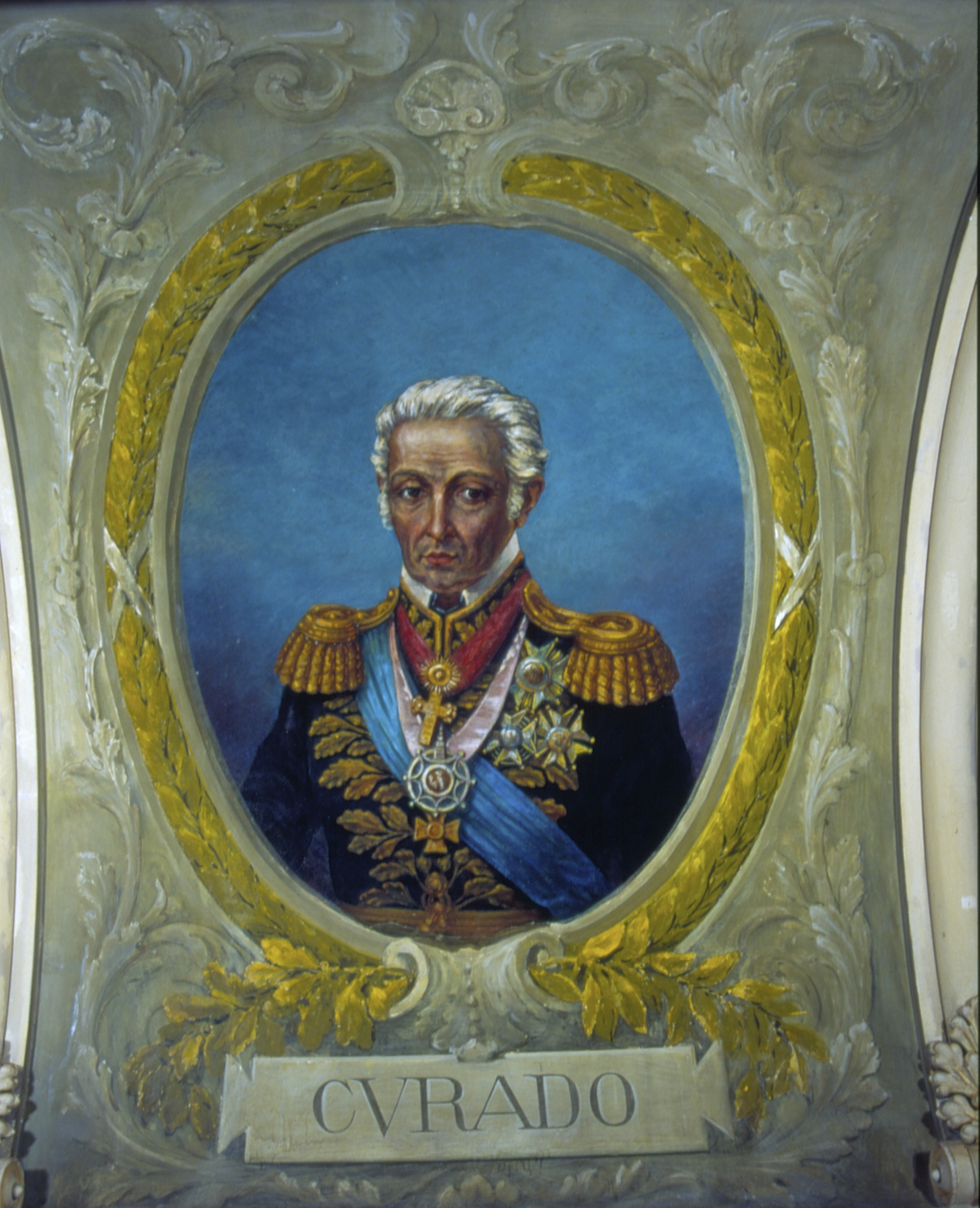
Fresco made by Domenico Failutti in 1925 located in the Ipiranga Museum.

The lack of credentials, which connoted the fact that Brigadier Curado would not be on an official mission, therefore carrying out clandestine activities, caused a diplomatic crisis between Portugal and Spain. At the same time, news from Santiago Liniers' brother, imprisoned in Rio de Janeiro, caused him to send a letter to Brazil demanding the release of his family member and criticizing the presence of Joaquim Xavier Curado in Spanish territory without credentials. Even so, he reiterates his desire to maintain peace with the Portuguese Court.

Even so, Dom Rodrigo de Sousa Coutinho decides to take a more offensive position, asking Curado to order the Viceroy of the River Plate to hand over the guard of the northern bank of the River Plate to Portuguese control, as such a measure would be indispensable to avoid for French troops to land there and disturb the peace in Brazil. Curado receives the orders, and sends a letter to the Court detailing the conditions for a possible invasion. The report states that the Viceroyalty of Rio de la Plata would be in a kind of "anarchy", as Spanish power in the region suffered from a crisis of legitimacy among the people, mainly to the detriment of the French invasions of Spain. Therefore, the troubled climate would favor the Portuguese.

Curado still makes it clear to Dom Rodrigo that an invasion with great military power was the best strategy, since any possible military advantage would be successful. Therefore, he suggests that an invasion be carried out, either by assault, or through a land and sea blockade. Soon, at the end of 1808, the São Paulo legion was sent in secret to Rio Grande do Sul.

=== Conflict with Queen Carlota Joaquina ===
Curado continued his mission in the Viceroyalty of Rio de la Plata, keeping the Court informed about everything that was happening. The brigadier reported, for example, the arrival of French delegates in the region, who had the mission of informing Santiago de Liniers about the abdication of Carlos IV in favor of Joseph Bonaparte. With that, the colonies should also acclaim him king. Meanwhile, Fernando VII is proclaimed king, and the French emissaries are expelled.

However, even with the work well done in Rio de la Plata, the discovery of the Curado Mission by the Spanish, with a reaction from neighboring provinces, caused even greater distress with Santiago Liniers and also with Princess Carlota Joaquina. In a letter addressed to the princess, Liniers criticizes the actions of Curado, who, in addition to having no credentials, made proposals that were not in line with a negotiating mission. And because of that, he had almost caused a war.

Therefore, Dona Carlota sends a letter to her husband, Dom João VI, saying that the "Mission Curado" violated Spanish laws and that he should order the brigadier to be expelled from the platine region. Furthermore, she emphasizes that negotiations should be carried out directly between the two courts, through officials.

=== Change of plans in the Platine region and Curado's future ===
With the fall of the Spanish monarchy and the arrival of Admiral Sidney Smith in Rio de Janeiro, Portuguese plans for Rio de la Plata were changed. Firstly, because in the Peninsular War, Britain and Spain were allies. Therefore, any plan for a military invasion of Spanish territories by the British would be scrapped. Furthermore, Britain was already beginning to think about the independence of the Spanish colonies as the most advantageous means for British trade. And, finally, with the loyalty to Fernando VII, sworn by all the Spanish colonies, the invasion would necessarily have to happen through military means, as Joaquim Xavier Curado had previously anticipated. And as Britain could not intervene militarily in the region due to the agreement made, Portugal would be alone in the undertaking.

However, both Britain and Portugal still desired to have influence in the Platine provinces. To this end, Smith, a commander in the Royal Navy, devised a plan that involved Carlota Joaquina. It consisted of transforming the Infanta of Spain into Regent. At first, the idea displeased the Portuguese cabinet, but the chance to have control over the Viceroyalty of Rio de la Prata and all of Spanish America, a new sort of Iberian Union, made Dom Rodrigo de Sousa Coutinho take the matter further.

Therefore, Dom Rodrigo asked the Duke of Palmela to do everything possible in favor of the appointment of Dona Carlota Joaquina to the regency of Spain. He still had the support of part of the Spanish nobility, who were in favor of the nomination. But, the intention was not for Dona Carlota to govern. Therefore, he begins to work under the name of the princess's cousin, Dom Pedro Carlos. Aiming to put his name on the ballot for the Spanish regency, he arranged a marriage with Dona Carlota's daughter, Infanta Maria Teresa of Braganza.

Even so, the idea did not please everyone. The British ambassador to Portugal, Lord Strangford, was vehemently against it as he believed that Carlota Joaquina's position was unfavorable to British interests. Strangford also worked to dispel once and for all the idea of invading the Viceroyalty of Rio de la Plata.

Later, Dom João VI would be sure that British no longer insisted on a partnership with Portugal, and that Britain was working for the independence of the Spanish provinces. Even so, Dom Rodrigo de Sousa Coutinho continued with the desire to annex the platinum region, and made Joaquim Xavier Curado remain on the border, informing him about everything that was happening there. Curado also asks the governor of the captaincy of Rio Grande to monitor the Spanish and have troops ready for battle in case the countries' foreign policy changes. Coutinho, in another correspondence, asks for attention to the attitudes of the Governor of Montevideo and for the brigadier to make him "prove his honor and loyalty".

After the May 1810 revolution, Curado was sent to Rio Grande do Sul, leading one of the army columns, in the service of Dom Diogo de Souza. Their task was also to conquer the Banda Oriental. With the loyalty of Buenos Aires and Montevideo to the Spanish government, dissent over what stance to take in relation to the platine provinces heated up Brazilian politics. Three currents continued to dominate the court: that of Dom Rodrigo, who still defended the military invasion; of Dona Carlota, who wanted the regency of Spain and its colonies; and Lord Strangford, who maintained his position of supporting independence from Spain. The divergences between the three parties caused Portuguese-Brazilian politics in the Platina provinces to stagnate.

Thanks to the success of the venture with Dom Diogo de Souza, Curado was promoted to the rank of lieutenant general on May 13, 1813.

Between 1815 and 1820 he participated in the War against Artigas, a Uruguayan soldier who went to war against the Portuguese-Brazilian army that had invaded the Banda Oriental. In the battle of Catalán, in 1817, Xavier Curado was awarded the commendation of the Tower and Sword, for his acts of bravery as 2nd commander of the army. He was the only one who did not accompany D. João VI from Portugal to Brazil in 1808 to be awarded this distinction.

As the Marquis of Alegrete, supreme commander of the Army in the South, had withdrawn from the fight, Curado assumed command and established his barracks in the vicinity of Passo-do-Lageado, where he received the diploma of commander of the Tower and Sword, Loyalty and Merit, conferred by D. João VI.

=== Curado and the Brazilian Independence ===
In 1822, he commanded troops loyal to Dom Pedro I in battle with the forces of General Jorge de Avilez in liberating Rio De Janeiro. Organizing a troop of six thousand soldiers, he supported the Fico Day, and was therefore honored, at the hands of D. Pedro I, with the titles of baron with greatness and count of São João das Duas Barras, on October 20, 1825 and September 7, 1826.

In 1822 he was appointed by D. Pedro I as Governor of Arms of the court, he remained in the position until 1827. He was the representative of Santa Catarina in the Council of Procurator Generals of the Provinces of Brazil, from July 3, 1822 to October 20, 1823.

== Titles and Honours ==
Styles of Joaquim Xavier Curado, Count of São João das Duas Barras
- Reference style: His Excellency
- Spoken style: Your Excellency

=== Nobility titles ===
- Baron with greatness of São João das Duas Barras, October 20, 1825
- Count of São João das Duas Barras, September 7, 1826

=== Brazilian decorations ===
- Knight commander of the Imperial Order of São Bento de Avis
- Grand Cross of the Imperial order of the Southern Cross

=== Portuguese decorations ===
- Knight commander of Military Order of the Tower and Sword
