= Carlos Frederico Lecor, Viscount of Laguna =

Portuguese-born Brazilian general and politician

Viscount of Laguna
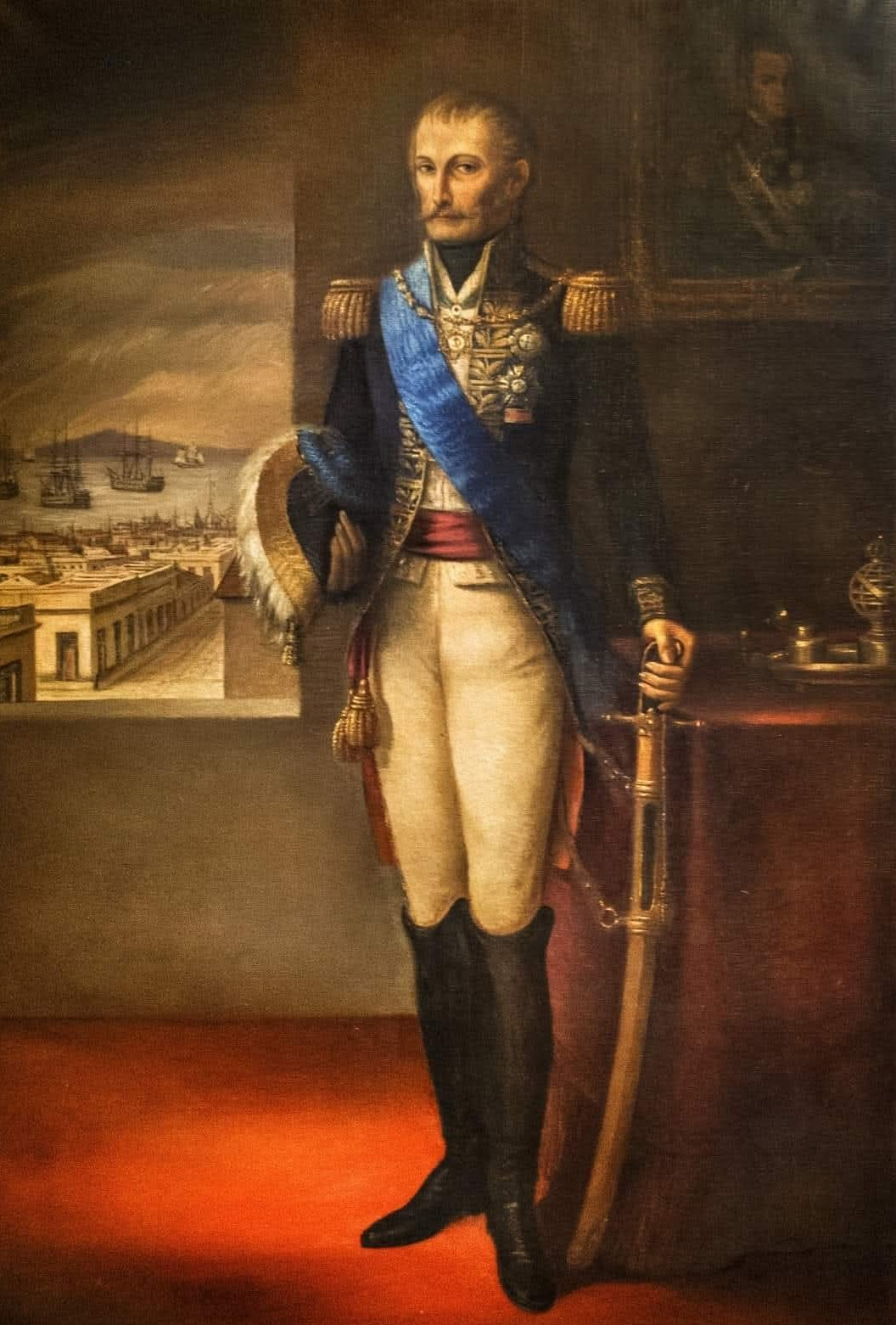

President of Cisplatina
- In office January 20, 1817 – February 3, 1826
- Monarchs: João VI; Pedro I
- Preceded by: Miguel Barreiro (Governor of the Oriental Province)
- Succeeded by: Francisco de Paula Maggessi

Personal details
- Born: 6 October 1764 Lisbon, Kingdom of Portugal
- Died: 2 August 1836 (aged 71) Rio de Janeiro, Empire of Brazil
- Occupation: Politician

Military service
- Allegiance: Kingdom of Portugal; United Kingdom of Portugal, Brazil and the Algarves; Empire of Brazil
- Rank: Marshal of the Army (Brazil); Lieutenant General (Portugal/United Kingdom)
- Battles/wars: Peninsular War; Battle of Garris; Portuguese conquest of the Banda Oriental; Cisplatine War

Carlos Frederico Lecor (Note: His last name is sometimes written as Lecór or Le Cor.) (6 October 1764 – 2 August 1836) was a Portuguese-born Brazilian general and politician. He was the first Baron of Laguna, in Portugal, and later ascended to Viscount of Laguna, in Brazil. He was the first Portuguese officer to command a division, the 7th Division, of British troops, in Wellington's Peninsular Army, as well as having commanded the Portuguese forces who invaded the Banda Oriental del Uruguay (Eastern Bank of Uruguay) in 1816.

== Early life and military career (1764–1807) ==
Son of Louis Pierre Lecor, a French émigré, and Quitéria Maria Krusse, Carlos Frederico Lecor was born in the Parish of Santos-o-Velho, in Lisbon. He had French ancestry from his father, and German, Dutch and Spanish ancestry by his mother.

He was born into merchant families, and, as the older son of five, was destined to pursue a commercial career. Instead, having moved to Faro in the decade of 1770, he would eventually enlist in the Portuguese Army, as a Pé de Castelo (Castle Guard) in 1793, as a gunner, at the age of 29.

Having been placed at the Fortress of Santo António da Barra, in Tavira, he rose to the rank of sergeant. He was then made an adjutant to the military commander of Portimão, presumably at officer level. In 1794, he became first lieutenant in the Artillery Regiment of Algarve, as second in command of the 9th Company of gunners.

In 1795 and 1796, he was part of the artillery complement of the Nau Príncipe da Beira, the flagship of a fleet escorting commercial ships to Salvador, in Brazil. Upon returning to Lisbon, he was promoted to captain in the Light Troops Legion, an experimental unit of the Portuguese Army, eventually becoming the aide-de-camp to General Marquis of Alorna. In this capacity he was promoted to major (1802) and lieutenant-colonel (1805).

== Peninsular War (1807–1814) ==
On the occasion of the first French Invasion of Portugal, in November 1807, Carlos Frederico Lecor is credited with having spotted the invading army, commanded by Junot, north of Abrantes, and having personally informed the Prince-Regent, future King John VI.

As Lecor did not want to serve in the Légion Portugaise, formed out of the remnants of the dismantled Portuguese Army to serve Napoleon, he fled to Plymouth, England, hoping to embark to Brazil. However, on hearing the news of the Portuguese uprisings of June 1808, he participated in the creation of the Loyal Lusitanian Legion, a military unit created by the Portuguese exiles in England. He then returned to Portugal, with Colonel Robert Wilson. Despite being originally made responsible for the recruitment of a second battalion of the Legion, he was made colonel of the 23rd Infantry Regiment, in Almeida, in December 1808.

Between 1809 and 1813, Lecor acted as commander of several units in the Portuguese Army, mainly brigade-level, and as military commander of the Beira Baixa region, based in Castelo Branco. He was promoted to brigadier general on May 8, 1811. For a brief period in 1811, he commanded the Portuguese Brigade of the Allied 7th Division. He participated in the Bussaco campaign, as well as the Lines of Torres Vedras, under general Rowland Hill.

On the eve of the Vitoria Campaign, in 1813, Lecor was placed again at the command of the Portuguese Brigade (later numbered 6th) of the 7th Division of the Anglo-Portuguese Army, under the command of Lord Dalhousie. He was promoted to major general (Marechal de Campo) on 4 June 1813. He then went on to fight at the Battle of Sorauren, as brigade commander and the Battle of Nivelle, acting as commander of the 7th Division. He was then placed as the commander of the Portuguese Division, which he commanded until the end of the war, participating in the Battle of the Nive, on its last day, also called the Battle of St. Pierre.

== Service in Brazil and Uruguay (1815–1829) ==
Having returned to Portugal, in mid-1814, after the conclusion of the Peninsular War, Lecor was appointed military governor of the Alentejo for a brief period of time.

In June, 1815, he was promoted to lieutenant general and appointed commander of the Prince's Royal Voluntary Division (Divisão de Voluntário Reais do Príncipe) a unit to be sent for service in Brazil, made up mostly of peninsular veterans.

In 1816 he led the successful Portuguese conquest of the Banda Oriental against the Federal League of José Gervasio Artigas, who had liberated the Banda Oriental (present-day Uruguay) from Spanish rule the year before.

He personally ruled the newly conquered Cisplatina Province, until the Cisplatine War of 1825–1828. During this war, he succeeded in defending Montevideo against an Argentine-Uruguayan siege, but when Uruguay became independent in the peace treaty, he had to return to Brazil.

== Bibliography ==
- Ferreira, Fábio (2012). O General Lecor, os voluntários reais e os conflitos pela independência do Brasil na Cisplatina (PDF). Niterói: Universidade Federal Fluminense.
- CHARTRAND, René & YOUNGHUSBAND, Bill. The Portuguese Army of the Napoleonic Wars. (vol. 2), Oxford: Osprey, 2000.
- DUARTE, Paulo de Queirós (1984), Lecor e a Cisplatina 1816–1828 (3 vv.), Biblioteca do Exército: Rio de Janeiro.
- QUINTA-NOVA, Jorge (2008), "Carlos Frederico Lecor: The Making of a Portuguese General", in: "Napoleon Series", [March 3, 2010]
- SILVA, Alfredo P.M. Os Generais do Exército Brasileiro, 1822 a 1889, M. Orosco & Co., Rio de Janeiro, 1906, vol. 1, 949 pp.
- SILVA LOPES, João Baptista. Corografia, ou Memoria Economica, Estadistica, e Topografica do Reino do Algarve. Lisbon: Academia Real das Sciencias, 1841.
- TEIXEIRA BOTELHO, Gen. José Justino. Novos Subsídios para a História da Artilharia Portuguesa. Lisbon: Comissão de História Militar, 1944.
