= Battle of Tacuarembó =

1820 battle of the Portuguese conquest of the Banda Oriental

- Part of the Portuguese conquest of the Banda Oriental
- Portuguese plan of the battle
| Date | 22 January 1820 |
| Location | Near Tacuarembó River (present-day Rivera Department, Uruguay) 31°5′34″S 55°41′32″W |
| Result | Luso-Brazilian victory |
| Territorial changes | Annexation of the Banda Oriental by the United Kingdom of Portugal, Brazil and the Algarves |

Belligerents
| United Kingdom | Federal League |

Commanders and leaders
| Count of Figueira | Andrés Latorre; Pantaleón Sotelo † |

Strength
| 1,200–4,000; 2 guns | 2,000–2,500; 4 guns |

Casualties and losses
| 6: 1 killed 5 wounded | 1,005: 500 killed 505 captured |

The Battle of Tacuarembó took place between the Luso-Brazilian forces under José de Castelo Branco Correia, the Count of Figueira, and the Artiguist forces of Andrés Felipe Latorre near Tacuarembó, modern-day Uruguay.

The encounter resulted in a catastrophe for the Artiguist army. Indeed, out of 2,500 men, 500 were killed and 505 were captured, while the Luso-Brazilian forces only had 6 casualties (1 soldier killed and 5 wounded).

Due to the complete annihilation of Latorre's forces, the battle was a severe blow to the independentist cause and determined the victory of the United Kingdom of Portugal, Brazil and the Algarves in the war.

== See also ==
- Colonial Uruguay
- Portuguese conquest of the Banda Oriental
