= Andrés Guazurary =

Argentine general (1778–1825)

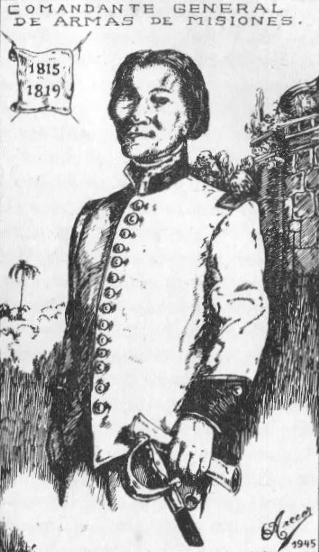
Andrés Guaçurary

Andrés Guaçurary or Andrés Guazurarí, popularly known as Andresito (30 November 1778 – 1825) was a caudillo of the province of Misiones, present-day Argentina, being governor of said province between 1811 and 1822. He was one of the first federal caudillos of the United Provinces of the Río de la Plata and the only one of fully indigenous origin.

He was born in the misión of Santo Tomé, Corrientes or São Borja to a Guarani family. He was taken as a foster child by José Gervasio Artigas who allowed him to sign as Andrés Artigas, to avoid being excluded by his Guarani origins.

He served in the Army of the North of Manuel Belgrano, and in the Artiguista Army during the Portuguese conquest of the Banda Oriental, as General Commander. He died in Rio de Janeiro in 1825.

Having achieved the rank of colonel during his service in the armed forces of the United Provinces, in April 2014 he was posthumously promoted to General of the Argentine Army by presidential decree.
