= Portuguese conquest of the Banda Oriental =

Armed-conflict in the Banda Oriental

- Part of the Platine Wars
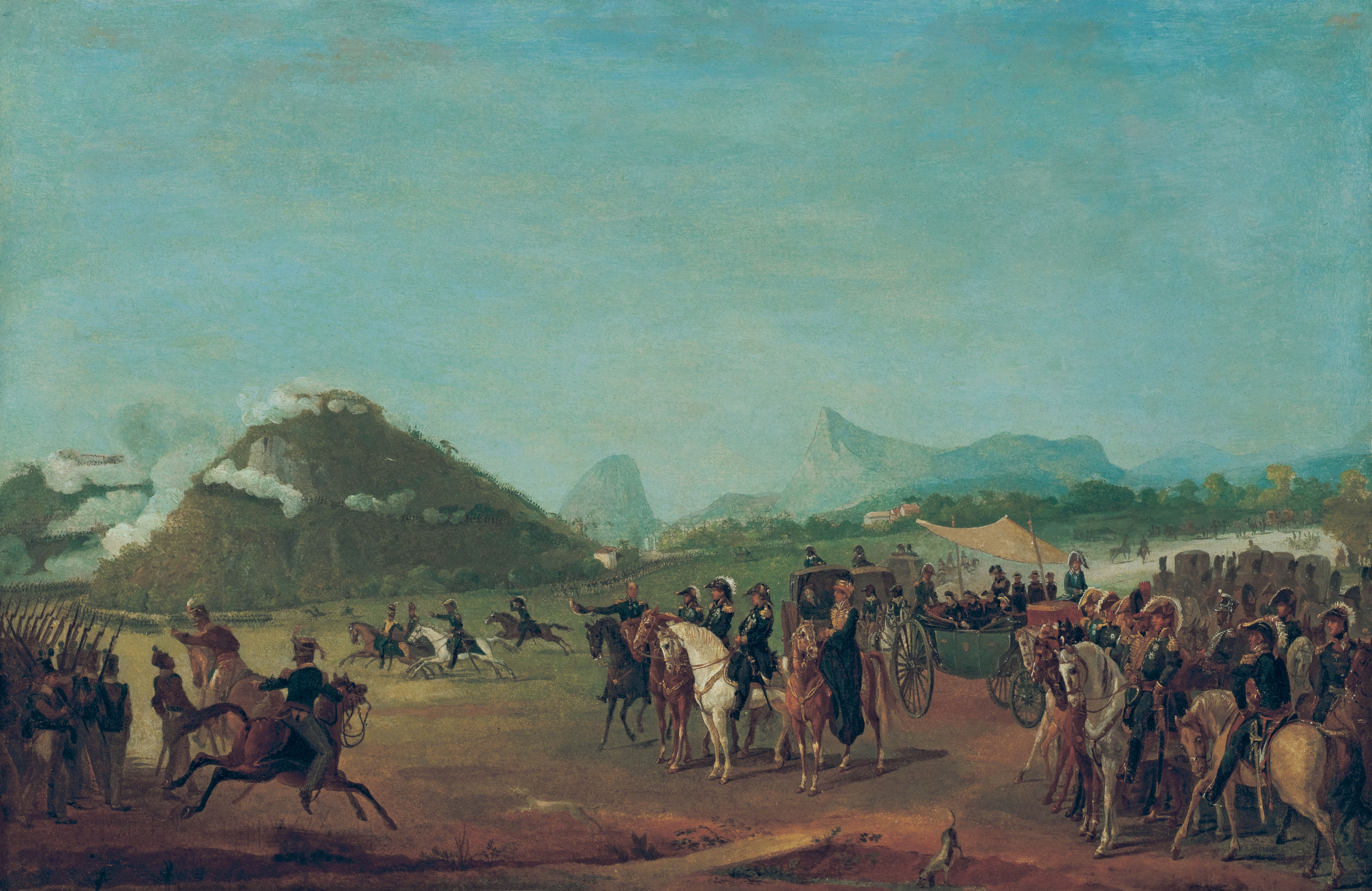
- Review of the troops destined to Montevideo, oil on canvas by Jean-Baptiste Debret, c. 1816; At the center, on a white horse, is king John VI. Pointing his hat, on the left, is general William Beresford
Date	1816–1820
Location	Uruguay, Brazil, Argentina
Result	Luso-Brazilian victory
Territorial changes	Annexation of the Banda Oriental by the United Kingdom of Portugal, Brazil and the Algarves

Belligerents
United Kingdom of Portugal, Brazil, and the Algarves	Federal League; Entre Ríos; Misiones; Corrientes; Santa Fe; Córdoba

Commanders and leaders
John VI; Carlos F. Lecor; Joaquim X. Curado; José de Abreu; Count of Figueira; Sena Pereira	José Artigas; Andrés Guazurary; Fructuoso Rivera; Andrés Latorre; Fernando Otorgués; Peter Campbell

Strength
10,000–12,000	Unknown

The Portuguese conquest of the Banda Oriental, known in the Spanish-speaking world as the Luso-Brazilian invasion (Spanish: Invasión lusobrasileña) and in the Portuguese-speaking world as the War against Artigas (Portuguese: Guerra contra Artigas), was the armed-conflict that took place between 1816 and 1820 in the Banda Oriental, for control of what today comprises the whole of the Republic of Uruguay, the northern part of the Argentine Mesopotamia and southern Brazil. The four-year armed-conflict resulted in the annexation of the Banda Oriental into the United Kingdom of Portugal, Brazil and the Algarves as the Brazilian province of Cisplatina.

The belligerents were, on one side, the "Artiguistas" led by José Gervasio Artigas and some leaders of other provinces that made up the Federal League, like Andrés Guazurary, and on the other, the troops of the United Kingdom of Portugal, Brazil and the Algarves, directed by Carlos Frederico Lecor.

On the naval front, the conflict far exceeded the Río de la Plata and the Argentine coast to spread globally, as the Insurgent privateers, most notably under the flag of Buenos Aires and flag of Artigas, harassed Portuguese ships in Europe, Africa and the Caribbean.

The occupation of the Banda Oriental by the United Kingdom of Portugal, Brazil and the Algarves, replaced by the Empire of Brazil in 1824, lasted until 1828.

== Causes ==
The causes that led King John VI of the United Kingdom of Portugal, Brazil and the Algarves, whose court had been installed in Rio de Janeiro since 1808, to embark on the invasion of the Banda Oriental can be divided into general and circumstantial.

Among the first is located in the main place, the former Portuguese aspiration to bring the frontiers of Brazil to the coast of Río de la Plata (Portuguese: Rio da Prata), arguing that it matched the Tordesillas line by which Spain and Portugal had divided the world in 1494. For that reason, the region of the Rio de la Plata was a border area between Spain and Portugal, and as such, a highly conflictive area and theater of bloody battles over the centuries, even after the American colonies became independent of the European powers.

The Río de la Plata was strategic because it is the starting point of a large river basin, the fifth in the world, that goes to the heart of South America, from near mining areas in Potosí (current Bolivia), through Paraguay, Mato Grosso and reaching São Paulo. Additionally, the Banda Oriental, in the eighteenth and early nineteenth centuries, was an area of major agricultural wealth, which was organized on the old dairy and beef production, a staple of African slaves who constituted the Brazilian economic base

Following that line of historical conflict, Buenos Aires was founded in 1536 to prevent the Portuguese from extending beyond the Río de la Plata. During the period between 1580 and 1640, in which the Kingdom of Portugal was part of the Iberian Union together with the Kingdom of Spain under the "Catholic Monarchy", Spain relaxed precautions on the ill-defined borders between the two kingdoms, a circumstance that Portugal took to expand the territory of Brazil, to the west and south.

In 1680 the Kingdom of Portugal founded the Colonia del Sacramento (Portuguese: Colonia do Sacramento), the first settlement in what is now Uruguay, right in front of Buenos Aires, on the other bank of the Rio de la Plata. Since then several clashes occur and precarious agreements between the Portuguese and Spanish in the Banda Oriental and the Misiones.

Portugal also took the troubled political circumstances produced from Napoleon's invasion of Spain in 1808, introducing the Princess Carlota Joaquina, wife of John VI and sister of King Ferdinand VII, captive of Napoleon, as the best alternative to protect the interests of Spanish crown. However, the common struggle against Napoleon Bonaparte, who invaded Spain in order to attack Portugal, as their government disregarded the Continental System imposed on them by France, led Portugal to avoid a disagreement with Spain and the occupation projects were delayed.

The occupation of the Misiones Orientales (Portuguese: Missões Orientais) in 1801 by Portuguese troops, commanded by bandeirante José Francisco Borges do Canto and attempts to generate a protectorate during the crisis of 1808, were closer antecedents. The crisis began when the governor of Montevideo Francisco Javier de Elío came into conflict with the Viceroy of the Río de la Plata, Santiago de Liniers, who came to the political break with the constitution of the Junta of Montevideo on 21 September that year. The Portuguese monarchy took advantage of the situation by sending the military and diplomatic Joaquín Javier Curado to offer, in terms restraining orders, acceptance of the protectorate in the Banda Oriental on the argument the preserve it from a Viceroy considered "Afrancesado". Elio rejected the offer at first, but the course of political events from the 1810 May Revolution in Buenos Aires allowed the Portuguese, on two occasions, to attempt armed seizure of the territory. Those times were 1811 and 1816.

The Misiones Oirentales region and present-day borders.

The Portuguese invasion of 1811, was the result of a request by then viceroy of Río de la Plata, Francisco Javier de Elio, in support of the Spanish authorities against Artiguist revolutionaries. This invasion took place in the context, as already mentioned, of the May Revolution, where the influence of the same Elío established the capital of the Viceroyalty of the Río de la Plata in Montevideo, thereby becoming viceroy. The revolution had infiltrated in the Banda Oriental after the Cry of Asencio. José Rondeau and José Artigas commanded the troops that, after the Battle of Las Piedras, besieged Montevideo on May 21, 1811. Elio, despite being besieged and in considerable difficulty, managed to block with a royalist naval fleet the port of Buenos Aires and called for help from the Portuguese. A month later, in July, was dispatched from Rio de Janeiro to the south an army of 4,000 men under General Diogo de Sousa. Defeated in Paraguay and Upper Peru, and stopped by the Elio naval blockade, the government of Buenos Aires sought an agreement with Montevideo in exchange for removing the naval blockade and the withdrawal of the Portuguese. The Artiguistas rejected the deal, which left them helpless against the enemy, and followed Artigas in the episode known as the Oriental Exodus. The Portuguese troops had not left the eastern territory until August 1812 when, with the support of the British government, Buenos Aires ensured compliance of the 1811 Armistice Agreement, through the Rademaker-Herrera deal of 1812.

The context of 1816, with the state of war between the Orientals and Buenos Aires (which virtually ensured the neutrality, at least, the neutrality of Buenos Aires to the occupation of the Oriental territory) and the European context, marked by the absolutist restoration that denied the colonies their right to independence from the monarchies (which guaranteed Portugal against any hostile reaction from Spain), proved ideal for the realization of the old goal. Those were the main circumstances.

The ailing Portuguese royal family that had emigrated to Rio de Janeiro in 1808 fleeing from Napoleon's invasion had nothing to do with the proud Court that concerned Britain in 1816 for its expansionist aspirations. Much water had flowed under the bridges and other winds blowing in Europe and America. The endless possibilities of large and rich country of Brazil, economic development produced by the opening of Brazilian ports to international trade-decision of 1808 - and remoteness from European conflicts resulted in a bold idea of the Portuguese political leadership. Convert Brazil to the center of decision and permanent seat of the Kingdom and its authorities. The presence of the Portuguese government in America has substantially changed the geopolitical vision of its leaders. This idea was seriously considered by the King, particularly after the death of his mother, Queen Maria, which occurred in March 1816, who was mentally inhibited from long ago. The Prince Regent finally ascended the throne under the name of John VI. The flamboyant monarch gave his decidedly biased American policy. Brazil seemed to assure the Braganza a first order global destination, which the little Portugal would no longer offer.

A decree almost immediately transformed the Kingdom of Portugal in the United Kingdom of Portugal, Brazil and the Algarves, Brazil was no longer a colony and passed to form the Kingdom of Brazil, an essential part of the Portuguese state. From that moment the expansionist policy was accentuated and the idea of an Empire of Brazil was encouraged and supported. Such a policy did not coincide with the plans of Britain, and was opposed by Lord Strangford, the British ambassador to Portugal who previously had a strong influence on the Portuguese government. The dispute culminated when John VI himself called on London, in April 1815, to replace Lord Strangford, which was done almost immediately. These circumstances did not alter the old dependency of Portugal, and then of Imperial Brazil, on the British. But the end of Lord Strangford's tenure as ambassador allowed John VI to execute his old plan to invade and annex the Banda Oriental. Particular interest in the project, had the planters of Rio Grande do Sul, which on the one hand, aspired to control the overseas port of Montevideo as a way to channel their business (the strong regional and even separatist tendencies in the region had the highest interest in having its own exit that would link to international trade), and on the other hand, were concerned about the implementation of rural artiguista regulation, adopted in September 1815, which established the right of confiscation of the lands of the enemies of the revolution with its disrespect for property rights and the phenomenon of rural populace dividing the land, under the banner "The most unhappy are the most privileged". In addition, under the chaos prevailing in the United Provinces, which declared independence after the Congress of Tucumán, and the "radicalism" of Artigas, he regarded the Banda Oriental as a dangerous center spread of "anarchy" to impulses of the "Montoneros" federalist and republican. No wonder then that the Marquis of Alegrete riograndense warlord, has made maximum efforts for the project, and that those who were later prominent leaders of separatism riograndense, Bento Gonçalves da Silva and Bentos Manuel Ribeiro, have played with it a leading role.

Also, Spanish and American emigrants who sought refuge in Brazil persuaded the Portuguese and Brazilian King John VI, to initiate a military campaign on the Banda Oriental. Gaspar de Vigodet, last Spanish colonial governor of Montevideo and the Spanish friar Cirilo Alameda promoted the adventure with the hope that, once obtained the victory, Portugal would return those territories to Spanish rule. The locals unit exiled by the Fontezuelas Mutiny led by Carlos de Alvear, expected a defeat of Artigas, leader of federalism, and supplied the Portuguese-Brazilian Court with any information, to support their plans. Anti-artiguist orientals (Mateo Magariños, José Batlle and Carreó) also made an important effort in this regard. Particular importance was Nicolas Herrera, former secretary of the government of Alvear deposed in 1815. Herrera arrived in Rio de Janeiro in exile, disgraced and bankrupt, but his undeniable charm and talent enabled him to persuade Antonio de Araujo y Acevedo, Count da Barca, one of the chief advisers of John VI. Soon those responsible for Portuguese-Brazilian politics appreciated the knowledge of the lawyer in respect to geography and political reality of the province to annex.

=== Complicity of Buenos Aires ===
The main drawback of the campaign of conquest lay in the possibility that the United Provinces of the Río de la Plata react in defense of a territory which formed part of the country since its inception. Certainly it was not convenient to Portugal that the annexation of the Banda Oriental resulted in a difficult war, against all the provinces of La Plata. According to Uruguayan historians Washington Reyes Abadie, Oscar H. Bruschera and Tabaré Melogno, and the Argentine Raúl Scalabrini Ortiz, the information about Buenos Aires neutrality was first given by Manuel José García, sent to negotiate with Britain and the court in Rio de Janeiro that they do not support the Spanish Empire, at a time when it was trying to recover the independent colonies.

According to the Uruguayan writer Lincoln Maiztegui Casas, "Garcia with his ideal and interventional unit used all his influence to persuade the Portuguese King that the government of Buenos Aires would not take military action to keep the Oriental territory." Regarding the role of Juan Martín de Pueyrredón, who took office in 1816 as Supreme Director of the United Provinces replacing Alvear, Maiztegui Casas asserts that although he differed from the radical Unitarianism of those who had commissioned Garcia, he thought that the unitarian party was not strong enough to subdue the federal movement, which quickly spread over the provinces; Pueyrredón, same as the previous rulers, was sympathetic to a defeat of Artigas, still considering him an expression of barbarism. Pueyrredón's attitude was ambiguous against the Portuguese invasion, accounting for one side that it implied in Buenos Aires the struggle against federalism and artiguismo in particular, but on the other hand also to a public in Buenos Aires that was strongly opposed to Portuguese control over the territory and the British desire to see the creation of a small independent state in the region. Ultimately, Pueyrredón as supreme director, collaborated with the invasion, not only because he did not declare war on the United Kingdom of Portugal, Brazil and the Algarves to the occupation of part of the country he governed, but because he steadily attacked the provinces of the Federal League, which were inhibited to cooperate with the defense of the territory organized by Artigas. But it also happened after of facts that can not be omitted, including the intransigence of the Protector, Artigas who systematically and firmly refused to recognize the authority of the Supreme Director of the United Provinces of Rio de la Plata, which led him to the conviction that Artigas was intratable. Pueyrredón, expressing a political line that held differences with predominantly Unity Party in Buenos Aires since 1812, and was taken with considerable concern the Portuguese invasion of the Banda Oriental, with no objective reasons to ensure that such attitude was apparent. First, Nicolas de Vedia sent to interview Lecor, leading a trade to ensure that the invasion did not continue to Entre Rios, but that he had instructions to "keep on Buenos Aires strict neutrality". The commissioner returned to Buenos Aires a letter of assurance that would not pass the Portuguese adventure in the Oriental Province, obtained in conversation with Nicolas Herrera. Then Pueyrredón sent some weapons and war supplies to Artigas (low volume, but as a testimony of good will; 300 frames and 100 pounds of gunpowder), issued a loan of 200,000 pesos for military spending and war, a committee responsible for organizing the potential conflict.

== Military planification ==
=== Portuguese preparations ===
The Portuguese army had between 10,000 and 12,000 men, including fully armed and disciplined European veterans of the Napoleonic Wars and local Brazilian troops. An effective intelligence service, which allowed them to determine accurately the main steps of Artigas, and watchful care of every detail, with 30 doctors in the health service. The first transports arrived in Rio de Janeiro, at the end of March next year. The rest of the division made it to the end of March 1816. The division was commanded by General Carlos Frederico Lecor. On May 13, 1816, birthday of the new King, John VI observed with praise and wonder his new invasion troops.

The plan of operations behaved offensively, invading the Banda Oriental and the area of Argentine Mesopotamia. The "Instructions of His Majesty King John VI" to General Lecor, signed by the Marquis de Aguilar, the June 4, 1816 are particularly illustrative for understanding the motives and purposes of the Portuguese action in the Platine territories. With respect to Artigas, he prevented Lecor that although the Portuguese force had strength to beat him, it was advisable to negotiate with him if possible, under the conditions that his military body was dissolved, that he would move to reside in Rio de Janeiro or another place that his Majesty allowed, that he would deliver his weapons, that he would receive a salary similar to the Portuguese infantry colonels and that he would be allowed to sell his possessions and goods. As for his officers and troops, they could be admitted in the Portuguese army, under his discretion.

Finally, it was recommended to keep strict neutrality with the government of Buenos Aires, and in the case of being asked he would deny any intention of moving to the other side of the Rio de la Plata. The day after these Instructions were issued - on June 5, 1816 - John VI appointed Lecor Governor and Captain General of Montevideo.

=== Portuguese forces ===
The preparation of the Lusitanian invasion had already begun in mid-1815. As the Prince Regent had informed the Court of Madrid, the Royal Volunteer Division sent from Lisbon to Brazil, represented the elite corps of the invasion, commanded by Lecor. The British general William Carr Beresford, made Marshal of the Portuguese Army, acted as advisor. The division was composed of two brigades, commanded by Brigadiers Jorge de Avillez Zuzarte and Francisco Homem de Magalhães Pizarro, consisting each of two battalions of Caçadores (light infantry), eight companies, three squadrons of cavalry and an artillery park, a total of 4,831 pieces. This division of Royal Volunteers had 6,000 men in total. Lecor decided to modify the order of operations, despite the detailed instructions, fearing the climate. In Santa Catarina he traded his land troops to Porto Alegre, arranging a new plan with Captain General of Rio Grande, Marquis of Alegrete. According to it, Lecor himself at the head of the Royal Volunteers, marched along the route of the Atlantic coast, in the direction of Maldonado and Montevideo. The Royal Volunteer Division was also called South Column or Lecor Division, and had to be protected and flanked by a naval squadron commanded by Count of Viana.

After the Division of General Bernardo Silveira invaded Cerro Largo, it headed towards Paysandú with the mission to protect the right flank of Lecor with their 2,000 men of the Royal Volunteer Cavalry and 800 riograndense militias. Lieutenant Colonel Abreu, with 650 men would come to reinforce Colonel Chagas in the Eastern Missions, aiming to advance on the Eastern Missions and the Misiones Province. Meanwhile, Jardim ensured the communication between these two commanders and would monitor the native Minuanes and Charrúas in Santa Ana and Haedo. Finally, a large reserve, commanded by Lieutenant General Javier Joaquin Curado stayed at the Ibirapuiá Chico, able to come to the support of any of the other contingents. It consisted of 2,000 men and 11 pieces of artillery.

=== Artigas' Plan ===
Artigas learned in the first half of January 1816 the Lusitanian intentions. He suspected this for several letters he had intercepted. On January 11 he gave instructions to Andres Guazurary, to prevent the entry of the Portuguese into the territory. He also left instructions to withdraw from Candelaria, sending an observation force to Paraguay, to settle in Santo Tomé and watch the movements of Paraguay and Portugal. From there they would be near La Cruz, Yapeyú and other places in danger of being invaded. Similar instructions were sent to the other authorities two days later.

Artigas took many provisions for the upcoming conflict, whose pace was intensified in the following months. Cavalry corps were organized and distributed in the strategic steps guards, and the required weapons and ammunition gunpowder was sent to Purificación.

Artigas had a counter-offensive plan: go up the Uruguay River and invade the populations near the Ibicuí River, taking the war to Brazil, and cutting off the armies from reinforcements. He created as well the military units of "cívicos" and "libertos".

== Battles of the War ==
- Santa Ana (1816)
- Ibiraocaí (1816)
- Carumbé (1816)
- India Muerta (1816)
- Sauce (1816)
- Pablo Perez (1816)
- River Ibicuí (1817)
- Arapey (1817)
- Catalán (1817)
- Apósteles (1817)
- San Carlos (1817)
- Chapicuy (1817)
- Queguay Chico (1817)
- Pando (1818)
- Manga (1818)
- Arroyo Grande (1818)
- Santa María (1819)
- Queguay Chico (1817)
- Tacuarembó (1820)

== Consequences ==
At the end of the Portuguese invasion, over 4000 Uruguayans (6% of the entire population of the Banda Oriental) had been killed by the invaders in three and a half years of bloody war.

The Banda Oriental, now called the Cisplatina Province, became first part of the United Kingdom of Portugal, Brazil and the Algarves and in 1822 of the Empire of Brazil after its independence from Portugal. In 1828, after the Cisplatine War, Uruguay became an independent state.
