= Banda Oriental =

Former Spanish viceroyal region in present-day Uruguay and Brazil

Banda Oriental, the territories on the eastern side of the Uruguay River

The Banda Oriental ('Eastern Bank'), or more fully Banda Oriental del Río Uruguay ('Eastern Bank of the Uruguay River'), was the name of the South American territories east of the Uruguay River and north of Río de la Plata that comprise the modern nation of Uruguay, the modern state of Rio Grande do Sul, Brazil, and part of the modern state of Santa Catarina, Brazil. It was the easternmost territory of the Viceroyalty of the Río de la Plata.

After decades of disputes over the territories, the 1777 First Treaty of San Ildefonso settled the division between the Spanish Empire and the Portuguese Empire: the southern part was to be held by the Spanish Viceroyalty of the Río de la Plata and the northern territories by the Portuguese Capitania de São Pedro do Rio Grande do Sul (English: Captaincy of Saint Peter of the Southern Río Grande).

The Banda Oriental was not a separate administrative unit until the de facto creation of the Provincia Oriental (English: Eastern Province) by José Gervasio Artigas in 1813 and the subsequent decree of the Supreme Director of the United Provinces of the Río de la Plata of 7 March 1814, which formally established the Gobernación Intendencia Oriental del Río de la Plata (English: Governorship-Intendency East of the Río de la Plata), making it a constituent part of the United Provinces of South America.

== Indigenous tribes and the 16th century ==
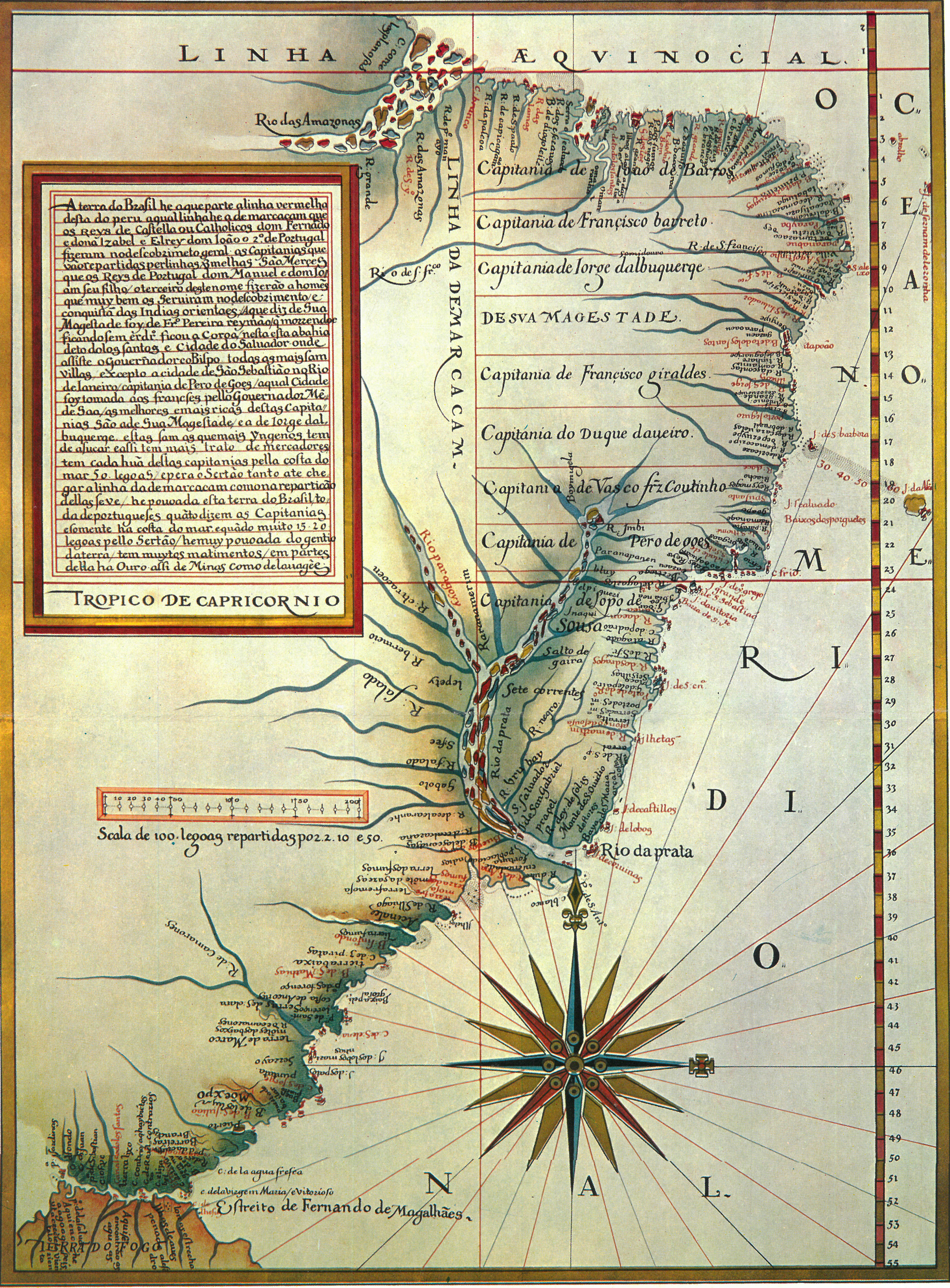
Map of 1574 showing the Portuguese Captaincies

Before the arrival of the Spanish and the Portuguese, several tribes of indigenous people were living in this area as nomads. The principal ones were the Charrúas, the Chanás, the Guayanas and the Guaraníes. Juan Díaz de Solís discovered this territory in 1516. During the conquest of the Río de la Plata area by the "Adelantados" (1535–1590), the main concern was to reach the interior in search of precious metals, so this region remained mostly ignored. The first ephemeral Spanish attempts to start populated centres in this territory happened between 1527 and 1577. These were the Fortín de San Lázaro (actual Carmelo) and the Puerto de San Salvador (1527–1530) by Sebastián Gaboto, the Real de San Juan (1542–1553) and the Real de San Gabriel y Ciudad de San Salvador (1573–1577) by Juan Ortiz de Zárate.

In 1542 the Crown of Castile established the Viceroyalty of Peru, a colonial administrative district that originally contained most of Spanish-ruled South America, governed from the capital of Lima. The Banda Oriental was therefore officially under the administration of the Viceroyalty of Peru from 1542 up to 1776. Although the Treaty of Tordesillas (1494) limited the Portuguese colonies to the east of the 46th meridian, in practice, the Portuguese were free to advance in most of the territory that was not colonized by the Spanish, which included most of the Banda Oriental.

== 17th century ==
In the early 17th century the territory was called Banda Charrúa, later Otra Banda ("other shore"), and then Banda Oriental. Later the name was extended to encompass Entre Ríos, to describe the territories in those latitudes that lead to the Mar del Nord (Atlantic Ocean). The area north of the Banda Oriental was the territory called by the Guaraní word Mbiaza or Ibiazá, rendered in Spanish as La Vera.

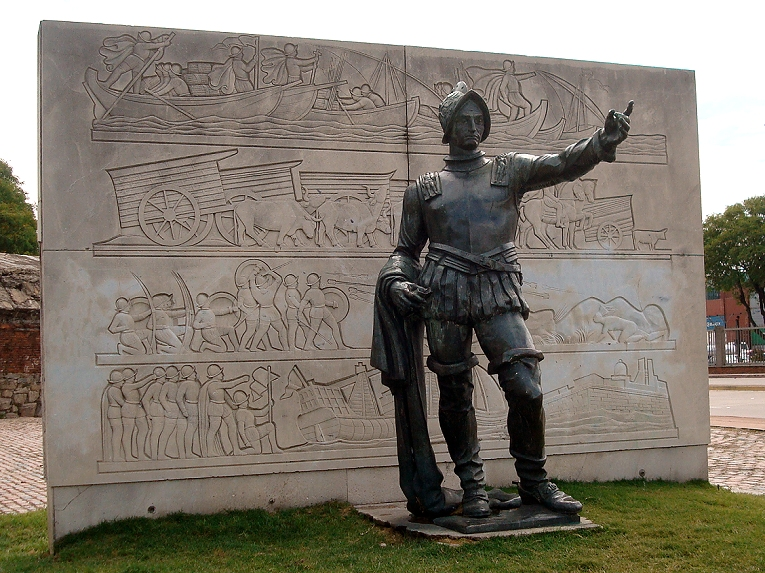
Monument to Hernandarias in Montevideo

In 1618, during the governance of Hernando Arias de Saavedra (commonly known as Hernandarias), the Banda Oriental was integrated into the Spanish colonial Governorate of the Río de la Plata. Following the recommendation of the King of Spain, Hernandarias introduced a large amount of cattle in the Banda Oriental, an act which has played a decisive role in the future of the economy of the area. Starting around 1626, fathers of the Franciscan order attempted to establish reductions south of Río Negro. Some of them were short-lived missions like the San Francisco de los Olivares de los Charrúas, the San Antonio de los Chanáes and the San Juan de Céspedes. In contrast, the one of Santo Domingo Soriano, founded with Charrúas and Chanáes in Entre Ríos, Argentina, in 1664, was moved on the Isle of Vizcaíno, on the mouth of Río Negro and then in 1718 it was moved again at its present location in the modern Soriano Department.

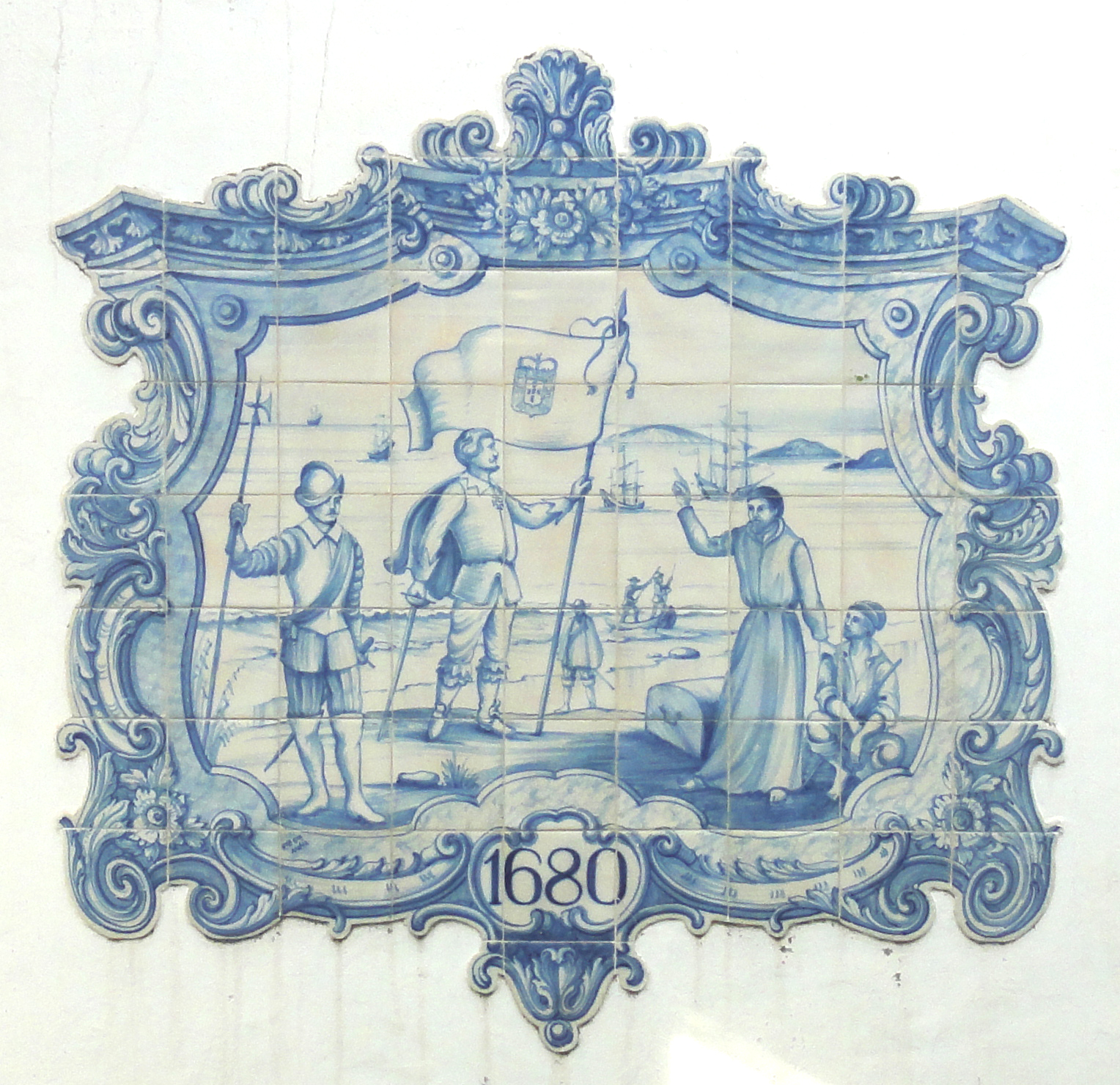
Tile panel depicting the foundation of Colonia del Sacramento in 1680

Another notable development came from the reductions of the Compañía de Jesús further north of the Uruguay River, where indigenous Guaraníes and Tapes were being kidnapped from the missions by the bandeirantes to be used as slaves in São Paulo. To prevent this, in 1631, father Antonio Ruiz de Montoya migrated with 12,000 Guaraníes further east, in the modern State of Paraná of Brazil, while in 1636, father Nicolás del Techo migrated with another 12,000 Tapes towards the modern Rio Grande do Sul, which constituted the north part of the Banda Oriental of the times.

Although Spain claimed the territory of the Banda Oriental, based on the Treaty of Tordesillas, it did not officially belong to the Spanish Crown during the 17th century. The Portuguese, being able to advance without resistance in the sparsely populated territory, founded the city Colonia del Sacramento on the banks of Rio de la Plata, across from Buenos Aires, in 1680. Apart from being seen as evidence that the Portuguese intended to occupy all of the territory, this port in the mouth of the Uruguay River also permitted the Portuguese ships to carry out illegal trade evading Spanish taxation. Spain took the city twice, in 1681 and in 1705, but had to give it back by the Treaty of Utrecht of 1713.

== 18th century ==
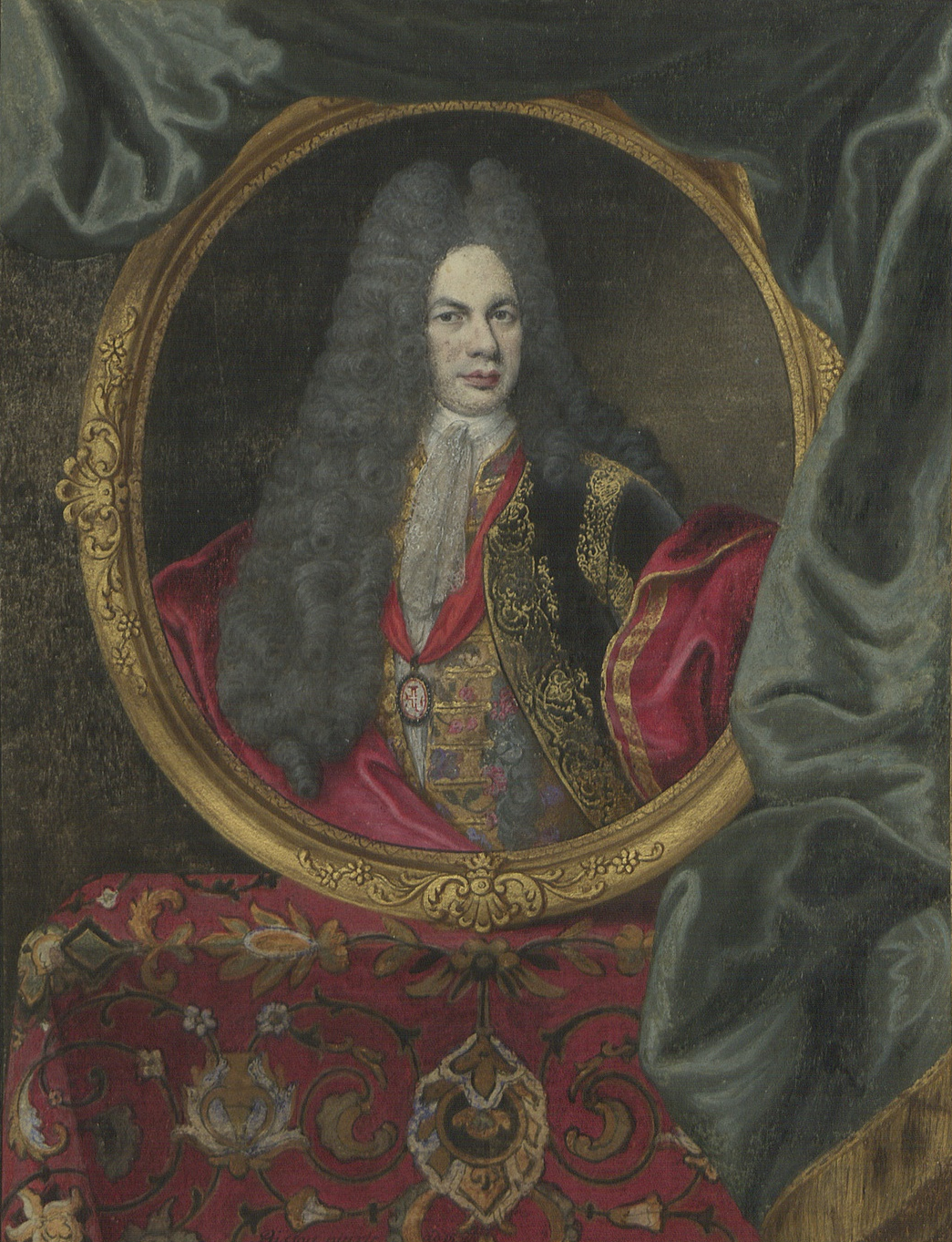
Diplomat Luís da Cunha negotiated the Portuguese Empire's annexation of the Banda Oriental at the Congress of Utrecht in 1713-15.

The following years saw an expansion of the Portuguese settlements around Colonia del Sacramento, until 1723, when Field Marshal Manuel de Freitas da Fonseca of Portugal built the Montevieu fort. As a reaction, on 22 January 1724 a Spanish expedition was sent from Buenos Aires, organized by the Governor of Río de la Plata, Bruno Mauricio de Zabala, who forced the Portuguese to abandon the location and founded and fortified Montevideo. The Spanish started populating the city, initially with six families moving in from Buenos Aires and soon thereafter by families arriving from the Canary Islands who were called by the locals "gauchos" or "canarios".

In this way Montevideo became the center of Spanish control over the Banda Oriental. Its government was carried out by the Cabildo, in which criollos (locally born people of pure or mostly Spanish ancestry) could participate. In 1750, the office of the Governor of Montevideo was created, with jurisdiction in the southern departments of modern Uruguay. The rest of the territories of modern Uruguay, along with part of the modern Brazilian state of Rio Grande do Sul remained under the jurisdiction of the Superintendencia de Buenos Aires, while another part of the territory of the Banda Oriental at the northwest was governed by the authorities of the Missions.

The Portuguese, having lost the possibility of building a fort in Montevideo, established the Fort of San Miguel in 1737 and then the much larger Fortaleza de Santa Teresa in 1762 on the Atlantic coast of the current Rocha Department, in order to keep a route open for their southward advances into the sparsely populated territories of the Banda Oriental.

The Treaty of Madrid (13 January 1750) between the kings of Spain and Portugal, allowed further expansion of the Portuguese Empire west of the 46th meridian. The treaty also stipulated that Spain would receive Colonia del Sacramento and Portugal would receive the Misiones Orientales. This, however, resulted in the Guaraní War (1754–1756), after which the Treaty of El Pardo (1761) repealed all aspects of the previous treaty.

=== Spanish–Portuguese Wars ===
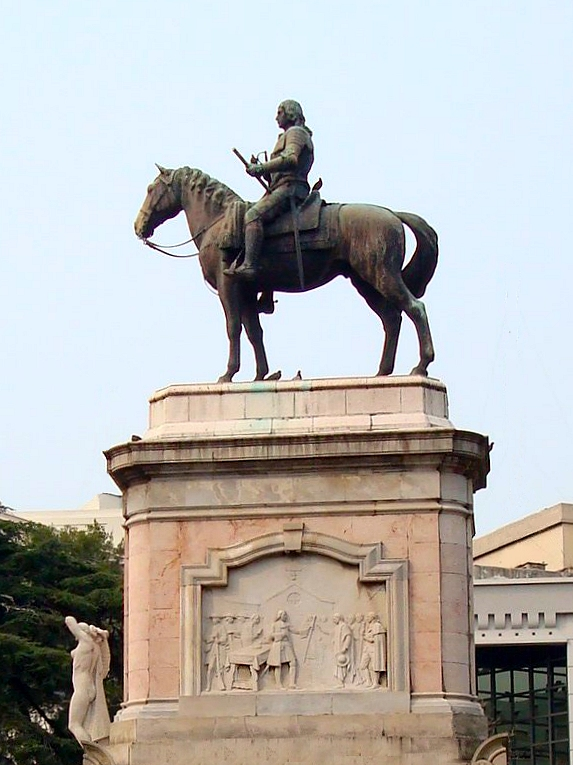
Monument to Bruno Mauricio de Zabala in Montevideo.

The First Cevallos expedition was a military action between September 1762 and April 1763, by the Spanish forces led by Don Pedro Antonio de Cevallos, Governor of Buenos Aires, against the Portuguese in the Banda Oriental as part of the Seven Years' War. The Portuguese territories of Colonia del Sacramento were conquered by the Spanish and the Anglo-Portuguese forces were defeated and forced to surrender and retreat. Colonia del Sacramento and the nearby territories came under Spanish control until the Treaty of Paris (1763), by which all the territory conquered by the first Cevallos expedition was given back to Portugal. Santa Tecla, San Miguel, Santa Teresa and Rio Grande de São Pedro, however, remained in Spanish hands, which became the cause of further Portuguese attacks.

At the conclusion of the Spanish–Portuguese War of 1776-1777, by the First Treaty of San Ildefonso, Spain returned the island of Santa Catarina to Portugal and recognized Rio Grande de São Pedro as Portuguese territory, but kept the Colonia del Sacramento, along with the Banda Oriental, and the Misiones Orientales. In this way the Banda Oriental became integrated into the Viceroyalty of Río de la Plata (1776–1814). The line that separated the Spanish from the Portuguese territories, however, was a sinuous one, lacking any natural formations to define it precisely, and underwent various changes during the next decades.

In 1796, the body of the Blandengues was formed to protect the ranchers and peasants from vagrancy, theft and contraband. The government, lacking resources, offered to pardon any outlaws that would join this body, and they in turn brought also their horses into it.

== 19th century ==
A result of the outbreak of war between Britain and Spain in Europe was the British invasions of the River Plate (1806–1807). The invasions occurred in two phases. A detachment of the British Army occupied Buenos Aires for 46 days in 1806 before being expelled. On 3 February 1807, during the Battle of Montevideo, the British captured the city and occupied it for half a year. They had to abandon it after their defeat in the Second Battle of Buenos Aires and the armistice of 12 August 1807. The sociopolitical effects of the British invasions have been among the causes of the May Revolution of 25 May 1810.

During the British occupation of Montevideo, José Gervasio Artigas, who had joined the body of Blandengues in 1797, organized groups of gauchos and engaged in a guerrilla war against the British. As a result, he was promoted to Captain of the Blandengues by the Spanish in 1809. However, when the Primera Junta was proclaimed in Buenos Aires, Artigas abandoned the ranks of the Spanish and joined the revolution, which promoted him to Colonel. With little help from Buenos Aires, he was sent to organize a rebellion in the Banda Oriental, where Montevideo was now the new capital of the viceroyalty, with Francisco Javier de Elío as the new viceroy.

The Battle of Las Piedras (1811) was the decisive defeat of Elío by land, although he was still keeping Montevideo supported by naval forces. At this point, Elío allied himself with Brazilian forces and requested their intervention in the conflict. Fearing defeat, Buenos Aires signed a truce with Elío, recognizing him as the ruler of the Banda Oriental and half of Entre Ríos. Considering this a treacherous move, Artigas abandoned the blockade over Montevideo and moved to Entre Rios with his supporters.

=== Provincia Oriental (1813–1817) ===
- Second Banda Oriental campaign
- Liga Federal

=== Provincia Cisplatina (1817–1828) ===
The United Kingdom of Portugal, Brazil and the Algarves conquered the southern part in 1817 and renamed it the Província Cisplatina. By the mid-1820s, the Thirty-Three Orientals led a revolution against its successor state (the Brazilian Empire), igniting the Cisplatine War. At its conclusion, in 1828, the former Provincia Oriental was declared an independent state, Uruguay, by the Treaty of Montevideo. Uruguaiana remained with Brazil.

The northern part, between the years of 1836 and 1845, formed a fully independent republic, named as Riograndense Republic. This territory was reconquered by the Brazilian Empire in the Ragamuffin War, and rejoined the empire under the Poncho Verde Treaty. It is today the Brazilian State of Rio Grande do Sul.

== See also ==
- History of Uruguay
