= Federal League (1815–1820) =

Alliance of South American provinces in support of a confederal Argentine state (1815-20)

League of the Free Peoples Liga de los Pueblos Libres (Spanish)
- 1815–1820
- Flag

- Location of the Federal League overlaid with South America modern borders.

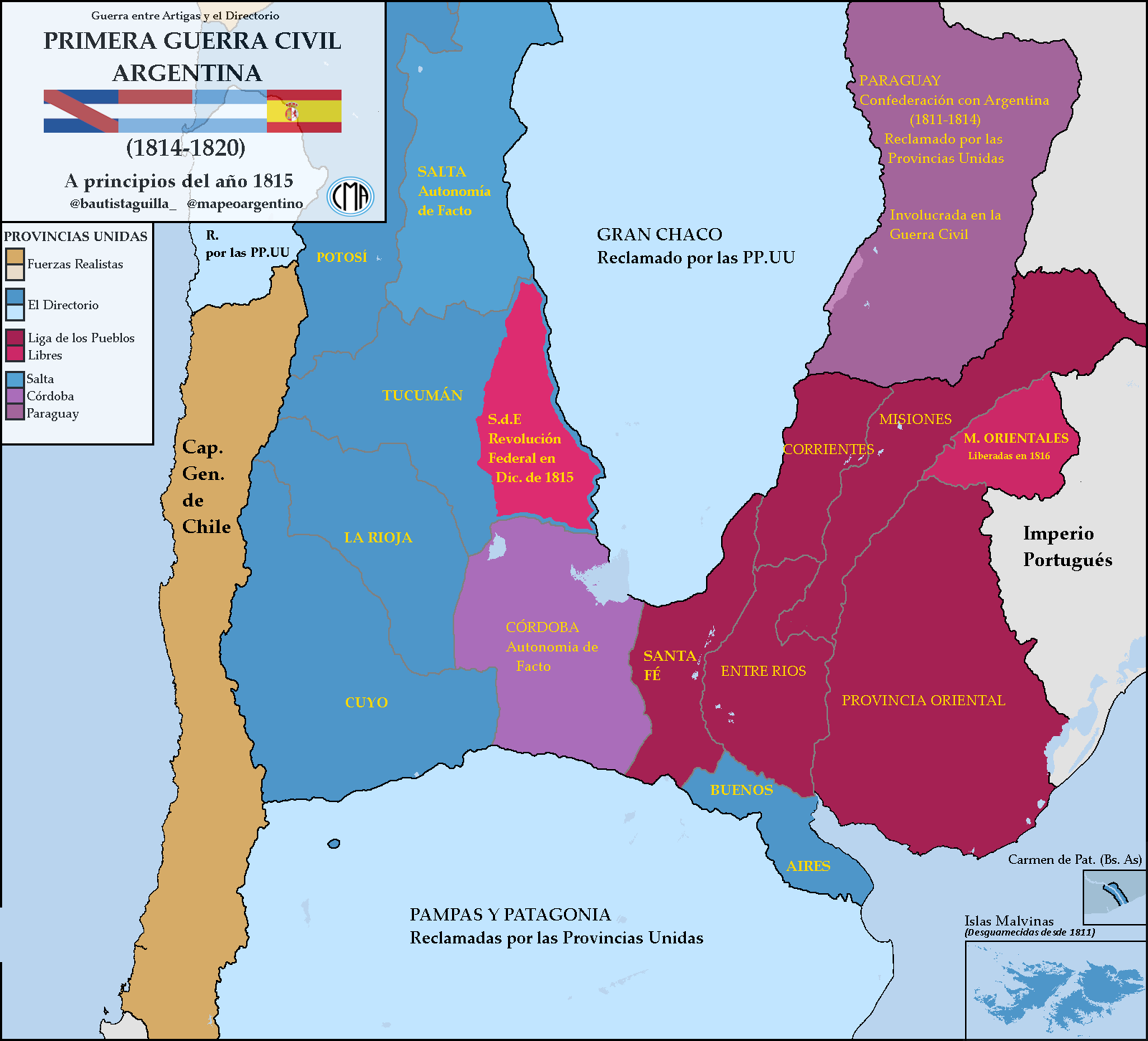
- Political situation of the United Provinces during the First Argentine Civil War. In burgundy the Federal League, and in light blue the United Provinces. Cordoba was loyal both to the United Provinces and the Federal League. Salta was under an autonomous government and did not take part in the conflict.
- Status: Confederation
- Capital: Purificación (provisory), Montevideo
- Common languages: Spanish
- Protector
  - 1815–1820: José Gervasio Artigas
- History
  - Congreso de Oriente: 29 June 1815
  - Treaty of Pilar: 23 February 1820
Preceded by
Viceroyalty of the Río de la Plata
Succeeded by
United Provinces of the Río de la Plata
Cisplatina
Republic of Entre Ríos

The Federal League (Spanish: Liga Federal), also known as the League of the Free Peoples (Liga de los Pueblos Libres), was a short lived confederation of provinces located in South America. From 1815 to 1820 it tried to establish a confederal organization for the State that was emerging from the May Revolution in the war of independence against the Spanish Empire in part of what is now Uruguay, Argentina and Brazil.

Founded and led by José Gervasio Artigas, it proclaimed independence from the Spanish Crown in 1815 and sent provincial delegates to the Congress of Tucumán with instructions regarding the nonnegotiable objective of declaring full independence for the United Provinces of the Río de la Plata and establishing a confederation of provinces, all of them on equal footing and the government of each being directly accountable to its peoples by direct democratic means of government. The delegates from these provinces were rejected on formalities from the Congress that declared the independence of the United Provinces of South America on July 9, 1816.

The Federal League confronted the centralist governments, as well as the interests of the economic and cultural elite of Buenos Aires and Montevideo, in what later amounted to a civil war. In 1820, the federalist governors of Santa Fe and Entre Ríos provinces, Estanislao López and Francisco Ramírez, defeated a diminished Directorial army, ending the centralized government of the United Provinces and establishing a federal agreement with Buenos Aires Province.

The league was dissolved after its constituent provinces rejoined the United Provinces, now under a federal provisional organisation, and after the invasion of the Banda Oriental by the United Kingdom of Portugal, Brazil and the Algarves and the defeat of Artigas. At its largest extent, the League extended over the territories of present-day Uruguay, the southern Brazilian state of Rio Grande do Sul and the Argentine provinces of Entre Ríos, Santa Fe, Corrientes, Misiones and Córdoba. It was instrumental in the Guaraní participation in the revolutionary cause.

Although the country was intended to extend throughout modern-day Argentina, its leadership was based on Purificación and the Eastern Bank of the Uruguay River. Therefore, it is sometimes considered a predecessor state of modern Uruguay.

== History ==
On May 13, 1810, the arrival of a British frigate in Montevideo confirmed the rumors circulating in Buenos Aires: France, led by Emperor Napoleon, had invaded Spain, capturing and overthrowing Ferdinand VII Bourbon, the Spanish King. The situation was clear: with the authority of the vice-regency gone, there was a power vacuum. Leading figures in Buenos Aires quickly arranged a meeting and after much discussion it was decided to replace the Spanish rule with a local Junta.

After the May Revolution, most of the provinces of the former Viceroyalty of the Río de la Plata joined to form the United Provinces of the Río de la Plata, also known as United Provinces of South America in 1810. The four provinces of Upper Peru (current-day Bolivia) were occupied by Spanish Royalist forces and the other ten provinces were under pressure from Royalist forces.

=== José Gervasio Artigas ===
In 1810, Spain moved the headquarters for the Viceroyalty of the River Plate to Montevideo after the May Revolution forced them to abandon Buenos Aires. On February 15, 1811 José Gervasio Artigas left his home of Montevideo and moved to Buenos Aires to offer his military services. The people of Spanish America were fighting for their freedom and Artigas wished to defend these ideals in the Eastern Bank. At the beginning of April he returned to his country with approximately 180 men provided by the Government of Buenos Aires; on April 11, he issued the Mercedes Proclamation, assumed control of the revolution and on May 18 defeated the Spanish in the Battle of Las Piedras. He then began the siege of Montevideo and was acclaimed as The First Chief of the "Orientals" (the first names of current Uruguay being Banda Oriental (Eastern Bank) and later Provincia Oriental (Eastern Province), Uruguayans thus refer to themselves as 'Orientales').

He soon turned against the government of the United Provinces of the Río de la Plata and in 1814 he organized the Unión de los Pueblos Libres (Union of the Free Peoples), of which he was declared Protector. In the following year, as a federalist, he liberated Montevideo from the centralizing control of the "Unitarians" from Buenos Aires, and in 1815 declared the Liga Federal. In this Congress Artigas ratified the use of the flag created by Manuel Belgrano (which would later become the flag of the Argentine Republic), but added a diagonal festoon in red, red being the sign of federalism in Argentina at that time. Original member provinces were the present-day Argentinian provinces of:

- Córdoba (with La Rioja)
- Corrientes
- Entre Ríos
- Misiones
- Eastern Province (Uruguay)
- Santa Fe.

=== Downfall ===
The constant growth of influence and prestige of the Federal League frightened Buenos Aires (due to its federalism) and Portugal (because of its republicanism), and in August, 1816 the latter invaded the Eastern Province with the intention of destroying the protector Artigas and his revolution.

The Portuguese forces, led by Carlos Frederico Lecor, thanks to his numerical and material superiority, conquered the Eastern Province and took Montevideo on January 20, 1817, but the struggle continued for three long years in the countryside. Infuriated by Buenos Aires's passivity, Artigas declared war on the Supreme Directorship at the same time that he faced the Portuguese with armies that were being decimated by successive defeats. Without resources and without suitable men for the struggle, Artigas finally retreated to Entre Ríos Province, across the Uruguay River.

In 1820, governors Francisco Ramírez and Estanislao López, of Entre Ríos and Santa Fe provinces respectively, both members of the Federal League, managed to end victorious the struggle against the centralism of Buenos Aires, defeating a diminished Supreme Directorship army at the Battle of Cepeda and signing a federal agreement with Buenos Aires Province. As these Provinces, and Corrientes Province, rejoined the United Provinces of the Río de la Plata, the Federal League effectively came to an end as a separate political entity.

The Treaty of Pilar resulted unacceptable to Artigas so he ordered Ramírez and López to renounce it, but they disobeyed. Because of this, Artigas entered into conflict with his former ally Governor Francisco Ramírez, who defeated the remnants of Artigas' army. Artigas withdrew to Paraguay, where he settled as an exile until his death. The Eastern Province was annexed by Portugal to its Brazilian dependences in 1821.

== See also ==
- Instructions of the Year XIII
