= Second Banda Oriental campaign =

1812–14 Argentine War of Independence campaign

- Part of Argentine War of Independence
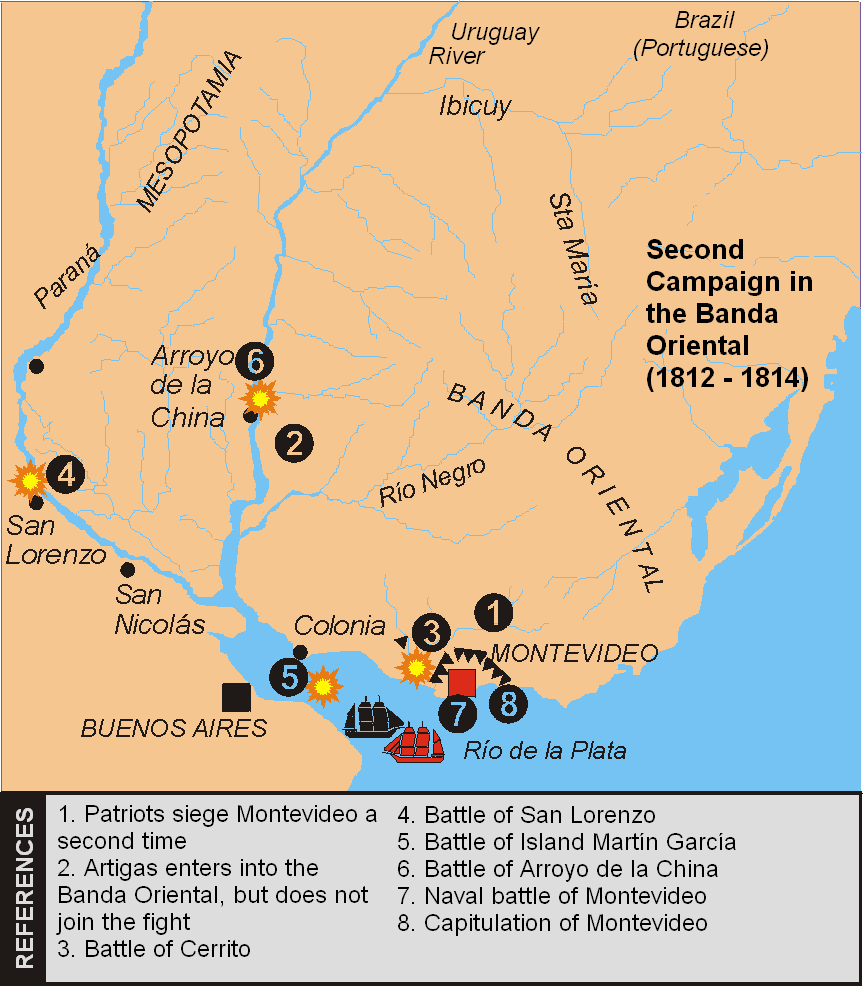
Date	1812–1814
Location	Banda Oriental
Result	United Provinces victory: End of royalist resistance; Complete disappearance of the Viceroyalty of the Río de la Plata

Belligerents
United Provinces of the Río de la Plata	Viceroyalty of the Río de la Plata

Commanders and leaders
William Brown; José de San Martín; José Rondeau; José G. Artigas	Jacinto de Romarate; Gaspar de Vigodet; Antonio Zabala

The Second Banda Oriental campaign was a military campaign of the Argentine War of Independence, that besieged and captured the Banda Oriental (present-day Uruguay) with joint operations against Montevideo by José Rondeau on land and William Brown on water.

== Background ==
The first campaign against the Banda Oriental ended with a peace treaty negotiated between the First Triumvirate of Buenos Aires and Javier de Elío of Montevideo. Buenos Aires had a weak military outlook after the defeat of the Paraguay campaign and the First Upper Peru campaign. Elío feared that the reinforcements he requested from the United Kingdom of Portugal, Brazil and the Algarves would actually attempt to invade the Banda Oriental instead of reinforcing him. José Gervasio Artigas felt betrayed by the Triumvirate, and led his people out of the zone during the Oriental exodus. The troops from Buenos Aires left as well, leaving Elío alone against the Portuguese. The Portuguese military left after the intervention of the British Lord Strangford.

Hostilities were renewed shortly afterwards, when the Triumvirate failed to take action against José Gervasio Artigas and demanded the departure of the Portuguese armies called by Elío. When they were gone, Buenos Aires renewed hostilities against the Banda Oriental, but Artigas did not take part in the military action. Manuel de Sarratea had declared him a traitor. However, the Revolution of October 8, 1812 deposed the Triumvirate and replaced it with the Second Triumvirate. The new governors replaced Sarratea with the Oriental José Rondeau, who had good relations with Artigas. Artigas joined the siege of Montevideo and sent deputies to the Assembly of the Year XIII. When those deputies were rejected, Artigas left the siege.

== Military Conflict ==
Manuel de Sarratea led an army to the Banda Oriental, but he was soon replaced by José Rondeau, who began the siege of Montevideo. Gaspar de Vigodet sought to break the siege, but he was defeated by Rondeau at the Battle of Cerrito. The Montevidean navy sought to evade the land blockade by raiding nearby populations, but the attempt to raid San Lorenzo led to a defeat at the hands of José de San Martín during the Battle of San Lorenzo.

The land blockade would be useless unless the Montevidean navy was defeated as well. Juan Larrea bought several ships and organized a navy, led by the Irish William Brown. The Battle of Martín García secured strategic Martín García Island. Brown sent Tomás Nother to pursue the remaining ships across the Uruguay River, but he was defeated at the Battle of Arroyo de la China. Jacinto de Romarate had more military resources than expected, which allowed his victory, but the source of the resources is unclear. The royalist victory did not have consequences over the campaign. The navy set a naval blockade to Montevideo, and the battle of Buceo was the final royalist defeat in the campaign. Carlos María de Alvear seized the city on June 23, 1814, ending the royalist presence in the Banda Oriental.

== Bibliography ==
- Camogli, Pablo; Luciano de Privitellio (2005). Batallas por la Libertad. Buenos Aires: Aguilar. ISBN 987-04-0105-8.
- Ratto, Héctor (1999). Historia del Almirante Brown. Buenos Aires: Instituto de Publicaciones Navales. ISBN 950-9016-49-7.
