= Battle of Cerrito =

- Part of the Second Banda Oriental campaign
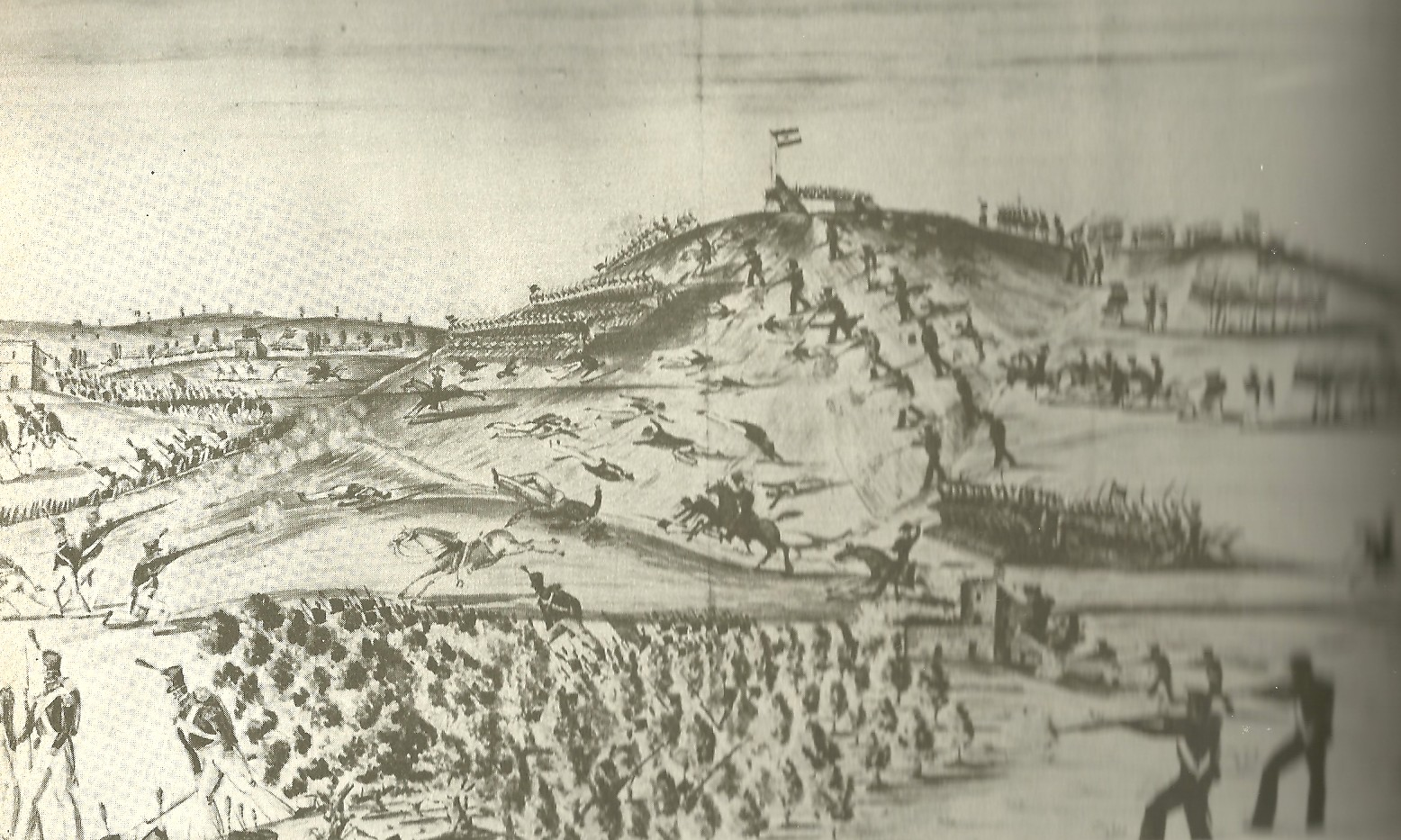
- Drawing of the battle by a direct witness
Date	31 December 1812
Location	Montevideo 34°51′12″S 56°10′13″W
Result	United Provinces victory

Belligerents
United Provinces of the Río de la Plata	Viceroyalty of the Río de la Plata

Commanders and leaders
José Rondeau	Gaspar de Vigodet

Strength
1,000 soldiers 2 artillery	2,000 infantry 300 cavalry 8 guns

Casualties and losses
90 killed 40 captured 1 gun lost	100 killed 146 wounded 30 captured

The Battle of Cerrito (outskirts of Montevideo, 31 December 1812), was a battle for the War of Independence of the Viceroyalty of the Río de la Plata, between the royalist forces who had control of the city of Montevideo and the rebel forces of the government of Buenos Aires.

== Context ==
In the year 1811, the forces deployed by the Junta Grande of Buenos Aires and the gaucho forces led by José Artigas had started a siege to the city of Montevideo, which had refused to obey the directives of the new authorities after the May Revolution. The siege had been lifted at the end of that year, when the military situation started to deteriorate in the Upper Peru.

The change of power in Buenos Aires to the Second Triumvirate, pushed by the change in the situation in the North front allowed them to restart the siege by October 1812 by the rebel forces, commanded by José Rondeau. There was a second army force by the Uruguay River under the command of Domingo French, besides Artigas's militias, who had not yet joined the siege due to disagreements with the political leader of the rebels, Manuel de Sarratea. The siege army took over the city of Colonia del Sacramento the last step to complete the siege of Montevideo.

The royalist forces were numerically superior to the siege army, but their fidelity to the cause they were defending was doubtful. The siege army was also low in munitions and armament and lacked reinforcements. Knowing that fact, Spanish general Gaspar de Vigodet decided to effect a massive breakout to confront the enemy, but he had bad timing as just the night before the attack, Rondeau received reinforcements and supplies.

== Battle ==
On the morning of 31 December, Vigodet and brigadier Vicente Muesas attacked with 2,300 men and 8 cannon. Rondeau, who only had 1,000 men and two cannon, had taken a high position on the hill known as Cerrito (low hill in Spanish). Muesas attacked there, displacing regiment number 6, under lieutenant colonel Miguel Estanislao Soler, dislodging the rebels from the hill. Next another infantry corps, regiment number 4, under the command of Ventura Vázquez, established a precarious hold on the position.

Soler gathered his soldiers, composed almost exclusively of freed slaves, and counter-attacked uphill. This surprise attack paralysed the royalists, and brigadier Muesas was shot to death, causing great confusion among his men. The royalists were dislodged from the hill and while running downhill, they were attacked by the rebel cavalry under Rafael Hortiguera, completing the rout and the enemy's retreat.

== Consequences ==
The royalists lost 100 men, 146 wounded and 30 prisoners, to the rebel 90 dead, 40 prisoners and one cannon lost but they were left demoralized by the defeat at the battle, and they did not attempt any other breakout from the city walls, not even a year later when Artigas abandoned the siege for a serious political disagreement with the government of Buenos Aires, leaving part of the site undefended, they dared attack Rondeau again.

The victory at Cerrito was a defining point for the future operations on land. The city of Montevideo, still held strong, supplied via the Río de la Plata with food and reinforcements. This situation lasted until 17 May 1814, with the naval victories of Admiral William Brown, which forced Vigodet to surrender to an army marginally bigger than the one Rondeau had.

Rondeau was promoted to general, and later given command of the Army of the North, and two times the post of Supreme Director of the United Provinces of the Río de la Plata. Soler was promoted to colonel and later would reach the rank of general. Vázquez was promoted to colonel, and commander Hortiguera to lieutenant colonel, reaching the rank of colonel later.

== Bibliography ==
- Camogli, Pablo (2005). Batallas por la libertad. Buenos Aires: Editorial Aguilar.
- Ruiz Moreno, Isidoro J. (2004–2006). Campañas militares argentinas. Buenos Aires: Editorial Emecé.
- Beretta Curi, Alcides. Montevideo, la ciudad realista. Buenos Aires: Todo es Historia Magazine.
- Arteaga, Juan José; Coolighan Sanguinetti, María Luisa (1992). Historia del Uruguay. Montevideo: Editorial Barreiro y Ramos.
- Giberti, Hugo A. (2001). Buenos Aires. Calles conocidas, soldados olvidados. Buenos Aires: Editorial Edivérn.
- Segreti, Carlos S. A. (1980). La aurora de la Independencia. Buenos Aires: Editorial La Bastilla.
