= La Reconquista de Buenos Aires =

1909 painting by Charles Fouqueray

La Reconquista de Buenos Aires (1909) by Charles Fouqueray

La Reconquista de Buenos Aires (Spanish: The Reconquest of Buenos Aires) is an Argentine historical painting by Charles Fouqueray in 1909. It depicts the victory of Santiago de Liniers against William Carr Beresford during the first of the British invasions of the River Plate, and the subsequent recapture of Buenos Aires from the British. It was made in the proximity of the Argentina Centennial.

== Creation ==
The painting, as well as "La Defensa de Buenos Aires", were requested to the French artist Charles Fouqueray in 1906, by Ángel Estrada. The portrait was done outside of the network of portrait productions managed by the National Historical Museum in the proximity of the Argentina Centennial. The director of it, Adolfo Carranza, considered that the history of Argentina started during the May Revolution and that the previous events were not part of it, and that Santiago de Liniers should not be homaged because of being an enemy of it, when he led an ill-fated counter-revolution against the Primera Junta that took government after it. Carranza had also conflictive relations with Bartolomé Mitre, who created the commission in 1896.

As a result, there was little artistic productions related with the British invasions of the River Plate, in comparison with the Argentine War of Independence. Even more, Britain was a strong ally of Argentina during that time. The picture, however, was not intended to represent hostility towards Britain, but rather a triumph of the Spanish armies.

The portrait was held at the Casa Rosada, later moved to a wing of the National Historical Museum, and, as of 2012, it is held at the Buenos Aires Cabildo.

== Description ==
The portrait has the traditional French style of military historical portraits made during the 19th century. It was done with a strong dramatic style. Diego de la Bragaña lies dead in the floor at the bottom center of the portrait, the people help injured ones at the right side, and most of them wear bandages. In the center of the portrait, William Carr Beresford, leader of the British forces, surrenders to Santiago de Liniers, leader of the Spanish ones. In the scene depicted, Beresford offers his sword to the victorious general, which Liniers gently refuses.
