= Siege of Montevideo (1811) =

1811 siege

- Part of the Argentine War of Independence
Date	21 May 1811 – 12 October 1811
Location	Montevideo, Banda Oriental (present-day Uruguay
Result	Inconclusive

Belligerents
United Provinces	(Spain) Spanish Empire

Commanders and leaders
José Rondeau; Miguel Estanislao Soler; José Gervasio Artigas	Francisco Javier de Elío; Joaquín de Soria; Jacinto de Romarate

Strength
At the beginning: 4,360–6,076	At the beginning: 1,270; 6 guns

The first siege of Montevideo (Spanish: primer sitio de Montevideo) took place between May and October 1811, when the troops of the United Provinces of the Río de la Plata unsuccessfully besieged the city of Montevideo, still held by Spanish loyalists.

In 1810, the May Revolution had forced the Spanish to abandon Buenos Aires, but they held on to the Banda Oriental (present-day Uruguay), as Francisco Javier de Elío moved the headquarters of his Viceroyalty of the Río de la Plata to Montevideo. In May 1811, the revolutionary José Gervasio Artigas defeated the Spanish in the Banda Oriental at the Battle of Las Piedras. After the battle, the Royalists only remained in control of two cities: Colonia del Sacramento and Montevideo, which was besieged by Artigas and José Rondeau.

Montevideo had formidable fortifications and the Spanish controlled the Río de la Plata river. When a Portuguese relief army entered the Banda Oriental at the request of Spain, the United Provinces signed a truce with Elío, recognizing him as the ruler of the Banda Oriental. Artigas felt the truce to be treasonous. He broke relations with Buenos Aires, and lifted the blockade over Montevideo in October 1811.

The city would finally be conquered by Artigas and Rondeau in 1814 after the second Siege of Montevideo.

== See also ==
- Dissolution of the Viceroyalty of the Río de la Plata
- Juan José Quesada, Argentinian participant
