= Miguel Soler =

Miguel Soler may refer to:

- Miguel Soler (gymnast) (born 1960), Spanish gymnast
- Miguel Soler (educator) (1922–2021), Uruguayan educational theorist
- Miguel Estanislao Soler (1783–1849), Argentine general

== See also ==
- Miquel Soler (born 1965), Spanish footballer and manager
