= Miguel de Irigoyen =

Argentine soldier and police chief

Miguel Remigio de Irigoyen
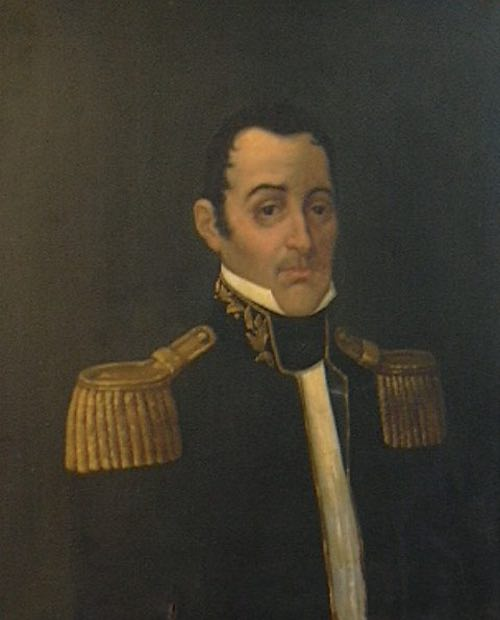

1st Governor of Buenos Aires Province
- In office 11 February 1820 – 18 February 1820
- Preceded by: himself as governor intendant of Buenos Aires
- Succeeded by: Manuel de Sarratea

Member of the Governing Commission
- In office 11 July 1816 – 29 July 1816 Serving with Antonio de Escalada

Personal details
- Born: Miguel Remigio de Irigoyen de la Quintana Riglos; 2 October 1764 Buenos Aires
- Died: 11 June 1822 (aged 57) Buenos Aires
- Occupation: Military officer; politician

Miguel Remigio de Irigoyen (2 October 1764 – 11 June 1822) was an Argentine soldier, interim governor of Buenos Aires, and police chief during the period when Argentina was gaining independence from Spain.

== Family ==
Miguel Remigio de Irigoyen de la Quintana Riglos was born on 2 October 1764 in Buenos Aires. His paternal grandfather was Juan Martín de Irigoyen, born in Azpilkueta in Baztan, Navarre on 3 September 1689, deputy in Elizondo, Navarre, in 1734. Miguel's father was Ignacio Irigoyen Echenique, born in Azpilkueta on 11 March 1728, who held various civic offices in Buenos Aires including being mayor in 1763 and 1776. He died in Buenos Aires on 22 February 1784. His mother was Francisca de la Quintana Riglos, born in Buenos Aires on 26 September 1734. Her parents were Nicolás de la Quintana y Echevarría, born in Bilbao on 24 September 1693, and Leocadia de Riglos y Gaeta, born in Buenos Aires on 29 June 1710.

Miguel was the second of 13 children. His older brother was Juan Antonio Mariano Francisco Irigoyen de la Quintana (7 June 1761 – 4 May 1815). Younger siblings included Basilio Ignacio Irigoyen de la Quintana (14 June 1772 – 15 October 1833), María Petrona Irigoyen de la Quintana (19 October 1778 – 1829) and Matías Ramón de Irigoyen de la Quintana (25 February 1781 – 20 September 1839). On 22 December 1809 he married Ana Estefanía Dominga Riglos. They had no children.

== Career ==
Miguel de Irigoyen joined the army as a guard of the dragoons (portaguión de dragones) in 1789. As a lieutenant of the Dragoons Regiment of Buenos Aires, he was made a knight of the Order of Alcántara in Buenos Aires in 1794. By 1807 he was a captain in the cavalry. He fought during the British invasions of the River Plate (1806–07), and was sent to Spain with Juan Martín de Pueyrredón and Manuel José Obarrio Fernández to report on the events in Buenos Aires. He rose to the rank of lieutenant colonel.

Miguel de Irigoyen attended the open Cabildo on 22 May 1810 and voted for Cornelio Saavedra's proposal. He was appointed a police judge (juez de policía) when that position was created in 1811, a title that was changed to police superintendent (intendente de policía) in 1812. From 11 to 29 July 1816 Miguel Remigio de Irigoyen and Francisco Antonio de Escalada formed the Interim Governing Commission of the State pending the arrival of Juan Martín Mariano de Pueyrredón y O'Dogan as Supreme Director. In 1818 he was exiled to the guard of the Monte after forming a faction with Manuel de Sarratea and Juan Pedro Aguirre. He was again appointed general police superintendent (intendente general de policía) on 1 February 1820. In 1821 he was elected a member of the board protecting the freedom of the press.

Miguel de Irigoyen died on 11 June 1822 in Buenos Aires. He is buried in the La Recoleta Cemetery in Buenos Aires.

== Sources ==
- "Argentina: Supreme Directors: 1814-1820", Archontology.org, 20 December 2015
- Biografías de Presidentes * Miguel de Irigoyen (in Spanish), Tribunal Electoral Permanente de la Provincia de Jujuy
- Cadenas y Vicent, Vicente de (1992), Caballeros de la Orden de Alcántara que efectuaron sus pruebas de ingreso durante el siglo XVIII (in Spanish), Ediciones Hidalguia, ISBN 978-84-87204-42-5
- García López, Ana Belén (2016-11-07), Las heroínas silenciadas en las independencias hispanoamericanas (in Spanish), Megustaescribirlibros, ISBN 978-84-9112-679-9
- Ibarguren, Carlos F., "Miguel Remigio Irigoyen de la Quintana", genealogiafamiliar (in Spanish)
- "Ignacio Irigoyen Echenique", Genealogía Familiar (in Spanish)
- Piccirilli, Ricardo; Romay, Francisco L.; Gianello, Leoncio (2 August 1954). "IRIGOYEN, Miguel de". Diccionario Histórico Argentino (in Spanish). Vol. IV. Avellaneda: Ediciones Históricas Argentinas.
