= Santiago de Liniers, 1st Count of Buenos Aires =

18/19th-century French soldier in service of Spain; colonial official in New Spain

The Most Illustrious The Count of Buenos Aires KOM OM
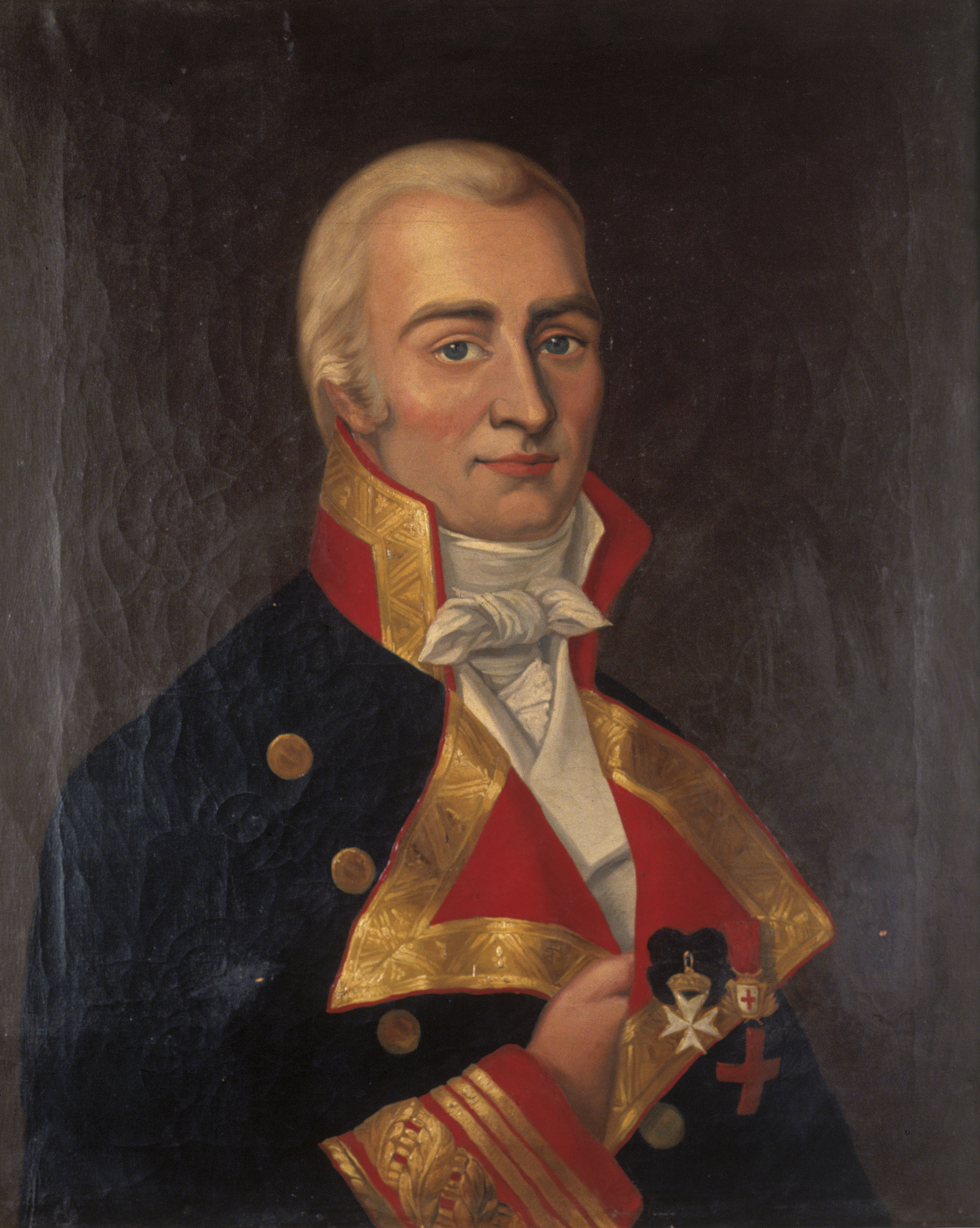
- Portrait of Liniers, Naval Museum of Madrid

10th Viceroy of the Río de la Plata
- In office February 10, 1807 – June 30, 1809
- Monarch: Charles IV of Spain – Junta of Seville
- Preceded by: Rafael de Sobremonte
- Succeeded by: Baltasar Hidalgo de Cisneros

I Conde de Buenos Aires
- In office May 15, 1809 – June 26, 1810
- Preceded by: Title granted by Fernando VII
- Succeeded by: Luis de Liniers and Membielle

Personal details
- Born: Jacques de Liniers; July 25, 1753 Niort, France
- Died: August 26, 1810 (aged 57) Cabeza de Tigre, United Provinces of the Río de la Plata
- Party: Royalist
- Spouse(s): Martina de Sarratea (1772–1805), elder sister of Manuel de Sarratea
- Domestic partner(s): Ana Perichon between 1806 and 1808
- Occupation: Naval officer

Military service
- Allegiance: Spain
- Battles/wars: Spanish–Portuguese War; American Revolutionary War; Spanish–Algerian War; Bombardment of Algiers; British invasions of the River Plate; Liniers Counter-revolution

Santiago Antonio María de Liniers y Bremond, 1st Count of Buenos Aires, KOM, OM (July 25, 1753 – August 26, 1810) was a Spanish military officer and a viceroy of the Viceroyalty of the Río de la Plata. Although born Jacques de Liniers in France, he is more widely known by the Spanish form of his name.

He was popularly regarded as the hero of the reconquest of Buenos Aires after the first British invasion of the River Plate. As a result of his success, he was appointed as viceroy, replacing Rafael de Sobremonte. It was unprecedented for a viceroy to be replaced without the King's direct intervention. But he was confirmed in office by Charles IV of Spain.

He defended the settlement against a second British invasion and a mutiny that sought to replace him. He was replaced in 1809 by Baltasar Hidalgo de Cisneros, appointed as viceroy by the Junta of Seville, and retired from public activity. But when the May Revolution took place, Liniers decided to come out of his retirement and organized a monarchist uprising in Córdoba. Liniers was forced to flee, but was eventually captured and executed without trial.

Coat of Arms of Santiago de Liniers Count of Buenos Aires X Viceroy of the Río de la Plata

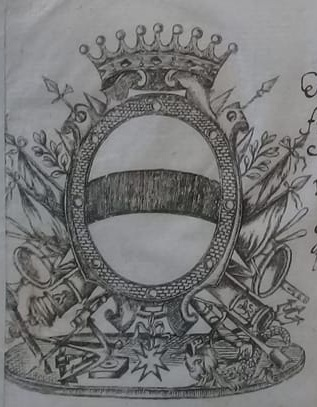
Original coat of arms 1809 of D. Santiago de Liniers y Bremond. Knight of the Order of Saint John. Commander of Ares del Maestre in the Order of Montesa, Squadron Commander of the Royal Navy. Viceroy, Governor and Acting Captain General of the Provinces of the Río de la Plata and their Dependencies. President of the Royal Audiencia of Buenos Aires. Superintendent General. Subdelegate of the Royal Treasury, Tobacco and Playing Card Revenues, Mines, Commander General of the Naval Station.

== Early life ==
Santiago de Liniers y Bremond, Chevalier of the Order of Saint John, Caballero of the Order of Montesa, and Captain in the Spanish Royal Navy was born in Niort, Poitou, France, as Jacques, 4th son of Jacques Joseph Louis, comte de Liniers (1723–1785) and Captain in the French Royal Navy, and Henriette Thérèse de Brémond d'Ars (1725–1770).

The Liniers family had been part of the French nobility since the 11th century. One of their ancestors, Guillaume de Liniers, was killed at the Battle of Poitiers, during the Hundred Years' War. Eight other members were professed knights of the Order of Saint John.

In 1765, when Jacques was 12 years old, he entered the military academy of the Order of St. John. (As a younger son who was unlikely to inherit the title or the estates, Liniers was sent to their school in order to train for a military career.) After three years, he graduated with the Cross of Chevalier (1768). He was commissioned as a Sub-Lieutenant of Cavalry in the Royal-Piémont Regiment in the French Royal Army.

== Serving the Spanish Crown ==
In 1774 Liniers requested dismissal and re-enlisted as a volunteer in the campaigns against the Moors in Algiers. He benefited from the third Pacte de Famille (1761), which allowed Frenchmen to take part in Spanish military campaigns with equal rights and requirements as the Spaniards. At the campaign's conclusion, Liniers took an exam as a Midshipman in Cádiz, to serve as a volunteer for the Spanish Crown. In 1775 he earned the rank of Ensign in the Spanish Navy.

In 1776, under the orders of Pedro de Cevallos, Liniers sailed to the Viceroyalty of the Río de la Plata and took part on the occupation of Santa Catarina Island in Portuguese Brazil and the attack on Colonia del Sacramento (modern day Uruguay).

In 1779, Liniers was an officer on the San Vicente. Spain joined the Franco-American alliance in the American Revolutionary War as a renewal of the Bourbon Family Compact. The San Vicente was part of the Spanish-French naval squadron fighting against the Royal Navy in South America.

Liniers distinguished himself during the American Revolution. In 1780, with a few sloops, he captured a three-masted ship of 24 guns. In 1782, he distinguished himself particularly in the siege of Port Mahon: under fire, he moved to where two British ships had collided, which were laden with arms and ammunition. He captured the ships and conveyed them to the Spanish lines. He was promoted to Frigate Captain.

A few months later Liniers took part in a new expedition, this time against the city of Algiers, in North Africa, which was the main base of the Barbary corsairs, with the aim of forcing them to stop piracy and the Barbary slave trade. As the campaign did not go well for the Spanish navy, Madrid tried to negotiate instead. Liniers was entrusted with this mission. The king of Tripoli was delighted with Liniers, and agreed to free several European prisoners. The Barbary pirates associated with North Africa had long been attacking European shipping in the Mediterranean, and had taken numerous prisoners over the years.

The Spanish court rewarded Liniers for this diplomatic success, promoting him to the rank of captain and entrusting him with the command of the Río de la Plata in 1788 to organize a flotilla of gunships. Liniers took with him his son Luis and his first wife, Juana de Menviel, whom he had married in Málaga. She died two years later in 1790. Liniers married again, this time in Buenos Aires, to María Martina Sarratea, daughter of one of the richest merchants of Buenos Aires.

== First British Invasion ==
William Carr Beresford (right) surrenders to Santiago de Liniers (centre left) during the British invasions of the River Plate; painting by Charles Fouqueray.

The Napoleonic Wars expanded to South America. Britain gained naval supremacy over France with its victory at the battle of Trafalgar. France attacked Britain economically by imposing the Continental System, locking the continent to British trade. Needing new markets, Britain invaded Buenos Aires and Montevideo, two Spanish colonies in South America (Spain was allied to France in the war). Home Riggs Popham attempted to invade Buenos Aires, without official orders.

June 23, 1806, a British expeditionary force of 1,700 men landed on the left bank of the Río de la Plata and invaded Buenos Aires, which had been abandoned by the Viceroy. Liniers remained in the city in disguise, staying in the Dominican convent. At the altar of the Virgin, he vowed to return with the colours (flags) of the British. He escaped to Montevideo and, with the help of its governor Pascual Ruiz Huidobro, galvanized the people, raising a force of 1,200 volunteers.

He embarked with this liberation army on a few schooners, which joined a French privateer corvette. Landing on August 4, Liniers and his men rushed across the marshes to Buenos Aires. The city was recovered after fierce street fighting that ended with the storming of the cathedral, which had been fortified by the British. British General William Carr Beresford capitulated and offered his sword; true to Liniers's vow, British colours (those of the Highlanders regiment and Green St. Helena) were transferred to the church of the convent of the Dominicans, where they are still held.

== Designation as viceroy ==
After the victory, the society stayed on military alert, suspecting that the British might counterattack. The Buenos Aires Cabildo called an open cabildo to discuss the next steps, including the actions to take regarding viceroy Sobremonte. They decided to prevent the viceroy from returning to the city, and appoint Liniers, who was regarded as a hero, as commander-in-chief. Sobremonte accepted, and moved to Montevideo. Liniers drafted all the male population capable of bearing arms, including African slaves, into the defense of the city. He arranged for each regiment to vote for its officers. All the lead in the city was confiscated (even pipes and cutlery) to be melted into ordnance. The Cabildo requested other cities to lend gunpowder, and the horses were trained to ignore the noise of cannon shots.

A new British task force, much larger than the first one, arrived the next year. It was led by Samuel Auchmuty, later replaced by John Whitelocke. This time they attacked Montevideo, which fell under their domination. The Real Audiencia of Buenos Aires decided to depose Sobremonte from his role as viceroy, confirmed Liniers as commander-in-chief, and appointed him as interim viceroy. It was an unprecedented action.

== Second British Invasion ==
Once the Banda Oriental had been secured, the British prepared the attack on Buenos Aires. They were aware that the city was prepared for the invasion, but their forces were greater than in the first one, 23 ships and 11,000 soldiers. John Whitelocke, leader of the British forces, moved to Buenos Aires next to the river. Liniers left the city to battle him, being defeated, but managed to retreat and return to Buenos Aires. Álzaga, assuming that Liniers had died, put his defense plans in motion, and the morale of the troops rose when Liniers returned alive. The British forced an entry into the city and encountered strong resistance, with many British battalions eventually being overwhelmed, while others tried to resist at strategic points. Whitelocke suggested a truce, which was rejected by Liniers, who also attacked the British ships within cannon range. Whitelocke's defeat was complete, and Liniers demanded that all British forces be removed from the territories of Viceroyalty, including the Banda Oriental, in no more than 2 months, as well as an exchange of prisoners. Whitelocke accepted the conditions and surrendered.

== Government ==
There was a large number of celebrations after the victory against the British. Liniers was officially appointed as viceroy in May 1808, and awarded the title of "Count of Buenos Aires". However, this victory of the Argentine people which was obtained without any military help from Spain led to a new political situation in which some will for independence started to emerge. In this configuration Liniers, who appeared to be a fantastic leader during the emergency crisis, began to be criticized by the different parties including the conservative members of the Cabildo, led by Álzaga.

On one side, Spanish leaders criticized the new power of the Argentine people issued from the formation of criollo armies, and thought that Spanish influence was in danger. On the opposite side, criollo people who were asking for more independence, had some difficulty understanding the perfect sense of loyalty of a navy officer issued from old French nobility who intended to respect his oath to the king of Spain.

In this context, every action coming from Liniers became a source of criticism. As an example, his relation with Ana Périchon "la pericona" was severely pointed out, forcing him to lock her at her home and later to deport her to colonial Brazil. In the same spirit, his French birth became highly controversial when France invaded Spain, and started the Peninsular War, which included the removal of the Spanish king and queen by the French occupying forces. Despite the clear statements by Liniers of remaining loyal to the Spanish Empire and his refusal to accept Joseph Bonaparte as king, his political enemies created rumours that he was plotting to accept Bonaparte. They also promoted in the Río de la Plata the xenophobia that was taking place in Spain against the French, as an indirect means to attack Liniers and lower his prestige. The arrival of Sassenay, an agent of Napoleon seeking recognition for Joseph Bonaparte as King of Spain, boosted rumors and controversy.

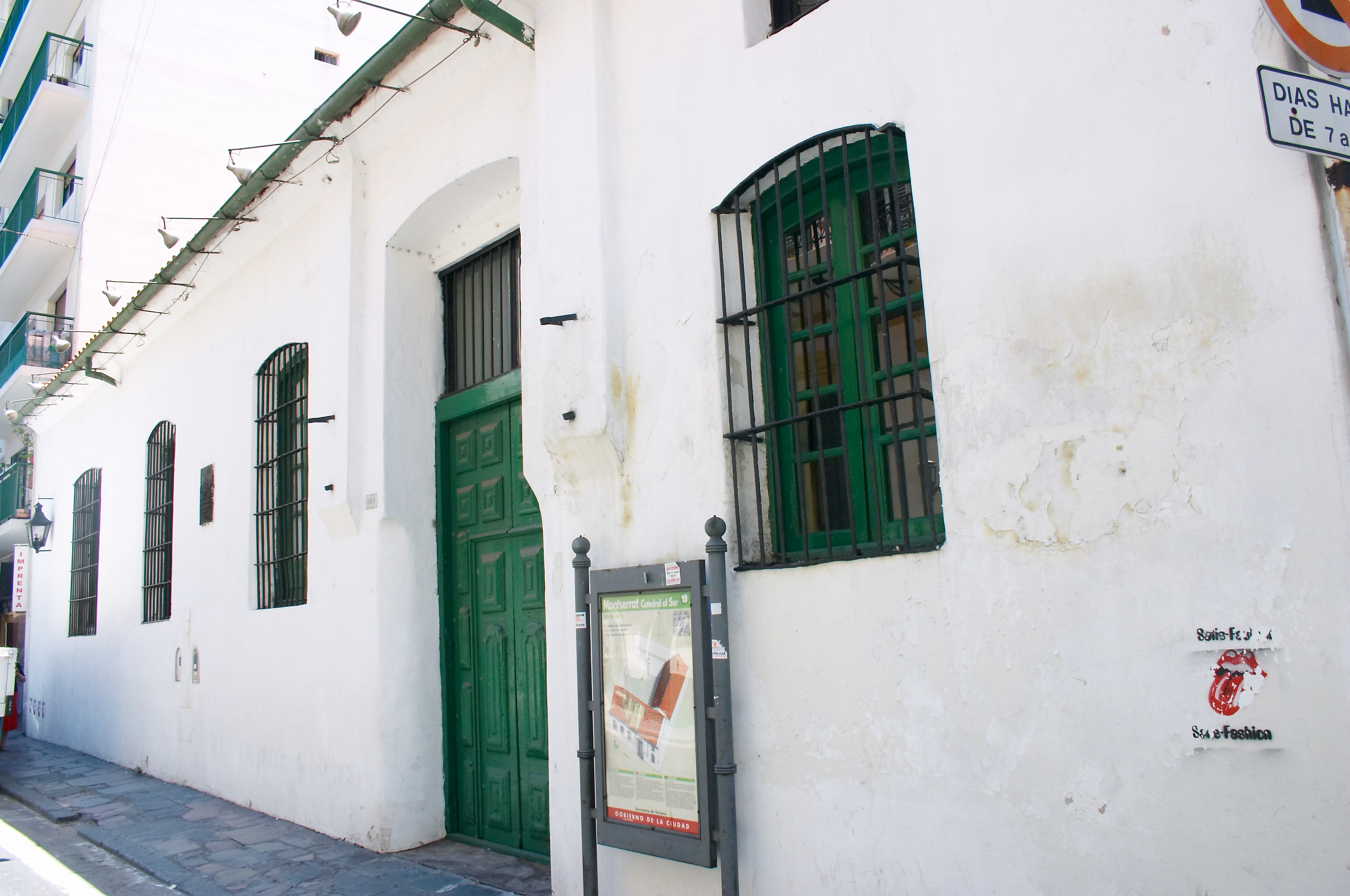
Liniers' house in Buenos Aires

The criollo peoples promoted the Carlotist project, which tried to crown Charlotte of Spain, sister of Ferdinand, as Regent of the Spanish territories in the Americas, under a Constitutional monarchy. The project did not achieve success. The news of the creation of the Junta of Seville was seen by both criollos and peninsulars as a chance to create similar governments locally, but they had different perspectives on the political line such governments should have. Javier de Elío, governor of Montevideo and allied with Álzaga, created a Junta in the city. Álzaga set off a mutiny to do the same in Buenos Aires, but the forces under the command of Cornelio Saavedra defeated it and kept Liniers in power. Álzaga was jailed and the military bodies that took part in the mutiny were dissolved, which left only military bodies loyal to the criollos.

The Junta of Seville appointed a new viceroy, Baltasar Hidalgo de Cisneros. Some Criollos proposed Liniers to resist the replacement with the forces under his command. It was considered that only a rightful king could appoint viceroys, and despite the circumstances of his designation Liniers had been confirmed in office by Charles IV; whereas Cisneros, appointed just by the Junta, may have lacked such legitimacy. However, Liniers rejected the proposal, and gave up government without resistance.

After leaving government, he retired from politics and moved to Córdoba province, settling in the town of Alta Gracia. However, he came out of his retirement shortly after, when news of the May Revolution arrived to the province.

== Counterrevolution and execution ==
The execution of Santiago de Liniers by firing squad

The governor of Córdoba, Juan Antonio Gutiérrez de la Concha, called for a meeting of the social elite of Córdoba, Liniers included, in order to discuss reactions towards the Primera Junta. At this time, Liniers's father-in-law, Martín de Sarratea, wrote a letter to ask him to stay away from the counterrevolution, which he refused in the name of honour and respect to his word.

The Córdoba Cabildo gave recognition instead to the Regency Council of Cádiz, and Cisneros secretly gave authorization to Liniers to raise the viceroyalty against the Junta. Liniers wrote to other Royalist leaders, trying to organize the forces to fight against Buenos Aires. The Junta decided that, among the many enemies that could threaten it, Córdoba was the most dangerous, so an army led by Ortiz de Ocampo was sent to fight against it. However, there was no fighting: the counterrevolutionary army was severely damaged by espionage, desertions, and sabotage. The mere proximity of the troops from Buenos Aires caused the complete dispersion of the army gathered by Liniers. Liniers and the other top personnel of the counterrevolution tried to flee in multiple directions, but Ocampo captured them all.

Ocampo refused to execute the prisoners, aware of their popularity, so he delivered them to Buenos Aires as prisoners instead. The Junta feared the effect that the entry of Liniers into the city might have, so Juan José Castelli was sent, with orders to replace Ocampo and execute the prisoners. The execution took place at Cabeza de Tigre, on the border between Santa Fe and Córdoba.

== Legacy ==
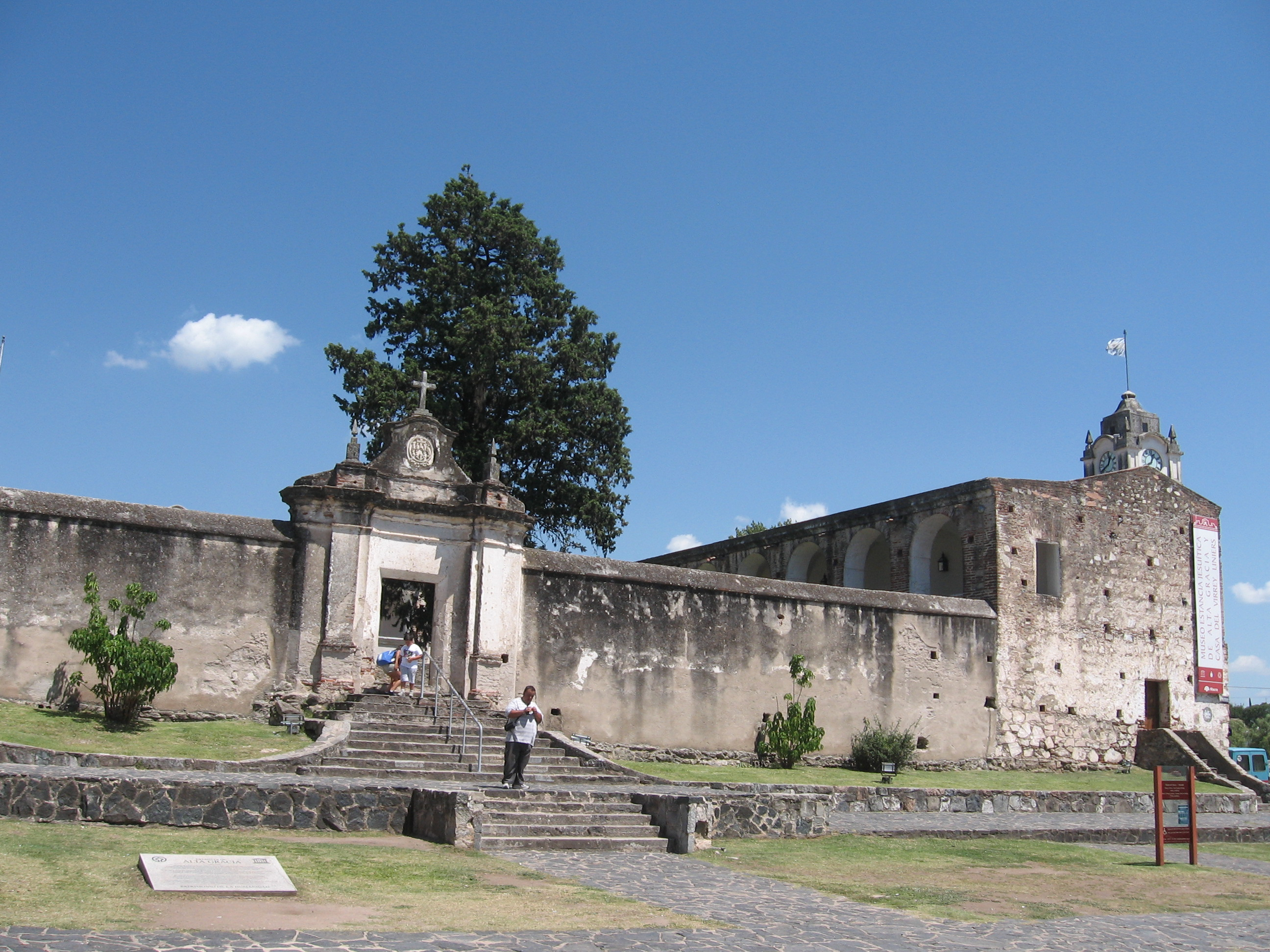
Museum at the former house of Liniers, at Alta Gracia in Córdoba Province, Argentina.

Liniers had been recognized in life with a street of Buenos Aires named after him, after the triumph against the British invasions. However, after the counterrevolution and the new number of heroes of the Argentine War of Independence, most names of such streets were modified in 1822, during the government of Martín Rodríguez. The former Liniers street consisted of the modern Defensa and Reconquista streets. The higher recognition to the heroes of the War of Independence stayed, but Liniers got renewed recognition with time. The Buenos Aires neighborhood of Liniers is named after him, as well as the Santiago de Liniers municipality in the Misiones Province.

In 1861, Queen Isabella II of Spain formally requested Liniers's body from the Argentine Government. The remains were brought back to Spain and solemnly buried in the Panteón de Marinos Ilustres of the island of San Fernando, Cádiz. At this time, Liniers's descendants received the hereditary title of "Conde de la Lealtad" (Count of Loyalty).

His house at Alta Gracia was abandoned after his death, and bought in 1820 by José Manuel Solares. His family kept it for a long time, until it was expropriated in 1969 and turned into a museum in 1977. It was declared a heritage of humanity by UNESCO on December 2, 2000.

- One of the best-known portraits of Liniers is La Reconquista de Buenos Aires, by Charles Fouqueray.
- El último virrey, a novel by Horacio Salduna, is based on Liniers' life.

== Bibliography ==
- De Titto, Ricardo (2010). Hombres de Mayo. Buenos Aires: Grupo Editorial Norma. pp. 25–50. ISBN 978-987-545-584-9.
- Groussac, Paul (1999). Santiago de Liniers: Conde de Buenos Aires. Buenos Aires: Ciudad Argentina. ISBN 987-507-114-5.
- Ortega, Exequiel (1944). Liniers, Una vida frente a la gloria y a la adversidad. Buenos Aires: Editorial Claridad.
- Crónica Histórica Argentina. Codex. 1968.
- Balmaceda, Daniel (2010). Historias de corceles y de acero. Buenos Aires: Sudamericana. ISBN 978-950-07-3180-5.
- Luna, Félix (2000). Grandes protagonistas de la historia argentina: Santiago de Liniers. Buenos Aires: Grupo Editorial Planeta. ISBN 950-49-0357-6.
- Jacques de Liniers, Général & Vice-Roi de La Plata, par Le Marquis de Sassenay, Editions de La Reconquête, Asuncion 2011.
- Demaría, Gonzalo; Molina de Castro, Diego (2001). Historia Genealógica de los Virreyes del Río de la Plata (in Spanish). Buenos Aires: Junta Sabatina de Especialidades Históricas. ISBN 987-1042-01-9.

Government offices
Preceded by Rafael de Sobremonte	Viceroy of the Río de la Plata; 1807–1809	Succeeded by Baltasar Hidalgo de Cisneros
