= Siege of Montevideo (1812–1814) =

- Part of the Second Banda Oriental campaign
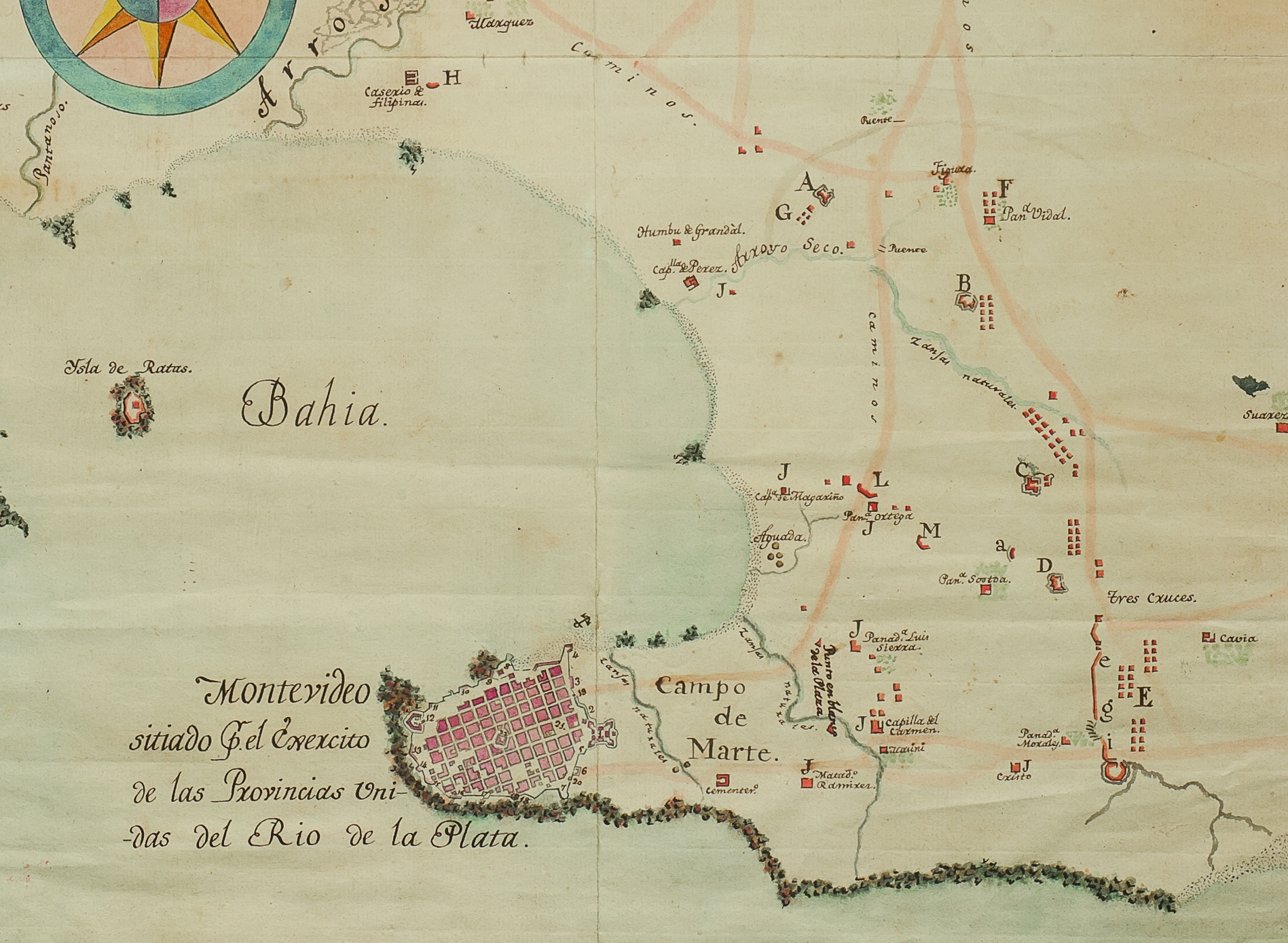
- Map of Montevideo with besieging lines, 1813.
Date	1812–1814
Location	Montevideo 34°51′12″S 56°10′13″W
Result	Patriot victory

Belligerents
United Provinces	Spanish Empire

Commanders and leaders
José Rondeau; William Brown	Gaspar de Vigodet; Miguel de la Sierra

Strength
4,000	7,000

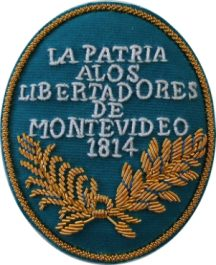
Honorary shield granted to the troops after taking Montevidéu.

The event known as the second siege of Montevideo (Spanish: Segundo Sitio de Montevideo) took place between 1812 and 1814, when the patriotic troops led by José Rondeau besieged the city of Montevideo, still held by Spanish loyalists under the leadership of Gaspar de Vigodet, governor of Montevideo. The siege was successful and marked the end of the Spanish presence in present-day Uruguay.

During this whole period and just like in the failed first siege of Montevideo, supplied from over the sea, the city held out, until 17 May 1814. Then, the naval victories of Admiral William Brown, cut off the supply route and the city faced starvation. By the end of June, Vigodet was forced to surrender Montevideo to General Carlos María de Alvear.

== See also ==
- Battle of Cerrito
- Dissolution of the Viceroyalty of the Río de la Plata
- Gaspar de Vigodet
- José Rondeau
