= Dissolution of the Viceroyalty of the Río de la Plata =

The dissolution of the Viceroyalty of the Río de la Plata meant the breakup of this Spanish colony in South America and the creation of new independent countries. Most of the territory of the Spanish viceroyalty is now part of Argentina, and other regions belong to Bolivia, Brazil, Paraguay and Uruguay.

== Overview ==
The Viceroyalty of the Río de la Plata was a Spanish colonial administrative division in South America. It was established in 1776 by Charles III of Spain, with territories from the Viceroyalty of Peru. He aimed to strengthen the territories coveted by colonial Brazil, which invaded the Misiones Orientales and sought to expand towards the Río de la Plata. The cities that composed the viceroyalty were, for the most part, very distant from each other, and with few actual bounds; their organization was still similar to that of feudal Europe.

Carlota Joaquina, sister of the Spanish king Ferdinand VII and married to the regent prince of Portugal, sought to take advantage of the Peninsular War to rule over the Spanish territories. Her project, however, was resisted and did not succeed.

The Junta of Buenos Aires ousted the viceroy Baltasar Hidalgo de Cisneros and began the Argentine War of Independence, seceding Spanish territory with the creation of an independent state, the United Provinces of the Río de la Plata. However, other territories stood against Buenos Aires, staying loyal to the Spanish rule, and the actual status of each zone depended upon the military conflicts; Paraguay and the Upper Peru (modern Bolivia) could resist Buenos Aires. Spain declared Buenos Aires a rogue city and appointed Montevideo as the new capital of the Viceroyalty, but Javier de Elío was sieged by Buenos Aires and the rural populations, and could not maintain authority beyond the Banda Oriental (modern Uruguay). Montevideo would be finally captured by William Brown and Alvear.

The battle of Cepeda ended the authority of the Spanish colonial Supreme Directors in 1820, and for a period of time there was no head of state in the country. Juan Manuel de Rosas united the provinces in the federal pact, so that the governor of Buenos Aires Province managed international relations, acting similarly to a head of state of the country until a Constitution was written. The United Provinces were then renamed as the Argentine Confederation.

== Bolivia ==
The Upper Peru was a disputed area even before the war. It had long been related to Lima, capital of the Viceroyalty of Peru. Charles III removed it from that viceroyalty and assigned it instead to the Viceroyalty of the Río de la Plata. However, commercial and cultural ties stayed stronger with Lima than with Buenos Aires, the new capital.

The Upper Peru began uprisings before Buenos Aires, with the 1809 rebellions at Chuquisaca (modern Sucre) and La Paz. Both ones were quickly defeated, and the royal authority restored. When Buenos Aires deposed the viceroy, the Upper Peru stayed a royalist stronghold. Juan José Castelli, Manuel Belgrano and José Rondeau attempted to seize the area, but failed. Conversely, all the royalist attempts to invade the United Provinces were routed by Manuel Belgrano and Martín Miguel de Güemes.

José de San Martín and Simón Bolívar concluded the war in northern South America. Sucre liberated this last royalist stronghold, and named it "Bolivia" after Bolívar. The local Congress declared it an independent nation, which was accepted by Argentina without resistance. Bolivia invaded Tarija a few years later, but again, Argentina did not declare war over it.

== Misiones Orientales ==
The Misiones Orientales became part of the Viceroyalty in 1777, with the First Treaty of San Ildefonso. However, after being invaded by Spain in the War of the Oranges, Portugal invaded and annexed the zone in 1801. It was then turned into a captaincy in 1807, with strong military presence. The whole Banda Oriental (modern Uruguay) would be annexed by the United Kingdom of Portugal, Brazil and the Algarves in 1816, the Misiones were briefly liberated by Andrés Guazurary during the conflict, but he was eventually defeated. By then, the Viceroyalty had already become the United Provinces of the Río de la Plata, and Brazil would declare its independence a few years later.

The Banda Oriental, now renamed as "Cisplatina" by Brazil, revolted and rejoined the United Provinces. This led to a war between both countries for the control of the area. Fructuoso Rivera seized the Misiones during the conflict, while attempting to drive the Brazilians out of the province. However, the 1828 Treaty of Montevideo that ended the war returned them to Brazilian control by diplomatic means.

== Paraguay ==
Paraguay, ruled by Velazco, did not accept the Primera Junta, and swore loyalty to the Spanish authorities. However, the Junta was misinformed and thought that there was a huge faction supporting them, oppressed by Velazco. Manuel Belgrano was sent with a small army to secure the province, but the Paraguay campaign was a military failure. The resistance to Belgrano was huge, defeating him at Paraguari and Tacuari. Belgrano left the province, making a non-aggression pact: Buenos Aires would not send further military campaigns to Paraguay, if Paraguay did not do it either.

The Paraguayan military made a coup against Velazco after Belgrano's departure, and declared independence from Spain. For years, it was nominally part of the United Provinces but acted similarly to an independent state. However, there would be no declaration of independence from Argentina until 1842, and it would not be recognized until 1852.

== Uruguay ==
The territory of modern Uruguay has been disputed by Spain and Portugal since the earliest days of the European colonization of the Americas. Pedro de Cevallos conquered the area in 1777 during the Spanish–Portuguese War, which was included in the viceroyalty, created that year. He cancelled the invasion of Rio Grande, as the peace negotiations had begun.

Buenos Aires and Montevideo fought together against the British invasions of the Río de la Plata. Buenos Aires was conquered by British forces, and then liberated by an army from Montevideo, led by Santiago de Liniers. Montevideo was conquered first the following year, but the British could not conquer Buenos Aires a second time, and liberated Montevideo in the terms of their capitulation. The Anglo-Spanish war ended when Napoleon invaded Spain, and the remaining Spaniards allied with Britain. However, both cities had a local rivalry, increased by the outbreak of the war and the capture of the king. Javier de Elío, governor of Montevideo, appointed a government Junta, refusing to take orders from viceroy Liniers. Spain appointed a new viceroy, Baltasar Hidalgo de Cisneros, who was accepted by Elío.

When the war worsened, several criollos of Buenos Aires led the May Revolution against Cisneros, deposing him and establishing a government junta. Montevideo denied recognition to it, and began a war against Buenos Aires. José Gervasio Artigas, from the countryside of Montevideo, joined the siege to the city. Elío requested Portuguese aid, but soon had to ally with his enemies against his intended reinforcements, as the Portuguese saw it as a chance to conquer the Banda Oriental. The British diplomacy called them back, and the hostilities renewed between Montevideo, Buenos Aires and Artigas. Artigas felt betrayed by Buenos Aires, so it turned into a war with three belligerents. Buenos Aires conquered Montevideo, under the command of William Brown and Alvear.

Artigas expanded his area of influence to Mesopotamia, Santa Fe and Córdoba, and waged the Argentine Civil Wars against Buenos Aires. Portugal made a new attack to the Banda Oriental, annexed it and renamed it as Cisplatina. Buenos Aires did not help Artigas against the invasion. The remaining Artiguist forces attacked Buenos Aires in retaliation for its passivity, and defeated the city at the battle of Cepeda. The Supreme Directorship was abolished, and the country worked as a confederation of provinces. The Portuguese colony declared independence from Portugal, and became the Empire of Brazil.

However, the orientals still resented the Brazilian rule. The Thirty-Three Orientals led a rebellion that liberated the banda oriental, and requested to rejoin the United Provinces. The constituent assembly accepted, which led to the Argentine-Brazilian War. Despite the military victories, the Argentine president Bernardino Rivadavia needed the army to fight against the federal caudillos, so he sent a diplomat to rush an end of hostilities. The treaty declared the disputed area to be an independent nation, and not part of either Argentina or Brazil.

Still, the Uruguayans still had strong ties with Argentina. The Uruguayan Civil War between Blancos and Colorados mirrored the Argentine Civil Wars, with both factions allying with the Federals and the Unitarians.

== Irredentism ==
Argentina had diplomatic conflicts with Brazil and Chile in the 1880s. In this context, the writer and diplomat Vicente Quesada coined the concept of a "Great Argentina", a country encompassing all the territories of the former viceroyalty, which would likely have failed because of British and Brazilian plans to have the territory break into smaller sovereign states, the mistakes of the Argentine diplomacy and the perspectives of the Unitarian party, that preferred a smaller country centered around Buenos Aires. The idea was soon taken by other historians, school textbooks, historical atlas, essays, etc. The purpose of reconstructing the broken country was pointed as a highly desirable goal, but without considering military expansionism as an acceptable option; only a political union achieved by diplomatic means. It was also used to promote Argentine patriotism during the Great European immigration wave to Argentina.

== Bibliography ==
- Cavaleri, Paulo (2004). La restauración del Virreinato: orígenes del nacionalismo territorial Argentino (in Spanish). Buenos Aires: Universidad Nacional de Quilmes. ISBN 987-558-031-7.
