= El último virrey =

El último virrey (in Spanish, The last viceroy) is an Argentine historical novel written by Horacio Salduna and published in 1987. The novel deals with the life of Santiago de Liniers from the start of the British invasions of the Río de la Plata up to his death before a firing squad after leading a failed counter-revolution against the May Revolution in Cordoba.

The book is closely based on the real historical events, avoiding to make substantial changes. However, the quotations provided are both real quotations and quotations made up by the author's initiative, based on the personality of the men described and the events detailed. The story details, as well as the historical background, the relations of Liniers with his family and friends, and his enemy Martín de Álzaga.

The name of the book is historically inaccurate, as Liniers was not the last viceroy of the Viceroyalty of the Río de la Plata: he was replaced by Baltasar Hidalgo de Cisneros, and after the removal of Cisneros during the May Revolution, Javier De Elío proclaimed himself viceroy. The reason of the title, suggested in the plot, is that Liniers was the last viceroy designated by a King of Spain, whereas Cisneros and De Elío were designated by the Junta of Seville. This reflects the principle of the Retroversion of the sovereignty of the people of the time, that stated that only a rightful king had the power to designate viceroys, and as such Cisneros and De Elío may lack such legitimacy.

== See also ==
- Argentina War of Independence
