= Francisco Javier de Elío =

Spanish Army officer and colonial administrator (1767–1822)

The Most Excellent Francisco Javier de Elío
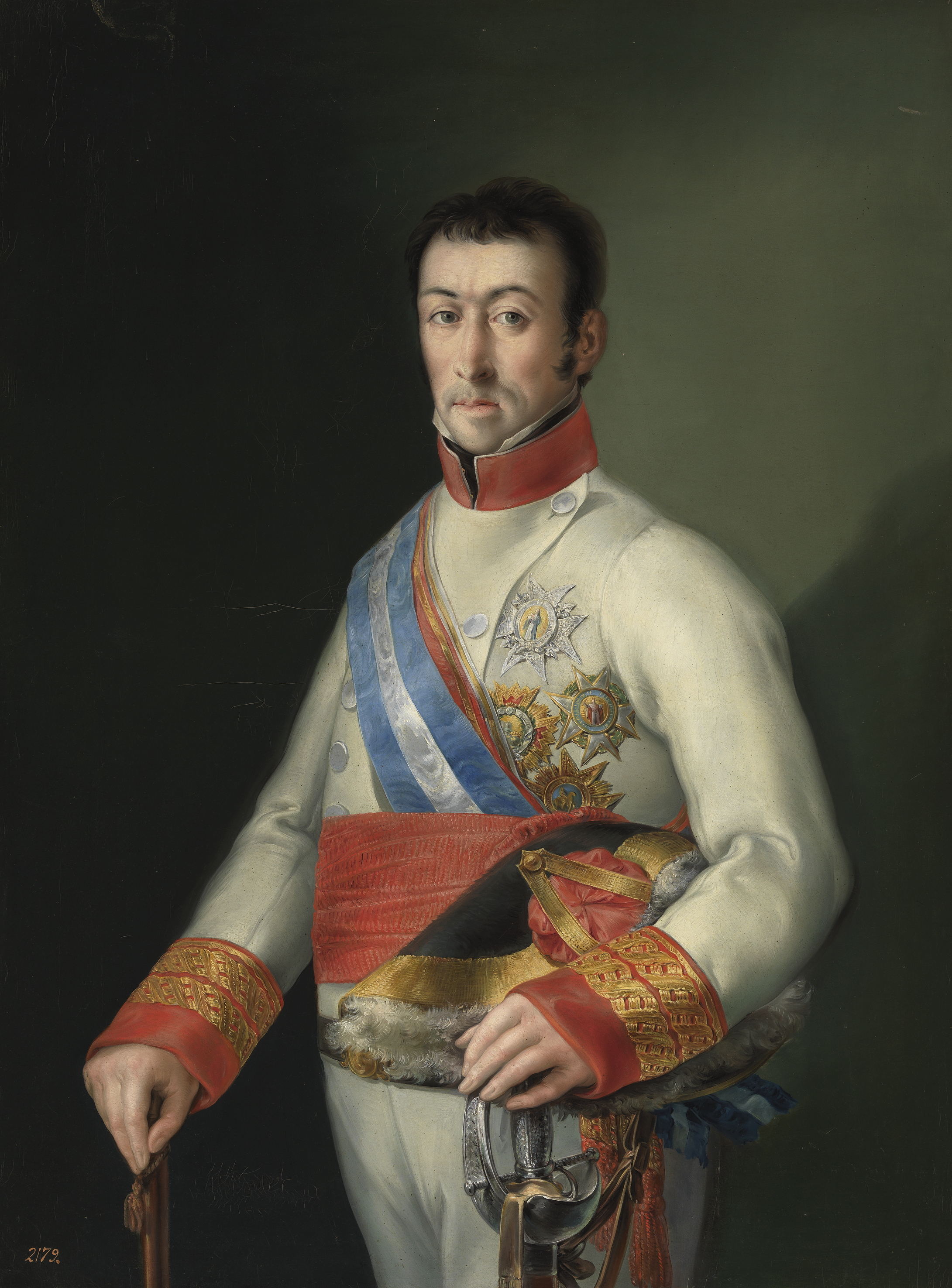
- Portrait by Miguel Parra, c. 1815

Viceroy of the Río de la Plata
- In office Designated: 31 August 1810 – 12 January 1811
- In office 12 January 1811 – 18 November 1811
- Appointed by: Self-proclaimed and confirmed by the Cortes of Cádiz
- Monarch: Ferdinand VII
- Prime Minister: First Secretary of State; Nicolás Ambrosio Garro y Arizcun
- Minister: Secretary of the Indies; No secretary (affairs of Indies distributed among different secretariats)
- Preceded by: Baltasar Hidalgo de Cisneros
- Succeeded by: Gaspar de Vigodet

Personal details
- Born: 5 March 1767 Pamplona, Spain
- Died: 4 September 1822 (aged 55) Valencia, Spain

Francisco Javier de Elío y Olóndriz (5 March 1767 – 4 September 1822) was a Spanish Army officer and colonial administrator who served as the governor of Montevideo. He was instrumental in the Absolutist repression after the restoration of Ferdinand VII as King of Spain. For this, he was executed during the Trienio Liberal.

== Political Chief of Río de la Plata ==
Francisco Javier de Elío was born in Pamplona in 1767. He served as governor of Montevideo between 1807 and 1809, when he plotted with Martín de Álzaga against his superior Santiago de Liniers, Viceroy of the Río de la Plata. This failed because Liniers was supported by Cornelio Saavedra and criollo militias.

In May 1810, Liniers' successor Baltasar Hidalgo de Cisneros was deposed by the May Revolution. Elío remained in control of Montevideo and the Banda Oriental and declared himself Viceroy of Río de la Plata, which was confirmed as Political Chief by the Cortes of Cádiz on January 19, 1811.

One month later the rural population of the Banda Oriental under José Gervasio Artigas also rebelled against Spain, and in May the troops of Elío were beaten in the Battle of Las Piedras. Only left in control of Colonia del Sacramento and Montevideo, Elío returned to Spain on November 18, 1811, and resigned as Political Chief in January 1812.

== Back in Spain ==
When King Ferdinand VII of Spain returned in 1814 from exile in France, he was requested by the Cortes to respect the liberal Spanish Constitution of 1812, which seriously limited the royal powers. Ferdinand refused and went to Valencia instead of Madrid. Here, on April 17, General Elío invited the king to reclaim his absolute rights and put his troops at the king's disposition.

A fervent follower of the absolutist cause, Elío played an important role in the repression of the supporters of the Constitution of 1812. For this, he was arrested during the Trienio Liberal and executed in Valencia in 1822.

=== Copla ===
The Official Chronicler of the City of Madrid from 1966 to 1983, Federico Carlos Sáinz de Robles, mentions in his essay Autobiography of Madrid (1957), a popular copla in Madrid in 1814 and 1815 about Elío and two other generals, Joaquín Ibáñez, 3rd Baron de Eroles and Francisco de Eguía, the three of whom were considered "uncouth, fanatical and cruel":

Eguía, Eroles, Elío...
Dios te libre de los tres;
porque si Dios no te libra,
¡Santíguate y muérete!
¡Santíguate y muérete!
(Eguía, Eroles, Elío...
God save you from the three
because if God doesn't save you
Make the sign of the cross and prepare to die!
Make the sign of the cross and prepare to die!)

== See also ==
- First Siege of Montevideo
- Dissolution of the Viceroyalty of the Río de la Plata

Government offices
Preceded by Baltasar Hidalgo de Cisneros	Viceroy of the Río de la Plata; 1810–1811	Succeeded by None
