= Ildefonso Ramos Mexía =

Argentine politician and governor (1769–1854)

Ildefonso Ramos Mexía y Ross
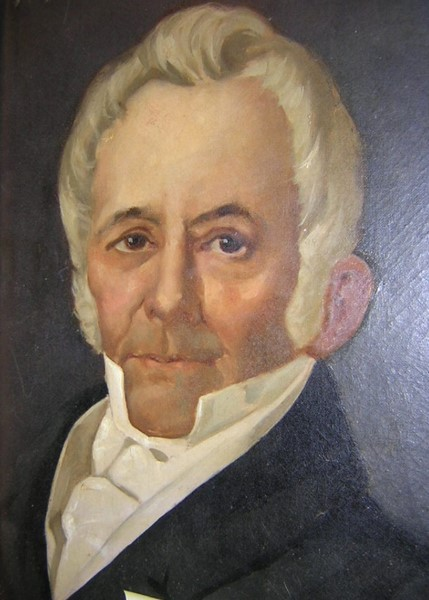
- Portrait of Ildefonso Ramos Mexía

Governor of Buenos Aires Province
- In office 2 May 1820 – 20 June 1820
- Preceded by: Manuel de Sarratea
- Succeeded by: Cabildo of Buenos Aires (interim); Miguel Estanislao Soler (from 23 June 1820)

Personal details
- Born: 2 August 1769 Buenos Aires, Viceroyalty of the Río de la Plata
- Died: 24 June 1854 (aged 84) Buenos Aires, Argentine Confederation
- Profession: Jurist, politician

Ildefonso Ramos Mexía y Ross (2 August 1769 – 24 June 1854) was an Argentine jurist, military officer and politician. He served as governor of Buenos Aires Province between 2 May and 20 June 1820, during the period known as the Anarchy of the Year XX. His brief administration ended with his resignation on 20 June; the Cabildo of Buenos Aires acted interinamente until the assumption of Miguel Estanislao Soler on 23 June.

== Career ==
Ramos Mexía took part in the political and military life of Buenos Aires in the 1810s. Following the defeat of the central government at Cepeda and the dissolution of the Directorio, the provincial Junta de Representantes appointed him governor on 2 May 1820. Contemporary broadsides preserved in library collections record his early measures in office, including communications to municipal authorities and orders relating to the Junta de Residencia.

Specialist literature of the Academia Nacional de la Historia situates his administration within the crisis and power reconfigurations of 1820 in Buenos Aires.

== Governor of Buenos Aires Province (1820) ==
On 2 May 1820 Ramos Mexía assumed as governor and captain general. During his tenure, documents show coordination with the Junta de Representantes and the issuance of administrative orders and circulars. He resigned on 20 June amid military pressures in the capital; the Cabildo took over on an interim basis until the installation of Soler on 23 June. Broadsides of the period reflect that transition and the deposit of the insignia of command in the Cabildo.

== Later activity ==
Archival indices and printed sources register Ramos Mexía among the deputies of the Congreso General Constituyente that sanctioned the 1826 constitution, representing the capital. Additional contemporary pieces tied to his public correspondence and gubernatorial acts are held in the collections of the Museo Mitre and the Archivo General de la Nación.

== Death ==
Ramos Mexía died in Buenos Aires on 24 June 1854. Standard biographical works place his birth on 2 August 1769.Cutolo, Vicente Osvaldo (1968–1983). Nuevo diccionario biográfico argentino (1750–1930) (in Spanish). Vol. VI. Buenos Aires: Editorial Elche.

== See also ==
- Anarquía del Año XX
- Buenos Aires Province
- Junta de Representantes de Buenos Aires
