= Ana Estefanía Dominga Riglos =

Argentine patriot

Ana Estefanía Dominga Riglos Lezica
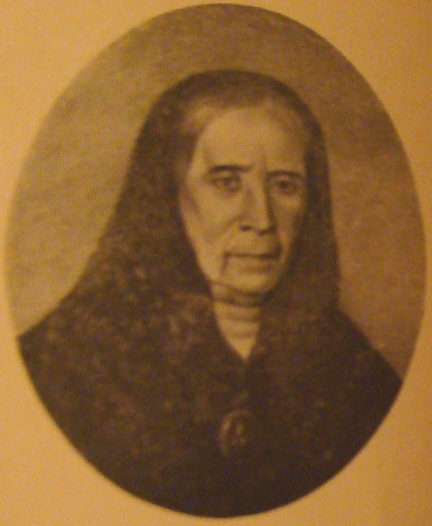
- Ana Riglos circa 1850
- Born: 3 August 1788; Buenos Aires, Argentina
- Died: 14 July 1870 (aged 81); Buenos Aires, Argentina
- Occupation: Patriot

Ana Estefanía Dominga Riglos Lezica, by marriage Ana Riglos de Irigoyen (3 August 1788 – 14 July 1870), was a Buenos Aires patrician, an Argentine patriot, wife of the soldier and police chief Miguel de Irigoyen.

== Family ==
Ana Estefanía Dominga Riglos Lezica was born on 3 August 1788 in Buenos Aires. She was from one of the leading families of Buenos Aires. Her father was doctor Francisco Javier de Riglos y San Martín de Avellaneda, advocate of the Real Audiencia de Charcas. Her mother was Juana Lezica y Ortega. She was recognized as one of the "Patricias Argentinas". Her father's brother was Miguel Fermín Mariano Riglos San Martín, who married Mercedes de Lasala de Riglos. Mercedes Lasala was one of the founders of the Sociedad de Beneficencia (Charity Society) created by Bernardino Rivadavia in 1823.

== Life ==
On 22 December 1809 Ana Estefanía married her cousin Miguel Remigio Irigoyen de la Quintana y Riglos (1764–1822). In May 1810 Ana Estefanía Dominga Riglos de Irigoyen accompanied Casilda Igarzábal de Rodríguez Peña (wife of Nicolás Rodríguez Peña), Melchora Sarratea and other patrician ladies to meet the hesitant Cornelio Saavedra and convince him to support the nascent May Revolution. On 5 July 1810 she appeared in the list of donors to the expedition to unite the provinces. She promised to support two men in the First Upper Peru campaign and to donate all her jewelry in case of need.

Ana's husband Miguel Irigoyen died on 11 June 1822. On 21 September 1824 she married Antonio María Nicómedes Pirán Balbastro (1796–1861). Her children by the second marriage were Carmen Pirán Riglos (1825-1882), Eulalia Pirán Riglos (c. 1831–1922) and Antonio Pirán Riglos. She died on 14 July 1870.

== Sources ==
- Bunge, Carlos F. (21 December 2015), María Josefa de las Mercedes Lasala Fernández de Larrazábal
- Documentos históricos: Album de cartas coloniales (in Spanish), Archivo de Gobierno, 1931
- García López, Ana Belén (2016-11-07), Las heroínas silenciadas en las independencias hispanoamericanas (in Spanish), Megustaescribirlibros, ISBN 978-84-9112-679-9
- Ibarguren, Carlos F., "Ana Estefanía Dominga Riglos Lezica", Genealogía Familiar (in Spanish)
- Institución Mitre (1945), Diccionario biográfico colonial argentino (in Spanish), Editorial Huarpes, s.a.
- Instituto Argentino de Ciencias Genealógicas (1961), Genealogía, hombres de mayo (in Spanish), Revista del Instituto Argentino de Ciencias Genealógicas
- Thames, Juan (20 May 2016), "De French y Beruti al decreto del año 12: la verdad de la escarapela", infobae (in Spanish)
