= Liniers counterrevolution =

1810 pro-royalist action in Argentina

Liniers counter-revolution
- Execution of Santiago de Liniers
- Date: May–July 1810
- Location: Córdoba Province (Argentina)
- Participants: Santiago de Liniers and other royalists from Córdoba
- Outcome: Counter-revolution failed, leaders executed. Córdoba supports the Primera Junta.

The Liniers counter-revolution took place in the Spanish Viceroyalty of the Río de la Plata after the May Revolution in 1810. The former viceroy, Santiago de Liniers, led an ill-fated counter-revolutionary attempt from the city of Córdoba (in Argentina), and it was quickly frustrated by the patriotic forces of the newly formed Army of the North. Francisco Ortiz de Ocampo, the leader of the Army of the North, captured the leaders and dispatched them to Buenos Aires as prisoners, but, on the orders of the Primera Junta, they were intercepted and executed before arrival.

== Development ==
On May 25, 1810, Viceroy Baltasar Hidalgo de Cisneros was deposed by the May Revolution, and replaced by the Primera Junta, requesting the other cities in the Viceroyalty of the Río de la Plata to join them and send deputies. Liniers was living by then at Córdoba. After being deposed, Cisneros sent instructions to Liniers to prepare a resistance against the revolution, granting him full powers to do so. A meeting of notable people from Córdoba, including Liniers, Córdoba's bishop Rodrigo de Orellana and governor Juan Gutiérrez de la Concha, decided to rise in arms against the revolution. Only the Dean Gregorio Funes supported the actions of Buenos Aires.

The royalist perspectives were favourable: the Junta was not recognized by Paraguay, Montevideo was preparing to take actions, and Goyeneche and Nieto could bring strong reinforcements from the north. If Córdoba could stand, the fate of the Primera Junta would have been doomed.

The Junta decided then that the best strategy would be to act immediately against the counter-revolution in Cordoba. Ortiz de Ocampo prepared an army and headed to Córdoba, with orders from the Junta to take the leaders prisoners. A later order would request instead the death of the counter-revolutionaries. Although this ruling is commonly attributed to Mariano Moreno, it was supported and signed by all members of the Junta, with the sole exception of Manuel Alberti, who could not approve capital punishment because of his religious titles.

There was no battle: all the forces gathered by Liniers deserted or melted away, and he was left alone. He intended to escape to the north and join the armies of Nieto and Goyeneche, but Ocampo managed to capture him and the other leaders. However, he did not shoot them, but dispatched them as prisoners to Buenos Aires, following the first orders and a petition by the Dean Gregorio Funes.

Mariano Moreno did not accept this, fearing that the prestige of Liniers may cause a political commotion if held prisoner or executed in the city. He then asked the vocal Juan José Castelli to intercept the convoy, take command of the army and enforce the ruling. By this time, the bishop Orellana was spared from the death sentence. Castelli got to the prisoners in time, and shot them without trial at Cabeza de Tigre, a staging post on the southern banks of Tercero River in southeastern Córdoba.

Once the uprising attempt was thwarted, the administration of Córdoba was purged of royalists, and Pueyrredón was designated as new governor. A following open cabildo choose Funes as the deputy decreed by the Junta. The army would keep the march to the north, to the First Upper Peru campaign.

== Bibliography ==
- Abad de Santillán, Diego. Historia Argentina (in Spanish). Buenos Aires: TEA (Tipográfica Editora Argentina).
