= Baltasar Hidalgo de Cisneros =

Spanish Navy officer and colonial administrator (1756–1829)

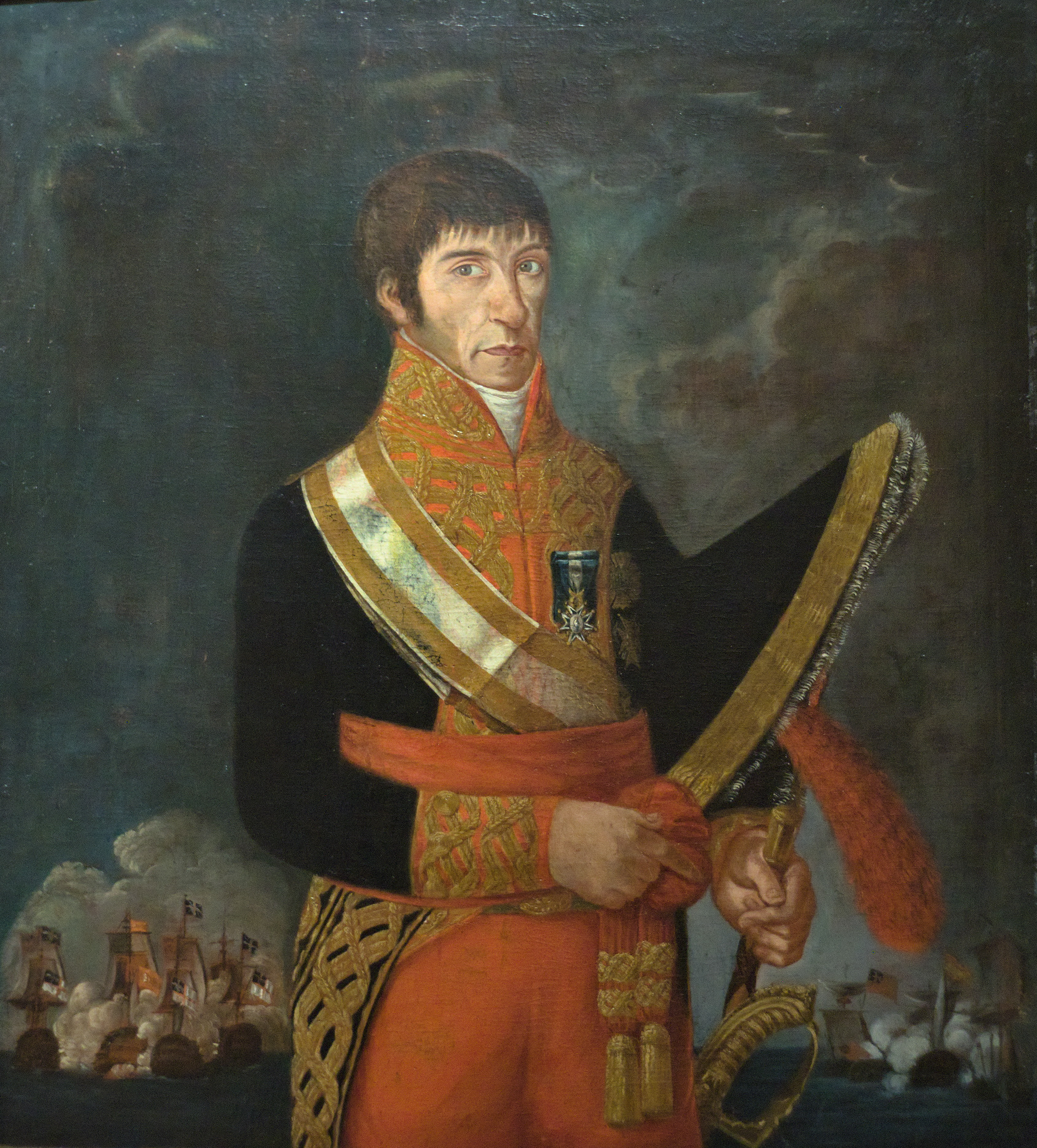
- Portrait of Baltasar Hidalgo de Cisneros

11th Viceroy of Río de la Plata
- In office 15 July 1809 – 25 May 1810
- Monarch: Junta of Seville
- Preceded by: Santiago de Liniers
- Succeeded by: Francisco Javier de Elío

Personal details
- Born: 6 January 1756 Cartagena, Spain
- Died: 9 June 1829 (aged 73) Cartagena, Spain
- Party: Royalist
- Spouse: Inés de Gaztambide

Military service
- Allegiance: Spain
- Years of service: 1770–1805
- Rank: Admiral
- Commands: San Pablo, Nuestra Señora de la Santísima Trinidad
- Battles/wars: Battle of Cape St Vincent, Battle of Trafalgar

Baltasar Hidalgo de Cisneros y de la Torre (6 January 1756 – 9 June 1829) was a Spanish Navy officer and colonial administrator. He took part in the Battle of Cape St Vincent and the Battle of Trafalgar, and in the Spanish resistance against Napoleon's invasion in 1808. He was later appointed Viceroy of the Viceroyalty of the Río de la Plata, replacing Santiago de Liniers. He disestablished the government Junta of Javier de Elío and quelled the Chuquisaca Revolution and the La Paz revolution. An open cabildo deposed him as viceroy during the May Revolution, but he attempted to be the president of the new government junta, thus retaining power. The popular unrest in Buenos Aires did not allow that, so he resigned. He was banished back to Spain shortly after that, and died in 1829.

== Biography ==
Baltasar Hidalgo de Cisneros was born on 6 January 1756, which is the religious feast of Epiphany day, Hence he was named Baltasar after one of the Biblical Magi. Son of Francisco Hidalgo de Cisneros y Seijas, lieutenant of the Spanish Royal Navy, and Manuela de la Torre y Galindo de Espinosa. He commenced his naval career in 1770 and went to the coasts of Africa and Peru and took part in the military campaign at Algiers. He was involved in the capture of an enemy ship in the English Channel, and was promoted to ship's lieutenant. In 1795, he was promoted to commander of the San Pablo, part of the Spanish fleet under José de Córdoba y Ramos. Spain at that time was engaged in the Anglo-Spanish War. The fleet engaged a smaller British fleet, but was defeated in the Battle of Cape St Vincent.

In 1803, he was in charge of the arsenal of Cartagena, his city of birth. In 1805 he was the captain of the largest Spanish ship Nuestra Señora de la Santísima Trinidad during the battle of Trafalgar, a major British victory over the combined Spanish and French fleets. The ship, whilst engaged in battle, lost a mast which fell over Hidalgo de Cisneros' head. This caused a concussion, which left him partially deaf for the rest of his life. After the incident, Hidalgo de Cisneros was nicknamed "El sordo" (Spanish: "The deaf"). His ship, regarded as one of the most powerful of its time, was captured by HMS Neptune but sank the following day. Cisneros was taken prisoner and received medical care. Whilst under capture he was awarded battle honours and on returning to Spain he was promoted to lieutenant general.

=== Work as viceroy ===
After recovering from his wounds, Hidalgo de Cisneros received further promotion and served as vice-president of the governing council ("Junta") of Cartagena. The superior Junta of Seville later resolved to end the insurrection in the Río de la Plata, sending Cisneros to replace the viceroy Santiago de Liniers. The Junta regarded Liniers as a rebel with Bonapartist sympathies known in Spanish as an afrancesado. The mutiny of Álzaga, a failed coup by conservative peninsulars against Liniers who was supported by the emerging local bourgeois, was regarded as rebellion by Liniers, influenced by French ideas but who was not a Napoleonic agent. The Junta gave Hidalgo de Cisneros orders to land in Montevideo, raise armies against Liniers, prosecute him with court-martial and return him under guard to Spain and to dissolve the local criollo militia. Cisneros also had orders to seek and punish likely Napoleonic sympathisers. The Junta created a political office to conduct direct foreign relations with colonial Brazil, to reign in the autonomy being exercised by the viceroy which was seen as potentially insubordinate and secessionist.

He arrived in Montevideo in June 1809. Manuel Belgrano proposed Liniers to resist his removal and to reject the appointment of Cisneros, on the grounds that Liniers had been confirmed as Viceroy by the authority of a Spanish king, while Cisneros would lack such legitimacy. Nevertheless, Liniers accepted to give up his government to Cisneros without resistance. Noticing that Liniers was not the rebel governor that the Junta thought, he authorized him to stay in the Viceroyalty. Javier de Elío accepted as well the authority of the new Viceroy and dissolved the Junta of Montevideo, becoming once again the Governor of the city.

Cisneros tried to take a conciliating policy with the many conflicting political groups. He kept the criollo militias, and granted their commanders to achieve veteran status, which so far was only allowed to peninsular military. He rearmed back the Spanish militias that were disbanded after the coup against Liniers. He also pardoned the responsibles; Álzaga was not freed, but his sentence was changed to house arrest. However, the attempts to please the criollos found resistance from the Junta, which did not approve the request to promote Cornelio Saavedra to colonel rank.

He tried to stay in good relations with the British and the landowners by removing the laws that forbid free trade, but retailers forced Cisneros to restore such laws. Mariano Moreno, a criollo lawyer, wrote a document to request Cisneros the reopening of free trade, entitled "The Representation of the Landowners". It is considered the most comprehensive economic report of the time. Cisneros finally decided to grant an extension of free trade, which would end on 19 May 1810.

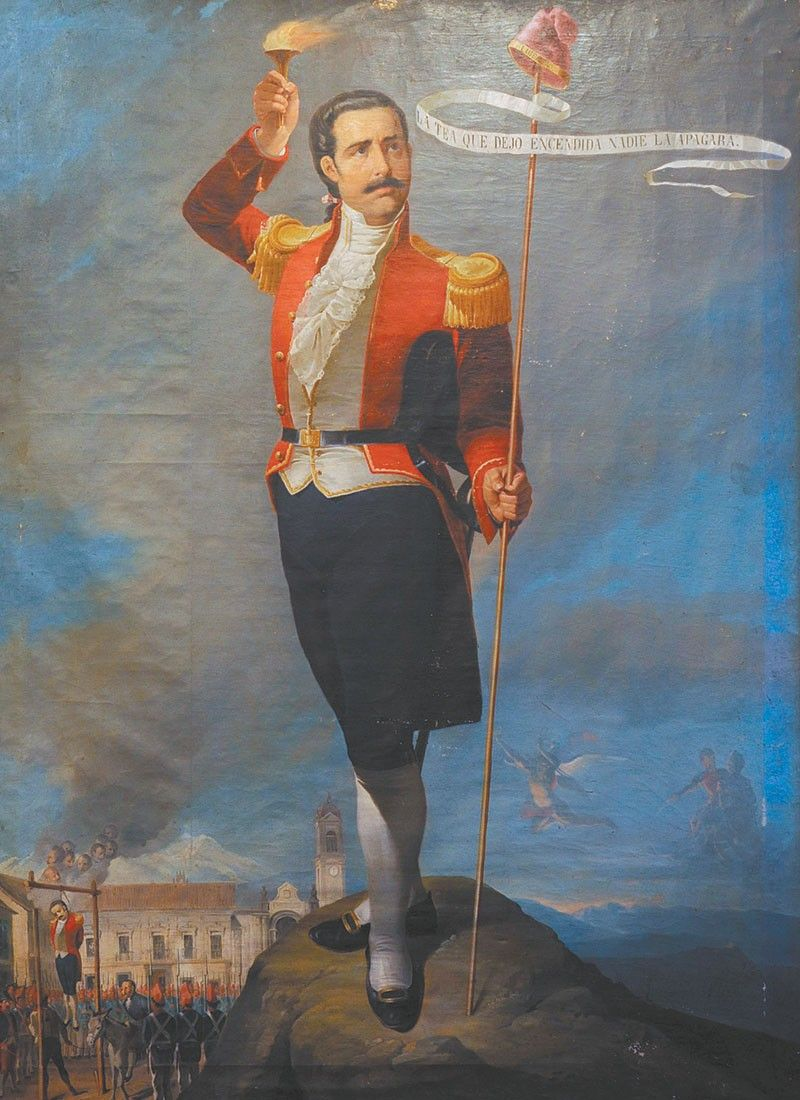
Portrait of Pedro Murillo, by Joaquín Pinto.

On 25 May 1809, a revolution in Chuquisaca deposed the governor and president of the Royal Audiencia of Charcas, Ramón García de León y Pizarro, and accused him of supporting a Portuguese protectorate under the authority of Charlotte Joaquina. Military command fell to Colonel Juan Antonio Alvarez de Arenales who, due to uncertainty as to who should be in charge of the civilian affairs, also exercised some civil powers. On 16 July, in the city of La Paz, a second revolutionary movement led by Colonel Pedro Domingo Murillo forced the governor to resign and replaced him with a Junta, the "Junta Tuitiva de los Derechos del Pueblo" ("Junta, keeper of the rights of the people"), headed by Murillo.

A quick reaction from the Spanish officials soon defeated these rebellions. An army with 1,000 men sent from Buenos Aires found no resistance at Chuquisaca, took control of the city, and deposed the Junta. Similarly, Murillo's 800 men were completely outnumbered by the more than 5,000 men sent from Lima. He was later beheaded along with other leaders and their heads exhibited to the people as deterrent. The measures taken against those revolutions reinforced the feeling of inequity among Criollos, more so because they greatly contrasted against the pardon that Martín de Álzaga and others received after serving just a few time in jail. This further deepened the resentment of the locals against the peninsular Spaniards. Among others, Juan José Castelli was present at the proceedings of the University of Saint Francis Xavier where the Syllogism of Chuquisaca was developed. This would greatly influence his position during the May week.

On 25 November 1809 Cisneros created the Political Surveillance Court with the aim of pursuing the supporters of "French ideologies", and those who encouraged the creation of political regimes that opposed the dependence on Spain. However, he rejected a proposal of the economist José María Romero to banish a number of people which were considered dangerous to the Spanish regime: Saavedra, Paso, Chiclana, Vieytes, Balcarce, Castelli, Larrea, Guido, Viamonte, Moreno, Sáenz and Belgrano, among many others. All these measures, and a proclamation issued by the Viceroy to prevent the spreading of news that might be considered subversive, made the Criollos think that a formal pretext would be enough to take actions that would lead to the outbreak of a revolution. In April 1810, Cornelio Saavedra expressed his famous quote to his friends: It's not time yet, let the figs ripen and then we'll eat them.

=== May Revolution ===
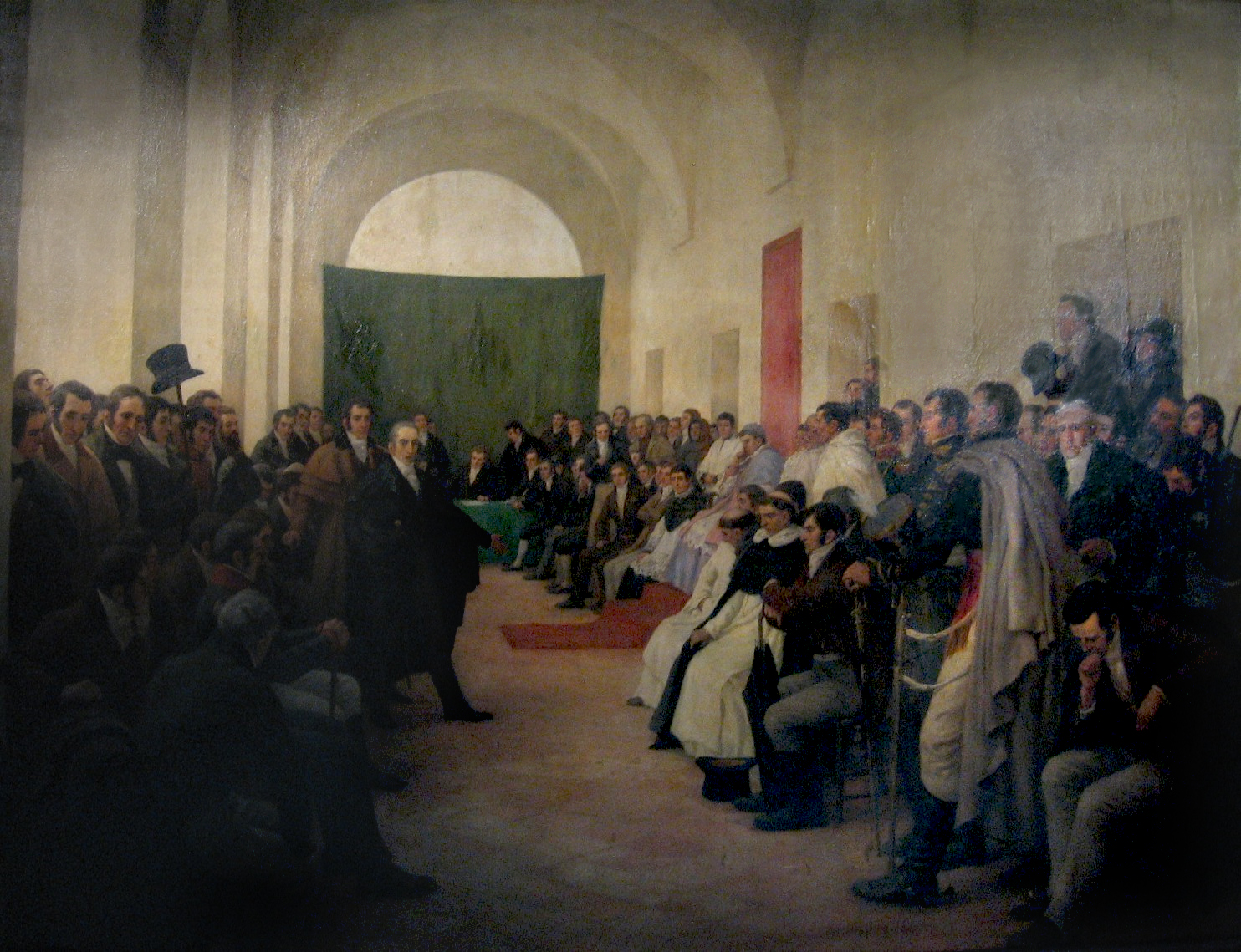
The open cabildo of 22 May.

The news of the fall of the Junta of Seville reached Buenos Aires in May 1810. With both the king of Spain and the Junta removed of power, many people thought that Cisneros had no legitimacy to govern, starting the May Revolution. Cisneros tried to calm down the population, to no avail. He called the commanders of the local armies and requested their support, but they denied it. Cisneros was ultimately forced to allow an open cabildo, which would discuss what to do. Although those meetings were usually composed of the wealthiest population, the army and a group of rioters plotted to prevent the entry of many wealthy people and allow common people instead.

The open cabildo decided to end the mandate of viceroy Cisneros, and establish a government Junta instead. However, the Cabildo tweaked the will of the open cabildo, and appointed Cisneros as president of the Junta; he would remain in power, albeit under a new title. The Junta made the oath of office, but popular unrest became uncontrollable. By the end of the same day the Junta was appointed, the members resigned, and Cisneros did so as well. Initially, the Cabildo rejected his resignation, but the popular unrest was so high that the Cabildo itself was partially overrun by the rioters. Cisneros' resignation was finally accepted, and the Primera Junta was appointed instead, with members proposed by the people. Once deposed, Cisneros dispatched a messenger to Córdoba, to inform the former viceroy of the events, and bestowing on him the authority to gather an army and depose the Junta.

=== Return to Spain ===
After being deposed, Cisneros formally became a common citizen in Buenos Aires, under the protection of the Junta. A few days later, he assisted to a mass in honour of the king Ferdinand VII. However, the Junta distrusted him, so he was banished to the Canary Islands, along with the members of the Royal Audiencia of Buenos Aires, under the pretext that his life was in danger. His wife Inés de Gaztambide stayed in Buenos Aires as his representative, but she left the city afterwards and moved to Montevideo. Montevideo, a city that rejected the Junta of Buenos Aires, welcomed her like a queen. The Liniers counter-revolution was completely defeated by the forces from Buenos Aires, and Liniers captured and executed.

Once in Spain, Cisneros moved to Cádiz, to submit himself to the trial of residence. The government had no complaints about his rule, and promoted him to general captain of Cádiz. He was jailed during an uprising in Spain, and liberated after the return of Ferdinand VII. He was then appointed general captain of his home city of Cartagena in 1823, and died in 1829.

== Bibliography ==
- National Academy of History of Argentina (2010). Revolución en el Plata (in Spanish). Buenos Aires: Emece. ISBN 978-950-04-3258-0.
- Belgrano, Manuel; Felipe Pigna (2009). Manuel Belgrano: Autobiografía y escritos económicos. Buenos Aires: Planeta. ISBN 978-950-04-3189-7.
- Pigna, Felipe (2007). Los mitos de la historia argentina (in Spanish) (26 ed.). Argentina: Grupo Editorial Norma. ISBN 978-987-545-149-0.
- Luna, Félix (2004). Grandes protagonistas de la Historia Argentina: Mariano Moreno (in Spanish). Buenos Aires: La Nación. ISBN 950-49-1248-6.
- Abad de Santillán, Diego. Historia Argentina (in Spanish). Buenos Aires: TEA (Tipográfica Editora Argentina).
- Saavedra, Cornelio (2009). Memoria autógrafa. Buenos Aires: Editorial del nuevo extremo. ISBN 978-987-609-171-8.
- Scenna, Miguel Ángel (2009). Mariano Moreno. Buenos Aires: H. Garetto Editor. ISBN 978-987-1494-05-4.

Government offices
Preceded by Santiago de Liniers	Viceroy of the Río de la Plata; 1809–1810	Succeeded by Francisco Javier de Elío
