= Matías de Irigoyen =

Argentine soldier and politician

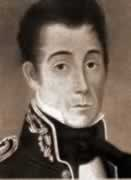
- Born: Matías Ramón de Irigoyen de la Quintana; 25 February 1781; Buenos Aires, Viceroyalty of the Río de la Plata
- Died: 20 September 1839 (aged 58); Buenos Aires, Argentina

Matías de Irigoyen (25 February 1781 – 20 September 1839) was an Argentine military officer and politician. Trained in the Spanish Navy and present at the Battle of Trafalgar, he returned to Buenos Aires in 1809 and joined the revolutionary cause after the May Revolution. He was dispatched on the first diplomatic mission to Britain in 1810; later he briefly formed part of a provisional executive named in April 1815, served as capitán del puerto (Captain of the Port) of Buenos Aires (1815–1816), and held senior wartime posts including Secretary (Minister) of War and Navy during the Directorial period. In February 1820, amid the political crisis following the Battle of Cepeda, he briefly served as interim governor in Buenos Aires before the installation of Manuel de Sarratea.

== Early life and naval career ==
Irigoyen was born in Buenos Aires in 1781. As a youth he travelled to Spain, where he trained in the Navy (notably at El Ferrol) and served as a midshipman during the Battle of Trafalgar (1805). He returned to Buenos Aires in 1809 and supported the revolutionary movement after May 1810.

== Diplomatic mission to Britain (1810) ==
The revolutionary Junta appointed Irigoyen to lead its first mission to London in 1810. His brief included seeking British goodwill, military supplies and protection against Portuguese moves from Brazil. The mission engaged with Lord Strangford (British envoy at Rio de Janeiro) and the Marquess Wellesley at the Foreign Office, within the constraints of British policy toward Spain and Spanish America at the time.

== Government posts ==
Following the resignation of Carlos María de Alvear in April 1815, the General Assembly named a short-lived provisional executive including José de San Martín and Irigoyen; the body never effectively assumed power.

In October 1815 Irigoyen replaced Martín Thompson as Captain of the Port of Buenos Aires, serving until 1816. In July 1816, pending the arrival of the newly elected Supreme Director Juan Martín de Pueyrredón, he formed part (alongside Antonio José de Escalada) of an interim Comisión Gubernativa that temporarily carried the executive authority in Buenos Aires.

During the Directorial governments he served as Secretary (Minister) of War and Navy, a role documented in contemporary records and later naval chronicles.

== Crisis of 1820 ==
After the defeat of the Directorial army at Cepeda (1 February 1820) and the collapse of central authority, Buenos Aires reorganised its institutions. On 11 February the Cabildo initiated the transition to a provincial government. Irigoyen's brother Miguel acted briefly as interim governor until the assumption of Manuel de Sarratea later that month.

== Later life ==
Irigoyen remained active in naval-administrative posts. In May 1821 he was appointed to head the Comandancia General de Marina (General Command of the Navy), a position he received the following day from Col. Perdriel. He died in Buenos Aires on 20 September 1839.

== Legacy ==
The Argentine Navy named a vessel in his honour, the ARA Comandante General Irigoyen (A-1), today preserved as a museum ship in San Pedro (Buenos Aires Province).
