= Provisional governorship of José Rondeau =

Pre-Constitution government period of Uruguay

- Provisional governorship of José Rondeau; 22 December 1828 – 17 April 1830
- Governor: José Rondeau
- Cabinet: See list
- Party: None
- Appointed by: Constitutional Assembly

The provisional governorship of José Rondeau was the pre-Constitution government period of Uruguay which began with his oath and inauguration as the Governor and Captain General of Uruguay, recently becoming independent and also known as the State of Montevideo, after being summoned by the Constitutional and Legislative General Assembly to take office, and lasted until 17 April 1830 with his resignation.

== Background ==
In order to put an end to the Cisplatine War that disputed the sovereignty of the Oriental Province and the Oriental Missions territories, the United Provinces of the River Plate and the Empire of Brazil signed in August 1828 a Preliminar Peace Convention, agreeing to resign from their claims to the State of Montevideo and to declare it as an independent country.

Once the convention was ratified by each of the contracting parties, by Brazil on 30 August, signed by Lavalleja on 20 September, and by the United Provinces on 29 September, with the exchange of letters on 4 October 1828 the treaty came into force and according to its provisions the newly created state had to call for elections for representatives, to establish a government and to draft the new Constitution. During this same month the elections were performed and on 22 November the new Assembly was formed, and on 24 November this legislative body declared itself as a Constitutional Assembly.

The next step of the Assembly was to set up the Provisional Executive, which was a priority issue because there were still occupying forces from Brazil in Montevideo collecting taxes and customs' rights detrimental to Uruguayan's finances, and in order to quickly activate the commerce. A first proposal by representative Lázaro Gadea was submitted, suggesting the creation a collective Executive of two or more persons, natural citizens in full possession of their rights, in order to reconcile the different factions, specially the strong ones led by Juan Antonio Lavalleja and Fructuoso Rivera, (opposing each other) but the Commission on Constitution and Law of the Assembly rejected this proposal. Instead, a decree was passed where in order to be Governor and Provisional Captain General it was only required "to be born within the territories of the so far called United Provinces of the River Plate", indirectly referring to Rondeau, who was already mentioned as a potential candidate in private meetings of several members of the Assembly, but also because the political elite considered that was not considered convenient in the long term to choose among the two strong personalities of Rivera or Lavalleja. Therefore, the name of a high-ranking official such as Rondeau started to be considered, because he was disconnected from the country in a way the political elite could establish a government free from the ups and downs of the caudillo movements, and to choose someone like-minded unitarian tendencies.

On 1 December 1828 the Assembly appointed as the future Provisional Governor to José Rondeau, but because he was in Buenos Aires at that time, they chose to cover the vacancy Joaquín Suárez as interim Governor until Rondeau came to Uruguay. On 22 December 1828 Rondeau appeared before the Assembly to swear the oath and to take office, and pledged to perform his duty well and loyally, in compliance with laws and to enforce them, taking care of people's safety and property's rights, to defend the liberty, independence and political system of the country, and Rondeau answered affirmatively.

Uruguayan historian Carlos Machado commented regarding the appointment of Rondeau as the next Governor, describing it as an "unfortunate decision", because he was not even born in the Eastern side of Uruguay River, he had precedents of confrontations with the Artigas militia in 1813 and later with the Federal League in a battle he lost, ending up outside the revolution, and he did not portray a neutral part between the caudillos Lavalleja and Rivera who were fighting over the power. The latter also because he ended up appointing in most of the high positions to Rivera comrades what later would origin a political crisis.

== Cabinet ==
As soon as he took office, José Rondeau appointed Francisco Giró as the Minister Secretary of Government and Foreign Relations, and was also appointed as interim Minister of Finance and of War. On 26 December 1828 appointed Eugenio Garzón as Minister of War. When the intention of Rondeau to suppress the military commandancies of the departments, which at that time were led by military officers supporting Lavalleja who was already an important person, Giró and Garzón (Garzón himself supported Lavalleja) expressed their intentions to resign. This led to a political crisis where Rondeau even asked the Constitutional Assembly for help by sending them any politician to take office of any of the Ministries. At the end the controversy was solved when Rondeau cancelled his plan to suppress the commandancies, and Giró and Garzón returned to their positions. On 8 January 1829 Rondeau appointed Francisco Joaquín Muñoz as Minister of Finance, and thus he completed the Cabinet. In February 1829 Rondeau appointed Fructuoso Rivera as Chief of the Defense Staff of the Army after a meeting with him, where Rivera offered his support and of the forces under his command, but actually it was another strategy that Rivera leveraged to further build up his political ambitions. In August resigned the original ministers and therefore Rondeau designated Rivera as a "universal" minister in charge of all the Ministries.

== Domestic policy ==
On 24 April 1829 the remaining forces of Brazilian Army stationed in Montevideo left the city so by this date ended the Brazilian occupation of Uruguay that until then the rest of Uruguay other than Montevideo was already under Oriental control. Some days later the Constitutional Assembly moved to Montevideo to meet in the Cabildo and on 1 May also reached the city Governor Rondeau with his Ministers.

=== Legal and constitutional matters ===
The so-called "Northern Army" which was led by Fructuoso Rivera during the Campaign for the Oriental Missions was declared as a public force of the country and "belonging to the Montevideo State's Army", as provided by Law of 2 January 1829.

The first version of the coat of arms was approved in 1829.

On 19 March 1829 a law was passed that created the coat of arms of Uruguay, which was similar to the current coat of arms but with military pieces added:

The coat of arms of the State shall be an ellipse crowned by a sun and divided in quarters: with a weighing scale as a symbol of equality and justice, over an azure tincture placed in the upper right quarter; in the left side the Hill of Montevideo as a symbol of strength, over an argent field; in the lower right quarter a free horse as a symbol of liberty, over an argent field, and in the left quarter to it, over an azure tincture, an ox as a symbol of abundance. Adorning the shield there are military, navy and commerce trophies.

— Law of 19 March 1829.

On 4 June 1829 a law on freedom of the press was passed, acknowledging this principle and allowing any citizen to publish in the press their thoughts freely and without any prior censorship. Also regulated the trials in case of abusive usage of the right of freedom of the press.

On 10 September 1829 the Constitutional Assembly sanctioned the Constitution of Uruguay and it was sent to the Argentina and Brazil plenipotentiaries to be inspected in the case they would consider any of its provisions would go against their respective public safety, as it was agreed in the Preliminary Peace Convention.

On 1 April 1830 a new law on elections was passed, to arrange the elections of Representatives, Senators and members of Economic-Administrative Boards (Department's system of governments following the Cabildo's system). The election of Representatives was directly performed by the citizens, an improvement regarding the former system of indirect election. The Senators were to be elected indirectly by an electoral "College of Senators", whose members in turn were to be elected by the citizens. The members of Departmental bodies was also direct by the citizens as well.

=== Political crisis ===
The struggle of political intentions between different factions, the Unitarians, the supporters of Lavalleja and the supporters of Rivera, led to a political crisis that called into question Rondeau administration and finished with his resignation. One of the causes of the crisis was the growing presence in high positions of the government of the abrasilerados (supporters of Portuguese and later Brazilian occupation of Oriental Province during the Cisplatine regime). This was set up first with a political strategy of oblivion and forgiveness towards Rivera and his allies, because until recently they had supported the province's annexation and occupation by the foreign government of the Empire of Portugal and later the Empire of Brazil, and to make peace with Lavalleja. On 25 August 1829 Rivera reached Montevideo and demanded the resignation of pro-Unitarian ministers Garzón and Muñoz, while Giró have already resigned. After these resignations on 27 August, Rondeau appointed Rivera as the "universal" Minister on 29 August, designating Lavalleja as the Chief of the Defense Staff of the Army. The Constitutional Assembly did not allowed the request to merge the Ministries under a single administration under the pretext of budget cutting, but allowed to merge the Ministries of War and Government. Therefore, Rivera was in charge of War, Foreign Relations and Government while Jacinto Acuña de Figueroa was in charge of the Ministry of Finance until 26 October, when he was replaced by Lucas Obes. Santiago Vázquez was designated as a diplomat after Argentina and Nicolás Herrera also as a diplomat but after Brazil. At this point, the highest positions in the Executive were under the hands of the abrasilerados, a situation that the Constitutional Assembly did not like due to their Unitarian leaders were displaced and Rivera gained the power and the control of finances.

Another triggering incident was the project to disestablish the Colony of Cuareim, established by Rivera and settled with Guaraní families who followed him after the Campaign of Rivera at the Misiones Orientales, which despite the request for economic support for the settlement on 1 April 1830, the Assembly required expenditure receipts of the first budget assignment made on 13 May 1829, and also the continuity of the colony itself was discussed. The Minister Ellauri as representative of the Executive stood up for the continuity of the colony and to grant them economic support for their care and to prevent riots, while members of the Assembly Lamas, Llambí and Uturbey proposed its disestablishment, and in order to do that representative Pérez submitted a motion. At this point, Rivera threatened the supporters of the disestablishment of the Colony of Cuareim and asked the Executive to allow the mobilization of the Battalion of Hunters, which the Executive allowed. When on 16 April this troop was about to leave the city to go to campaign, the Assembly ordered to suspend this departure and asked the Executive for explanations why they allowed this, that representative Lapido told there was no reason to mobilize the battalion. Minister of Government Ellauri excused himself on the basis of technicalities. Representative Lapido insisted that the government should give explanations of the purpose of this troop's mobilization, accusing the Executive of overspending in expenses of military high positions created despite those were not expressly allowed to be created, or to spend above the designated budged during a time with an exhausted treasury, what could led to distrust of the government. These criticisms affected the Rondeau administration and were linked to measures taken to favor Rivera. In the end, the Assembly ordered to suspend the departure of the battalion until de Minister of War appear after the Assembly to give explanations.

== End of term and resignation of Rondeau ==
Under a situation of high political crisis, after the Minister of War did not attend to offer explanations of why Rivera wanted the mobilization of the Battalion of Hunters, on 17 April 1830 Governor Rondeau submitted his letter of resignation after the Constitutional Assembly where he explained that the critical situation led to the resignation of his ministers and if the Assembly members wanted it, he would resign from his tenure. The Assembly soon accepted his resignation and immediately received Lavalleja to take his oath and appoint him as the new Governor. Rondeau handed over peacefully but under protest, stating that he felt forced to do that in order to keep the requirements of internal peace of the Preliminar Peace Convention and because the Constitutional Assembly would not be authorized to exercise powers of the Executive.

== Bibliography ==
- Acevedo, Eduardo (1919). Historia del Uruguay. Vol. II: abarca los gobiernos de Lavalleja, Rondeau, Rivera y Oribe, desde 1825 hasta 1838. Montevideo: Imprenta Nacional.
- Armand Ugon, E.; Cerdeiras Alonso, J. C.; Arcos Ferrand, L.; Goldaracena, C., eds. (1930). Compilación de Leyes y Decretos 1825-1930. Vol. I (1825–1834). Montevideo: IMPO.
- Castellanos, Alfredo (2011). Historia Uruguaya. Vol. 5: La Cisplatina, la independencia y la República Caudillesca. Montevideo: Ediciones de la Banda Oriental. ISBN 978-9974-1-0454-9.
- Reyes Abadie, Washington; Vázquez Romero, Andrés (1986). Crónica general del Uruguay. Vol. 2. Montevideo: Ediciones de la Banda Oriental.
