= Gaspar de Vigodet =

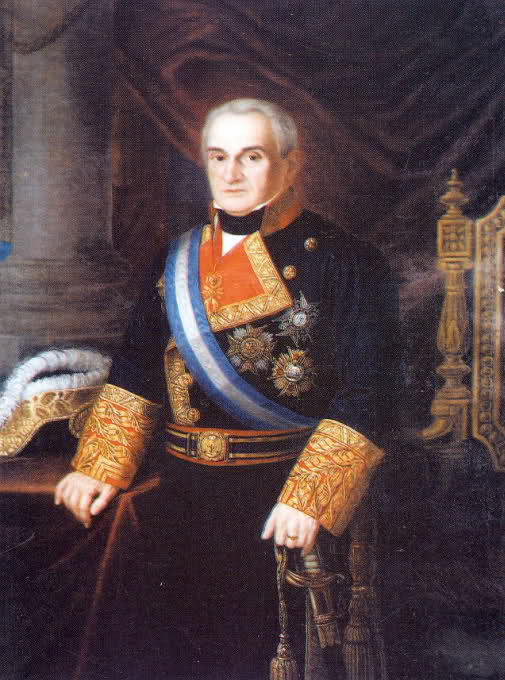
Gaspar de Vigodet

Gaspar de Vigodet (1764–1837) was a Spanish military officer who served as last Royalist Governor of Montevideo.

== Early career ==
In September 1782, Vigodet participated, as a volunteer cadet, in the Great Siege of Gibraltar (1779–1783) before being transferred to the Regiment of Murcia the following month, and becoming a second lieutenant in 1783.

In 1791 he was sent to Oran and was promoted to lieutenant that same year.

Returning to Spain, he was transferred to the Army of Rosellón, participating in several combats and battles of the War of the Pyrenees, including, in 1793, the Battle of Villelongue-dels-Monts, the Battle of the Black Mountain and Port-Vendres, St. Elme y Collioure. The following year, he distinguished himself defending St. Elme, receiving three sable wounds and a bayonet wound and being taken prisoner. He was promoted to captain the following July.

In February 1797, Vigodet boarded the 112-gun three-decker ship of the line, Conde de Regla to take part in the Battle of Cape St. Vincent (1797) and later that same month participated in the defence of Cádiz. As a member of Mazarredo's fleet, he saw service in Brest, returning to Spain in 1802.

In May 1805, he was promoted to captain of fusiliers in the Africa Regiment and in February 1806, a commander-in-chief of Paraguay, post he was unable to occupy due to the war against England.

== Peninsular War ==
At the start of the war, Vigodet joined General Castaños's general staff, and participated at the Battle of Bailén, being promoted to colonel the following month, and going on to fight at the Battle of Tudela.

In January 1809, Vigodet served under General Venegas at Uclés and under Duke of Alburquerque at Mora and Consuegra. He was promoted to Infantry brigadier the following March.

In June 1809, as part of General Venegas's Army of La Mancha, Vigodet commanded the 2nd Division, then numbering 4,667 troops, and which fought the following month at Almonacid and the following November at Ocana, both battles resulting in defeat for the Spanish forces.

== Montevideo ==
In July 1810, he was appointed Governor of Montevideo, to stop the advance of the Independentist rebels forces of Río de la Plata. By October 1812 the entire region was under control of the rebels, except for the city of Montevideo itself, which was besieged. On December 31, Vigodet broke out of the city but was defeated in the Battle of Cerrito.

Supplied from over the sea, the city still held out until May 17, 1814, when the naval victories of Admiral William Brown, cut off the supply route and the city faced starvation. By the end of June, Vigodet was forced to surrender Montevideo to General Carlos María de Alvear.

The following years he stayed in Rio de Janeiro, where he tried to take revenge on Alvear, who was also exiled to this city, due to political differences.

He was appointed Captain-General of Castille in 1817, and member of the Liberal Regency during the Trienio Liberal. When King Ferdinand VII of Spain was restored in 1823, de Vigodet went into exile in France, from where he could only return in 1834, after the death of the King.

== See also ==
- Second Siege of Montevideo
- Dissolution of the Viceroyalty of the Río de la Plata
