= Juan José Quesada =

Argentine military officer (1790–1832)

Juan José Quesada (1790 in Corrientes, Argentina – April 1832 in Montevideo, Uruguay) was a colonel of Argentina. He joined the regiment of dragoons, took part in the siege of Montevideo, and operated in the Upper Peru under the command of José Rondeau and Martín Miguel de Güemes. He fought with San Martín in the campaigns in Chile and Peru, and fought in the war against Brazil. He died in Montevideo on April 13, 1832.

== Legacy ==
A street in central Montevideo, Coronel Juan José Quesada, has been named after Quesada.
