= Joaquín Pinto =

Ecuadorian painter

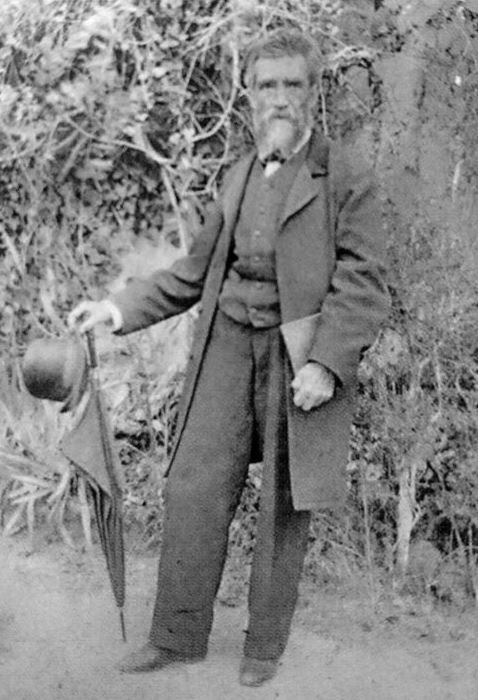
Joaquín in c. 1920

Joaquín Pinto (18 August 1842 – 24 June 1906) was an Ecuadorian painter.

== Biography ==
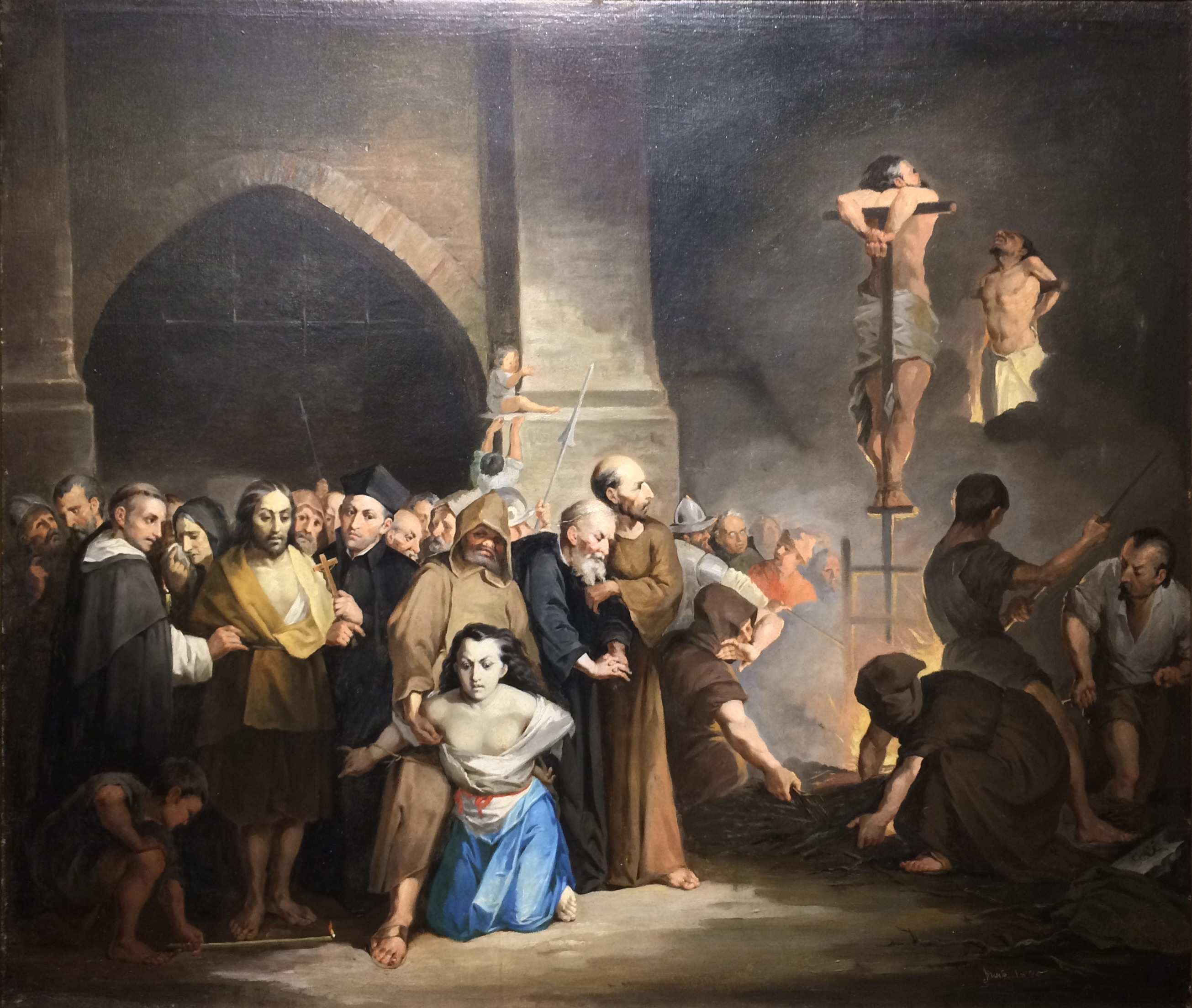
The Inquisition (1895), oil painting. MuNa, Quito.

Pinto was born 18 August 1842, in Quito, Ecuador, to José Pinto y Valdemoros and Encarnación Ortiz y Cevallos.

A precocious child, Pinto began drawing in his first years of school. He was taught art by Cipriano Borja, Ramón Vargas, Rafael Vanegas, Andrés Acosta, Tomás Camacho, Santos Cevallos, and Antonio Salas. The latter was considered one of the best painters of his time. Pinto's family became poor following the 1853 death of his father. To earn money, Pinto began to give classes in culture, while continuing his art studies.

Pinto married Eufemia Berrio in 1876. Soon after, he began to specialize in engraving. In 1877, Pinto illustrated Federico González Suárez's book Estudio Histórico Sobre los Cañaris. Juan Manosalvas taught Pinto watercolor technique, though Pinto soon surpassed Manosalvas in talent. At the turn of the 20th century, his indigenous costumbrismo was popular both in Ecuador and abroad. His notable clients included Rogelio Bonnal and the French minister Hipólito Fandiu.

In 1903, Pinto taught in Cuenca's Escuela de Pintura. Beginning in 1904, he taught painting in Quito's Escuela de Bellas Artes.

Pinto's notable paintings include "San Juan en su Visión Apocalíptica de la Virgen", "La Virgen María, en su Advocación de Nuestra Señora de la Merced", "El Indio de la Magdalena", "Vista al Cráter del Pichincha desde Capillampa", "Soliloquio de María", "Entierro del Niño Indio", "El Chimborazo", "Cara-Ajos", "Transverberación de Santa Teresa", and a portrait of his lifelong friend González Suárez.

Pinto died in Quito on 25 June 1906.
