= Miguel Estanislao Soler =

Argentine general

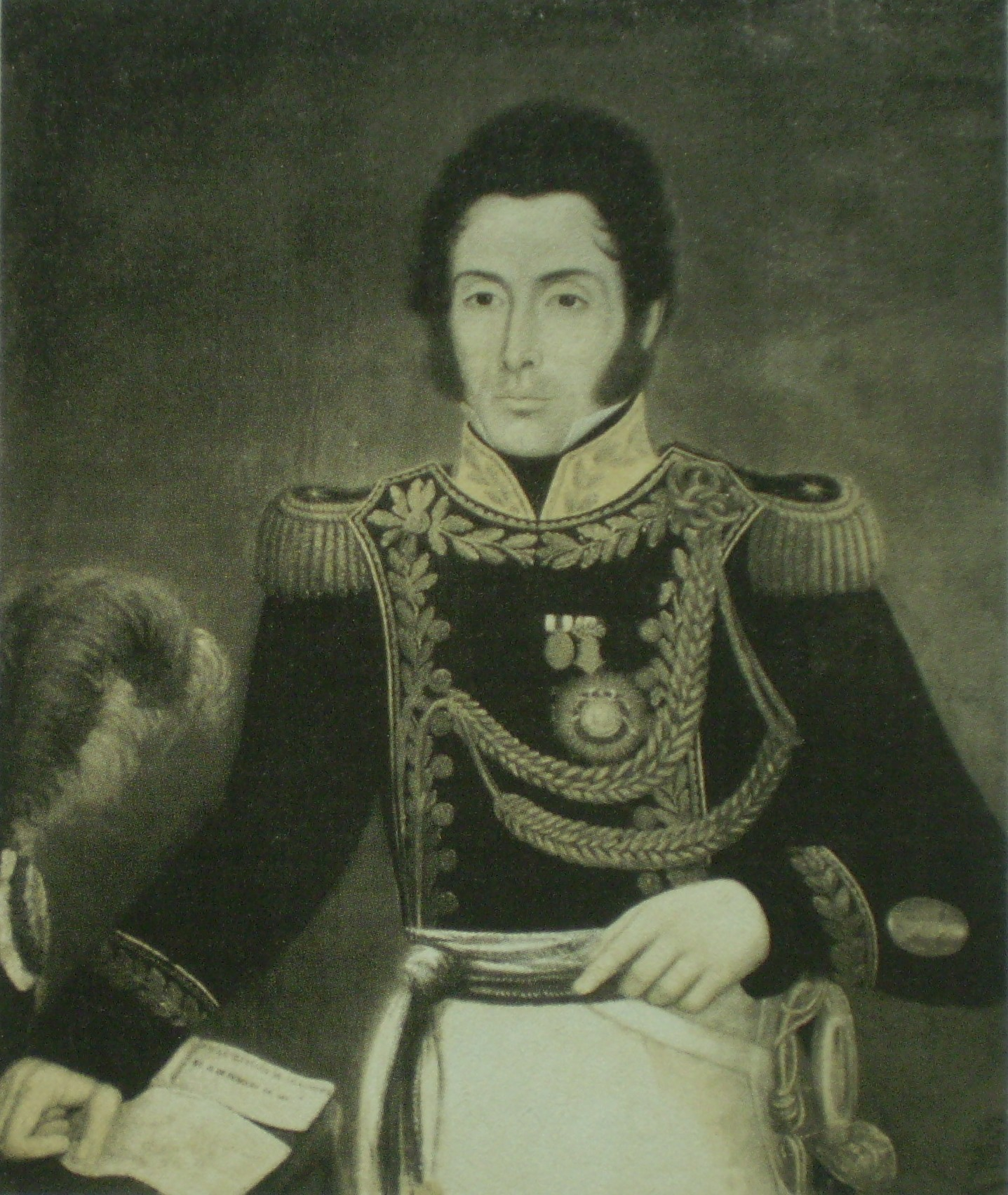

Governor of Buenos Aires Province
- In office 20 June 1820 – 29 June 1820
- Preceded by: Ildefonso Ramos Mexía
- Succeeded by: Manuel Dorrego

Personal details
- Born: 7 May 1783 Buenos Aires, Viceroyalty of the Río de la Plata
- Died: 23 September 1849 (aged 66) San Isidro, Buenos Aires Province

Military service
- Battles/wars: Argentine War of Independence; Siege of Montevideo; Chilean War of Independence; Battle of Chacabuco; Argentine Civil Wars; Battle of Cañada de la Cruz; Cisplatine War; Battle of Ituzaingó

Miguel Estanislao Soler (7 May 1783 – 23 September 1849) was an Argentine general, who fought in the Argentine War of Independence. He served originally with the Spanish royal army and fought against the British invasions of the River Plate but supported the 1810 May Revolution and fought for the patriots in the resulting war. He was appointed governor of the Banda Oriental by Buenos Aires in 1814 before serving with the Army of the Andes in the war for Chilean independence. He was briefly one of the governors of Buenos Aires Province after the collapse of the supreme directorship. He fought against Brazil in the 1825-27 Cisplatine War.

== Biography ==
Soler was born in Buenos Aires in the Spanish Viceroyalty of the Río de la Plata on 7 May 1783. His father was a lieutenant colonel in the King's Dragoons and his mother was from Buenos Aires. Soler studied at the Royal College of San Carlos until he left to join the Buenos Aires Fixed Infantry Regiment in 1795 as a cadet. He fought against the 1806-1807 British invasions of the River Plate and was promoted to second lieutenant. In 1808 he was appointed as captain in the Castes Battalion for men of mixed descent and the following year fought against the Mutiny of Álzaga.

Soler supported the 1810 May Revolution and in its aftermath became a major of his unit, which had become the Regiment of Pardos and Morenos. He saw action in combat against Royalist forces in Entre Ríos Province and the Banda Oriental. He was promoted to lieutenant-colonel in 1813.

In 1814 he was appointed governor of the Banda Oriental. In May 1815 he became colonel of the Grenadier Infantry Regiment and served with the Army of the Andes in Chile. He was appointed quartermaster general of the army in 1816. In 1819 he returned to Buenos Aires and became chief of the general staff.

Soler became increasingly involved in politics, particular as the supreme directorship collapsed as a result of the Arequito revolt in 1820. In June that year Soler became one of three governors of the Buenos Aires Province but was soon deposed by force.

In 1823 he went as envoy to the Portuguese and Brazilian forces engaged in the Siege of Montevideo. During 1825-1827 he fought against Brazil in the Cisplatine War. In 1829 was appointed to form the 4th Regiment of Patricians and sat on the advisory council to the governor of Buenos Aires, before resigning both positions due to political disagreements. Soler settled for a period in Banda Oriental (modern Uruguay) but returned to Buenos Aires in 1837. He died on 23 September 1849.
