= Historia Argentina =

Historia Argentina (in English, History of Argentina) in an encyclopedia of three volumes by Diego Abad de Santillán, published in 1965 by TEA (Tipográfica Editora Argentina).

== Content ==
The encyclopedia is devoted to the history of Argentina. The first chapters, however, talk about the origin of the human race, the early migrations that populated America, the Pre-Columbian populations in modern Argentina, and the voyages of Christopher Columbus to América.

History of Argentina itself begins to be narrated from the discovery of the Río de la Plata by Juan Díaz de Solís, and follows to the sanction of the Sáenz Peña Law and the first presidential mandate of Hipólito Yrigoyen.
