= Charles Fouqueray =

French painter (1869–1956)

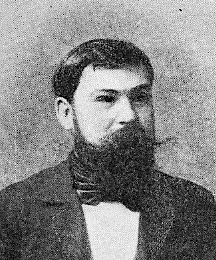
Charles Fouqueray

Charles Dominique Fouqueray (Le Mans, 23 April 1869 – 28 March 1956) was a French painter. He studied at the École des Beaux Arts in Paris under Alexandre Cabanel and Fernand Cormon. From 1908 he was Peintre de la Marine, following the career of his father, a naval officer. He was recipient of the 1909 Prix Rosa Bonheur, then in 1914 the first Prix de l'Indochine.
