= Manuel de Sarratea =

Argentine politician and diplomat (1774–1849)

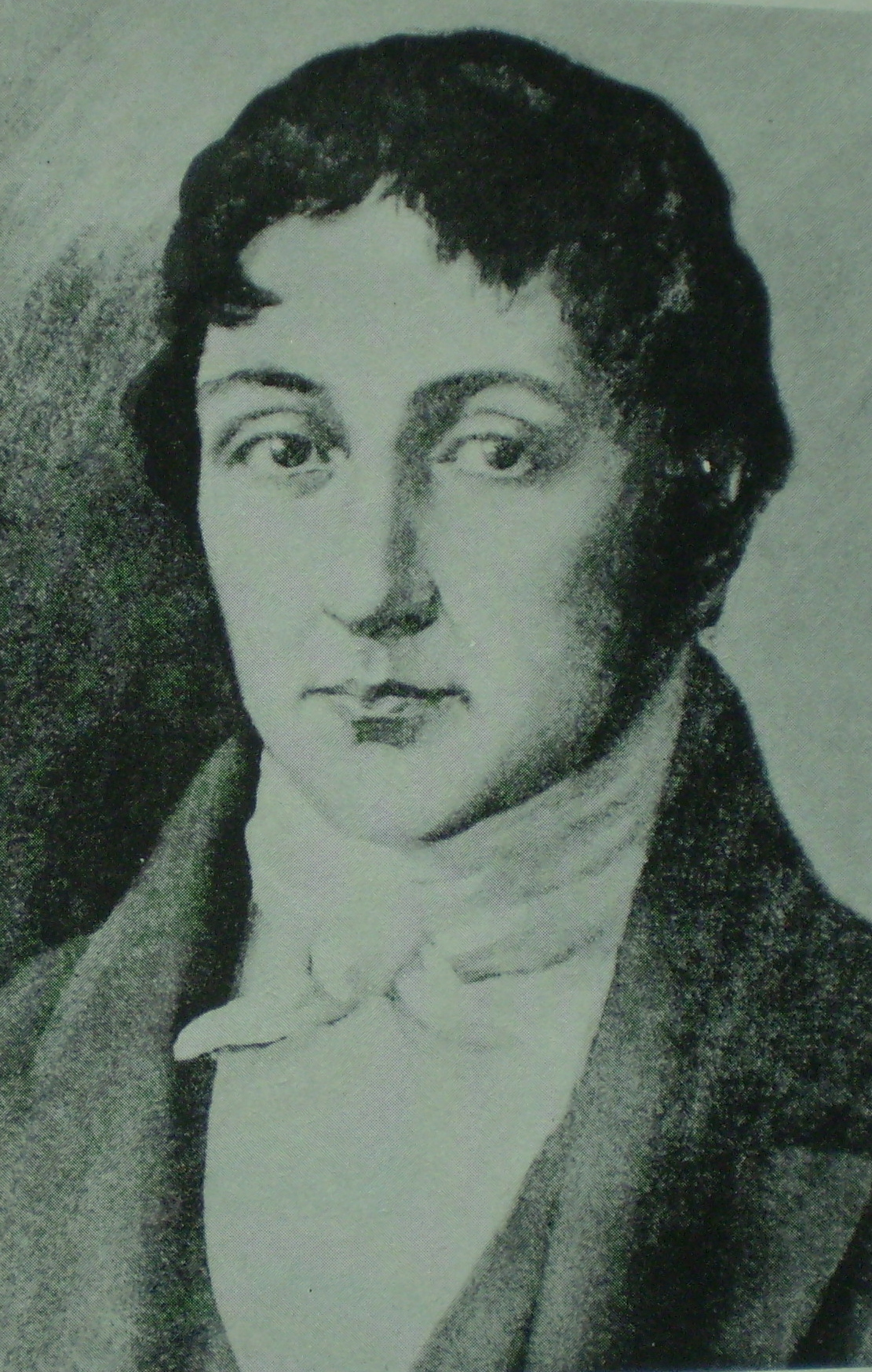

Governor of Buenos Aires Province
- In office 18 February 1820 – 6 March 1820
- Preceded by: Matías de Irigoyen
- Succeeded by: Juan Ramón Balcarce

Governor of Buenos Aires Province
- In office 11 March 1820 – 2 May 1820
- Preceded by: Juan Ramón Balcarce
- Succeeded by: Ildefonso Ramos Mexía

Member of the First Triumvirate
- In office 23 September 1811 – 8 October 1812
- Preceded by: Office established
- Succeeded by: Second Triumvirate

Personal details
- Born: 11 August 1774 Buenos Aires, Viceroyalty of the Río de la Plata
- Died: 21 September 1849 (aged 75) Limoges, France

Manuel Mariano Hipólito de Sarratea y Altolaguirre (11 August 1774 – 21 September 1849) was an Argentine diplomat, politician and soldier. He served in the First Triumvirate (1811–1812) and twice as governor of Buenos Aires Province in 1820, when he signed the Treaty of Pilar. He later held diplomatic posts in Great Britain, Brazil and France.

== Early life and first public roles ==
Sarratea was born in Buenos Aires into a merchant family linked to transatlantic trade networks. He was educated in Spain and returned to the Río de la Plata on the eve of the independence process. He rose to prominence in the post-May Revolution governments and on 23 September 1811 became one of the three members of the First Triumvirate, with Feliciano A. Chiclana and Juan José Paso.

== Diplomatic activity, 1814–1816 ==
After the restoration of Ferdinand VII of Spain (1814), Sarratea undertook diplomatic missions in Europe. Contemporary and later studies describe negotiations around constitutional-monarchical options considered in London and Madrid in 1815–1816.

== Buenos Aires governor (1820) ==
Following the defeat of the Directorio at the Battle of Cepeda and the dissolution of central authorities, Buenos Aires established a provincial government. Sarratea was appointed governor on 18 February 1820. On 23 February he signed, with Estanislao López and Francisco Ramírez, the Treaty of Pilar, which provided a framework for peace among the provinces and envisaged the convocation of a federal congress.

Documents preserved by the Buenos Aires municipal library include orders related to confidential clauses of the treaty, such as the delivery of arms to federal forces (Buenos Aires, 4 March 1820). Military resistance in the capital forced Sarratea to resign on 6 March; Juan Ramón Balcarce served briefly, after which Sarratea resumed office from 11 March to 2 May 1820, being succeeded by Ildefonso Ramos Mexía. For the subsequent institutional transition, contemporary broadsides document Ramos Mejía’s enactments and the provisional arrangements of June 1820.

== Later diplomacy ==
Sarratea returned to diplomatic service in the 1820s. Archival inventories record him as Encargado de Negocios in London (1825–1827), within the framework of relations established by the 1825 Treaty of Amity, Commerce and Navigation. Under Juan Manuel de Rosas he was appointed minister plenipotentiary to the Court of Rio de Janeiro during the French blockade (1838), a mission analyzed in recent scholarship.

== Death ==
Sarratea died in Limoges, France, on 21 September 1849.

== See also ==
- Treaty of Pilar
- First Triumvirate (Argentina)
- Anarquía del Año XX
