= José Rondeau =

Argentine general and statesman (1773–1844)

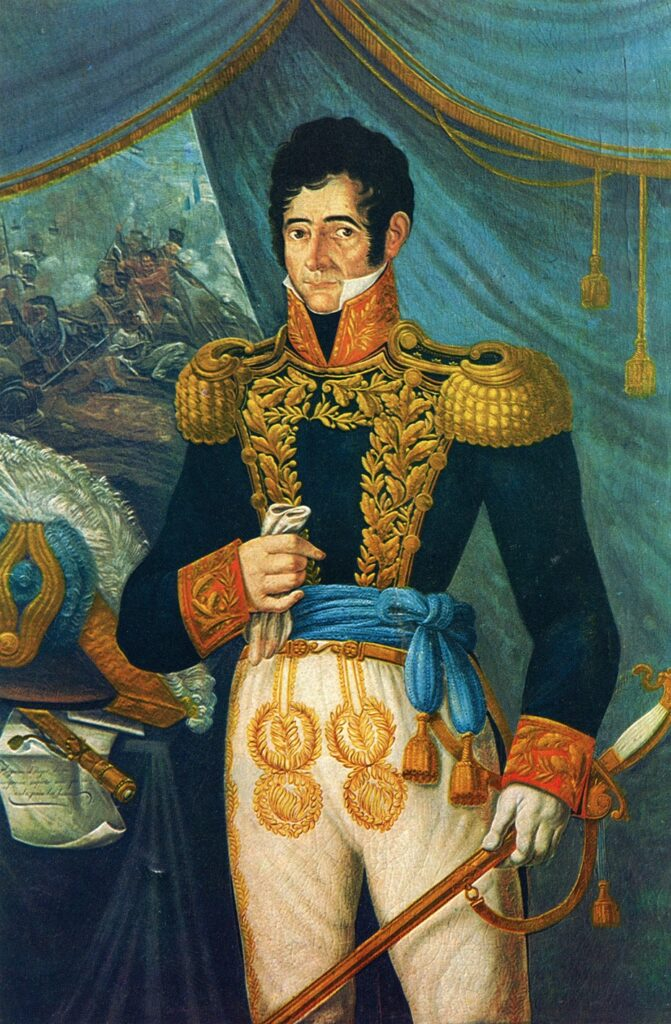
- Portrait by Gaetano Gallino, c. 1820

Supreme Director of the United Provinces of the Río de la Plata
- In office 20 April 1815 – 3 May 1816 (de jure)
- Preceded by: Carlos María de Alvear
- Succeeded by: Ignacio Álvarez Thomas (acting)
- In office 11 June 1819 – 11 February 1820
- Preceded by: Juan Martín de Pueyrredón
- Succeeded by: Juan Pedro Aguirre (acting)

Provisional Governor and Captain General of Uruguay
- In office 22 December 1828 – 17 April 1830
- Preceded by: Joaquín Suárez
- Succeeded by: Juan Antonio Lavalleja

Personal details
- Born: 4 March 1773 Buenos Aires
- Died: 18 November 1844 (aged 71) Montevideo
- Resting place: Central Cemetery of Montevideo
- Party: Unitarian Party; Colorado Party
- Profession: Military officer; politician

José Casimiro Rondeau Pereyra (4 March 1773 – 18 November 1844) was an Argentine-born general and politician who served in senior roles in both Argentina and Uruguay. Chosen as Supreme Director of the United Provinces of the Río de la Plata in April 1815, he did not assume office; he later served as Supreme Director from June 1819 to February 1820. He was Provisional Governor and Captain General of Uruguay between December 1828 and April 1830.

== Early life ==
Rondeau was born in Buenos Aires but soon after his birth, the family moved to Montevideo, where he grew up and went to school. In 1793, he enlisted as a cadet in the Buenos Aires infantry and by 1806 was a captain in the Blandengues of Montevideo. During the British invasion of 1807, he was captured and sent to England. After the defeat of the British troops, he was released and went to Spain, where he fought in the Peninsular War. When he returned to Montevideo in August 1810, he joined the independentist forces and was nominated military leader of the independentist armies of the Banda Oriental, later Uruguay.

== War of Independence ==
Assigned to operations in the Banda Oriental, Rondeau took part in the campaigns around Montevideo (1811; 1812–1814). In 1814, after José de San Martín resigned command of the Army of the North for health reasons, Rondeau was appointed to replace him.

His Third Upper Peru campaign suffered reverses at Venta y Media (October 1815) and at Sipe-Sipe/Viluma (29 November 1815), after which he was relieved in 1816.

== Directorate ==
Following the fall of Carlos María de Alvear in April 1815, the Constituting General Assembly of the provinces of La Plata elected Rondeau their Supreme Director on 20 April, but he did not take office because he was away on campaign; Ignacio Álvarez Thomas served as acting director from May 1815 to April 1816.

After two defeats against the Spanish royalist troops in Peru at Venta y Media and Sipe-Sipe, he was relieved from his command in 1816. He returned to Buenos Aires, where he became governor for a brief stint from 5 June to 30 July 1818.

On 10 June 1819 he became Supreme Director. After the federalist victory at the Battle of Cepeda on 1 February 1820, which precipitated the fall of the directorial regime, Rondeau resigned; Juan Pedro Aguirre briefly acted as his successor in February 1820.

Subsequently, Rondeau retreated to Montevideo and tried to keep out of the internal wars between competing generals of the independentists. Nevertheless, he led several military campaigns against the Indians and in the independence wars against Brazil. In 1828, after the Treaty of Montevideo, he was elected as the governor of the newly founded Eastern Republic of Uruguay. Rondeau occupied this post from December 22, 1828 until April 17, 1830, when he was forced to abdicate by his opponent Juan Antonio Lavalleja, who held the majority in the still young parliament. Lavalleja was named governor ad interim.

Rondeau still served as general in the army, though. In the civil war of Uruguay from 1836 between the Blancos ("White") and the Colorados ("Red"), he fought on the side of the latter and served as their war minister. He was killed in 1844 during the Great Siege of Montevideo.

== See also ==
- Juan José Quesada, colonel to Rondeau
- List of heads of state of Argentina
- List of presidents of Uruguay
