= List of generals of the Empire of Brazil =

This is an incomplete list of all officers who achieved the rank of general-officer in the Empire of Brazil.

== Generals ==
=== Brigadiers ===
- Antônio Manuel de Melo
- Bento Barroso Pereira
- Feliciano Antônio Falcão
- Filipe Néri de Oliveira
- Francisco Carlos de Morais
- Francisco de Paula Massena Rosado
- Francisco José Damasceno Rosado
- Francisco Xavier da Cunha
- Fructuoso Rivera
- Jerônimo Francisco Coelho
- João de Castro Canto e Melo, 2nd Viscount of Castro
- João Gomes da Silveira Mendonça, Marquis of Sabará
- Joaquim Caetano da Silva
- José Manuel Carlos de Gusmão
- José Mariano de Matos
- José de Sá Bittencourt Câmara
- José da Silva Brandão
- Juan José Durán
- Luís Pereira da Nóbrega de Sousa Coutinho
- Manuel Marques de Sousa II
- Martiniano José de Andrade e Silva
- Miguel de Frias e Vasconcelos
- Pedro da Silva Gomes

=== Field marshals ===
- Alexandre Manuel Albino de Carvalho
- Antônio Genelli
- Antônio José Rodrigues
- Antônio Manuel da Silveira Sampaio
- Antônio Nunes de Aguiar
- Ernesto Augusto César Eduardo de Miranda
- Félix José de Matos Pereira de Castro
- Francisco Cláudio Álvares de Andrade
- Francisco Félix da Fonseca Pereira Pinto
- Francisco Sérgio de Oliveira
- Gustavo Henrique Brown
- Henrique Isidoro Xavier de Brito
- Jacinto Pinto de Araújo Correia
- João Carlos Augusto de Oyenhausen-Gravenburg, Marquis of Aracati
- João Eduardo Pereira Colaço Amado
- João Egídio Calmon
- João Jácome de Baumann
- João José da Costa Pimentel
- João Pedro Lecor
- João Propício Mena Barreto, 2nd Baron of São Gabriel
- Joaquim Norberto Xavier de Brito
- José de Abreu, Baron of Cerro Largo
- José Antônio do Passo Bruques
- José Correia Picanço
- José Egídio Gordilho Veloso de Barbuda, 1st Viscount of Camamu
- José Inácio da Silva
- José Joaquim do Couto
- José Leite Pacheco
- José Luís Mena Barreto
- José Manuel de Almeida
- Lopo de Almeida Henriques Botelho e Melo
- Luís Antônio de Oliveira Bulhões
- Luís Manuel de Lima e Silva
- Manuel Antônio Leitão Bandeira
- Manuel Felizardo de Sousa e Melo
- Manuel Inácio de Morais Mesquita Pimentel
- Manuel Jacinto Nogueira da Gama, Viscount of Baependi
- Manuel Marques
- Manuel Muniz Tavares
- Miguel Lino de Morais
- Miguel Nunes Vidigal
- Pedro de Alcântara Bellegarde
- Pedro Labatut
- Raimundo José da Cunha Matos
- Sebastião Barreto Pereira Pinto
- Solidônio José Antônio Pereira do Lago
- Tomás Joaquim Pereira Valente, Count of Rio Pardo
- Venceslau de Oliveira Belo

=== Lieutenant generals ===
- Antero José Ferreira de Brito, Baron of Tramandaí
- Antônio Correia Seara
- Antônio Joaquim de Sousa
- Antônio José Dias Coelho
- Bento Correia da Câmara
- Camilo Maria Tonellet
- Cândido Xavier de Almeida
- Domingos Alves Branco Muniz Barreto
- Francisco de Arruda Câmara
- Francisco Manuel da Silva e Melo
- Firmino Herculano de Morais Âncora
- Henrique Marques de Oliveira Lisboa
- João Frederico Caldwell
- João Vieira de Carvalho, Marquis of Lajes
- Joaquim Xavier Curado, Count of São João das Duas Barras
- José Arouche de Toledo Rendon
- José Egídio Gordilho de Barbuda, 2nd Viscount of Camamu
- José Fernandes dos Santos Pereira
- José Joaquim Coelho, Baron of Vitória
- José Manuel de Morais
- José Maria Pinto Peixoto
- José da Nóbrega Botelho
- José Maria da Silva Bittencourt
- Lázaro José Gonçalves
- Lourenço Caetano da Silva
- Luís da França Pinto Garcês
- Manuel da Costa Pinto
- Manuel Joaquim Pereira da Silva
- Manuel Jorge Rodrigues, 1st Baron of Taquari
- Manuel Marques de Sousa I
- Manuel Marques de Sousa III, Count of Porto Alegre
- Manuel Martins do Couto Reis
- Manuel de Sousa Pinto de Magalhães, Baron of Turiaçu
- Patrício José Correia da Câmara, 1st Viscount of Pelotas
- Polidoro da Fonseca Quintanilha Jordão, Viscount of Santa Teresa

=== Army marshals ===
- Alexandre Elói Portelli
- Antônio Elzeário de Miranda e Brito
- Bento Manuel Ribeiro
- Carlos Frederico Lecor, Viscount of Laguna
- Felisberto Caldeira Brant Pontes, Marquis of Barbacena
- Francisco Antônio da Silva Bittencourt
- Francisco das Chagas Santos
- Francisco de Paula Maggessi, 1st Baron of Vila Bela
- Francisco José de Sousa Soares de Andrea, Baron of Caçapava
- Francisco de Paula e Vasconcelos
- Francisco Xavier Calmon da Silva Cabral, 3rd Baron of Itapajipe
- Henrique Pedro Carlos de Beaurepaire-Rohan, Viscount of Beaurepaire-Rohan
- João Carlos Pardal
- João Crisóstomo Calado
- João de Deus Menna Barreto, Viscount of São Gabriel
- João Paulo dos Santos Barreto
- Joaquim de Oliveira Álvares
- José Joaquim de Lima e Silva, Viscount of Magé
- José de Oliveira Barbosa, Viscount of Rio Comprido
- José da Vitória Soares de Andrea
- Luís Alves de Lima e Silva, Duke of Caxias
- Gaston, Count of Eu
- Manuel Antônio da Fonseca Costa, Marquis of Gávea
- Manuel da Fonseca de Lima e Silva, Baron of Suruí
- Manuel Luís Osório, Marquis of Erval

== Unconfirmed brigadiers (1822–1831) ==
- Albino Gomes Guerra de Aguiar
- Antônio Lopes de Barros
- Antônio Pinto da Costa
- Antônio de Sousa Sepúlveda
- Daniel Pedro Müller
- Duarte Guilherme Coelho de Morais
- Francisco Antônio de Paula Nogueira da Gama
- Francisco Cordeiro da Silva Torres, Viscount of Jerumirim
- Francisco da Costa de Sousa Macedo, 1st Marquis of Cunha
- Francisco de Lima e Silva
- Francisco Maria Gordilho Veloso de Barbuda, Marquis of Jacarepaguá
- Inácio José Vicente da Fonseca
- Isidoro de Almada e Castro
- Jacinto Desidério Cony
- João Batista Alves Porto
- João da Costa Brito Sanches
- João Francisco Neves
- João Valentim de Faria Sousa Lobato
- Joaquim José Pinto de Morais Leme
- Joaquim Mariano Galvão de Moura e Lacerda
- José Fernando Carneiro Leão, Count of Vila Nova de São José
- José Inácio Borges
- Jacques Antônio Marcos, Count of Beaurepaire
- Luís Carlos da Costa Lacé
- Manuel Ferreira de Araújo Guimarães
- Manuel Pedro de Freitas Guimarães
- Marcelo Joaquim Mendes de Meneses
- Miguel Antônio Flangini
- Miguel Pereira de Araújo Barreto
- Paulo José da Silva Gama, 1st Baron of Bagé
- Salvador José Maciel
- Tomás García de Zúñiga, Baron of Calera

== See also ==
- Imperial Brazilian Army
- Military ranks of the Empire of Brazil

== Bibliography ==
- Silva, Alfredo Pretextato Maciel da (1906). Os Generais do Exército Brasileiro de 1822 a 1889: Traços Biográficos (in Portuguese). Vol. 1. Rio de Janeiro: M. Orosco & C.
- Silva, Alfredo Pretextato Maciel da (1907). Os Generais do Exército Brasileiro de 1822 a 1889: Traços Biográficos (in Portuguese). Vol. 2. Rio de Janeiro: M. Orosco & C.
