= Battle of Curuzú =

- Part of the Humaitá campaign
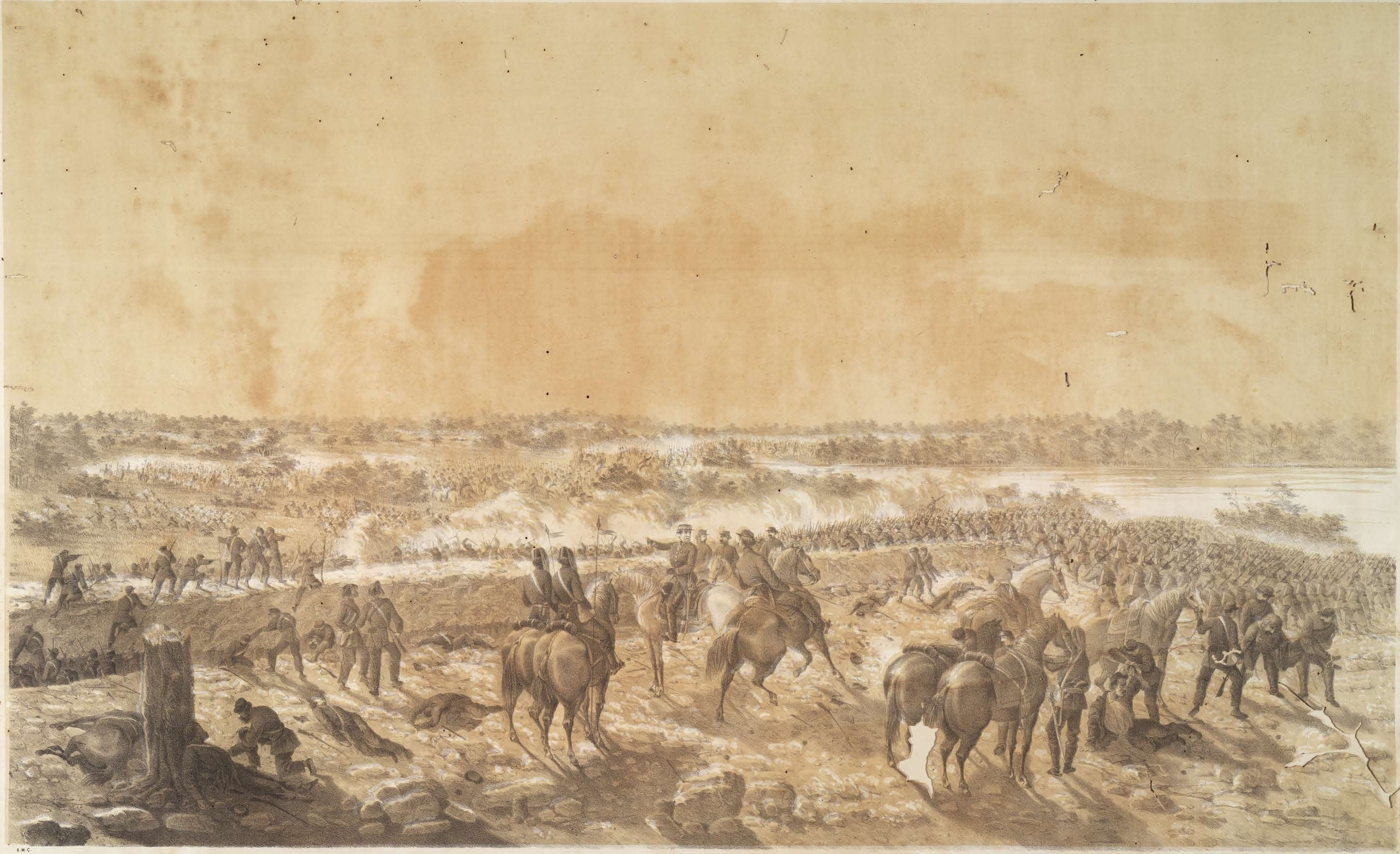
- Taking of the trenches at Curuzú by the 2nd Army Corps commanded by the Baron of Porto Alegre
Date	September 1–3, 1866
Location	Curuzú, Paraguay
Result	Allied victory

Belligerents
Paraguay	Empire of Brazil; Argentina

Commanders and leaders
José E. Díaz; Antonio Giménez	Marques de Sousa; Joaquim M. Lisboa; Bartolomé Mitre

Strength
Over 2,500 men and 13 cannons	4,500 infantry and 3,800 dismounted cavalry 5 Ironclads

Casualties and losses
2,532: 700 killed 1,800 wounded 32 captured	788: 159 killed 629 wounded

The Battle of Curuzú occurred between September 1 and 3, 1866 during the Paraguayan War. After the first Battle of Tuyutí, won by the Allies on 24 May 1866, an Allied council of war decided to use their navy to bombard and capture the Paraguayan battery at Curupayty.

== Battle ==
On September 1, five Brazilian ironclads, Bahia, Barroso, Lima Barros, Rio de Janeiro and Brasil began bombarding the batteries at Curuzú, which continued the next day. That is when the Rio de Janeiro hit two mines and sank immediately along with her commander Américo Brasílio Silvado, and 50 sailors.

Simultaneously, 8,391 men of the Brazilian 2nd Corps, under the command of Manuel Marques de Sousa, then Viscount of Porto Alegre, attacked the Paraguayan batteries at Curuzú, south of the main stronghold of Humaitá on the shores of Paraguay River.

On September 3, the fort, commanded by colonel Giménez, was stormed. The defenders relied on the advantage of the wetlands and bushes around the fort. The fort was conquered after a heavy bombardment, and the Paraguayan army was pursued until the vicinity of Curupayty.

The Brazilian ironclad Rio de Janeiro had a hole blown in her bottom by a contact mine, and sank almost immediately – the greater part of her crew, together with her captain, being drowned. This was the only ironclad sunk during the war.

== Aftermath ==
President Francisco Solano López decimated the 10th Infantry Battalion on 10 September 1866, killing 63 men.

== Gallery ==
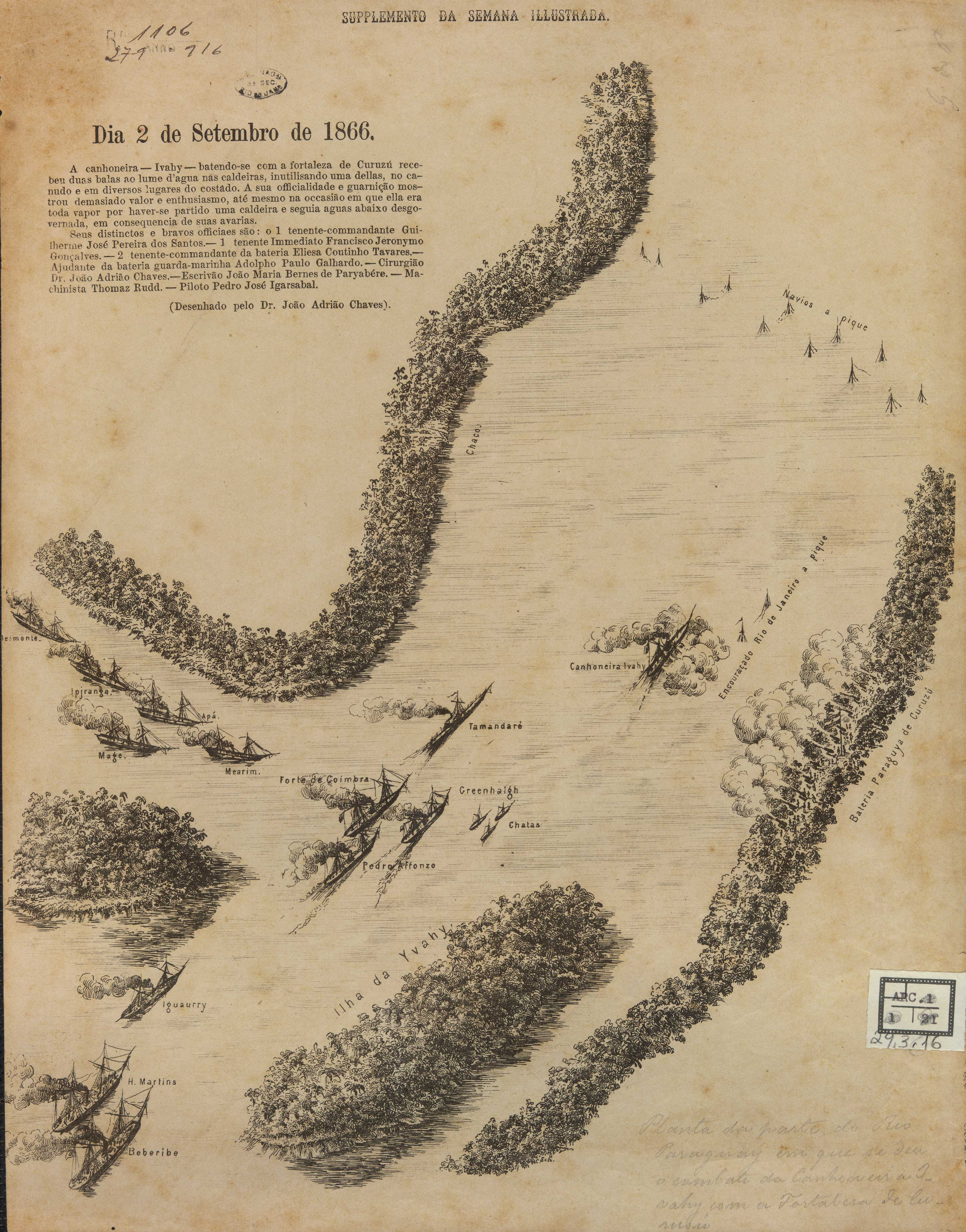
Map of the part of the Paraguay River where took place the fight of the gunboat Ivaí with the Fortress of Curuzú

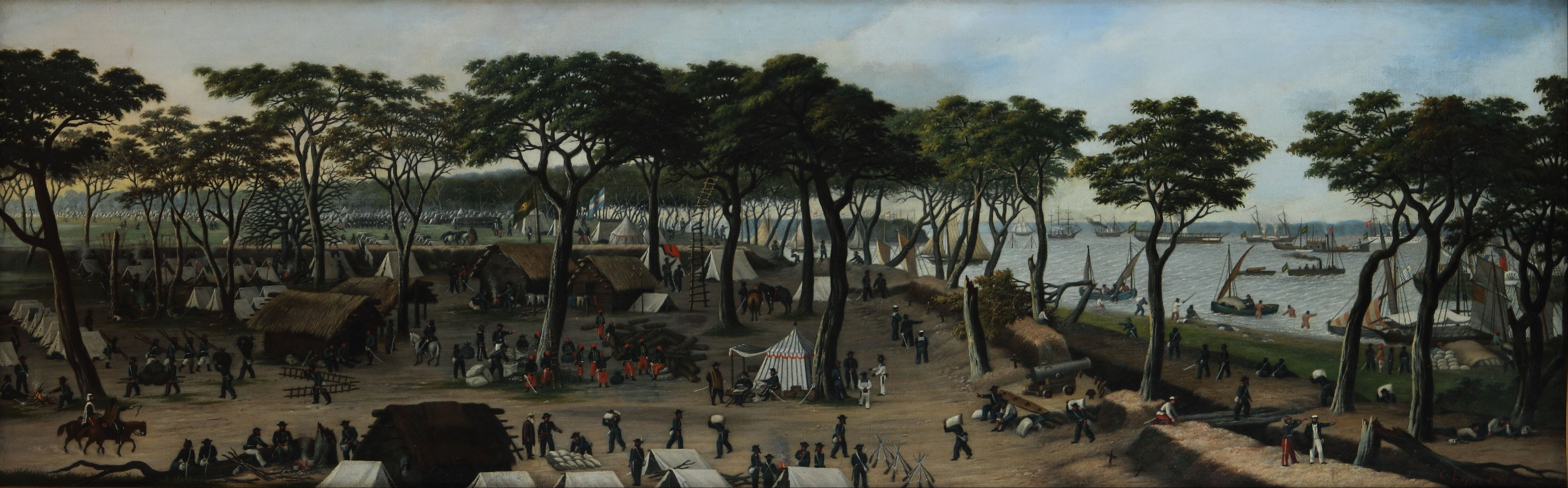
Interior view of Curuzú.

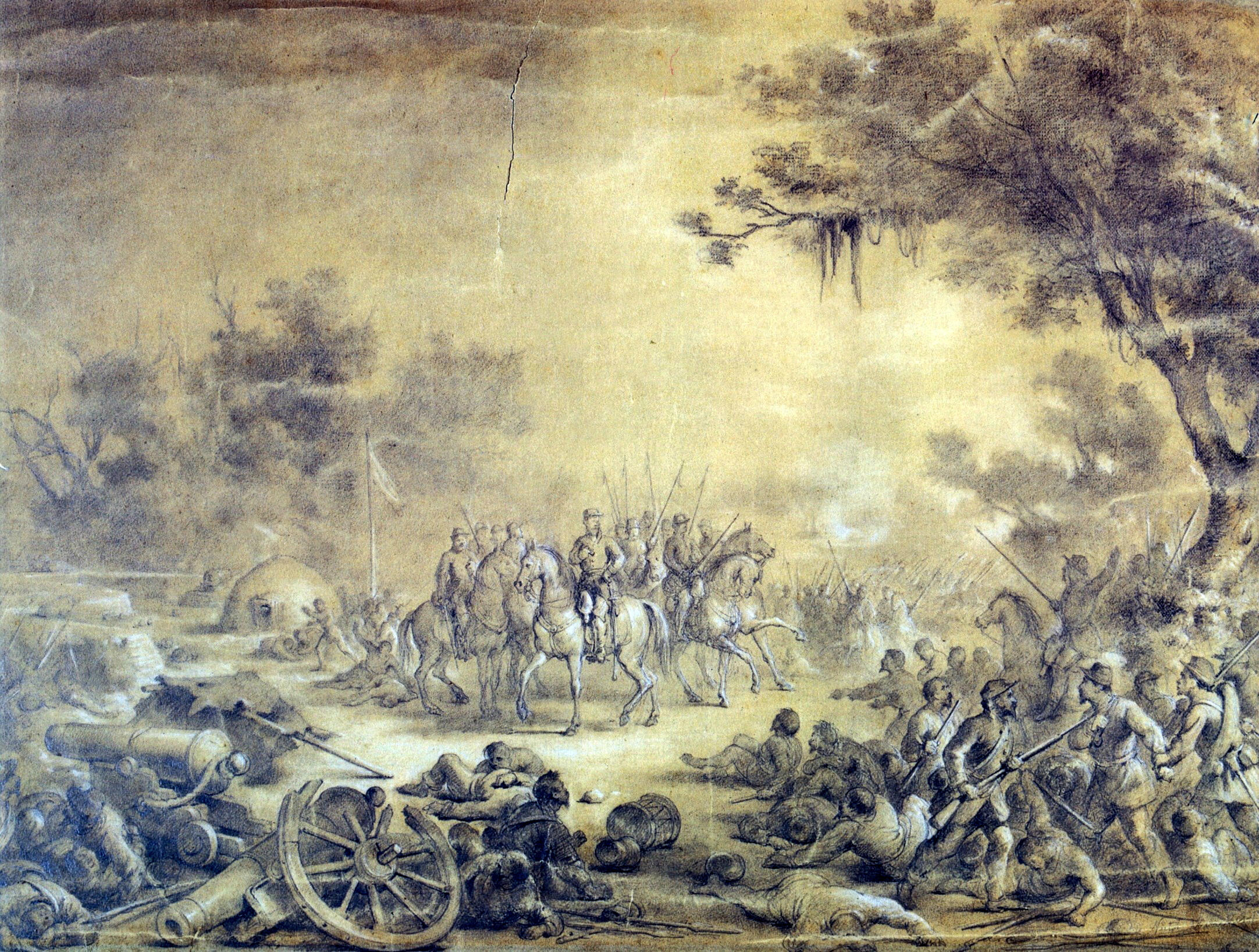
The Viscount of Porto Alegre leads the Brazilian forces in the Battle of Curuzú, 1866, by Victor Meirelles.

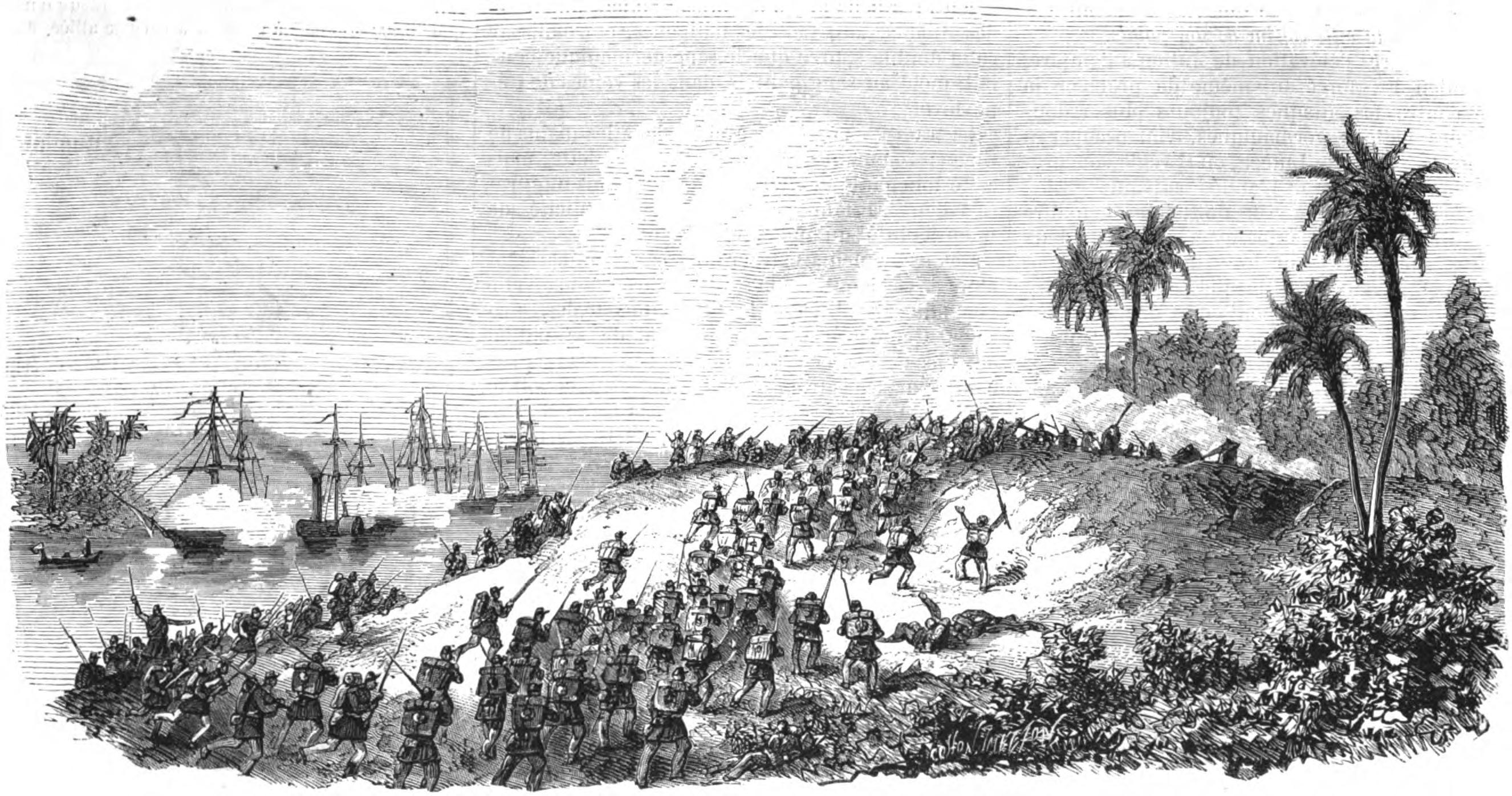
Taking the battery of Curuzú (3 September) by the Brazilian 2nd Army Corps, under the command of lientenant-general Viscount of Porto Alegre (according to a sketch of Mr. Paranhos).

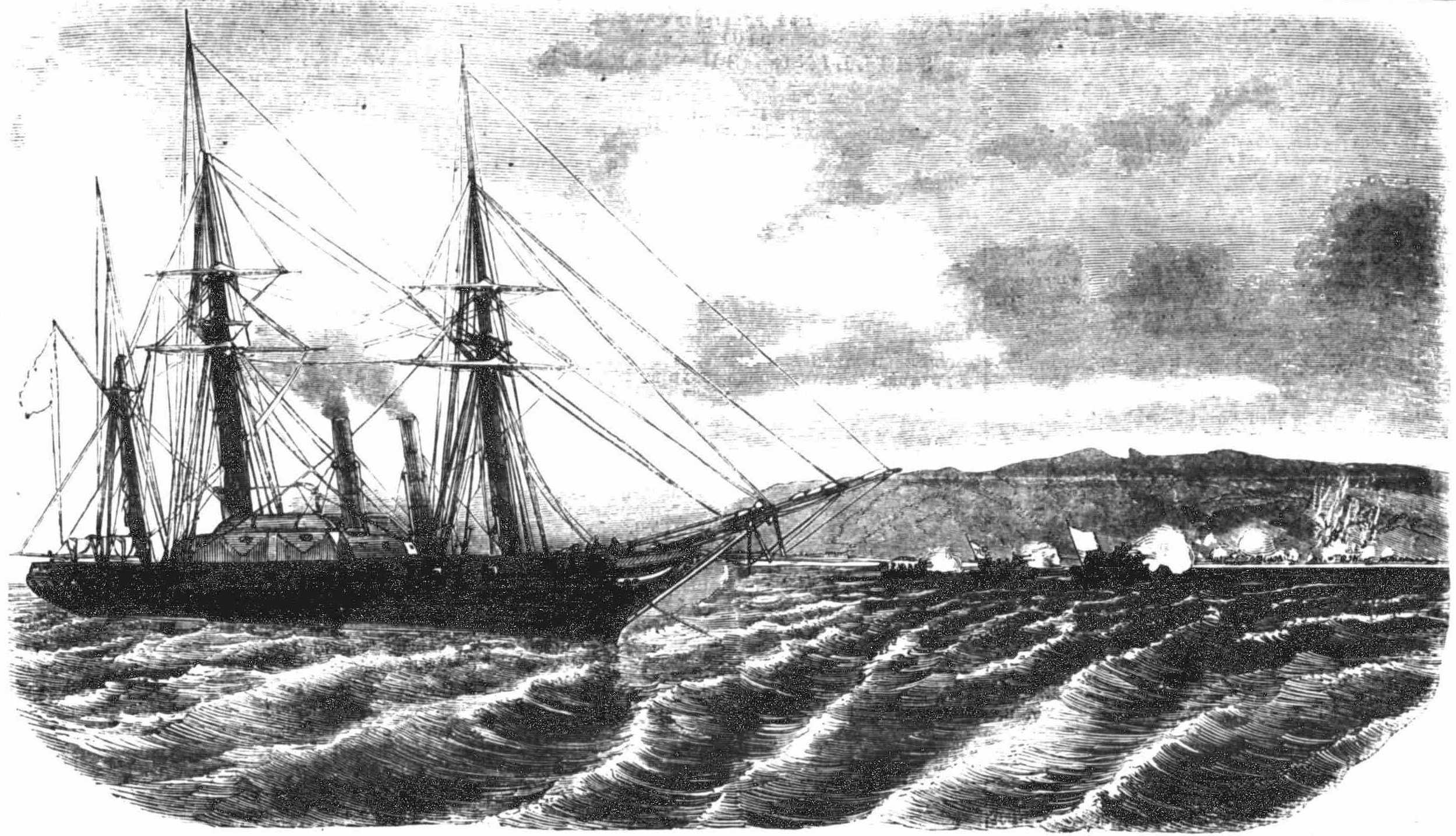
Attack on Paraguayan Forts.

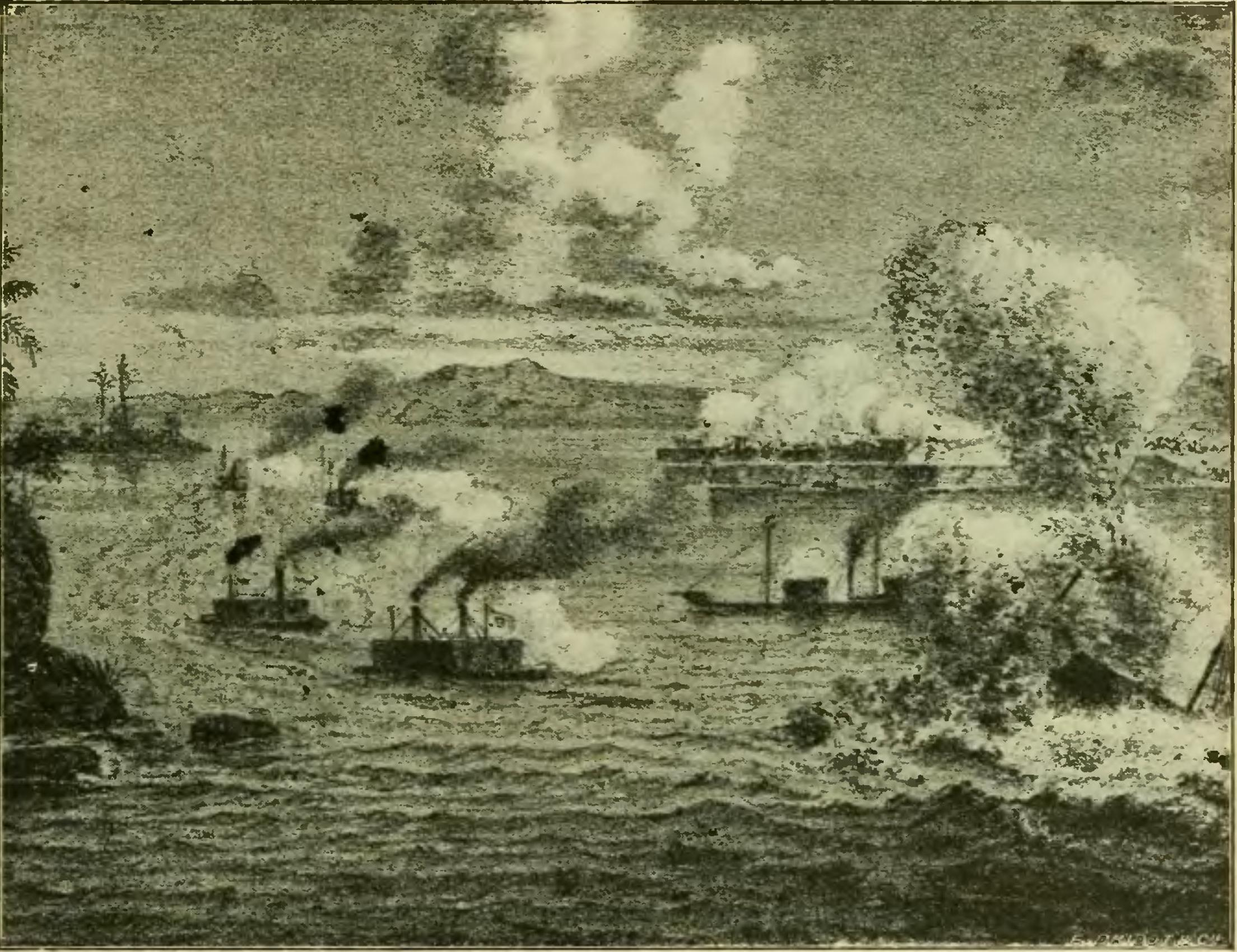
Bombardment of Curuzú

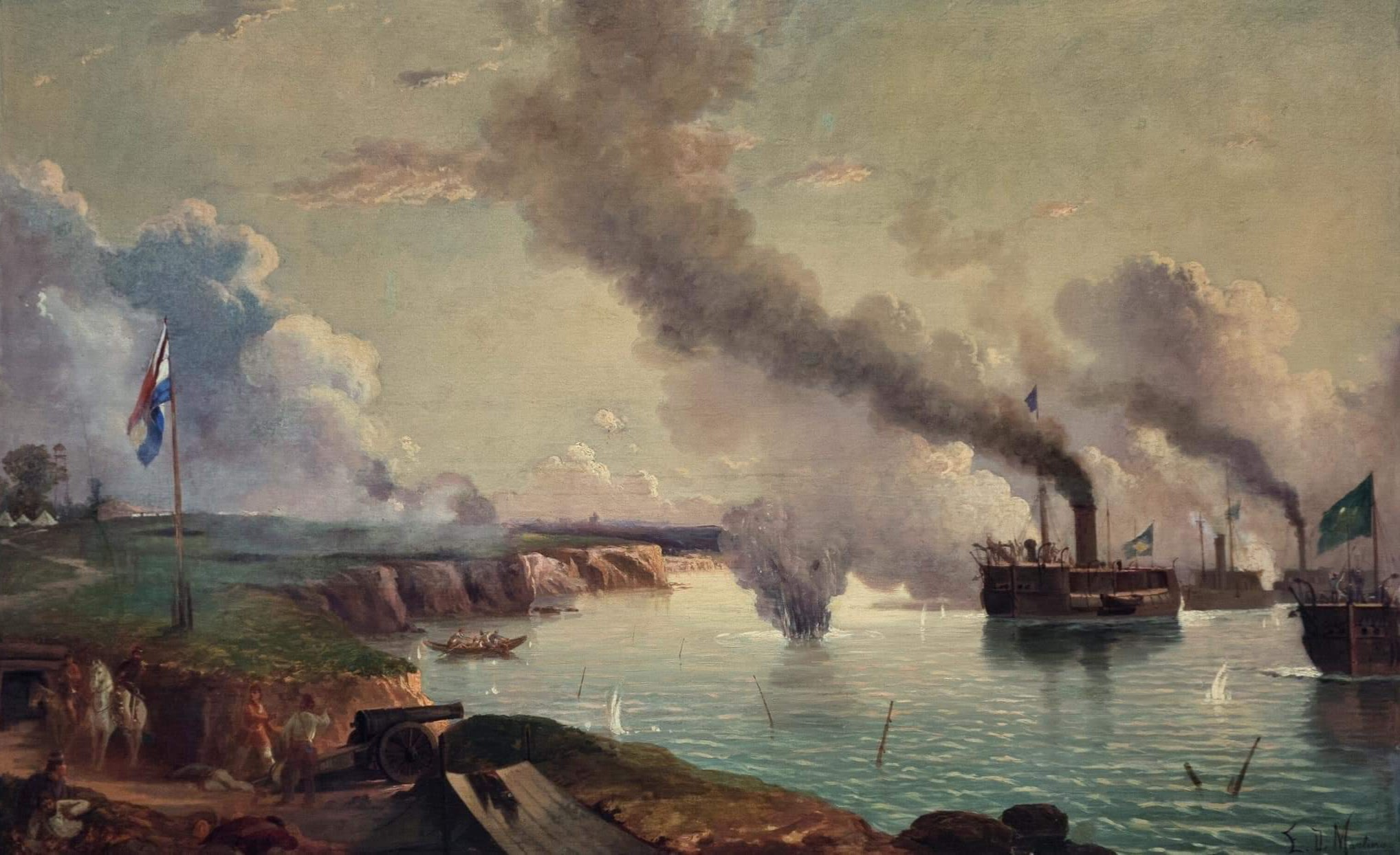
Bombardment of Curuzú (Edoardo De Martino).

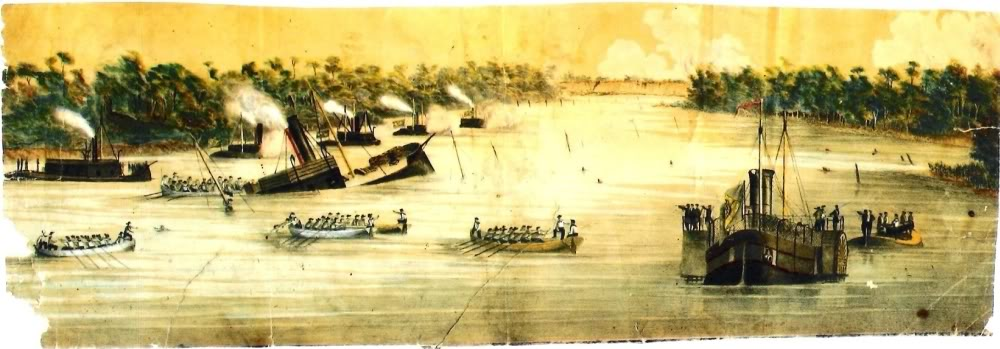
Rio de Janeiro sunk by a contact mine, painted by Adolfo Methfessel.

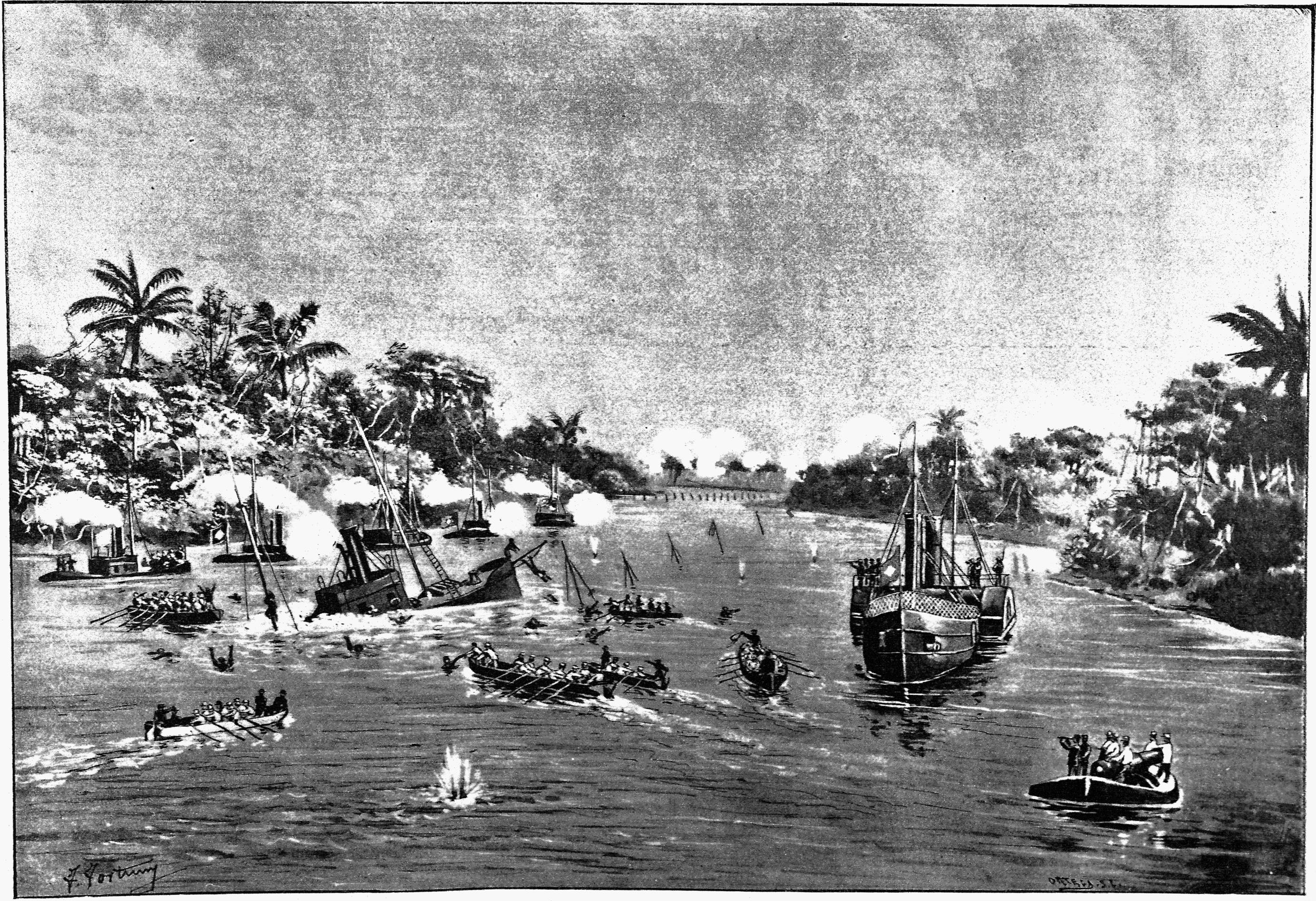
Rio de Janeiro sunk by a contact mine in front of Curuzú.

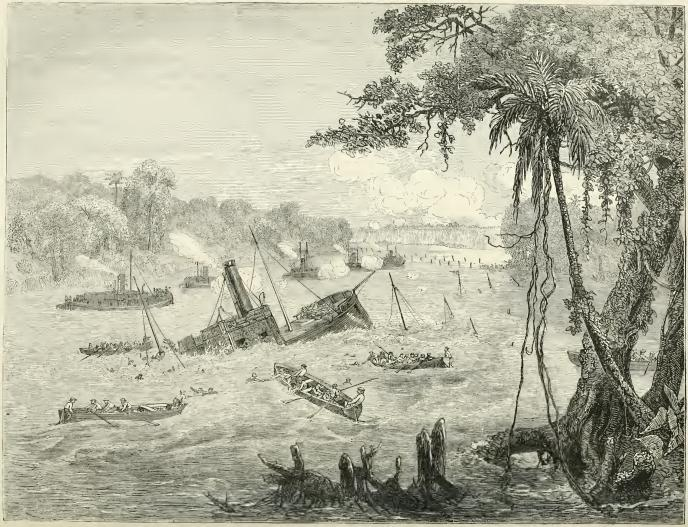
Naval Warfare in Paraguay: Destruction of the ironclad Rio de Janeiro by a mine.

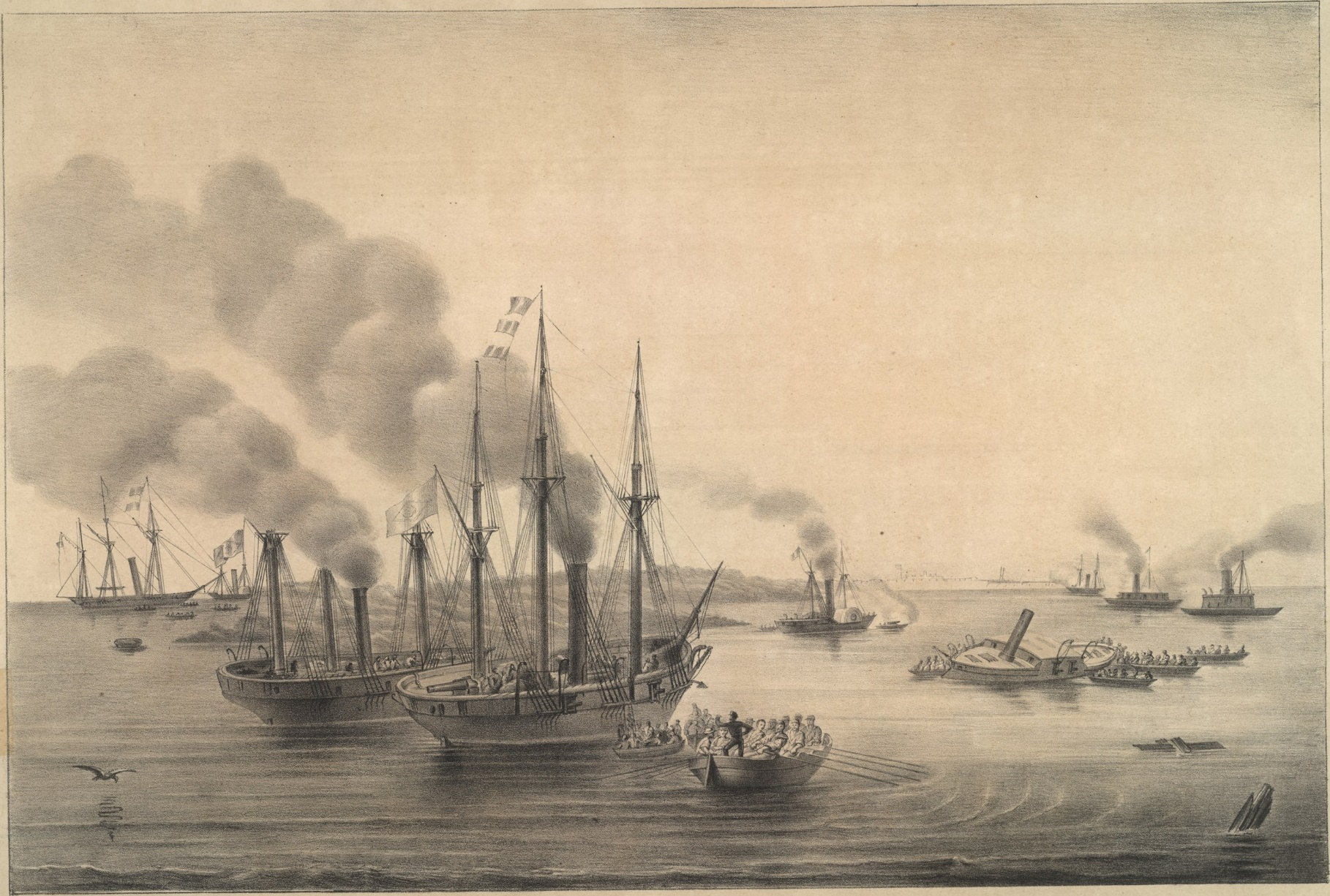
Passage of Curuzú.

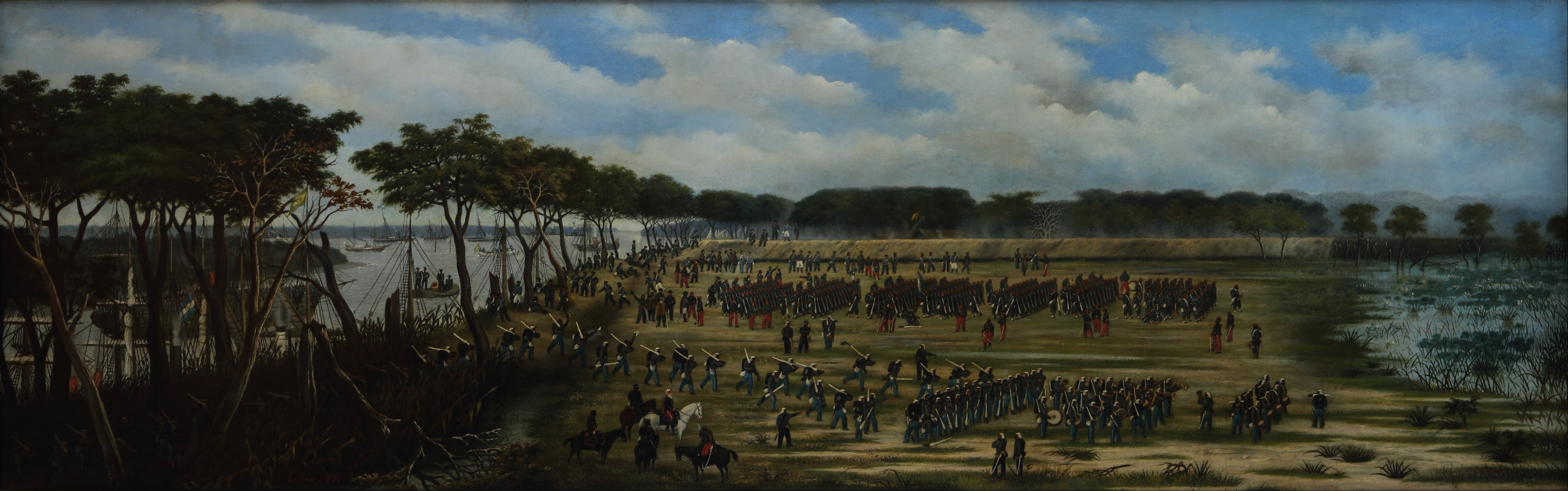
Brazilian (all blue uniform) and Argentine (blue and red uniform) troops landing in Curuzú
