= Manuel Marques de Sousa, Count of Porto Alegre =

Brazilian statesman and military leader (1804–1875)

The Count of Porto Alegre
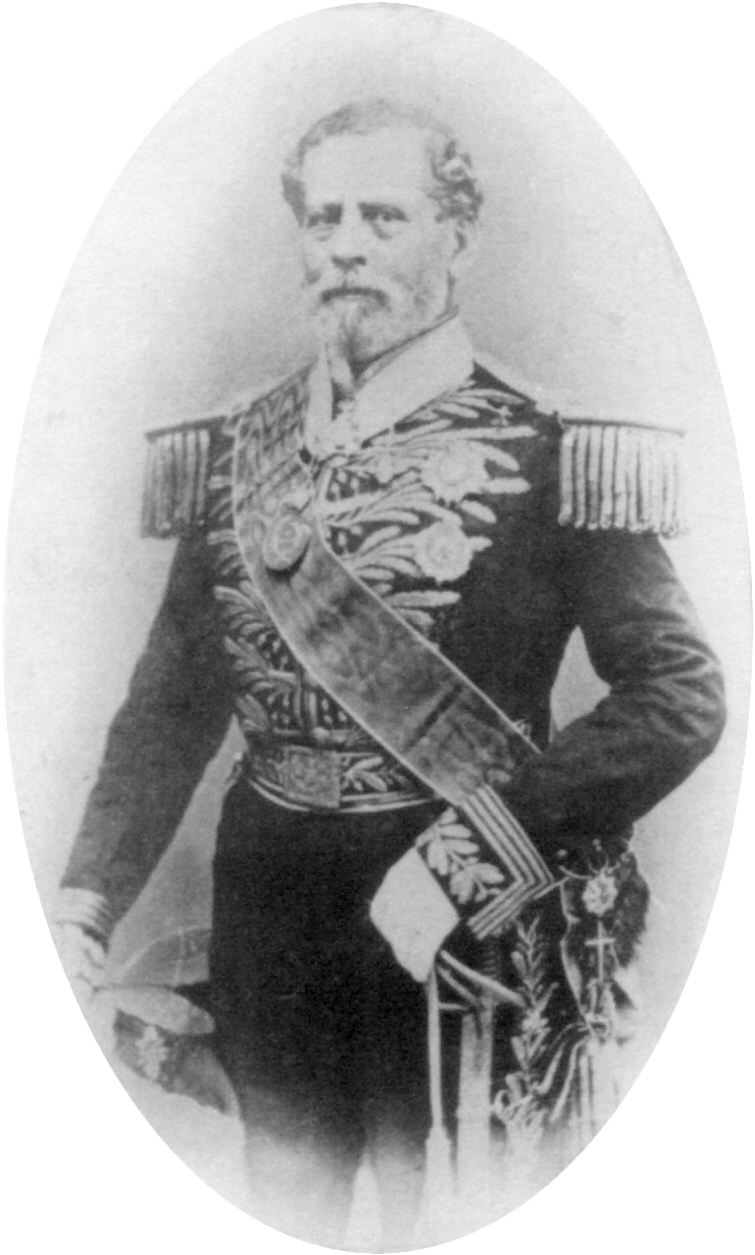
- Porto Alegre c. 1865
- Born: 13 June 1804; Rio Grande, State of Brazil, Portuguese Empire
- Died: 18 July 1875 (aged 71); Rio de Janeiro, Neutral Municipality, Empire of Brazil
- Relatives: Manuel Marques de Sousa II (father)
- Military career
- Allegiance: Empire of Brazil
- Branch: Imperial Brazilian Army
- Service years: 1817–1856; 1865–1868
- Rank: Lieutenant general
- Nickname: The Gloved Centaur
- Conflicts: Portuguese conquest of the Banda Oriental; Brazilian War of Independence; Cisplatine War; Ragamuffin War; Platine War; Paraguayan War
- Other work: Minister of War
- Coat of Arms of the Count of Porto Alegre

Manuel Marques de Sousa, Count of Porto Alegre (13 June 1804 – 18 July 1875), nicknamed "the Gloved Centaur", (Note: The Count of Porto Alegre has been called "the Gloved Centaur" by historians because he was a well-mannered and impeccably dressed cavalryman.(Fonttes 1994, p. 124)(Correia Neto 2004, p. 295)) was a Brazilian army officer, politician and abolitionist. Born into a wealthy family of military background, Manuel Marques de Sousa joined the Portuguese Army in Brazil in 1817 when he was a child. His military initiation occurred in the conquest of the Banda Oriental (Eastern Bank), which was annexed and became the southernmost Brazilian province of Cisplatina in 1821. For most of the 1820s, he was embroiled in the Brazilian effort to keep Cisplatina as part of its territory: first during the struggle for Brazilian independence and then in the Cisplatine War. It would ultimately prove a futile attempt, as Cisplatina successfully separated from Brazil to become the independent nation of Uruguay in 1828.

A few years later, in 1835 his native province of Rio Grande do Sul was engulfed in a secessionist rebellion, the Ragamuffin War. The conflict lasted for almost ten years, and the Count was leading military engagements for most of that time. He played a decisive role in saving the provincial capital from the Ragamuffin rebels, allowing forces loyal to the legitimate government to secure a key foothold. In 1852, he led a Brazilian division during the Platine War in an invasion of the Argentine Confederation that overthrew its dictator. He was awarded a noble title, eventually raised from baron to viscount and finally to count.

In the postwar years, Porto Alegre turned his attention to politics, retiring from his military career as a lieutenant general, the second-highest rank in the Imperial Army. He was an affiliate of the Liberal Party at the national level and was elected to the legislature of Rio Grande do Sul. He also founded a provincial party, the Progressive-Liberal Party—a coalition of Liberals like him and some members of the Conservative Party. Porto Alegre later entered the lower house of the Brazilian parliament and was briefly Minister of War. When the Paraguayan War erupted in 1864, he returned to active duty. One of the main Brazilian commanders during the conflict, his participation was marked by important battlefield victories, as well as constant quarrels with his Argentine and Uruguayan allies.

Upon his return from the war, Porto Alegre resumed his political career. He became an active advocate for the abolition of slavery and a patron in the fields of literature and science. His death came on 18 July 1875 while again serving in Parliament. He was highly esteemed until the downfall of the monarchy in 1889. Regarded as too closely associated with the fallen regime, Porto Alegre slipped into obscurity. His reputation was eventually rehabilitated to a certain degree by historians, some of whom consider him to be among Brazil's greatest military figures.

== Early years ==
=== Birth and background ===
Manuel Marques de Sousa was born on 13 June 1804 (sometimes erroneously given as 1805) in Rio Grande. The town was located in Rio Grande do Sul, a southern captaincy (later province) of Brazil, then part of the Portuguese Colonial Empire. His parents were Manuel Marques de Sousa and Senhorinha Inácia da Silveira. He had four younger siblings: two sisters and two brothers. An archetypal leading family of Rio Grande do Sul, Marques de Sousa's Portuguese-descended family was wealthy and influential, owning ranches and huge cattle herds. His father and his paternal grandfather, both also named Manuel Marques de Sousa, were seasoned soldiers who took part in the colonial wars. His grandfather, the elder Marques de Sousa, was the wealthiest person in Rio Grande do Sul.

Thinly populated, far from the colonial capital of Rio de Janeiro (which exercised little actual control), Rio Grande do Sul was often the target of invasions from its neighboring Hispanic-American colony, the United Provinces of the Río de la Plata (later Argentina). Because the captaincy had to be self-sufficient, the inhabitants of Rio Grande do Sul led lives as merchants, farmers or ranchers, while often also serving as soldiers or militiamen. Owners of large landholdings such as Marques de Sousa's father and grandfather provided food, equipment and protection for themselves and families living in areas under their control. Their private defense forces consisted primarily of laborers who were drafted as soldiers. Marques de Sousa grew up in that hostile environment, and from a very young age he listened to war stories recounting the exploits of his relatives against Hispanic-American invaders.

=== Conquest of the Banda Oriental ===
In 1808, the Portuguese Royal Family arrived in Brazil, settling in Rio de Janeiro. The Hispanic-American colonies became easy prey, as they were engulfed in turmoil and beset by wars of independence against Spain. In 1811 Prince Regent Dom João (later King Dom João VI) ordered the invasion of the Banda Oriental (Eastern Bank), which bordered Rio Grande do Sul. João's attempt at conquering the entire region met with failure. He launched another invasion a few years later, in 1816, who counted among their ranks Marques de Sousa's father and paternal grandfather. In 1817, around age 13, he asked his grandfather to allow him to fight in the war. The elder Marques de Sousa agreed, and the youngster learned guerrilla hit-and-run tactics on horseback near the border town of Jaguarão.

Months later, on 20 January 1818, Marques de Sousa was enlisted into the army as a cadet in the 1st Regiment of Light Cavalry in the Division of Royal Volunteers. The regiment had been deployed to Montevideo, the largest town in the Banda Oriental. He fought in the Battle of Pando on 30 March and in the Battle of Manga near Montevideo on 1 April. Successful in both battles, on 24 June he was promoted to alferes (equivalent to a modern-day second lieutenant) and named adjutant to the commander-in-chief, Lieutenant General Carlos Frederico Lecor (then Baron and later Viscount of Laguna).

Years later as an elderly man near the end of his life, Marques de Sousa would fondly recall his advancement: "Never in my life had I judged myself so great, nor experienced such ineffable rejoicing ... as in the day I placed my fists into the cuffs of alferes. I walked through all the streets of the city, looking at myself, conceited, believing that everyone looking with admiration envied my luck, that all enamored ladies vied for my hand." For the remainder of the conflict he was stationed in the defense of Montevideo. The conquest of the Banda Oriental was ended in July 1821, when Portugal declared it a province of Brazil with the name of Cisplatina.

=== Wars for Cisplatina ===
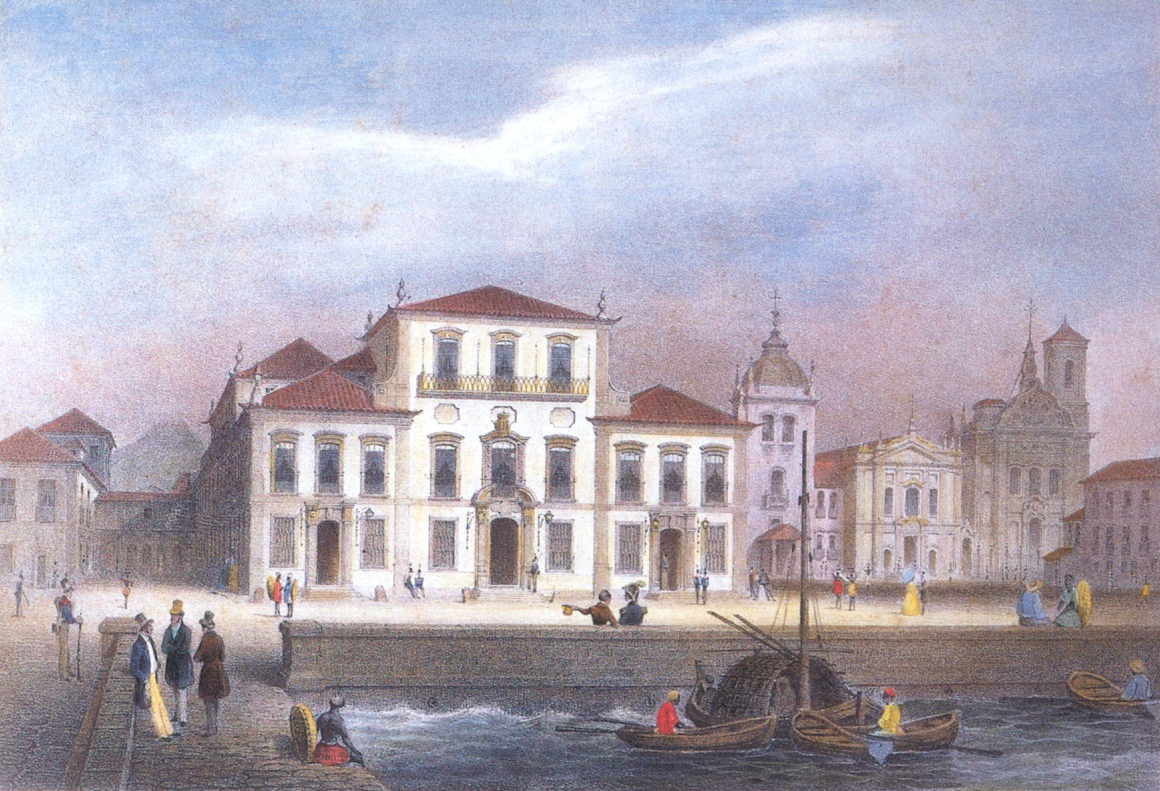
Rio de Janeiro, capital of the Empire of Brazil, with the City Palace at the center

News arrived in Montevideo in late 1822 that Prince Dom Pedro, son and heir of King João VI, had declared the independence of Brazil on 7 September and had been acclaimed emperor as Dom Pedro I on 12 October. Marques de Sousa was dispatched to Rio de Janeiro by the Baron of Laguna to pledge loyalty to the Emperor on behalf of the army in the south. The young alferes was an apt choice for the task; he was well connected in the imperial capital (his uncle, married to a paternal aunt, was Minister of War), cultured, and well educated. Marques de Sousa was a handsome man of average height with dark, curly hair and brown eyes. Fastidious about his appearance, he always took care to dress well, even during battles, and contemporaries made note of his trimmed and clean nails. He was also merry and gallant, with a "pleasant and well-tuned voice in conversation, ample and resounding in command".

Brazilian independence did not meet with unanimous approval in the south. Part of the army, led by Dom Álvaro de Macedo (later Count of Ilha da Madeira), entrenched itself in Montevideo and remained loyal to Portugal. The town was besieged by forces under Laguna. Following his return from the imperial capital, Marques de Sousa served under his father's command, taking part in the siege and later fighting in the successful Battle of Las Piedras on 18 May 1823. In early 1824, Macedo and his men surrendered. The end of the Brazilian War of Independence came at a cost for Marques de Sousa. His father was mysteriously murdered with poison in Montevideo on 21 November 1824, leaving him the head of his family at age 20, as his paternal grandfather had died (of old age) on 22 April 1822. He was promoted to lieutenant (modern-day first lieutenant) on 1 December 1824 for his acts of bravery during the war.

A few months after his promotion, in April 1825, secessionists in Cisplatina rebelled. The United Provinces of the Río de la Plata attempted to annex the province, and in retaliation Brazil declared war, triggering the Cisplatine War. Although Marques de Sousa was living in Rio de Janeiro and enrolled in the Military Academy, he was ordered to return to Montevideo. He was soon named adjutant to Brigadier Sebastião Barreto Pereira Pinto, commander of the 1st Division, which was defending Rio Grande do Sul. Marques de Sousa fought in the unsuccessful Battle of Ituzaingó (known to Brazilians as the Battle of the Passo do Rosário) on 20 February 1827. For his acts of bravery during the ill-fated battle, he was promoted on 20 March to captain, and, on 16 August, he was assigned as adjutant to the now Viscount of Laguna, commander-in-chief of Brazilian land forces in the conflict. Marques de Sousa subsequently fought in the Battle of Camaquã on 28 April and participated in other, smaller skirmishes.

== Ragamuffin rebellion ==
=== Secessionist threat ===
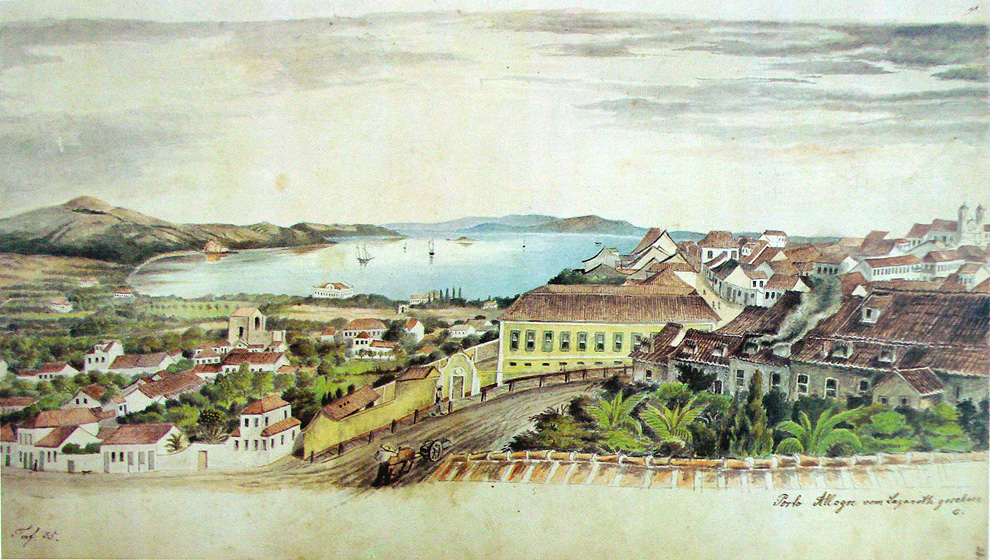
Porto Alegre, capital of Rio Grande do Sul province, seven years after the end of the Ragamuffin War

By 1828, Brazil could no longer sustain the war effort in the south and in April relinquished Cisplatina, which became the independent nation of Uruguay. Marques de Sousa was sent to Montevideo to serve under field marshal (present-day divisional general) Manuel Jorge Rodrigues, who commanded a Brazilian force temporarily stationed in the new country. On 29 March 1829, Marques de Sousa was made brevet (acting) major, and, on 28 August 1830, he was placed in command of the 6th company of 4th Regiment of Light Cavalry. Stationed in Rio Grande do Sul, the unit had previously been commanded by his father and his paternal grandfather.

The peaceful lull following the Cisplatine conflict did not last long. On 20 September 1835, a civil war erupted in Rio Grande do Sul. The revolt, known as the Ragamuffin War, began after the provincial president (governor) was removed from office in a coup d'état. Despite the nickname, the Ragamuffin rebels were landlords, like Marques de Sousa, who after losing elections tried to take power by force. Marques de Sousa was among the army officers in the province who remained loyal to the deposed president. He fought in the Battle of Arroio Grande on 14 October 1835, in which rebel troops were defeated. But the forces loyal to the legitimate government were heavily outnumbered. Marques de Sousa and the deposed president departed for Rio de Janeiro to request aid, but the central government was unable to render much assistance, as rebellions and riots had broken out all over the country. With the infantry's 1st Battalion of Caçadores (Sharpshooters) placed under his command, Marques de Sousa embarked on 8 March 1836 for Pelotas, in southeastern Rio Grande do Sul, after being named its military commander.

Pelotas was besieged and conquered by the Ragamuffins on 7 April 1836. Marques de Sousa was taken prisoner and removed to Porto Alegre, capital of Rio Grande do Sul, which had been under rebel control since the beginning of the conflict. He was held in a presiganga (prison ship). During his imprisonment, with the aid of the people of Porto Alegre, he managed to convince some of the rebel soldiers to switch sides, taking control of the entire town during the early hours of 15 June and arresting the remaining Ragamuffins. He repulsed rebel land and sea assaults against Porto Alegre on 18 June 30 June 15 and 20 July; after that, the town remained in the hands of the legitimate government until the end of the conflict. The central government in Rio de Janeiro promoted Marques de Sousa to permanent major on 18 February 1837 in recognition of his vital role. The balance of power tipped against the Ragamuffins only a few months after the declaration of Rio Grande do Sul's independence on 11 September 1836. The Ragamuffins, although emboldened by their initial successes, never managed to gain control of the entire province.

=== Province pacification ===
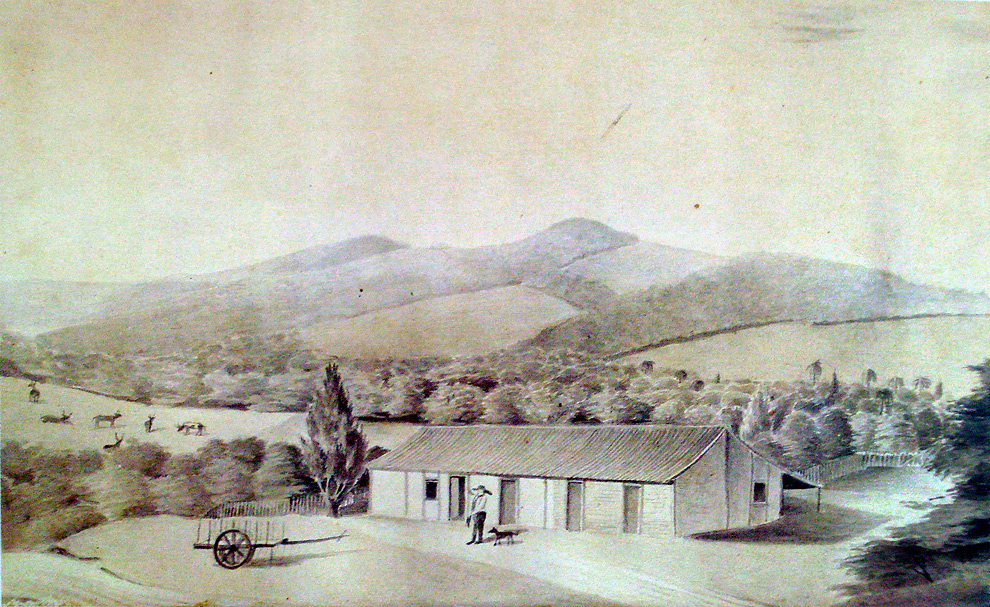
The countryside of the province of Rio Grande do Sul

The long, strenuous walk from Pelotas to Porto Alegre and the hardships endured in the presiganga ruined Marques de Sousa's health, and he was afflicted with articular rheumatism for the rest of his life. With Porto Alegre momentarily safe, the first of its three sieges having ended, he was granted a leave of absence to recover. In the middle of 1837, he traveled to Europe for medical treatment. After a year away, and still feeling ill, Marques de Sousa secluded himself in Porto Alegre. He was brevetted lieutenant colonel on 20 August 1838. He only returned to active duty in early 1840 after he was made permanent lieutenant colonel on 2 December 1839 and given the command of the 2nd Regiment of Light Cavalry. However, the war against the Ragamuffins was still being waged, and Marques de Sousa met and defeated a rebel force in the Battle of the Várzea do Varejão on 16 September 1841. A new promotion came on 27 March 1842, when he was given the rank of colonel.

The course of the conflict took a radical turn when the central government charged Luís Alves de Lima e Silva (then Count and later Duke of Caxias) with putting an end to the rebellion in late 1842. Marques de Sousa probably met him during Caxias' short trip to Rio Grande do Sul in 1839 as part of the Minister of War's entourage. They subsequently maintained a friendly correspondence. Marques de Sousa was removed from his position over the 2nd Regiment of Light Cavalry and instead was given command of the 7th Brigade, which formed part of the 1st Division. The brigade consisted of his former 2nd Regiment of Light Cavalry and a National Guard cavalry corps.

Unlike his predecessors, who were notable for their inertia, Caxias went on the offensive from the start. In July 1843, Marques de Sousa attacked the rebel capital, Piratini, which had been all but abandoned by the Ragamuffins. He marched from there to Pelotas and recaptured the town he had lost in 1836. On 2 December, he fought and won a small skirmish with rebels near the imperial army's main encampment. He remained in the village of São Gabriel for most of 1844, guarding it undisturbed. The Ragamuffins were by this time on the run, and they sued for peace. Caxias chose Marques de Sousa to take a Ragamuffin representative to discuss a peace accord with the central government; they arrived in Rio de Janeiro on 12 December. The negotiations were successful, and the war came to an end on 1 March 1845.

== War and politics ==
=== Platine War ===
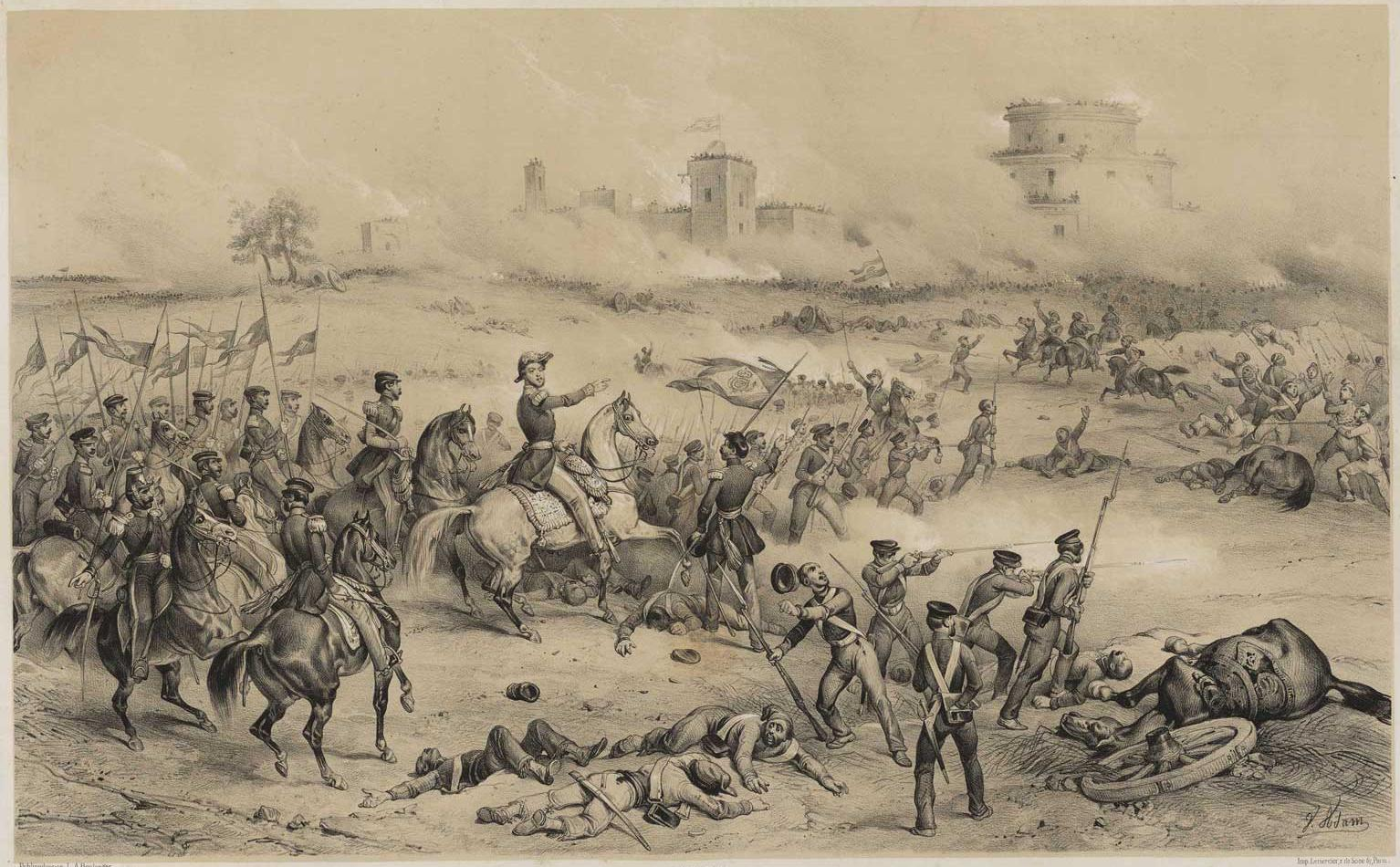
Marques de Sousa (on horseback pointing his finger) leading the Brazilian 1st division during the Battle of Caseros

The Provincial Assembly of Rio Grande do Sul was closed in 1837, and no elections were held because of the Ragamuffin rebellion. In 1845, Marques de Sousa ran and was elected as provincial deputy in the legislature that met in 1846, though he had no party affiliation. He married Maria Balbina Álvares da Gama, daughter of José Gama Lobo de Eça (later Baron of Saicã), on 28 November 1846. The couple's only child, Maria Manuela da Gama Marques, was born less than a year and a half later. Marques de Sousa was made brevet brigadier on 14 March 1847, and the 2nd Cavalry Brigade was placed under his command (until April 1848). He was later confirmed in the rank of brigadier on 14 August 1850. On 11 June 1851, his wife died in childbirth (aged 29), leaving him with a three-year-old daughter.

Barely a month later on 18 August 1851, Juan Manuel de Rosas, dictator of the Argentine Confederation, declared war on Brazil, beginning the Platine War. Marques de Sousa had been warned by Caxias as early as 27 July 1844 of the possibility of an armed conflict between Brazil and its Platine neighbor. The government in Rio de Janeiro had prepared against the threat and formed an anti-Rosas alliance consisting of Brazil, Uruguay and dissident Argentine provinces. Caxias, who had been appointed commander-in-chief of Brazilian land forces, placed Marques de Sousa at the head of the 2nd Brigade, part of the 2nd Division. The Brazilian army crossed into Uruguay in September 1851. On 17 November, while the army was camped in the village of Santa Lucía near the Uruguayan capital, Marques de Sousa was promoted to a higher command, the 1st division. The choice was controversial, as there were two more senior and experienced officers next in line who were bypassed owing to their foreign birth.

The allies decided to divide their forces into two armies: a multinational force that included the 1st Division and a second army composed entirely of Brazilians under Caxias. The 1st Division led by Marques de Sousa, along with Uruguayan and Argentine rebel troops, invaded Argentina. He found the long march to Buenos Aires, the Argentine capital, highly uncomfortable. He had spent his life up to that point fighting Hispanic-Americans, and he was now marching as their ally, surrounded by them. He did not trust them, and they trusted neither him nor his men. The only person among the allies with whom he shared his thoughts, and guardedly at that, was Domingo Faustino Sarmiento (later president of Argentina): "We [Brazilians] form in here a separate group; we do not talk to anyone; no one approaches us and we could say that we walk among enemies." On 3 February 1852, in the Battle of Caseros, they faced Rosas and his army. The allies were victorious, Rosas fled to the United Kingdom, and Marques de Sousa acquired his carriage as a war trophy.

=== Party leader ===
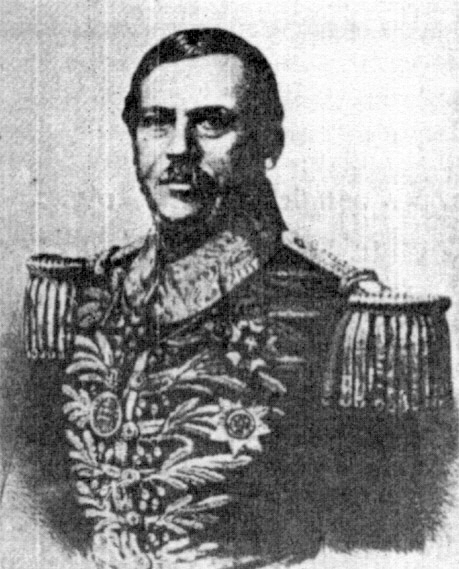
Porto Alegre at age 57, 1861

On 3 March 1852, Marques de Sousa was raised to the rank of field marshal, and Emperor Dom Pedro II conferred on him the noble title of Barão de Porto Alegre (Baron of Porto Alegre). It was a reward for his victory at Caseros, but also a nod to his role in saving the capital of Rio Grande do Sul during 1836. His exploits achieved great renown in Brazil, where he was referred to as the "Vanquisher of the Platine Tiger [Rosas]". He replaced Caxias as head of the army that had fought in the war on 26 June, after its return to Brazil. Soon after, on 24 September, the Baron of Porto Alegre was removed from that post and made comandante das armas (military commander) of Rio Grande do Sul, a position he held until he requested to be relieved on 5 March 1853.

As one of the largest landowners in Rio Grande do Sul, and now a war hero, Porto Alegre believed that he could win a senatorial seat in 1852, but his candidacy was a failure. From a list containing the names of the candidates who had received the most votes, Pedro II chose one of Porto Alegre's rivals as senator. During his campaign, Porto Alegre founded and became head of the "Progressive-Liberal Party", a provincial coalition drawn from members of both national political parties: the Liberal Party and the Party of Order (then increasingly known as the Conservative Party). His personal life greatly improved after he married Bernardina Soares de Paiva, who was thirty-three years his junior, on 11 June 1855. Their marriage was happy and produced two daughters, Maria Bernardina in 1860 and Clara in 1873. Between the death of his first wife and his second marriage, he had a daughter named Maria Manuela Marques, whom he legitimized. Porto Alegre petitioned for, and was granted, a military retirement on 7 July 1856 and was raised to lieutenant general, the second highest rank in the imperial army.

The opportunity to graduate from provincial to national politics came soon after. The Conservative prime minister Honório Hermeto Carneiro Leão, Marquis of Paraná, faced overwhelming opposition from his own party in parliament. Paraná knew that the party's principles were seen as irrelevant and ignored at local and provincial levels. A cabinet could use patronage alone to gain backing from local bosses for its national candidates, including in the province of Rio Grande do Sul. Porto Alegre was a Liberal allied to Conservatives in his province. He pledged support to Paraná and in 1857 was elected general deputy (member of the Chamber of Deputies, the national legislature's lower house). He was reelected in 1860.

On 19 February 1860, he founded and became the first and only president of the Historic and Geographic Institute of the Province of São Pedro (as Rio Grande do Sul was also known). The institute was short-lived, lasting from 1860 until 1864. In 1862, Porto Alegre was among the Liberals who, along with dissident Conservatives, founded the Liga Progressista (Progressive League), which replaced the Liberal Party. He became Minister of War on 24 May as a member of the first Progressive cabinet, headed by Zacarias de Góis e Vasconcelos. However, the cabinet fell after a vote of no confidence six days later. When the Chamber of Deputies was dissolved in 1863 and new elections were called, he was elected and served until 1866.

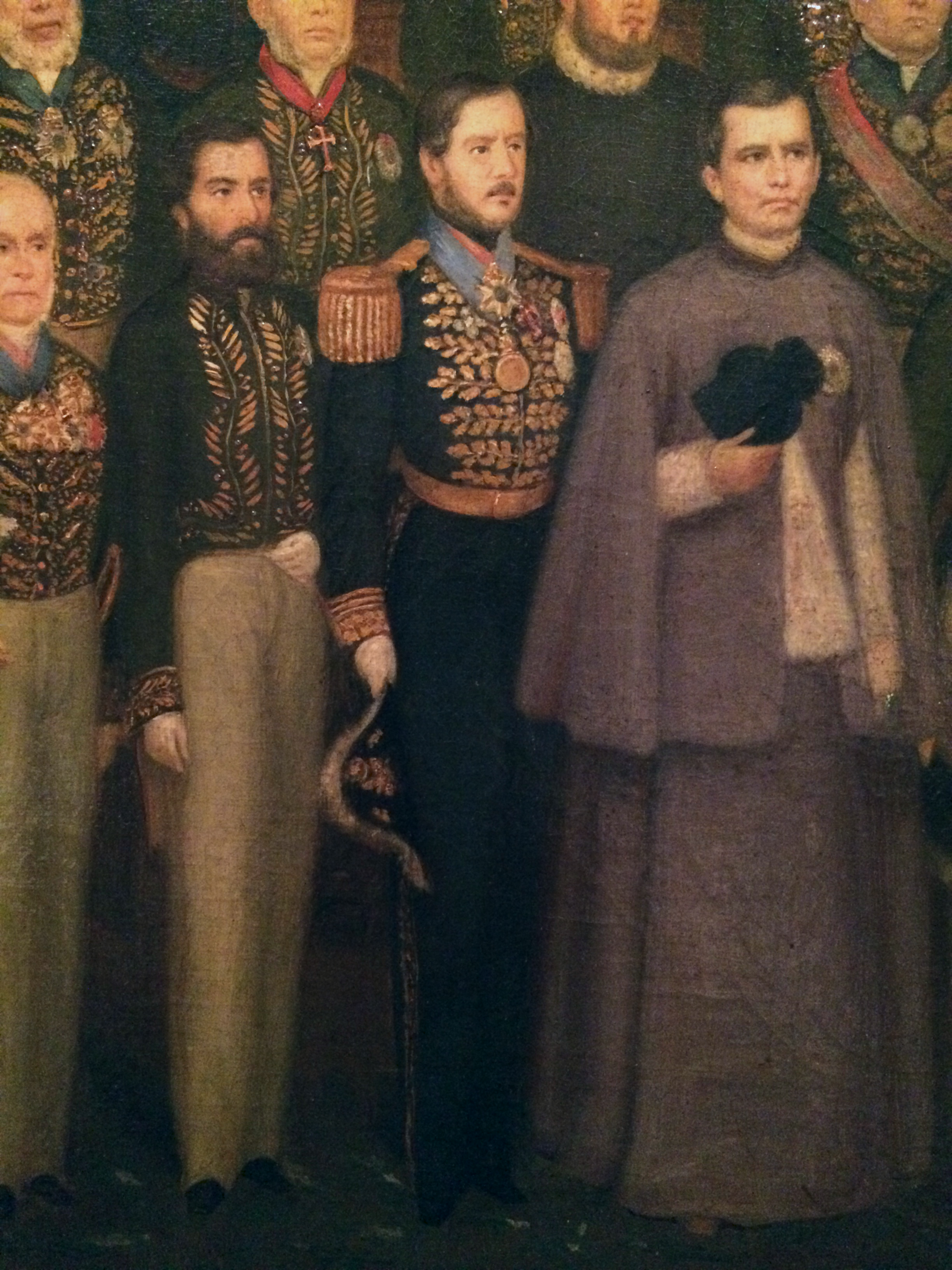
Detail of a painting by Frederico Tirone depicting Porto Alegre (center) during the constitutional oath of Princess Isabel in 1860

== Paraguayan War ==
=== Siege of Uruguaiana ===
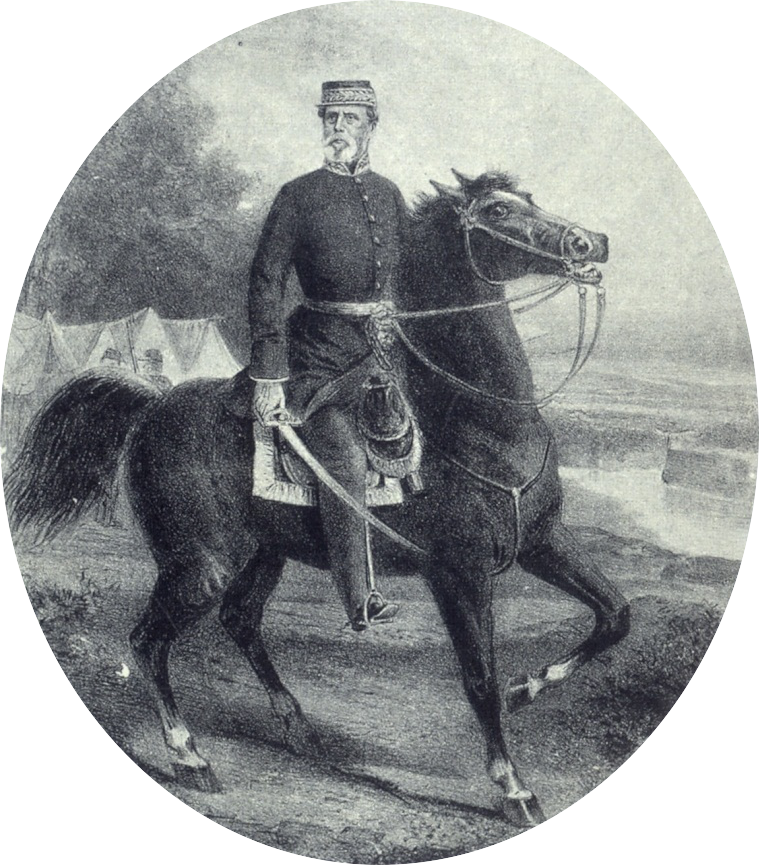
Porto Alegre around age 62, c. 1866

In December 1864, the dictator of Paraguay, Francisco Solano López, ordered the invasion of the Brazilian province of Mato Grosso (currently the state of Mato Grosso do Sul), triggering the Paraguayan War. Four months later, Paraguayan troops invaded Argentine territory in preparation for an attack on Rio Grande do Sul. The situation in Rio Grande do Sul was chaotic, and the local military commanders were incapable of mounting an effective resistance to the Paraguayan army. The Baron of Porto Alegre offered to return to active duty, and on 21 July 1865, the government gave him command of the Brazilian land forces in Rio Grande do Sul. He set out for Uruguaiana, a small town in the province's west, where the Paraguayan army was besieged by a combined force of Brazilian, Argentine and Uruguayan units.

Porto Alegre assumed the command of the Brazilian army in Uruguaiana on 21 August 1865. From the very beginning, he had an acrimonious relationship with Brazil's allies Bartolomé Mitre, president of Argentina, and Venancio Flores, president of Uruguay, who led the armies of their respective nations. The years had not lessened Porto Alegre's prejudice against Hispanic-Americans; on the contrary, his antagonism had increased. On 2 September, Flores suggested an immediate attack on Uruguaiana, an option rejected by Porto Alegre and Joaquim Marques Lisboa (then Viscount and later Marquis of Tamandaré), the commander-in-chief of the Brazilian navy. Tamandaré was a first cousin of Porto Alegre; their mothers were sisters. When Flores claimed that he could defeat the Paraguayan army alone, he was mocked by both Brazilian officers.

Since his arrival in Uruguaiana, Mitre had claimed the position of commander-in-chief of all allied forces participating in the siege—a precedence Porto Alegre vehemently refused to recognize. He reminded the Argentine president that, according to the Treaty of the Triple Alliance, the imperial army would be led by a Brazilian officer while on Brazilian soil. Porto Alegre later argued that "I would prefer to answer to a court-martial rather than to subject myself, in our territory, to the command of a foreign general". The dispute was temporarily forgotten when Pedro II arrived at the front. The Brazilian monarch settled the dispute when, at his suggestion, the allied army was divided into three forces, one led by Porto Alegre and the other two by Mitre and Flores. On 18 September, the Paraguayan garrison surrendered without further bloodshed.

=== Offensive in Paraguayan territory ===
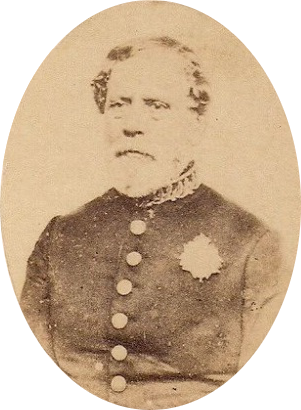
Porto Alegre, around age 63, c. 1867

The allies invaded Paraguay in April 1866, but after initial success, their advance was blocked by fortifications at Humaitá and along the Paraguay River. Porto Alegre had remained behind, leading the 2nd Corps and guarding Rio Grande do Sul. Mitre, no longer on Brazilian territory and acknowledged as the allied commander-in-chief, planned to use Porto Alegre's army to march through Paraguayan territory from the rear to surround Humaitá. As a result of a suggestion by Tamandaré—though Mitre had not issued orders for the move—Porto Alegre boarded his army onto Brazilian ships and instead brought them up to the positions occupied by the other allied troops.

On 18 August, Porto Alegre received instructions from Mitre to attack the Paraguayan fort at Curuzú. The operation would be carried out under the command of Tamandaré. Porto Alegre not only refused to defer to his cousin, arguing that both held the same rank, but also warned that he would operate by himself at Curuzú. Porto Alegre was incapable of submitting his forces to foreign direction and was unwilling to comply with orders issued by the allied commander. Nor was the situation among the allied forces improved once Porto Alegre and Tamandaré found common ground in their distaste for the Brazilian commander of the 1st Corps, Field Marshal Polidoro Quintanilha Jordão (later the Viscount of Santa Teresa). Jordão was ostracized for supporting Mitre and for being a member of the Conservative Party, while Porto Alegre and Tamandaré were Progressives.

Porto Alegre, who had been promoted from baron to viscount, led an amphibious attack that lasted from 1 September until the 3rd. His forces were victorious in the Battle of Curuzú. The allied army next marched to Curupayty, an outer line of defense of Humaitá. The Battle of Curupayty that ensued on 22 September was an immense allied defeat. The allied leaders blamed each other for disastrous failure at Curupayty, but the main focus of Porto Alegre's denunciations was Mitre. He said: "Here is the result of the Brazilian government's lack of confidence in its generals and giving its armies to foreign generals." To end the internecine squabbling, the Brazilian government placed Caxias in command of all Brazilian forces in Paraguay. Formerly friends, Porto Alegre and Caxias (a member of the Conservative Party) had been estranged by politics. (Note: The cause of the rift between Porto Alegre and the Marquis of Caxias and when it occurred are unknown. Porto Alegre founded the Progressive-Liberal Party along with a provincial Conservative chieftain, Luís Alves Leite de Oliveira Belo (a first cousin of Caxias).(Doratioto 2008, pp. 101–102) Porto Alegre and Oliveira Belo became estranged when, in 1858, the former supported Ângelo Moniz da Silva Ferraz's (later Baron of Uruguaiana) government to head Rio Grande do Sul, while the latter opposed it.(Doratioto 2008, pp. 114–115) Oliveira Belo found a supporter in Manuel Luís Osório (later Marquis of Erval), an important figure in the Historical faction of the Liberal Party that opposed Porto Alegre's Progressive faction.(Doratioto 2008, pp. 120–121) In 1862, Porto Alegre accused Osório of plotting the secession of Rio Grande do Sul in a secret letter. Caxias (who was also an enemy of Silva Ferraz) acquired this letter and sent it to Oliveira Belo, who showed it to Emperor Pedro II. The situation made Porto Alegre look like an intriguer and somewhat a fool.(Doratioto 2008, pp. 122–123) Whether the series of events ruined the friendship between Porto Alegre and Caxias is not clear. The break, however, became generally known, since even Pedro II in the same year included a mention in his private journal of Porto Alegre's animosity toward Caxias.(Calmon 1975, p. 671)) Tamandaré was replaced by Caxias' fellow Conservative Chief of Fleet Joaquim José Inácio (later the Viscount of Inhaúma), but Porto Alegre was kept on as head of the 2nd Corps. (Note: Claiming sickness, Porto Alegre was given a leave of absence on 27 November 1866. His request occurred just a few days after the arrival of Caxias, his former friend. Porto Alegre had returned to his post by 1 March 1867.(Rodrigues 1990, p. 135)(Rio Branco 1999, p. 139))

A little before dawn on 3 November 1867, the Paraguayans made a surprise attack on the allied camp at Tuyutí, breaching the Argentine lines. When Porto Alegre saw the mayhem—Argentine soldiers fleeing and Paraguayans inside the Brazilian perimeter—he shouted: "Aqui morre até o último brasileiro!" ("In here shall die the very last Brazilian!"). During the Second Battle of Tuyutí, as it was called, he fought with his saber in hand-to-hand combat and lost two horses one after the other. Porto Alegre and his troops, outnumbered three to one, stopped the Paraguayan advance and forced the enemy to retreat. Feeling very ill, and unable to mount a horse for a month, Porto Alegre was relieved of command on 27 January 1868. He returned to Rio Grande do Sul and was raised from viscount to count a few months later.

== Later years ==
=== Return to politics and death ===
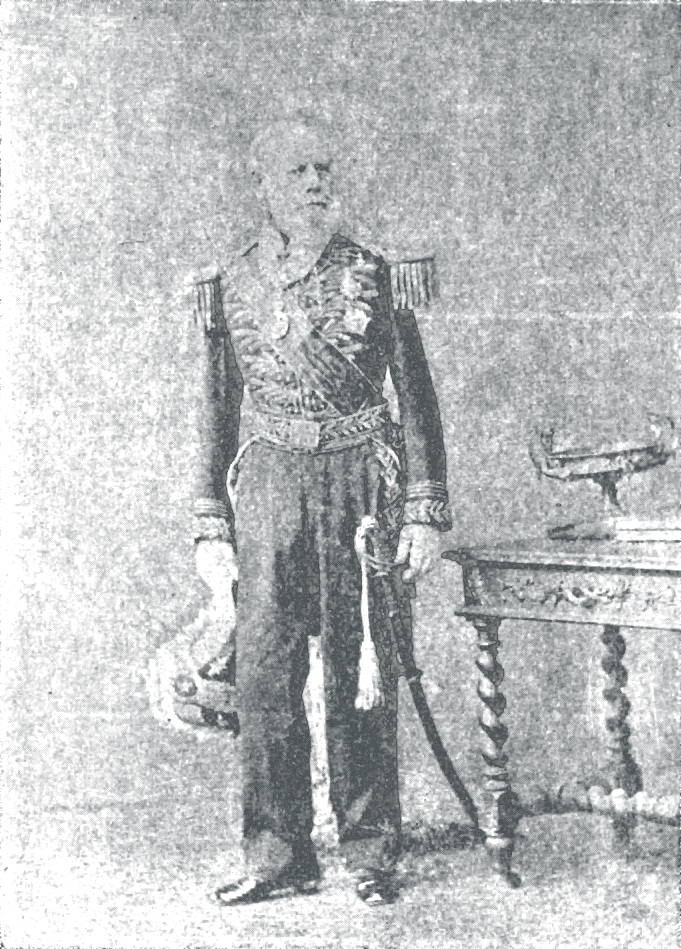
Porto Alegre around age 71, c. 1875

On 16 July 1868, a Progressive cabinet led by Zacarias resigned following a political crisis and Pedro II asked the Conservatives to form a new government. As always when a party returned to power, new elections were held, though marked by fraud. The two main wings of the Progressive Party (Progressive, to which Porto Alegre belonged, and Historical) set aside their disputes, became more disciplined in their unity and renamed their party the Liberal Party. When Porto Alegre's term as general deputy ended in 1866, the ongoing war precluded elections in Rio Grande do Sul. Predictably, in the elections organized under the Conservative Party's direction in early 1869, he was not elected. He turned his attention to organizing a Liberal stronghold in his native province. At the request of the national Liberal Center, Porto Alegre created and became president of the province's Liberal board of directors.

Around the same time, the count focused on two other projects: the first grew out of his longstanding interest in promoting literature and sciences, and the second, more ambitious aim was to fight for the gradual abolition of slavery. When in 1867 Pedro II openly asked for the gradual eradication of slavery in his Speech from the Throne, Porto Alegre was one of the few individuals who supported him, sending him a letter of congratulation. On 18 June 1869, the Partenon Literário (Literary Parthenon), a spiritual successor to the Historic and Geographic Institute of the Province of São Pedro, was created and Porto Alegre was made an honorary member. In one of its sessions, the count, who had already embarked on a plan of gradually freeing his own slaves, proposed the creation of a civil association devoted to slavery's abolition. His idea was not only welcomed but came to fruition. The Sociedade Libertadora (Liberation Society) was founded on 29 August, with Porto Alegre as its president, its primary purpose being the purchase of freedom for enslaved children.

Porto Alegre was elected general deputy in 1872 for the legislature that would be seated in that year. José Paranhos, Viscount of Rio Branco, headed a Conservative cabinet that faced strong opposition from its own party members. To widen the cabinet's base of support, the prime minister set the 1872 elections to gain more supporters of his cabinet, even members of the Liberal Party like Porto Alegre, in Parliament. While serving as a general deputy, he lived in a hotel. He spent his time either attending Parliament or in the house of his sister Joaquina Marques de Sousa, who had married a member of the influential Carneiro Leão clan. While leaving the house of fellow Liberal João Lustosa da Cunha Paranaguá (later Marquis of Paranaguá), Porto Alegre fell while boarding his coupé. The injury he suffered led to an abscess and subsequently gangrene. Despite the pain, he complained little, other than to utter: "This is too much." He died at 07:00 on the morning of 18 July 1875. His remains were accorded solemn funereal honors in Rio de Janeiro, Rio Grande and lastly, Porto Alegre. Among the men who carried his coffin in the imperial capital were Caxias, Rio Branco, Tamandaré and Irineu Evangelista de Sousa, Viscount of Mauá. He was interred in the cemitério da Santa Casa de Misericórdia (Holy House of Mercy cemetery) in Porto Alegre.

=== Legacy ===
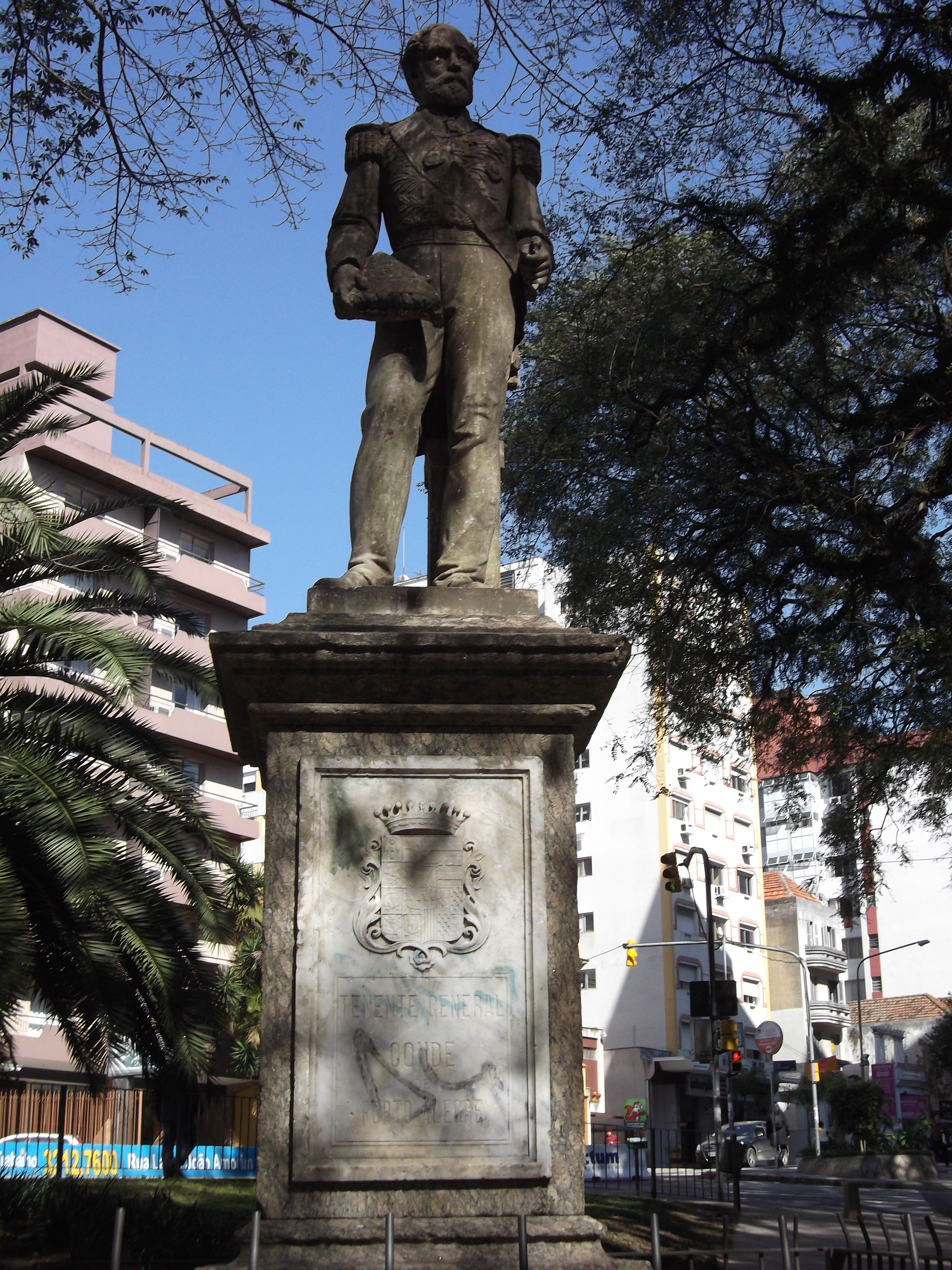
The statue of the Count of Porto Alegre in the city of Porto Alegre

The Count of Porto Alegre was admired during his lifetime and for some time after that. Felisberto Caldeira Brant, Baron of Barbacena (son of the Marquis of Barbacena) thought that "Marques de Sousa was the most brilliant type of soldier: heroic and patriotic." José Paranhos, Baron of Rio Branco, said that he was "one of the most illustrious warriors that Brazil has had." Alfredo d'Escragnolle Taunay, Viscount of Taunay, regarded him a "great warrior". Almost ten years after the count's death, a marble statue representing him was unveiled on 2 February 1885 in the city of Porto Alegre. The celebration was accompanied by popular joy and an artillery salute, and was attended by Dona Isabel, daughter and heiress of Pedro II, and her husband Prince Gaston, Count of Eu.

The downfall of the monarchy in 1889 brought sudden changes in how past events were viewed. The Ragamuffins were reframed as heroes in Rio Grande do Sul, and Porto Alegre became an awkward reminder and symbol of the fallen regime. The memories of other imperial officers, Porto Alegre's contemporaries, were subject to the same sort of revisionism, including the Duke of Caxias. After Porto Alegre's death, a marble tablet with the inscription "Here was born the worthy Count of Porto Alegre" was put at the entrance of the house where he was born. The plaque was removed in 1893 by the property's owner and left to deteriorate. In the late 1890s, historian Afredo Ferreira Rodrigues lamented that it was the "testimony of one day's passing gratitude and of the indifference, of the abandonment, of the ingratitude, in which we [Brazilians], a people without civic education, know how to prize the services of the great men of the past." Although the Brazilian army remembered Caxias and celebrated his centennial in 1903, Porto Alegre's centennial in 1904 passed unnoticed.

The work of historians has restored Porto Alegre's reputation to a certain extent. Heitor Lira said that "Porto Alegre was certainly an officer of great valor". Antônio da Rocha Almeida considered Porto Alegre "one of the greatest soldiers of Brazil". Gustavo Barroso regarded him "the greatest military figure in Brazil, after Caxias and Osório". Dante de Laytano said that he "was one of the most brilliant military leaders in the History of Brazil." On 16 October 1974, Porto Alegre was accorded the minor honor of being designated the patrono (protector) of the 8th Cavalry regiment, which was given the name "Regimento Conde de Porto Alegre" (Count of Porto Alegre Regiment).

== Titles and honors ==
=== Titles of nobility ===
Arms of the Count of Porto Alegre

- Baron of Porto Alegre (Grandee) on 3 March 1852
- Viscount of Porto Alegre (Grandee) on 28 August 1866
- Count of Porto Alegre on 11 April 1868

=== Other titles ===
- President of the Historic and Geographic Institute of the Province of São Pedro (Rio Grande do Sul)
- Honorary member of the Literary Parthenon of Porto Alegre
- President of the Liberation Society

=== Honors ===
- Grand Cross of the Order of Christ
- Dignitary of the Brazilian Order of the Southern Cross
- Knight of the Order of Saint Benedict of Aviz

=== Military honors ===
- Medal of the Cisplatine Campaign (1811 and 1812)
- Medal of the Cisplatine Campaign (1815 to 1820)
- Medal of Monte Caseros
- Medal of Uruguaiana
- Medal of Merit due to military bravery
- Medal of Paraguay

== See also ==
- List of generals of the Empire of Brazil

== Bibliography ==
- Almeida, Antônio da Rocha (1961). Vultos da pátria: os brasileiros mais ilustres de seu tempo (in Portuguese). Vol. 1. Rio de Janeiro: Globo.
- Barroso, Gustavo (2000). A Guerra do Rosas: 1851–1852 (in Portuguese). Fortaleza: Secult.
- Bento, Cláudio (1976). O negro e descendentes na sociedade do Rio Grande do Sul (1635–1975) (in Portuguese). Porto Alegre: Grafosul.
- Calmon, Pedro (1975). História de D. Pedro II (in Portuguese). Vol. 1–5. Rio de Janeiro: José Olímpio.
- Cardoso, José Antonio dos Santos (1876). Almanak Administrativo, Mercantil e Industrial (Almanaque Laemmert) (in Portuguese). Rio de Janeiro: Eduardo & Henrique Laemmert.
- Carneiro, David (1983). História da Guerra Cisplatina (in Portuguese). Brasília: Editora da Universidade de Brasília.
- Carvalho, João Manuel de (1894). Reminiscências sobre Vultos e Fatos do Império e da República (in Portuguese). Amparo, São Paulo: Correio Amparense.
- Câmara dos Deputados (1889). Organizações e programas ministeriais desde 1822 à 1889 (in Portuguese). Rio de Janeiro: Imprensa Nacional.
- Correia Neto, Jonas (2004). "Atas das sessões do Instituto". Revista do Instituto Histórico e Geográfico Brasileiro (in Portuguese). 425. Brasília: Gráfica do Senado.
- Doratioto, Francisco (2002). Maldita Guerra: Nova história da Guerra do Paraguai (in Portuguese). São Paulo: Companhia das Letras. ISBN 85-359-0224-4.
- Doratioto, Francisco (2008). General Osorio: a espada liberal do Império (in Portuguese). São Paulo: Companhia das Letras. ISBN 978-85-359-1200-5.
- Dória, Luís Gastão d'Escragnolle (1909). "Coisas do passado". Revista do Instituto Histórico e Geográfico Brasileiro (in Portuguese). 71. Rio de Janeiro: Imprensa Nacional.
- Fonttes, Carlos (1994). Regimento Conde de Porto Alegre (in Portuguese). Uruguaiana: Continente.
- Freitas, Leopoldo de (1933). "Conde de Porto Alegre". Revista do Instituto Histórico e Geográfico do Rio Grande do Sul (in Portuguese). 13. Porto Alegre: Barcellos, Bertaso & cia.
- Lazzari, Alexandre (2004). Entre a grande e a pequena pátria: literatos, identidade gaúcha e nacionalidade 1860–1910) (Doctorate thesis) (in Portuguese). Universidade Estadual de Campinas.
- Lira, Heitor (1977). História de Dom Pedro II (1825–1891): Ascenção (1825–1870) (in Portuguese). Vol. 1. Belo Horizonte: Itatiaia.
- Laytano, Dante de (1983). "Traços gerais das inter-relações histórico-culturais da Bahia e do Rio Grande do Sul". Revista do Instituto Histórico e Geográfico Brasileiro (in Portuguese). 338. Rio de Janeiro: Imprensa Nacional.
- Maul, Carlos; Antunes, Deoclécio de Paranhos; Graça, Jaime Ribeiro da (2005). Conde de Porto Alegre (in Portuguese) (2 ed.). Porto Alegre: Gênesis Edições. ISBN 85-87578-15-4.
- Morais, Eugênio Vilhena (2003). O Duque de Ferro: novos aspectos da figura de Caxias (in Portuguese). Rio de Janeiro: Biblioteca do Exército. ISBN 978-85-7011-329-0.
- Needell, Jeffrey D. (2006). The Party of Order: the Conservatives, the State, and Slavery in the Brazilian Monarchy, 1831–1871. Stanford, California: Stanford University Press. ISBN 978-0-8047-5369-2.
- Osório, Fernando Luís (1894). História do general Osório (in Portuguese). Vol. 1. Rio de Janeiro: Tipografia de G. Leuzinger & Filhos.
- Piccolo, Helga Iracema Landgraf (1974). A política rio-grandense no II império (1868–1882) (in Portuguese). Porto Alegre: Universidade Federal do Rio Grande do Sul.
- Rio Branco, José Maria da Silva Paranhos, Baron of (1999). Efemérides brasileiras (in Portuguese). Brasília: Senado Federal.
- Rodrigues, José Honório (1975). Independência: revolução e contra-revolução (in Portuguese). Vol. 2. Rio de Janeiro: Livraria Francisco Alves Editora.
- Rodrigues, Alfredo Ferreira (1990). Vultos e fatos da Revolução Farroupilha (in Portuguese). Brasília: Imprensa Nacional.
- Sales, Francisco (1959). "Almirante Marquês de Tamandaré". Revista genealógica latina (in Portuguese). XI. São Paulo: Instituto Genealógico Brasileiro.
- Siber, Eduard (1916). "Retrospecto da Guerra contra Rosas [Retrospect of the War against Rosas]". Revista do Instituto Histórico e Geográfico Brasileiro (in Portuguese). 78. Rio de Janeiro: Imprensa Nacional.
- Silva, Alfredo Pretextato Maciel da (1906a). Os generais do exército brasileiro de 1822 a 1889: traços biográficos (in Portuguese). Vol. 1. Rio de Janeiro: M. Orosco & C.
- Silva, Alfredo Pretextato Maciel da (1906b). Os generais do exército brasileiro de 1822 a 1889: traços biográficos (in Portuguese). Vol. 2. Rio de Janeiro: M. Orosco & C.
- Silva, João Manuel Pereira da (2003). Memórias do meu tempo (in Portuguese). Brasília: Senado Federal.
- Souza, Adriana Barreto de (2008). Duque de Caxias: o homem por trás do monumento (in Portuguese). Rio de Janeiro: Civilização Brasileira. ISBN 978-85-200-0864-5.
