= Historic and Geographic Institute of Rio Grande do Sul =

Brazilian organization

Coordinates: 30°01′54″S 51°13′43″W

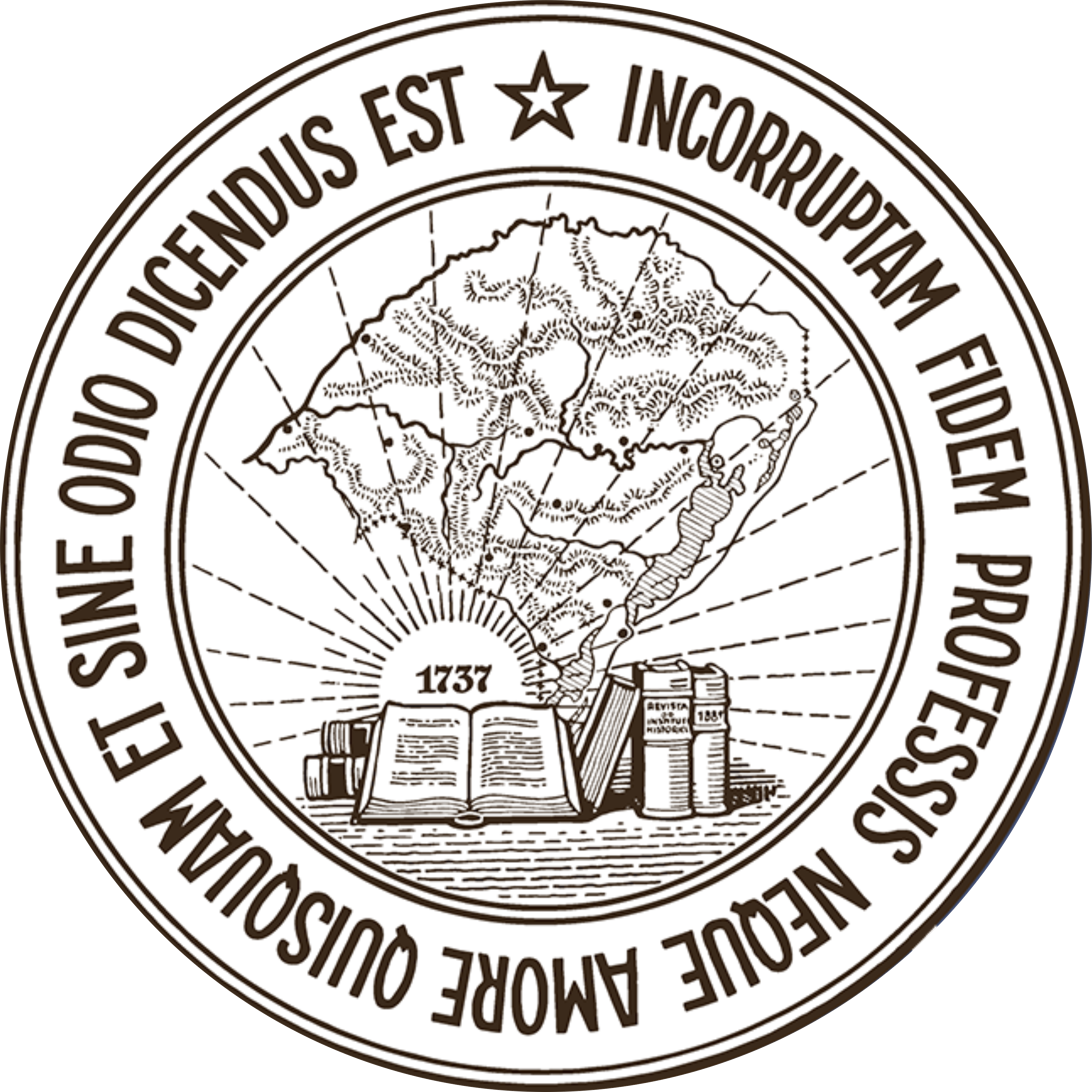
- Emblem
- Abbreviation: IHGRGS
- Formation: August 5, 1920; 104 years ago
- Legal status: Private non-profit institution
- Headquarters: Porto Alegre, Rio Grande do Sul; Brazil
- President: Miguel Frederico do Espírito Santo
- Administrative and Financial Director: Luciana da Costa de Oliveira
- Website: http://www.ihgrgs.org.br/

The Historic and Geographic Institute of Rio Grande do Sul (Portuguese: Instituto Histórico e Geográfico do Rio Grande do Sul), or IHGRGS, is a private non-profit institution based in Porto Alegre, and founded on August 5, 1920. Its main goal is to promote and spread the production of knowledge, especially focused on the state of Rio Grande do Sul. It went through several locations until it settled in the current building in Porto Alegre, inaugurated on March 25, 1972, which includes a research room, the Tomás Carlos Duarte Library, an archive room, the general library, the map library, and an auditorium with capacity for 150 people.

The institute has two large bibliographic collections at its headquarters (about 150,000 volumes in all), dealing mainly with the history and geography of the state, as well as anthropology, paleontology and folklore. In 2003, the Institute started informatizing its library.

Until the 1950s, the IHGRGS was the main producer and diffuser of historical knowledge in the state, even more than the Federal University of Rio Grande do Sul (UFRGS). In the 1930s and 1940s, with the celebration of the Ragamuffin War centennial and the historical congresses of Rio Grande do Sul, the IHGRGS reached its peak. However, from the mid-1940s on, there was a division between members who defended a renewal of the historiographical model and those who remained faithful to a more political and military approach. From then on, the Institute lost its hegemony in the local historical production.

The Revista do Instituto Histórico e Geográfico do Rio Grande do Sul was published quarterly and uninterruptedly from 1921 to 1950, appearing again in 1975; currently it is part of the UFRGS academic journal system and is published every six months.

== History ==
During the first half of the 19th century, most of the political debate in the Province of São Pedro do Rio Grande do Sul was concentrated in the press, which circulated opinions usually aligned to one of the parties in vogue in the city of Porto Alegre and in the interior.

In the historical field, since the creation of the Brazilian Historic and Geographic Institute (IHGB) in 1838, there was an interest in expanding the study centers throughout the country in order to incorporate the provinces in the creation of an official narrative of the Empire's history. Although the IHGRGS would only be created in the 20th century, it was preceded by other attempts to found study centers that would congregate intellectuals in the territory and carry out studies that guided an official narrative for the province.

=== Historical and Geographic Institute of the Province of São Pedro (IHGPSP) ===
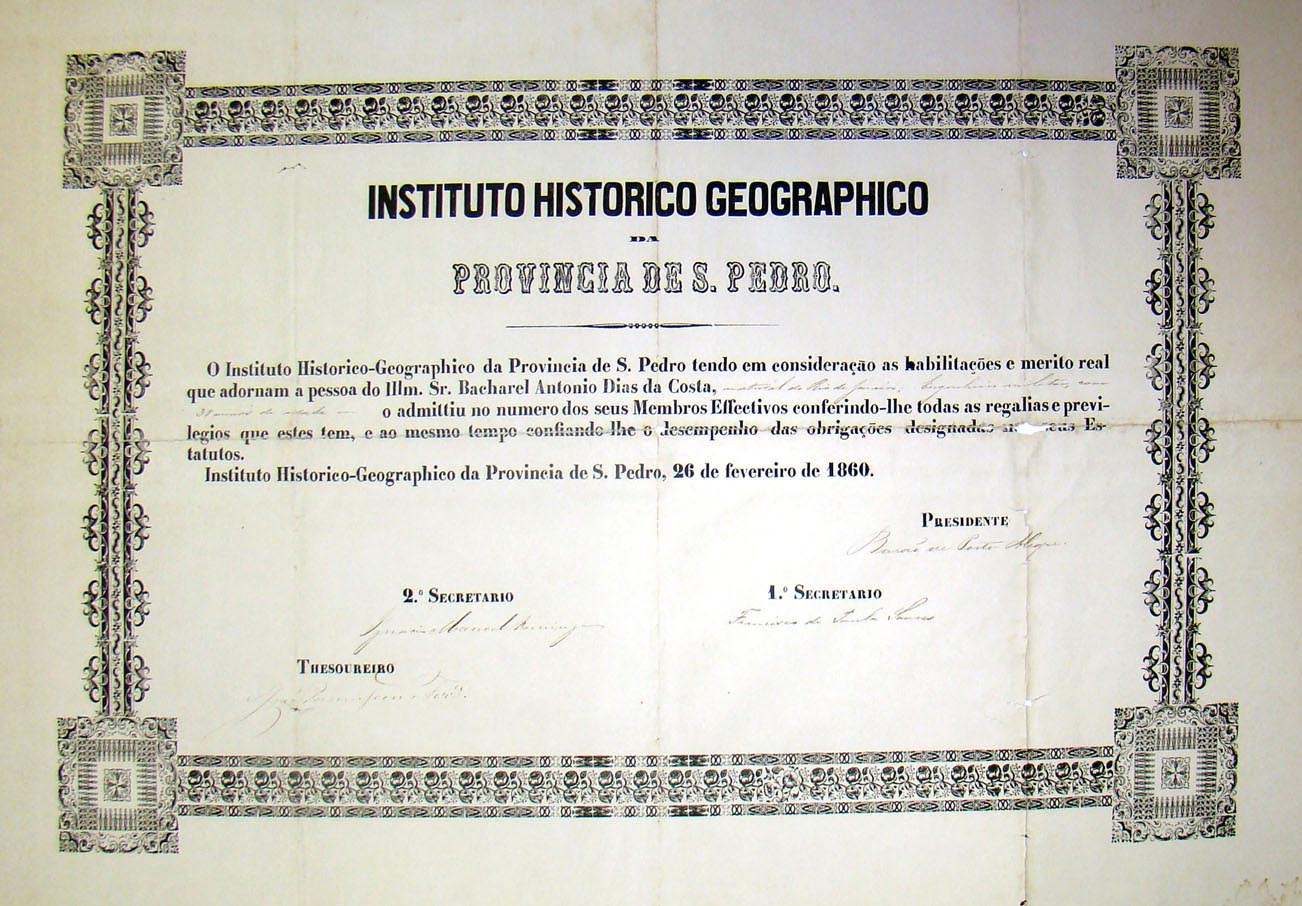
Diploma as a member of the Institute in 1860.

In 1854, there was an attempt to found a similar institution in the Province of São Pedro do Rio Grande do Sul. The Viscount of Sinimbu, at the time president of the province and member of the IHGB since 1840, was chosen for the board of directors, and Manuel Marques de Sousa, Count of Porto Alegre, was chosen as vice-president. The IHGPSP, the first regional historic and geographic institute created, was short-lived due to the Viscount's retirement from public office.

In 1860, the initiative of creating a provincial branch of the IHGB was renewed. The second version of the IHGPSP was also born linked to the provincial government, and its president at the time, Joaquim Antão Fernandes Leão, was elected a full member of the institution. This time, with the publication of the journal and a larger body of research associates, the IHGPSP's activities included provincial history studies to be inserted within the national context promoted by the IHGB since the 1840s.

=== Sociedade Partenon Literário ===
In 1868, the Sociedade Partenon Literário, a literary organization that emerged at a time of great debate among intellectuals, including the unfolding of the Paraguayan War and discussions in the abolitionist movement, was founded in Porto Alegre. Besides promoting intellectual exchanges among scholars in the former Province of São Pedro, such as debates, publications, seminars, and other activities, the Partenon Literário was one of the first associations to promote a type of regionalism in the province by exalting the figure of the gaucho farroupilha, which would influence other groups that emerged in the 20th century.

The participants of the Partenon Literário were men with a level of education that stood out from the rest of the population, mostly illiterate, who sought, through this space, for the construction of cultural codes and the creation of a certain ideal of society aligned to progress and modernity. This is expressed in the activities developed by the group, among them the night school, the seminars and, especially, the Revista Mensal da Sociedade Parthenon Litterario. Due to its progressive character, the magazine debated issues related to the abolition of slavery, women's emancipation in the imperial context, and republicanist agendas.

== Members ==
The founding members of IHGRGS were:

=== Effective ===
- Aquiles Porto-Alegre, teacher;
- Adroaldo Costa, lawyer;
- Alfonso Aurélio Porto, journalist;
- Afonso Guerreiro Lima, teacher;
- Alberto Juvenal do Rego Lins, lawyer;
- Alfredo Clemente Pinto, teacher;
- Amaro Augusto da Silveira Batista, engineer;
- Antão Gonçalves de Faria, engineer;
- Armando Dias de Azevedo, lawyer;
- Arthur Candal, teacher;
- Augusto Daisson, journalist;
- Benjamin Flores, journalist;
- Carlos Teschauer, priest;
- Delfino Marque Riet, financier;
- Eduardo Mafra Duarte, physician;
- Emílio Fernandes de Sousa Docca, military;
- Florêncio Carlos de Abreu e Silva, lawyer;
- Francisco Antonino Xavier e Oliveira, lawyer;
- Francisco de Leonardo Truda, journalist;
- Francisco Rodolfo Simch, lawyer;
- João Baptista Hafkemeyer, priest;
- João Bittencourt de Menezes, journalist;
- João Cândido de Maia, journalist;
- João Pinto da Silva, writer;
- José Paulo Ribeiro, notary;
- José Zeferino da Cunha, lawyer;
- Lindolfo Collor, journalist;
- Luiz Mariano da Rocha, monsignor;
- Manoel Theóphilo Barreto Vianna, military;
- Manuel Joaquim de Faria Correa, teacher;
- Miguel José Pereira, military;
- Olavo Franco de Godoy, lawyer;
- Oscar Miranda, military;
- Otávio Augusto de Faria Correa, teacher;
- Protásio Antônio Alves, physician;
- Roberto Landell de Moura, priest; (Note: According to Silveira, Landell de Moura is not included in the list published in the magazine in 1921, but he had been elected part of the Permanent Commission of Archeology, Ethnography and Paleontology.)
- Roque Oliveira Callage, journalist;

=== Correspondents ===
- Alcides de Mendonça Lima, lawyer;
- Alcides Maia, journalist;
- Alfredo Álvaro Maciel Moreira, lawyer;
- Alfredo Ferreira Rodrigues, journalist;
- Alfredo Augusto Varela de Vilares, lawyer;
- Álvaro Batista, physician;
- Augusto Porto Alegre, journalist;
- Demétrio Nunes Ribeiro, lawyer;
- Fernando Osório Filho, lawyer;
- Homero Batista, lawyer;
- João da Silva Belém, journalist;
- Joaquim Francisco de Assis Brasil, lawyer;
- José Vieira de Rezende e Silva, lawyer;
- Leopoldo Cruz de Freitas, lawyer;

=== Honorary ===
- Augusto Borges de Medeiros, lawyer; (Note: According to Silveira, Borges de Medeiros was the only honorary member to be admitted at the time, because he provided public spaces for the IHGRGS to carry out its activities and maintain its collection)

== Collections and research resources ==
The collection of the Historic and Geographic Institute of Rio Grande do Sul is diverse, and has different supports, including bibliographic, documental, iconographic, and three-dimensional. Access is free to most of the materials, after filling out a form with the researcher's data and paying a research fee. Photographic registration is allowed, and it is also possible to request scanned copies against payment. Part of the collection is also digitalized in the IHGRGS website.

=== Library ===
The IHGRGS library has an expressive volume of between 100 and 150 thousand books, of which around 22 thousand are already catalogued using the Universal Decimal Classification system. Largely made up of donations, including entire private libraries, the institute's bibliographical collection is in the process of being reorganized, among the sectors of general material, Personal Collections, and Rare Works Collection. Among the Personal Collections, the collection of professor Sandra Pesavento, donated by her family to the Institute in 2014 and in the process of cataloging and research since then, stands out. Besides the historian's personal library, the collection also includes her personal archives, which register, besides her scientific production, materials such as research notes, travel memories, personal objects, and photography albums.

Access to the material is made in the form of local consultation, upon request. It is also possible to receive prior consultation via e-mail, as well as to request digital reproduction of parts of the available works, for a fee.

== See also ==
- Brazilian Historic and Geographic Institute

== Bibliography ==
=== Articles ===
- Santos, Nádia Maria Weber (2019-09-04). "Apresentação do Acervo Sandra Jatahy Pesavento do IHGRGS (Instituto Histórico e Geográfico do Rio Grande do Sul)»". Artelogie. Recherche sur les arts, le patrimoine et la littérature de l'Amérique latine (14). doi:10.4000/artelogie.4184. ISSN 2115-6395.
- Santos, Nádia Maria Weber (2017). "Constituição e organização do acervo Sandra Jatahy Pesavento no IHGRGS". III Seminário Internacional História do Tempo Presente. ISSN 2237-4078.

=== Books, theses and dissertations ===
- Silveira, Daniela (2008a). O passado está prenhe do futuro" : a escrita da história no Instituto Histórico e Geográfico do Rio Grande do Sul (1920-30). UFRGS.
- Boeira, Luciana Fernandes (2008). Entre História e Literatura: a formação do Panteão Rio-grandense e os primórdios da escrita da História do Rio Grande do Sul no século XIX. UFRGS.
- Lazzari, Alexandre (2004). Entre a grande e a pequena pátria: literatos, identidade gaúcha e nacionalidade (1860-1910). UNICAMP.
- Silveira, Cássia (2008b). Dois pra lá, dois pra cá : o Parthenon Litterario e as trocas entre literatura e política na Porto Alegre do século XIX. UFRGS.
- Campos, Vanessa Gomes de (2018). Inventário dos Institutos Históricos e Geográficos no Rio Grande do Sul : de guardiões da memória à custódia do patrimônio (PDF). Historic and Geographic Institute of Rio Grande do Sul / State Secretary of Culture, Tourism, Sports and Leisure.
- Santi, Alváro (2004). Do Partenon à Califórnia: O nativismo gaúcho e suas origens. UFRGS. ISBN 978-85-7025-7260.
- Laitano, José Carlos Rolhano (2016). História da Academia Rio-Grandense de Letras (1901-2016) e Parthenon Litterario (1868-1885). Metamorfose.
- Silveira, Cássia (2019). Os intelectuais e a política no Rio Grande do Sul: conceitos e abordagens. Martins Livreiro.

=== Digital resources ===
- Historic and Geographic Institute of Rio Grande do Sul (2020). "Quem somos".
- Glória, Rafael (2020-04-30). "Instituto Histórico e Geográfico do Rio Grande do Sul completa 100 anos". Jornal do Comércio.
