= Brazilian ironclad Rio de Janeiro =

Imperial Brazilian Navy's armored gunboat

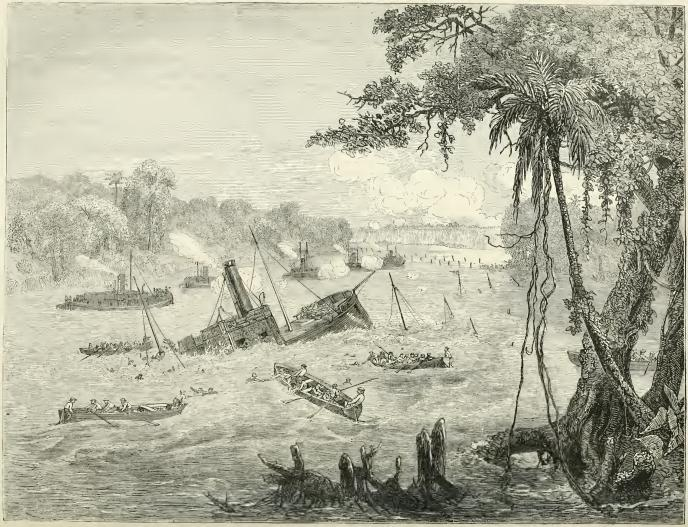
- Rio de Janeiro sunk by contact mines near Curuzú, River Paraguay

Class overview
- Operators: Imperial Brazilian Navy
- Preceded by: Tamandaré
- Succeeded by: Mariz e Barros class
- Built: 1865–66
- In commission: 1866
- Completed: 1
- Lost: 1

History

Empire of Brazil
- Name: Rio de Janeiro
- Namesake: Rio de Janeiro
- Builder: Arsenal de Marinha da Corte
- Cost: £47,409
- Laid down: 28 June 1865
- Launched: 18 February 1866
- Completed: 1 March 1866
- Commissioned: April 1866
- Fate: Sunk 2 September 1866

General characteristics
- Type: Armored gunboat
- Displacement: 871 metric tons (857 long tons) (normal); 1,001 metric tons (985 long tons) (deep load)
- Length: 56.69 m (186 ft 0 in)
- Beam: 9.19 m (30 ft 2 in)
- Draft: 2.62 m (8.6 ft) (mean)
- Installed power: 320 ihp (240 kW)
- Propulsion: 1 shaft, 1 steam engine, 2 boilers
- Sail plan: Schooner-rigged
- Speed: 9 knots (17 km/h; 10 mph)
- Complement: 148 officers and men
- Armament: 2 × 70-pounder Whitworth guns; 2 × 68-pounder guns
- Armor: Belt: 51–102 mm (2.0–4.0 in); Casemate: 102 mm (4.0 in); Deck: 12.7 mm (0.50 in)

The Brazilian ironclad Rio de Janeiro was an armored gunboat (Portuguese: Canhoneira Couraçada Nr. 3) built for the Brazilian Navy during the Paraguayan War in the mid-1860s. Like the other two gunboats she was built in Brazil and was designed as a casemate ironclad. Commissioned in April 1866, the ship did not enter combat until September, when she bombarded Paraguayan fortifications at Curuzu. Rio de Janeiro hit two mines on 2 September and rapidly sank, taking 53 of her crew with her.

== Design and description ==
Rio de Janeiro was designed to meet the need of the Brazilian Navy for a small, simple, shallow-draft armored gunboat capable of withstanding heavy fire. A casemate ironclad design was chosen for ease of construction and a bronze ram, 1.8 meters (5 ft 11 in) long, was fitted. The hull was sheathed with Muntz metal to reduce biofouling. For sea passages the ship's freeboard could be increased to 1.7 meters (5 ft 7 in) by use of removable bulwarks 1.1 meters (3 ft 7 in) high. On riverine operations, the bulwarks and the ship's masts, were usually removed.

The ship measured 56.69 meters (186 ft 0 in) long overall, with a beam of 9.19 meters (30 ft 2 in) and had a mean draft of 2.62 meters (8 ft 7 in). Rio de Janeiro normally displaced 871 metric tons (857 long tons) and 1,001 metric tons (985 long tons) at deep load. Her crew numbered 148 officers and men.

=== Propulsion ===
Rio de Janeiro had a single John Penn & Sons 2-cylinder steam engine driving a single 2-bladed propeller. Her engine was powered by two tubular boilers. The engine produced a total of 420 indicated horsepower (310 kW) which gave the ship a maximum speed of 9 knots (17 km/h; 10 mph). The ship's funnel was mounted directly in front of her casemate. Rio de Janeiro carried enough coal for six days' steaming.

=== Armament ===
Rio de Janeiro mounted two 70-pounder Whitworth rifled muzzle loaders and two 68-pounder smoothbore guns in her casemate. To minimize the possibility of shells or splinters entering the casemate through the gunports they were as small as possible, allowing only a 24°-arc of fire for each gun. The rectangular, 9.8-meter (32 ft 2 in) casemate had two gun ports on each side as well as the front and rear.

The 70-pounder gun weighed 8,582 pounds (3,892.7 kg) and fired a 5.5-inch (140 mm) shell that weighed 81 pounds (36.7 kg). The gun had a maximum range of 5,540 meters (6,060 yd). The 7.9-inch (201 mm) solid shot of the 68-pounder gun weighed approximately 68 pounds (30.8 kg) while the gun itself weighed 10,640 pounds (4,826.2 kg). The gun had a range of 3,200 yards (2,900 m) at an elevation of 12°. All of the guns could fire both solid shot and explosive shells.

=== Armor ===
The hull of Rio de Janeiro was made from three layers of wood, each 203 millimeters (8.0 in) thick. The ship had a complete wrought iron waterline belt, 1.52 meters (5.0 ft) high. It had a maximum thickness of 102 millimeters (4 in) covering the machinery and magazines, 51 millimeters (2 in) elsewhere. The curved deck, as well as the roof of the casemate, was armored with 12.7 millimeters (0.5 in) of wrought iron. The casemate was protected by 102 millimeters of armor on all four sides, backed by 609 millimeters (24.0 in) of wood capped with a 102 mm layer of peroba hardwood.

== Service ==
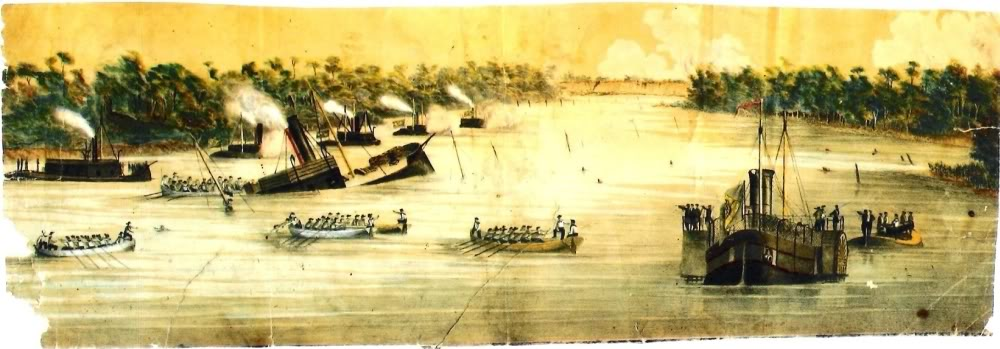
Battleship Rio de Janeiro sunk by a torpedo in front of Curuzú (painted by Adolfo Methfessel).

Rio de Janeiro was laid down at the Arsenal de Marinha da Corte in Rio de Janeiro on 28 June 1865, during the Paraguayan War, which saw Argentina, Brazil and Uruguay allied against Paraguay. She was launched on 18 February 1866 and completed on 1 March 1866. Commissioned in April she reached the combat zone on 4 May. The ship reached Corrientes, with the ironclad Lima Barros, in July 1866. On 1 September Rio de Janeiro bombarded the Paraguayan fortifications at Curuzú in company with the other Brazilian ironclads. A 68-pounder shell entered one of her gunports during the bombardment, killing four men and wounding five. The next day, after her damage was repaired, the ship struck two floating mines ('torpedoes') in the River Paraguay while trying to rendezvous with the other Brazilian ironclads bombarding Curupayty. Rio de Janeiro sank instantly with the loss of 53 of her crew. She remains there, entombed under some 15 meters (49 ft 3 in) of sand.

== See also ==
- List of historical ships of the Brazilian Navy
