= Manuel Marques de Sousa II =

Brazilian military officer (1780–1824)

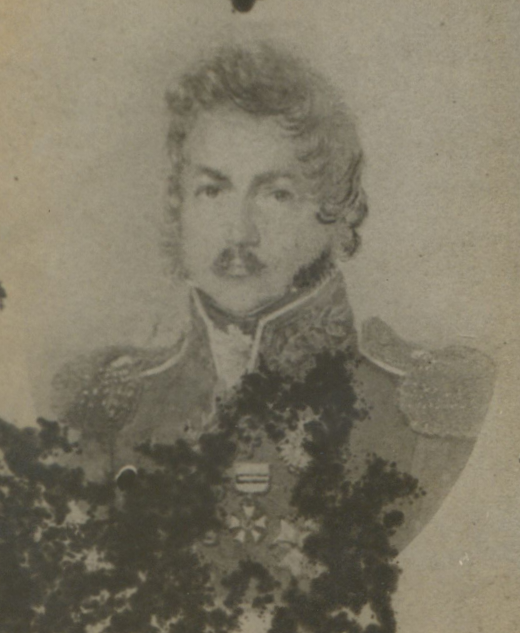
- Marques de Sousa, c. 1823–1824
- Born: Manuel Marques de Sousa; 14 January or 24 October 1780; Porto Alegre or Rio Grande, Rio Grande do Sul, Brazil
- Died: 21 November 1824 (aged 44); Near Montevideo, Cisplatina, Brazil
- Cause of death: Poisoning
- Children: 6, including Manuel
- Military career
- Branch: Imperial Brazilian Army
- Service years: 17??–1824
- Rank: Brigadier
- Conflicts: War of the Oranges; First Banda Oriental Campaign; Second Banda Oriental Campaign; Capture of Santa Teresa Fortress; Battle of Chafalote; Battle of India Muerta (WIA); Brazilian War of Independence; Battle of Las Piedras

Manuel Marques de Sousa (24 October 1780 – 21 November 1824) was a Brazilian general. He is usually called Manuel Marques de Sousa II to distinguish him from his father and son, both also generals.

== Biography ==
Manuel Marques de Sousa was born in Porto Alegre (or Rio Grande) in the Province of Rio Grande de São Pedro, Brazil, on 24 October 1780. He was the firstborn child of Lieutenant General Manuel Marques de Sousa and Joaquina de Azevedo Lima. Through his sisters Joaquina and Maria, he was the brother-in-law of Marshals Alexandre Elói Portelli and Joaquim de Oliveira Álvares, respectively.

At a young age, he enlisted in the Light Cavalry Legion, which was quartered in the city of Rio Grande, and was soon promoted to adjutant lieutenant (tenente ajudante) for his acts of bravery in the campaign of 1801. By royal charter dated 25 July 1808, he was promoted to captain of the 2nd Company of the same unit.

In June 1811, he crossed the Brazil–Uruguay border, bringing part of the column led by his father, which was mobilizing to join forces with the column led by Marshal Joaquim Xavier Curado to form the "Pacifying Army of the Banda Oriental", commanded by D. Diogo de Sousa. Manuel would take part in the combats that took place during the Army's march until its stop in Maldonado in early October. In January of the following year, he left for Buenos Aires to carry out a confidential mission that had been entrusted to him by the commander of the Pacifying Army, returning to Maldonado a few days later.

He would be promoted to sergeant major for the Legion on 13 May 1813 and return to Rio Grande do Sul. Once there, he would have been tasked by the Marquis of Alegrete with assaulting and capturing Santa Thereza Fort, which he did in August 1816. Marques de Sousa had at his disposal a column composed of 100 cavalrymen from the São Paulo Legion and two companies of the Rio Grande Militias Regiment. On the 24th of the following month, he would defeat a body of soldiery of 300 men of the column of Fructuoso Rivera, assistant of José Gervasio Artigas.

Marques de Sousa's column was incorporated into the Portuguese division commanded by Lieutenant General Carlos Frederico Lecor, taking part in the Battle of India Muerta, where he was injured. He was promoted to lieutenant colonel of the Volunteer Cavalry Legion of Rio Grande do Sul, by royal charter of 24 June 1817. After Montevideo was occupied by Lecor, King John VI promoted him to colonel, by another royal charther dated 26 October of the same year.

On 17 January 1822, Marques de Sousa was promoted to brigadier. At the time of Brazil's independence, Portuguese General D. Álvaro da Costa took control of the government of Montevideo, forcing Lecor to take refuge in Canelones. Lecor sought out people to fight him, with Marques de Sousa and Fructoso Rivera (serving Brazil since 1820) joining forces. Portuguese troops garrisoning Montevideo attacked the besieging army, but were defeated by Marques de Sousa at Las Piedras.

He died of poisoning in Montevideo on 21 November 1824, at the age of 44. He had six children with D. Senhorinha Inácia da Silveira: Manuel, future Count of Porto Alegre, Joaquim, Joana, Maria Joaquina, Sebastião and Domingos.

He was professed in the Military Order of St. Benedict of Avis, an officer of the Imperial Order of the Cross and awarded the medals for the Southern campaigns of 1811–1812, 1815–1820, and 1817–1822, as well with a special medal awarded to the land and naval forces commanded by Lecor.
