= List of wars involving Argentina =

This is a list of wars involving the Argentine Republic and its predecessor states from the colonial period to present day.

- Argentine victory: in case of an international victory or just a bellic victory/inconclusive conflict with favorable ending.
- Argentine defeat: in the case of an international bellic defeat.
- Indecisive, inconclusive or Treaty of Peace: in the case of an international conflict, but with an unclear or left to interpretation
  result or a treaty of peace between two belligerents.
- Internal confrontation: in the case of an Argentine internal conflict, whatever the winning faction. This doesn't applies
  if the rebel faction is part of another country's troops.
- Ongoing: in case that Argentina participates in an armed conflict that has not yet concluded

== Inca Empire ==
Conflict	Combatant 1	Combatant 2	Results
Inca conquest of northern Argentina (1479)	Inca Empire; Mitimaes; Yanacona; Allied natives	Diaguitas; Huarpes; Omaguacas; Atacamas; Comechingones; Guaycuru peoples Chichas	Victory of the Inca Empire: The territories are incorporated into the Collasuyo.; The towns are submitted to the Empire's state economic and labor administration system.; Beginning of the acculturation of the natives.; Continuation of hostilities against the Guarani tribes.; Fails expansion attempt towards the northern Chaco.

== Colonial Argentina (1536–1810) ==
Conflict	Combatant 1	Combatant 2	Results	Notable battles
First attempt of colonizing Buenos Aires (1536–1541)	Spanish Empire: Port of Santa Maria del Buen Aire	Querandí; Help from: Charrúa; Guaraní; Chana; Timbú	Defeat: The city is burned down by the natives in 1536, it was later reconstructed by the conquerors; The Spanish destroy the city and migrate to Asunción in 1541	
First Calchaquí War (1560–1563)	Spanish Empire: Tucuman Governorate	Diaguita Confederation; Omaguacas	Defeat: Various Spanish cities destroyed; Weakening of the Diaguita leadership and later acceptance of the encomienda by the natives	
Spanish conquest of Mesopotamia (1573–1583)	Spanish Empire: Río de la Plata and Paraguay Governorate; Jesuitic Guaraní Tribes	Charrúan Complex; Querandí; Guaraní	Victory: Rise of the tensions with the Portuguese conquerors; Death of Juan de Garay	
Revolution of the Seven Chiefs (1580)	Spanish Empire: Río de la Plata and Paraguay Governorate	Rebel Criollos	Government victory: Revolution crushed	
Viltipoco Rebellion (1582)	Spanish Empire: Tucuman Governorate	Omaguacas	Victory: Rebellion against the encomienda crushed; Omaguacas' land annexed to the Spanish territory	
Conflicts against Pirates (1582–1724)	Spanish Empire: Río de la Plata and Paraguay Governorate	Kingdom of England; Kingdom of France; Kingdom of Denmark; Portuguese Empire	Victory: The island Martín García remains in Spanish control; Attacks on Buenos Aires repelled; Pirate incursions dramatically reduced; Foundation of Montevideo	
Second Calchaquí War (1630–1637)	Spanish Empire: Tucuman Governorate	Diaguita Confederation	Indecisive: The Spanish Empire defeat and annex the Diaguitas, but are unable to annex the rest of the confederation.; The natives get rid of the encomienda; The Quilmes become the leaders of the confederation	
Battle of Mbororé (1641)	Guaraníes of the Jesuit Missions; Jesuits	Bandeirantes from São Paulo; Tupíes	Jesuit-Guaraní Victory	
Third Calchaquí War (1658–1667)	Spanish Empire: Tucuman Governorate	Diaguita Confederation	Victory: End of the Diaguita rebellions; Full annexation of the Diaguita Confederation by Spain	
First occupation of Sacramento Colony (1680)	Spanish Empire: Río de la Plata Governorate; Tucuman Governorate; Paraguay Governorate	Portuguese Empire: Colonial Brazil	Victory: Spanish occupy Sacramento; Sacramento is given back to Portugal in 1683	
Battle of the Yi (1702)	Spanish Empire: Río de la Plata Governorate; Guaraní Tribes	Charrúa Tribes	Stalemate: 300 Charrúas were killed during the negotiations; Decisive weakening of the Charrúa forces	
Second occupation of Sacramento Colony; Part of the War of the Spanish Succession (1705)	Spanish Empire: Río de la Plata Governorate	Portuguese Empire: Colonial Brazil	Victory: Spanish occupy Sacramento; Sacramento is given back to Portugal in 1715	
Commoner Revolution (1721–1735)	Spanish Empire: Río de la Plata Governorate	Paraguayan Civilians	Government victory: Rebellion crushed; Paraguayan people lose their right to vote	
Spanish–Portuguese War (1735–1737)	Spain	Portugal	Portuguese victory: Status quo ante bellum	
Guaraní War (1754–1756)	Portugal; Spain	Guaraní tribes	Portuguese and Spanish victory	
First Ceballos Expedition; Part of the Fantastic War and the Anglo-Spanish War (1762–1763)	Spain	Portugal; Great Britain	Spanish victory	
Capture of Port Egmont (1770)	Spanish Empire: Río de la Plata Governorate	Great Britain	Victory: The Falklands are annexed to Spain as Malvinas; Withdrawal of both forces from the islands	
Spanish–Portuguese War (1776–1777); Part of the Spanish–Portuguese wars (1776–1777)	(Spain) Spanish Empire	(Portugal) Portuguese Empire	Spanish victory: First Treaty of San Ildefonso	
War of the Oranges; Part of the War of the Second Coalition (1801)	Kingdom of Spain; French Republic	Kingdom of Portugal: State of Brazil	Franco-Spanish victory in Europe; Portuguese victory in South America: Treaty of Badajoz; Question of Olivença; Territory of Brazil expanded; Portuguese territory returned, except Olivenza, and border territories, which remained in Spanish possession; France territorial guarantees in Trinidad, Port Mahon (Menorca) and Malta, as well as lands north of Brazil; Southern Spanish America loses territory to Portuguese Brazil	
British invasions of the Río de la Plata; Part of the Napoleonic Wars (1806–1807)	Spain: Viceroyalty of the Río de la Plata	(United Kingdom of Great Britain and Ireland) United Kingdom	Spanish victory: Both invasions repelled	Action of 2 June 1807 (2-3 June 1807) - Spanish victory; Battle of Miserere (2 July 1807) - British victory

== United Provinces of the Río de la Plata (1810–1831) ==
Conflict	Combatant 1	Combatant 2	Results	Notable battles
Spanish American wars of independence (1810–1833) Argentine participation in: Argentine War of Independence; Bolivian War of Independence; Independence of Paraguay (Note: The Argentine participation in the independence of Paraguay occurred in the failed campaign of Belgrano on Paraguay between 1810 and 1811.); Chilean War of Independence; Mexican War of Independence (Note: The Argentine participation in the independence of Mexico occurred on one occasion, during the privateer cruise La Argentina, when this ship attacked the coast of California in 1818.); Peruvian War of Independence; Ecuadorian War of Independence	Patriots; United Provinces of the Río de la Plata; Gran Colombia; Chile; Mexico; Peru; Bolivia; Paraguay; Supported by: United Kingdom (1815–1819); United States (1810–1819); Haiti; Indigenous allies	(Spain) Spanish Empire; Royalists; Mestizo mercenaries; Supported by: Russian Empire; Indigenous allies	Patriot victory: Disintegration of Spanish America; List: Bolivia; Chile; Gran Colombia; Venezuela; Colombia; Ecuador; First Mexican Empire; Mexico; Insurgents; Army of the Three Guarantees; Federal Republic of Central America; (Protectorate of Peru) Peru; Maynas; (United Provinces of the Río de la Plata) United Provinces; Paraguay; West Florida (annexed by the United States); Diplomatic recognition in 1821 (Portugal), 1822 (US), and 1825 (UK).; Spain retained the islands of Cuba and Puerto Rico until the Spanish–American War of 1898.; Banda Oriental and Spanish Texas become part of the United Kingdom of Portugal, Brazil and the Algarves and First Mexican Empire respectively.	Battle of Tucumán (24-25 September 1812) - Patriot victory; Battle of San Lorenzo (3 February 1813) - Patriot victory; Battle of Salta (20 February 1813) - Patriot victory; Battle of Martín García (10-15 March 1814) - Patriot victory; Battle of Yavi (15 November 1816) - Spanish victory
Portuguese Invasion of the Banda Oriental (1811–1812)	United Provinces	Portugal; Spain	Inconclusive: Status quo ante bellum; Signing of the Herrera-Rademaker Treaty; Withdrawal of Portuguese and (temporary) patriot troops from the Banda Oriental (Eastern Bank)	
Argentine Civil Wars (1814–1880)	1814–1876: Federalists: League of the Free Peoples (1814–1820); Argentine Confederation (1831–1861); Federalists rebels; Blancos: Gobierno del Cerrito; Supported by: Paraguay (1852–1870) 1868-1880; Autonomists	1814–1876: Unitarians: Supreme Directorship (1814–1820); Exiled Unitarians (1829–1852); State of Buenos Aires; Colorados: Gobierno de la Defensa; Supported by: (United Kingdom of Great Britain and Ireland) British Empire; France; Brazil; Paraguay (1844–1852) 1868-1880; Nationalist Liberals; Province of Buenos Aires (1880)	Sanction of the Constitution in 1853; From 1868 onwards there was a new civil war between the Liberals and Nationalists; Federalization of Buenos Aires in 1880	
First Argentine Civil War (1814–1820)	United Provinces of the Río de la Plata: Buenos Aires; Tucuman; Salta; Cuyo; La Rioja; Republic of Entre Ríos	Federal League: Banda Oriental; Entre Ríos; Corrientes; Santa Fe; Misiones Occidentales; Córdoba Charrúa Tribes Guaycuru Tribes Santiago del Estero	Consequences: End of the Federal League and the directory; Anarchy of the 20's; La Rioja separates from Cordoba; Creation of the Entre Rios Republic and Tucuman Republic; Separation of Cuyo into Mendoza, San Luis and San Juan; Reintegration of Santiago del Estero into Tucuman	Battle of Cepeda (1 February 1820) - Federalist victory
Portuguese conquest of the Banda Oriental (1816–1820)	Federal League: Entre Ríos; Misiones; Corrientes; Santa Fe; Córdoba	United Kingdom of Portugal, Brazil and the Algarves	Luso-Brazilian victory: Annexation of the Banda Oriental by the United Kingdom of Portugal, Brazil and the Algarves	Battle of Apóstoles (2 July 1817) - Federal victory; Battle of San Carlos (1817) - Luso-Brazilian victory
Battle of Makassar (1817)	United Provinces of the Río de la Plata	Malay Pirates	Victory: Bouchard continues his expedition on the Pacific Ocean; Incident on Jolo	
Incident on Jolo (Note: This incident occurred during the privateer cruise La Argentina, when this ship arrive to the island of Jolo in 1818.) (1818)	United Provinces of the Río de la Plata	Sultanate of Sulu	Victory: Reconciliation after the arrival of the Sulu leader; Bouchard continues his expedition to reach the Philippines	
Argentine Invasion of Monterey (1818)	United Provinces of the Río de la Plata	Spanish Empire: New Spain	Victory: Temporary occupation and looting of Monterey; Temporary raise of the Argentine flag on Monterey	
Martín Rodríguez Campaign (1820–1824)	United Provinces of the Río de la Plata	Ranquel Ulmanate	Victory: Territorial expansion to the west	
Conflicts against Ramírez (1820–1821)	Buenos Aires; Santa Fe	Entre Ríos Republic	Buenos Aires and Santa Fe's victory: The Entre Ríos Republic separates into the provinces of Entre Ríos and Corrientes	
Battle of La Rioja (1820)	La Rioja	Army of the Andes: Andes Auxiliary Division	Riojan victory: More autonomy of La Rioja; Francisco Aldao had to withdraw from the province of La Rioja; Nicolás Dávila takes over as governor of the province; Facundo Quiroga's first important victory	
Battle of Rincón de Marlopa (1821)	Tucuman Republic	Salta Province; Santiago del Estero Rebels	Tucuman's victory: Santiago del Estero separates from Tucuman as a new province; Catamarca's secession from Tucuman; End of the Tucuman Republic (which despite the name wasn't a country)	
Cisplatine War (1825–1828)	United Provinces of the Río de la Plata Thirty-Three Orientals	Empire of Brazil	Preliminary Peace Convention: Cisplatina becomes independent as Uruguay (Note: Articles I and II of the Preliminary Peace Convention, Câmara dos Deputados 1828, p. 121: Article I: "His Majesty, the Emperor of Brazil, declares the Province of Montevideo, today called Cisplatina, separated from the territory of the Empire of Brazil, so that it can constitute itself in a free State, and independent of all and any nation, under the form of government that it deems most suited to its interests, needs and resources."; Article II: "The government of the Republic of the United Provinces of the Río de la Plata agrees to declare, for its part, the independence of the Province of Montevideo, today called Cisplatina, so that it constitutes a free and independent State in the terms declared in the preceding article.")	Battle of Punta Colares (9 February 1826) - Inconclusive; Battle of Quilmes (29-30 July 1826) - Brazilian victory; Battle of Carmen de Patagones (7 March 1827) - United Provinces victory; Battle of Monte Santiago (7-8 April 1827) - Brazillan victory
Brigandage of the Pincheira Brothers (1825–1832)	Chile; Argentine Republic (until 1831); Argentine Confederation (from 1831 to 1832); Wallmapu Allies	Montoneras of Pincheira; Pehuenches Boroan Confederation	Victory: End of the Montoneras of Pincheira; Argentine campaign on the Desert (1833–1834)	
Second Argentine Civil War (1826–1827)	Unitarian Government: Buenos Aires; Tucumán; Salta; Catamarca; Venezuelan Mercenaries (Note: Venezuelan llanero mercenaries participed in the Battle of Rincón de Valladares)	Federal Provinces: La Rioja; Córdoba; Santiago del Estero	Federal victory: Bernandino Rivadavia resigns; Manuel Dorrego becomes the new president	
Third Argentine Civil War (1828–1831)	Interior League: Mendoza; San Luis; San Juan; Salta; Tucumán; Santiago del Estero; Córdoba; Catamarca; La Rioja	Litoral League: Buenos Aires; Entre Ríos; Corrientes; Santa Fe; Montoneras of Quiroga	Consequences: Fall of Manuel Dorrego; Rise and fall of Juan Lavalle; Rise of Juan Manuel de Rosas; End of the United Provinces of the Río de la Plata; Start of the Argentine Confederation	Battle of San Roque (22 April 1829 - Decembrist revolution) - Unitarian victory; Battle of Márquez Bridge (26 April 1829 - Decembrist revolution) - Federal victory; Battle of Famaillá (19 September 1841) - Federal victory; Battle of Caaguazú (28 November 1841) - Unitarian victory

== Argentine Confederation (1831–1861) ==
Conflict	Combatant 1	Combatant 2	Results	Notable battles
Fourth Argentine Civil War (1832–1838)	Argentine Confederation; Uruguay (1836–1838) Salta Province	Unitarians; Colorados (1836–1838) Jujuy Rebels	Federal / Colorado / Jujuy's victory: Causus belli for the War between Argentina and Peru–Bolivian Confederation; Unitarian uprising crushed; The Colorados take over Uruguay; Argentine invasion of Uruguay; Jujuy separates from Salta as a new province; Death of Facundo Quiroga; Start of the second term of Juan Manuel de Rosas in 1835	
Falklands Expedition (1831-1832)	(Argentina) Argentine Confederation	United States	A possible expansion of the United States into South America was avoided; Americans rescued; Suspects captured; Island evacuated; Temporary severing of Argentina–United States relations; Indirectly resulted in reassertion of British sovereignty over the Falkland Islands	
Desert Campaign (1833–1834)	Argentine Confederation; Mapuche Allies; Tehuelche Tribes	Mapuche Tribes	Victory: Argentine territorial expansion; Rise of the popularity of Juan Manuel de Rosas	
Boroan Conflict (1836)	Argentine Confederation; Ranquel Ulmanate	Boroan Confederation	Victory: End of Boroan influence on the Pampas; Calfucurá becomes the leader of the entirety of Puelmapu, forming the Confederation of Salinas Grandes	
War of the Confederation (1836–1839)	United Restoration: Chile; Peruvian restorers; La Fuente government (1837); Gamarra government (1838–1839); Argentine Confederation (since 1837)	Peru–Bolivian Confederation Orbegoso government (only in 1838)	United Restoration Army victory: Fall and dissolution of the Peruvian-Bolivian Confederation declared by Agustín Gamarra; Peruvian reunification and restoration of the republics of Peru and Bolivia; Exile of Andrés de Santa Cruz to Ecuador; Continue the Second Iquichan War; Through negotiations with Bolivia, Argentina recovers the territories of the provinces of Jujuy and Salta that were occupied during the war	
Tarija War; Part of the War of the Confederation (1837–1839)	Argentine Confederation	Peru–Bolivian Confederation	Inconclusive: Subsequent peace between the Argentine Confederation and Bolivia after the dissolution of the Peru–Bolivian Confederation; Through negotiations with Bolivia, Argentina recovers the territories of the provinces of Jujuy and Salta that were occupied during the war	
French blockade of the Río de la Plata (1838–1840)	Argentine Confederation; Supported by: Blancos	France; Supported by: Unitarians; Colorados	Victory: Signing of the Mackau-Arana Treaty: Blockade lifted Payment of reparations by Argentina to the French within 6 months. Return of Martín García Island to Argentina Return of captured Argentine ships Granting of "most favored nation" status (demanded by France). Theoretical political amnesty for opponents of Rosas (demanded by France) Precedent to the Anglo-French Blockade of the Río de la Plata	
Argentine invasion of Uruguay (Second phase of Guerra Grande) (1839–1843)	Blancos; Argentine Confederation	Uruguay	Victory: The Blancos party creates the Government of Cerrito, which controlled most of Uruguay.; The Colorados remain in control of Montevideo, creating the Government of La Defensa.; Great Siege of Montevideo.	
Uruguayan Civil War (1839-1851)	Blancos: Gobierno del Cerrito (since 1843); Federalists; Lavallejistas; Argentine Confederation (since 1839) Entre Ríos (until 1851)	Colorados; Gobierno de la Defensa (since 1843); Unitarians; (or anti-rosists); Corrientes (from 1839); Entre Ríos (from 1851); Santa Fe (from 1851); Empire of Brazil (since 1851); France; United Kingdom; Riograndense Republic (1839–1845); Italian Redshirts	Colorado victory: The Colorado Party triumphs in Uruguay.; In Argentina, Rosas is overthrown by Urquiza in the Battle of Caseros.; Argentine Unification War.	Battle of Arroyo Grande (6 December 1842) - Blanco victory; Battle of Vuelta de Obligado (20 November 1845) - Pyrrhic strategic Anglo-French victory, diplomatic Argentine victory
Fifth Argentine Civil War (1840–1841)	Argentine Confederation: Buenos Aires; Entre Ríos; Santa Fe; Mendoza; San Luis; San Juan; Santiago del Estero; Córdoba; Blancos	Unitarians: Jujuy; Salta; Tucumán; Catamarca; La Rioja; Corrientes; Support: France	Government victory: Death of Juan Lavalle	
Combat of Costa Brava (1842)	Argentine Confederation	(Kingdom of Italy) Redshirts	Victory: Giuseppe Garibaldi escapes to Montevideo	
Great Siege of Montevideo (1843–1851)	Besiegers: Cerrito Government; Argentina; Supported by: Federalist Party	Besieged: Defense Government; Unitarian Party; Supported by: Empire of Brazil; Entre Ríos (1851); Corrientes (1851); Italian Redshirts; United Kingdom; France; Piratini (1843–1845)	Ceasefire: The siege is relieved after the intervention of the Empire of Brazil and the Entre Ríos province of Argentina.	
Fourth Correntine Revolution (1843–1847)	Argentine Confederation	Corrientes State; Paraguay (since 1845)	Victory: Revolution crushed; Corrientes reintegrated into Argentina; Growth of Paraguayan influence on the disputed province of Misiones	
USS Congress incident (1844)	Argentine Confederation	United States	Status quo ante bellum: Maritime blocking of Montevideo resumed; Prosecution of the American officer, Philip Voorhees	
Paraná War (1845–1850)	Argentina; Supported by: White Party	United Kingdom; France; Supported by: Colorados; Redshirts	Victory: Arana–Southern Treaty; Arana–Lepredour Treaty	Battle of Vuelta de Obligado; Battle of San Lorenzo (1846); Battle of Quebracho
Correntine–Paraguayan War (1847–1850)	Argentine Confederation: Corrientes; Support: Entre Ríos	Paraguay Support: Brazil	Victory: Paraguayan army expulsed from most of Misiones except for Candelaria and Trinchera San Jose.	
Platine War (Sixth Argentine Civil War) (1851–1852)	Argentine Confederation Cerrito Government	Empire of Brazil Defence Government Argentine rebels: Entre Ríos; Corrientes; Santa Fe; Co-belligerent: Paraguay (1845–1850); Supported by: Bolivia; United Kingdom; France; Paraguay (1851–1852)	Brazilian-led allied victory: Buenos Aires clout over the Platine region ends; Brazilian hegemony in the Platine region starts; End of Rosas rule in Argentina	Battle of the Tonelero Pass (17 December 1851); Battle of Caseros (3 February 1852 - Allied victory
Seventh Argentine Civil War (1852–1862)	Argentina	Buenos Aires	Buenos Aires victory: Argentine reunification	Battle of Cepeda (23 October 1859) - Argentine Confederation victory; Battle of Pavón (17 September 1861) - State of Buenos Aires victory
Campaigns against Calfucurá (1855–1872)	State of Buenos Aires (until 1861); Argentina (1861–1872)	Salinas Grandes Confederation	Victory: Calfulcurá is defeated and dies one year after that	

== Argentine Republic (1861–present) ==
Conflict	Combatant 1	Combatant 2	Results	Notable battles
Uruguayan War (1864–1865)	Brazil; Colorados; Unitarians; Argentina	Uruguay; Blancos; Federalists	Victory: The Colorados take over the Uruguayan government; Start of the Paraguayan War	
War of the Triple Alliance (1865–1870)	Brazil; Argentina: Paraguayan Legion; Uruguay	Paraguay	Victory: Allied occupation of Paraguay; Argentina definitively asserts its sovereignty on the Misiones Province and other territories south of the Pilcomayo River; Brazil definitively asserts its sovereignty on Mato Grosso do Sul	Battle of Riachuelo (11 June 1865) - Brazilian victory
Eighth Argentine Civil War (1866–1867)	Argentina	Federals: Mendoza; San Luis; San Juan; La Rioja; (Chile) Chilean volunteers	Government Victory: Felipe Varela escapes from the country	
Ninth Argentine Civil War (1870–1876)	Argentina	Federals: Entre Ríos Province	Government Victory: Death of Justo José de Urquiza; Defeat of Ricardo López Jordán; End of the era of caudillos	
Conquest of the Chaco (1870–1917)	Argentina; Abipones Tribes	Guaycuru Tribes: Wichí; Toba; Pilagá; Mocoví	Victory: Annexation of a big part of the Gran Chaco	
Tenth Argentine Civil War (1873-1874)	National Autonomist Party	Liberal Party	Autonomist Victory: Autonomist party's rule of the country through 40 years	
Kolla Rebellion (1874–1875)	Argentina	Colla Tribes	Victory: Reestablishment of the government of Jujuy; Rebel survivors flee to Bolivia	
Revolution of La Boca (Unclear, either 1876 or 1882)	Argentina	La Boca Republic	Government Victory: The genoese revolutionaries are defeated and La Boca is reintegrated into Argentina; The republic would later reappear as a recreative micronation with no independentist intentions	
Conquest of the Desert (1878–1884)	Argentina; Allied Tribes	Mapuche and Pampas Tribes Chile (Battle of Aluminé)	Victory: Annexation of the eastern Patagonia; Chile would stop claiming the eastern part of Patagonia; Emergence of the military and political influence of Argentina in South America	
Revolution of 1880 (1880)	Argentina	Buenos Aires Province	Government Victory: Federalization of Buenos Aires; End of the Argentine Civil Wars; Buenos Aires loses its right to secede	Battle of Los Corrales (21 June 1880) - Buenos Aires victory
Selkʼnam genocide (1880–1910)	Argentina; Bounty Hunters	Selkʼnam Tribes	Victory: 3,900 Selkʼnams killed; Only around 900 of the deaths were directly inflicted due to most victims dying due to diseases unknown to them; Death of the last native speaker of the Selkʼnam language in the 1980s; Extinction of the Yagán domestic fox used by the Selkʼnam	
Argentine occupation of the Puna de Atacama (1885–1886)	Argentina	Bolivia	Victory: Annexation of most of the Puna de Atacama in 1888	
Revolution of the Park (1890)	Argentina	Civic Union	Government military victory, political defeat: President Miguel Juárez Celman resigns, Vice President Carlos Pellegrini assumes the presidency; Revolution crushed by the government	
Argentine Revolution of 1893 (1893)	Argentina	Radical Civic Union	Government military victory, political defeat: Revolution crushed by the government	
Russo-Japanese War (1901)	Empire of Japan; Support: Argentina	Russia	Japanese victory: Russia withdraws from Manchuria; Improvement of relations between Argentina and Japan	
Venezuelan Crisis of 1902–1903	Venezuela; Support: Argentina; United States	United Kingdom; Germany; Italy; Support: Spain; Mexico; Belgium; Netherlands; Denmark	Compromise: Venezuelan debt dispute resolved; European fleet withdraws; Argentina's Drago Doctrine becomes famous internationally	
Argentine Revolution of 1905 (1905)	Argentina	Radical Civic Union	Government military victory, political defeat: Sáenz Peña law sanctioned in 1912, which allowed secret, universal and mandatory suffrage; Revolution crushed by the government	
War of Chile Chico (1918)	Argentina; Carabineros de Chile	(Chile) Chilean Settlers	Victory: Incarceration of Chileans settlers; The settlers were released a month later they returned to Chile	
Strikes & Bolshevism in South Georgia (1918-1920)	Argentina: Compañía Argentina de Pesca; United Kingdom: Falkland Islands Dependencies	Bolshevik Party of South Georgia	Victory of the CAP and the other Companies: The working conditions and salary of the whalers would be improved; Revolution crushed by the government	
Tragic Week (1919)	Argentina: Argentine Patriotic League	FORA: Anarchists and Communists	Government victory: Rebellion crushed; Multiple human rights violations towards immigrants and Jews; First pogrom on the history of the Americas; Roots of fascism in Argentina	
Patagonia Rebelde (1920–1922)	Argentina: Argentine Patriotic League	FORA: Anarchists and Communists; Support: Carabineros de Chile	Government victory: Rebellion crushed; Facón Grande executed	
1930 Argentine coup d'état	(Argentina) Argentine Government	Nacionalistas	Rebel victory: Argentine military seizes power; Overthrow of Hipólito Yrigoyen; Start of the Infamous Decade	
Chaco War (1932–1935)	Paraguay; Support: Argentina; Italy; United States	Bolivia; Support: Czechoslovakia; United Kingdom	Paraguayan victory: Paraguay gets most of the disputed zone with Bolivia	
Radical Revolution of 1932	Argentina	Radical Civic Union	Government victory: Revolution crushed by the government	
1943 Argentine coup d'état: Combat of the ESMA	(Argentina) Argentine Government	United Officers' Group	Rebel victory: Argentine military seizes power; Overthrow of Ramón Castillo; End of the Infamous Decade; Rise of Juan Domingo Perón's popularity; Argentina remains neutral through most of World War II; Tension between the Allies and Argentina	
World War II (1945): Argentina during World War II	United States; Soviet Union; United Kingdom; China; France; Poland; Canada; Australia; New Zealand; India; South Africa; Yugoslavia; Greece; Denmark; Norway; Netherlands; Belgium; Luxembourg; Czechoslovakia; Brazil; Mexico; Chile; Bolivia; Colombia; Ecuador; Paraguay; Peru; Venezuela; Uruguay; Argentina	Germany; Japan; Italy; Hungary; Romania; Bulgaria; Croatia; Slovakia; Finland; Thailand; Manchukuo; Mengjiang	Victory: Collapse of the German Reich; Fall of Japanese and Italian Empires; Creation of the United Nations; Emergence of the United States and the Soviet Union as superpowers; Beginning of the Cold War; Regarding Argentina: U-977 and U-530 surrender to the Argentine Navy.; Several nazis secretly protected by Argentina by the use of ratlines.; Thousands of Argentine volunteers served with all three British armed services, particularly the Royal Air Force, as well as the Royal Canadian Air Force.	
Third Paraguayan Civil War (1947)	Paraguay; Colorado Party; Support: Argentina; United States	Liberal Party; Febrerista Revolutionary Party; Paraguayan Communist Party	Paraguayan government victory: Guerrillas defeated; Paraguay would later save Juan Domingo Perón from the Liberating Revolution.	
Revolución Libertadora (1955–1958)	Argentine Government: Loyal Armed Forces; Nationalist Liberation Alliance; CGT	Rebel Armed Forces; Civil Commands: Radicals; Catholic Action	Rebel victory: Argentine military seizes power; Overthrow of Juan Domingo Perón; Political persecution of Peronism	
Peronist Resistance (1959–1963)	Argentina	Peronist Youth; Uturuncos; Nationalist Liberation Alliance	Government victory: Rebel guerrillas dissolved some years after the conflict; Former members would join later join Montoneros or FAR	
1963 Argentine Navy revolt (1962–1963)	Azules: Argentine Army; Argentine Air Force	Colorados: Argentine Navy	Azules victory: Colorados revolt suppressed; Argentina joins the blockade against Cuba; End of military rule, presidential elections of 1963	
Cuban Missile Crisis (Quarantine Operation) (1962)	United States; OAS: Argentina; Venezuela; Colombia; Dominican Republic; Trinidad and Tobago	Soviet Union; Cuba	Consequences: Expulsion of Cuba from the OAS; Naval blockade of Cuba towards the USSR	
Guevarist incursion in Argentina (1963–1964)	Argentina	EGP Support: Cuba	Government victory: Disarticulation of the guerrilla; The failure of the guerrilla movement led Che Guevara to consider the possibility of participating in other places outside the country or on other continents.; The attempt of revolution, along with the later fall of Tacuara and the bad decisions taken by the government of Ongania would later provoke the Cycle of Azos and creation of far-leftist guerrillas	
Nazi insurgency in Argentina (1963-1966)	Argentina: Argentine Federal Police	Tacuara Nationalist Movement; Support: Nazi refugees UENS; Frente Nacional Socialista Argentino; Factions of the Argentine armed Forces; Arab League	Government victory: The Tacuara Nationalist Movement is dissolved; Founder of the guerrillas, José Joe Baxter, becomes communist and creates the ERP; Without Tacuara, far-left guerrillas begin to appear.; Former members would later become part of the Triple A to fight communism	
Laguna del Desierto Incident (1965)	Argentina	Chile	Victory: Argentina gets the disputed zone	
The Cycle of Azos (1969-1972)	Argentina	AUF; MPTW; CGT; PRT; Córdoba	Government military victory Rebel political victory: The uprisings are suppressed; Ongania, Levingston and Lanusse resign; The Military junta collapses in 1973; Juan Domingo Perón comes back from exile	
Dirty War (1967–1980): See also: Operativo Independencia	Argentina: Triple A; Support: United States	ERP; Montoneros; FAR; FAP; FAL; CPL; GEL; OCPO; Resistencia Libertaria; Support: Cuba	Government victory: Leftist guerrillas defeated mostly eradicated by 1979; 9,500+ guerrillas (4,500+ Montoneros and 5,000 ERP), hundreds of soldiers/police, and 3,252 civilians killed in political violence from 1969 to 1980	
Guatemalan Civil War (1960–1996) (Argentina helped since 1976)	Guatemala; Support: Argentina (1976–1983); United States (1963–1996)	URNG	Peace accord signed in 1996	
Beagle Crisis (1978–1984)	Argentina	Chile	Consequences (bloodless conflict): Signing of the Treaty of Peace and Friendship in 1984; Bioceanity of Argentina and Chile. Not mutually recognized.; Chile's support to the United Kingdom during the Falklands War	
Salvadoran Civil War (1979–1992)	El Salvador; Support: United States; Argentina (until 1983); Israel; Taiwan; Chile (until 1990)	FMLN; Support: Soviet Union; Cuba; Nicaragua	Ceasefire: Chapultepec Peace Accords of 1992; Restructuring of Salvadoran Armed Forces; National and Treasury Police are dissolved (new civilian-overseen police created); FMLN becomes a political party, its combatants are exonerated	
Falklands War (1982)	Argentina	United Kingdom	Defeat: Status quo ante bellum in South Georgia and the Falklands; Argentine occupation of Southern Thule ended; Collapse of the military junta	
Carapintadas Uprisings (1987–1990)	Argentina	Carapintadas	Government victory: Uprisings stopped	
1989 Attack on La Tablada Barracks (1989)	Argentina	Movimiento Todos por la Patria	Government victory: Argentine army and police victory	
Gulf War (Operativo Alfil) (1990–1991)	Coalition: Argentina; United States; Kuwait; United Kingdom; Saudi Arabia; France; Italy; Canada; Egypt; Syria; Morocco; United Arab Emirates; Pakistan; Oman; Qatar	Iraq	Victory: Iraqi withdrawal from Kuwait; Argentina is designated as a major non-NATO ally by United States	
Croatian War of Independence (Operation Bljesak) (1991–1995)	Croatia United Nations: Argentina; United States; Canada; Denmark; France; Jordan; Nepal; Spain; UK	Republika Srpska; Yugoslavia	Victory: Croatian forces regain control over most of RSK-held Croatian territory; Croatian forces advance into Bosnia and Herzegovina which helps lead to the eventual end of the Bosnian War; Argentine arms trafficking scandal	
Operation Uphold Democracy (Operative Talos) (1994–1995)	United States; Poland; Argentina	Haiti	Victory: Reinstatement of Jean-Bertrand Aristide as President of Haiti	
Siege of the Argentine Embassy in Venezuela (Operation Guacamaya) (2024–2025)	Argentina; Support: United States; Venezuelan opposition	Venezuela	Victory: Release and exile of the venezuelan opposition staff members on 6 may, 2025.; The siege on the Argentine Embassy ends	
Russian invasion of Ukraine (2022–present)	Ukraine; Support: Argentina; NATO; European Union; United States; South Korea; Japan	Russia; Support: Belarus; North Korea; Iran	Ongoing: Improvement of the Argentina–Ukraine relations	
Operation Southern Spear (2025–present)	United States: Puerto Rico; Venezuelan opposition Support: Argentina; Cuban opposition Dominican Republic; Trinidad and Tobago; El Salvador	Venezuela: Cartel of the Suns; Cuba; Support: Russia	Ongoing: US military buildup in the Caribbean; US oil blockade of Venezuela since 10 December 2025; The US military forces capture Venezuela president Nicolás Maduro and his wife; 2026 Cuban crisis	

== See also ==
- List of hostile incidents at the Argentine border

== Bibliography ==
- Câmara dos Deputados (1828). "Carta de Lei de 30 de Agosto de 1828" (PDF) (in Portuguese). Archived (PDF) from the original on 1 March 2022.
- Furtado, Joaci Pereira (2000). A Guerra do Paraguai (1864–1870) (in Portuguese). São Paulo: Saraiva. ISBN 978-85-02-03102-9.
- Golin, Tau (2004). A Fronteira (in Portuguese). Vol. 2. Porto Alegre: L&PM Editores. ISBN 978-85-254-1438-0.
- Halperín Donghi, Tulio (2007). The Contemporary History of Latin America. Durham: Duke University Press. ISBN 978-0-8223-1374-8.
- Soares, Álvaro Teixeira (2021). Diplomacia do Império no Rio da Prata (até 1865) (PDF) (in Portuguese). Brasília: Fundação Alexandre de Gusmão. ISBN 978-65-87083-17-9.
- Southey, Robert (1819). History of Brazil. Vol. 3. London: Longman, Hurst, Rees and Orme.
