= Argentine raid on Monterey =

- Part of Spanish American wars of independence
Date	24–29 November 1818
Location	Monterey, Alta California, Viceroyalty of New Spain
Result	Argentine victory: Temporary occupation and looting of Monterey; Temporary raise of the Argentine flag on Monterey

Belligerents
United Provinces of the Río de la Plata	(Spain) Spanish Empire: New Spain

Commanders and leaders
Hipólito Bouchard; Juan Martín de Pueyrredón	José Darío Argüello; José Bandini; Ferdinand VII

Strength
2 ships (La Argentina and Santa Rosa); ~200 men	Unknown number of local militia and garrison troops

Casualties and losses
Minimal	Unknown

The Argentine raid on Monterey also known as the Argentine occupation of California was a military action carried out between November 24 and November 29, 1818, by naval forces from the United Provinces of the Rio de la Plata (modern-day Argentina) under the command of privateer Hipólito Bouchard. This operation was part of Bouchard's broader Pacific naval campaign during the Argentine War of Independence, aiming to disrupt Spanish colonial control along the Pacific coast of the Americas.

Bouchard's forces temporarily captured and sacked the town of Monterey, California, then the capital of Alta California, a province of the Viceroyalty of New Spain. After destroying military and government buildings, his forces withdrew a few days later without establishing a permanent presence.

== Background ==
During Argentina's struggle for independence from Spain, naval raids were launched to challenge Spanish authority across the Pacific. Hipólito Bouchard, commissioned as a privateer by the revolutionary government, was given the mission of attacking Spanish holdings as far north as California.

In 1815 Bouchard started a naval campaign under the command of Admiral William Brown, wherein he attacked the fortress of El Callao and the Ecuadorian city of Guayaquil. On 12 September 1815 he was granted a corsair license to fight the Spanish aboard the French-built corvette Halcón, which had been bought for the Argentine State by Vicente Anastacio Echeverría.

After Bouchard's return to Buenos Aires, he decided to stay with the frigate Consecuencia for his next campaign. In concert with Vicente Echevarría the ship's name was changed to La Argentina.

On 27 June Bouchard obtained the Argentine corsair patent (a "letter of marque") that authorized him to prey on Spanish commerce, the countries of Spain and Argentina being in a state of war at the time.

== Invasion ==
Bouchard arrived with two ships, La Argentina and Santa Rosa, and approached Monterey in late November 1818. After issuing an ultimatum and receiving no response, his men launched an assault on November 24. The Spanish defenders, under José Bandini, were stationed at the Presidio Real de San Carlos de Monterrey, the main military fortification in Alta California.

== Occupation ==
The fortifications were outdated and poorly defended and were quickly overwhelmed, with the town and fort becoming occupied by Argentine forces.

The Spanish garrison offered minimal resistance, and after roughly an hour of combat, Bouchard’s forces succeeded in capturing the fort. The Argentine flag was then raised over Monterey, marking a symbolic assertion of Argentine presence on the Pacific coast of North America. Although the Spanish flag had long flown there as part of colonial rule, this event marked the first time an independent foreign nation had occupied and hoisted its flag in California preceding both the Mexican and United States flags.

Bouchard’s forces occupied Monterey for six days. During the occupation, they seized livestock and supplies, and set fire to several strategic buildings, including the Presidio of Monterey fort, the artillery headquarters, the governor’s residence, and various Spanish colonial homes. Despite the destruction of infrastructure, the civilian population was not harmed. After achieving their objectives, the Argentines withdrew on November 29 and continued their privateering campaign along the Pacific coast.

== Aftermath ==
Although the occupation was brief, the raid demonstrated the reach of the Argentine Navy and exposed the vulnerability of distant Spanish colonies. It also contributed to Bouchard’s reputation as a significant figure in the South American independence wars.

== See also ==
- Hipólito Bouchard
- William Brown
- United Provinces of the Rio de la Plata
- Alta California
- Spanish American wars of independence
- List of wars involving Argentina

== Sources ==
- De Marco, Miguel Ángel (2002). Corsarios Argentinos (in Spanish). Buenos Aires: Planeta. ISBN 950-49-0944-2.
- Alconada Mon, Hugo (27 November 2005). "Bouchard, el corsario argentino que ocupó seis días California" (in Spanish). La Nación. Retrieved 19 June 2025.
- Alconada Mon, Hugo (9 July 2024). “Día de la Independencia: la vez que California fue la pequeña Argentina tras plantar su bandera en Monterrey” (in Spanish). La Nación. Retrieved 19 June 2025.
- Serra, Alfredo (13 April 2019). “Bouchard, el bravo e insólito marino francés que logró que California perteneciera a la Argentina ¡durante seis días!” (in Spanish). Infobae. Retrieved 19 June 2025.
- Gobierno de la Nación Argentina – Armada (n.d.). “Capitán de Navío Hipólito Bouchard” (in Spanish). Retrieved 19 June 2025.
