= Corney (surname) =

Corney is a surname. Notable people with the surname include:

- Ed Corney (1933–2019), American bodybuilder
- Emma Corney (born 2004), English cricketer
- Liberto Corney (1905–1955), Uruguayan boxer
- Peter Corney (explorer) (died 1835), English sailor and explorer
