= Peter Corney =

Peter Corney may refer to:

- Peter Corney (explorer) (died 1835), English sailor and explorer
- Peter Corney (pastor) (born 1942), Australian Anglican theologian and pastor
