= Action of 2 June 1807 =

1807 naval battle of the British invasions of the River Plate

- Part of the British invasions of the River Plate
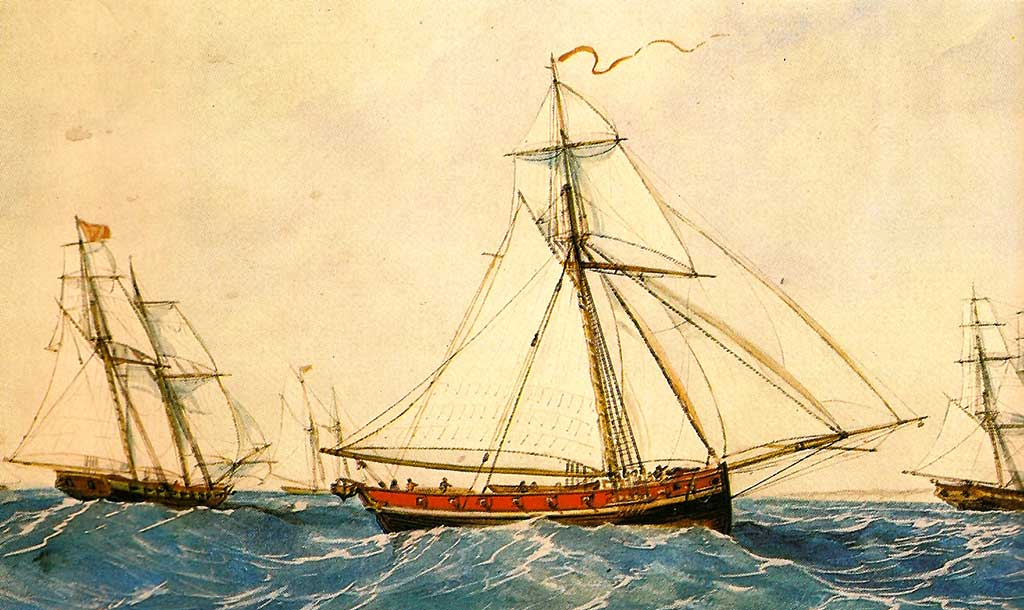
- A Spanish privateer sloop of war
Date	2–3 June 1807
Location	Mouth of Paraná Guazú 33°59′43″S 58°23′37″W
Result	Spanish victory • Safe passage of Spanish shipping to Buenos Aires through Paraná River

Belligerents
Spain	United Kingdom

Commanders and leaders
Francisco Pareja †; Francisco de Castro	G. Douglas

Strength
1 felucca 1 privateer	1 schooner

Casualties and losses
1 killed 8 wounded	1 schooner disabled 2 wounded

The action of 2 June 1807 was an engagement during the British invasions of the River Plate between a Royal Navy schooner and two Spanish small vessels, a privateer sloop and naval felucca, at the mouth of the Paraná Guazú. The encounter took place when the British warship, assisted by two armed boats, was searching for Spanish shipping off Punta Gorda, in the mouth of the Uruguay River.

== Background ==
The British naval presence in the River Plate during the invasions of 1806-1807 was permanent since the arrival of Admiral Home Popham forces in June 1806 until January 1808, well after the withdrawal of the officially sanctioned expedition led by General John Whitelocke. The blockade was formally declared on 16 June 1806, and Buenos Aires was occupied by the British on the 27th. On 4 August a Spanish naval force from Montevideo and led by Santiago de Liniers landed in San Isidro. The only opposition found by the Spanish convoy was the schooner HMS Dolores, that exchanged fire with the escorts without results. The shallow waters of the river played a key role in the outcome of the campaign, hampering Royal Navy's freedom of movement. After the first British invasion army surrendered at Buenos Aires on 12 August, Popham's fleet remained in control of the river and awaiting reinforcements.

As a countermeasure to the blockade, the Cabildo of Buenos Aires agreed with Liniers that all the merchant shipping, national and foreign, should be redeployed from their moorings at Ensenada, Riachuelo and Balizas to the mouth of the Paraná River. The legislative body later decided the internment of all foreign ships, particularly French and American, at the port of Las Conchas, north of San Isidro. The Cabildo also hired sailors to staff Buenos Aires small naval force and employed the services of ship's masters and captains to run the blockade and secure safe passage between Buenos Aires and the Banda Oriental. In the meantime, Liniers granted letters of marque to a number of them to harass the British. One of these privateers was Maltese seaman Juan Bautista Azopardo, commander of the schooner Mosca de Buenos Aires, whose owner was Anselmo Sáenz Valiente, a prominent member of the Cabildo.

Cabildo's countermeasures led to a number of incidents involving British and neutral shipping, such as the capture of the American frigate María and the slave ship Diana by the Mosca de Buenos Aires. On 11 February 1807, the sloop Belén, under the command of Juan Antonio Gutiérrez de la Concha, and assisted by the Mosca de Buenos Aires, seized the British brig Sisters off Ensenada, when the vessel was heading to Buenos Aires in the belief that the city was still in British hands. On 11 March 1807, Belén, the sloop Remedios and five gunboats fought a spirited action with two British brigs off the mouth of Paraná river.

On 1 June 1807, the brig HMS Protector and the gun-brig HMS Staunch spotted the Mosca de Buenos Aires off Martin Chico point. Unable to pursuit the Spanish schooner upriver, the commander of HMS Protector, Lieutenant Street, sent HMS Staunch's gig and a HMS Protector's cutter to hunt the privateer. The boats reached Punta Gorda, where they found Azopardo's vessel escorting a seven sails convoy. The British version is that the boats captured an abandoned schooner in ballast while under fire from the Mosca de Buenos Aires and withdrew. The Spanish convoy, made up of schooners and sloops, had apparently landed on the Banda Oriental a detachment of Spanish marines and Patricians infantry from Buenos Aires. Azopardo's version only agrees with Street's report on the British failure to capture the Mosca de Buenos Aires; Azopardo claims that he not only repelled the boat attack, but also states that the battle involved four enemy small vessels and that his men captured one of them, with one British officer and five ratings aboard. Azopardo acknowledged three casualties among his crew.

== Action ==
The following day in the afternoon Lieutenant Street sent Lieutenant G. Douglas on the schooner HMS Dolores, supported by the gig and the cutter, to intercept the enemy shipping, who had been prevented to sail back to Buenos Aires through the Paraná River by unfavourable winds. The Dolores and the boats found two schooners and a felucca sailing to the northwest at 04:00 pm. At evening, the Spanish flotilla was grounded by their crews two miles from Punta Gorda. The sailors disembarked and camped. The British meanwhile dropped anchor and made preparations to face a night attack, while the boats were sent to scout upriver. At 03:00 am one schooner and a felucca were spotted in the moonlight sailing head on to Dolores starboard.

These were, according to Spanish and Argentine sources, the privateer sloop Mercedes, captained by Francisco de Castro, and the felucca San Antonio, under the command of Second Lieutenant Francisco Pareja. Francisco de Castro, a skipper and trader from Montevideo and a veteran of the 1806 campaign against the British, had offered his services to the Cabildo of Buenos Aires in March. The mission of the Spanish vessels was to keep the supply line to Buenos Aires through the Paraná Guazú River open. Douglas ordered his men to crew the guns and issued small arms. The schooner -actually the sloop Mercedes- and the British warship trade gun and small arms fire. The Mercedes suddenly change course, and then the felucca San Antonio closed in Dolores from the stern an attempted to grapple and board the British schooner. The Spanish and creole sailors riddled the apparel and sails with round shot and grape, breaking the main topsail and shooting away the foretopsail braces and the bowsprit. Dolores fired back with musketry and pistols at the San Antonio, because the low air draught of the felucca prevented Douglas to bear his main guns. Both Spanish ships were also damaged, and broke contact sailing to the south. San Antonio' s commander Francisco Pareja died of wounds, and other eight men were injured. Dolores had two wounded, and the heavy damaged rigging left her powerless to resume the pursuit. Douglas dropped anchor to prevent drifting towards a sandbar and at dawn, after spotting the Spanish sailing the Paraná river for Buenos Aires, ordered the two boats to chase them, but these were eventually outrun.

== Aftermath ==
Despite the continuing naval blockade, the Cabildo of Buenos Aires was able to establish a network of privateers and spies to gather intelligence on the British forces in the Banda Oriental, as well as to secure supply and communications between Buenos Aires and the settlements along the Paraná and Uruguay rivers. This freedom of movement backfired in the form of smuggling, an issue of concern for the authorities given the Spanish monopoly system.

After being routed by Denis Pack forces on 7 June 1807 at San Pedro, near Colonia, some 400 milicias under the command of Javier de Elio, including several companies of Patricians, managed to cross the river back and return to Buenos Aires, in time to prepare the defense of the city.

The British eventually launched a combined, massive assault on Buenos Aires on 3 July 1807 that ended in a heavy defeat for Whitelocke's troops on 5 July. The British generals eventually agreed with Liniers to withdraw from Montevideo and the River Plate in two months. They finally evacuated Montevideo on 9 September 1807.
