= José Bandini =

Spanish sea captain and early settler of San Diego, California (1771–1841)

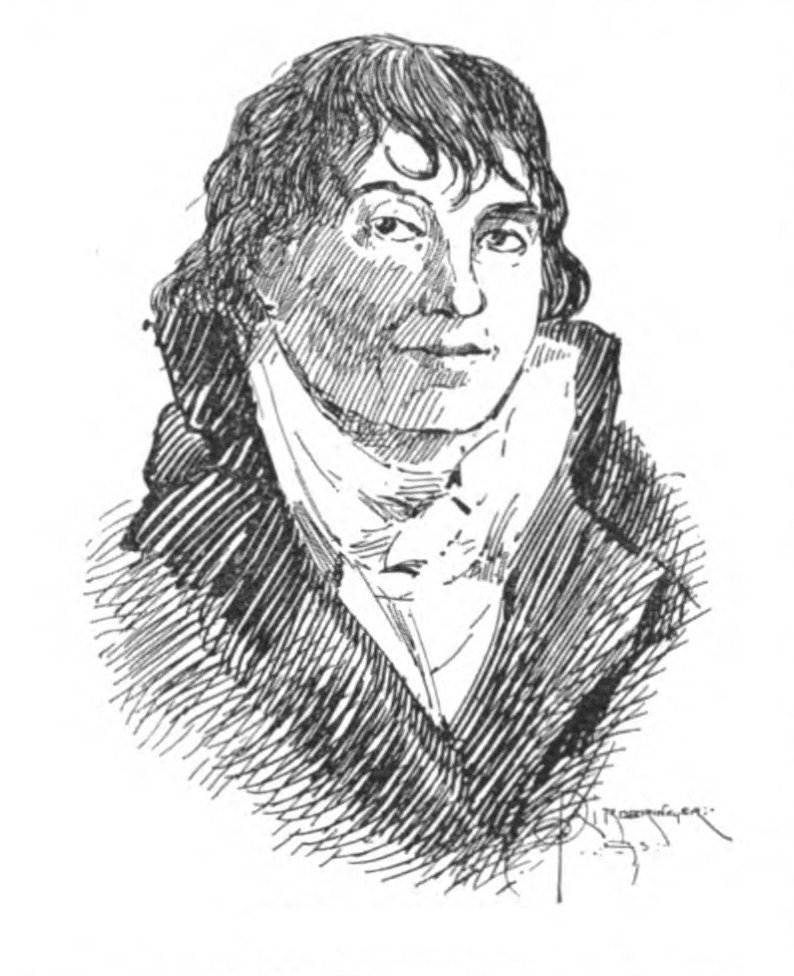
- Born: 1771; Cádiz, Spain
- Died: 1841 (aged 69–70); San Diego, California

José Bandini (1771–1841) was a Spanish and Mexican sea captain and early settler of San Diego, California.

== Early life and marriage ==
José Bandini was born in Cádiz, Spain, and most likely had at least some (if not all) broadly Italian ancestors who had emigrated to Spain when most of the country was part of the empire. In 1793 he settled in Lima, Peru, where he married twice, first to Ysidora Blancas and, after her death in 1801, to Manuela Mazuelos. He had several children including Manuel Antonio Bandini Mazuelos who became Archbishop of Lima and Juan Bandini, a well-known political figure in the Mexican and American eras of California.

== Naval service ==
Bandini served as a lieutenant on the Spanish vessel, Nymphia, at the Battle of Trafalgar in 1805.

He first visited California, then part of Spain, in December 1818 as captain of the ship Reina de los Ángeles, bringing military supplies and troops from San Blas to Alta California's capital, Monterey to defend against the corsair, Hippolyte Bouchard. Two years later he and his crew took an oath of allegiance to Mexican revolutionary leader Agustín de Iturbide and took part in the Mexican War of Independence.

== Settlement in California ==
In 1822 Bandini was granted military retirement with the rank, capitán de milicias, by the newly independent Mexican government. Soon afterward he settled in San Diego where, as Richard Henry Dana described in Two Years Before the Mast, "he built a large house with a court-yard in front, kept a great retinue of Indians, and set up for the grandee of that part of the country."

In 1828 Bandini wrote Descrision de l'Alta California (translated to English by Doris Marion Wright as A Description of California in 1828). In it he described the territory's people, its land and resources, and the state of its commerce. At the time the Mexican government had decided that foreign trade with California would only be allowed through the port of Monterey. Bandini believed this would stifle California's economic growth so he concluded the Descrision by proposing that imports also be allowed at the port of San Diego while California's exports (almost entirely hides, tallow, and wheat) be allowed anywhere along its coast.

His son, Juan Bandini, used the Descrision as the basis of a report he wrote for the Comisaría Principal de la Alta California in 1830.

José Bandini died in San Diego in 1841.
