= Peter Corney (explorer) =

- Died: 31 August 1835; English Channel, Atlantic Ocean
- Occupations: Sailor, explorer

Peter Corney (18th century – 31 August 1835) was an English sailor and explorer. A veteran of many Pacific crossings, he is probably best known for his work Voyages in the Northern Pacific; Narrative of Several Trading Voyages from 1813 to 1818... He also gained a note of notoriety from his 1818 exploits as captain of the Argentinian sailing vessel Santa Rosa while in the employ of French privateer Hippolyte de Bouchard.

Corney died on 31 August 1835 in the company of his family while traversing the English Channel.
