= Spanish American wars of independence =

1808–1833 series of armed conflicts in the Americas

- Part of the Atlantic Revolutions, and the Age of Revolution
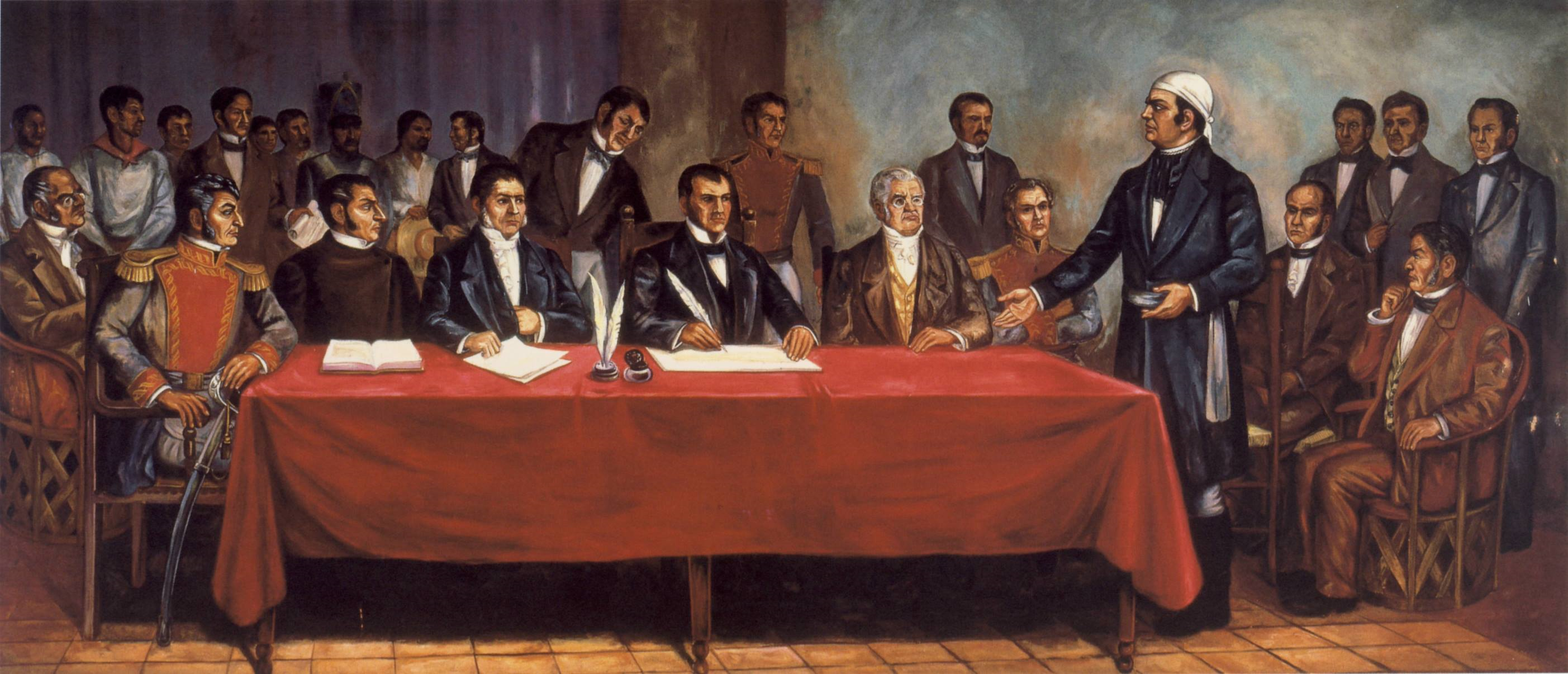
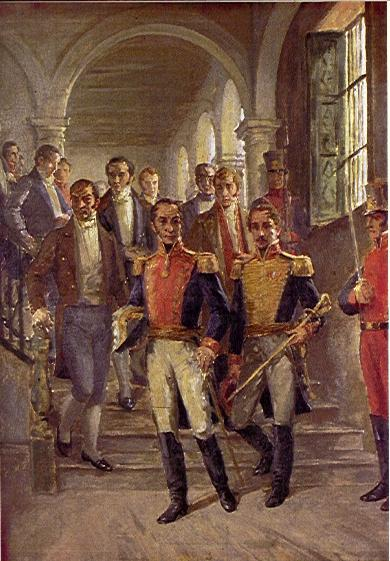
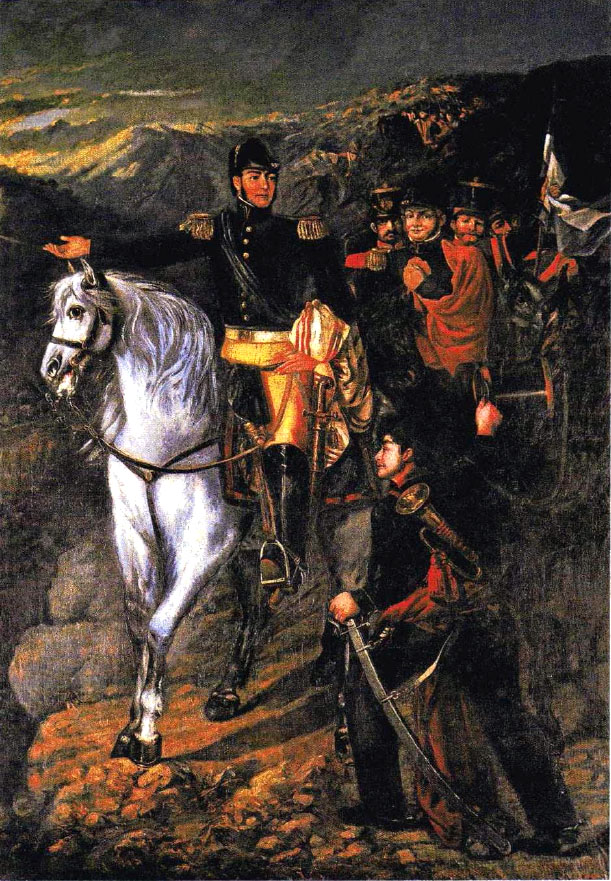
- From left to right, top to bottom: the Congress of Chilpancingo (1813), the Congress of Cúcuta (1821), the Crossing of the Andes (1817), and the extent of the Spanish Empire on the eve of the independence wars, according to the Cortes de Cádiz.
Date	25 September 1808 – 29 September 1833
Location	Spanish Empire (The Americas)
Result	Patriot victory
Territorial changes	Disintegration of Spanish America into independent nation states. List: Bolivia; Chile; Gran Colombia; Venezuela; Colombia; Ecuador; First Mexican Empire; Mexico; Insurgents; Army of the Three Guarantees; Federal Republic of Central America; (Protectorate of Peru) Peru; Maynas; (United Provinces of the Río de la Plata) United Provinces; Paraguay; West Florida (annexed by the United States); Diplomatic recognition in 1821 (Portugal), 1822 (US), and 1825 (UK).; Spain retained the islands of Cuba and Puerto Rico until the Spanish–American War of 1898.; Banda Oriental and Spanish Texas become part of the United Kingdom of Portugal, Brazil and the Algarves and First Mexican Empire respectively.

Participants
Patriot factions; Supported by: United Kingdom (1815–1819); United States (1810–1819); Haiti	Kingdom of Spain and the Indies; Spain; the Indies

Units involved
Army of the Andes; Armed forces of Chile; Armed forces of Gran Colombia; Armed forces of Mexico; Armed forces of Peru; Orientals forces; Republican Army of the North; American Indian allies	Royalist armies by theater; Expeditionary forces; Spanish Navy; American Indian allies

Strength
130,000 Patriots; 6,500 British volunteers; 3,000 Americans sailors (100 vessels)	Royalists: Unknown; Spain: 30,000 (total deployment)

Casualties and losses
Unknown	150,000 royalists killed
- 1,000,000 total dead; 600,000 in New Spain; 400,000 in New Granada
- Napoleonic Spain (1808–1813) preserved the integrity of the Spanish Empire.

The Spanish American wars of independence (Spanish: Guerras de independencia hispanoamericanas) were a series of early 19th-century conflicts across the Spanish Empire that resulted in new independent nation states in the Americas. They began shortly after the outbreak of the Peninsular War, part of the broader Napoleonic Wars.

The process unfolded in two main phases. First, the Spanish Crown broke up, beginning in Spain in 1808 with the French invasion, the Spanish uprising against the Bonapartes, the vacancy of the throne, and the emergence of juntas later replicated in America. This unfolded as it did because sovereignty reverted vertically, from the Crown down to the cabildos (town councils, or ayuntamientos), the monarchy's basic cellular units. Second, beginning in 1810, attempts at reconstruction failed and developed into wars in their own right: the Cortes of Cádiz sought a pan-Hispanic state, King Ferdinand VII sought to recover the Spanish Crown he had ceded to Napoleon Bonaparte, and in the Americas Simón Bolívar, Agustín de Iturbide and others tried to build large states, such as the Federation of the Andes or the First Mexican Empire. Strictly in terms of military campaigns, they ran from sporadic clashes such as the battle at Chacaltaya in 1809 (present-day Bolivia) to the Battle of Tampico in 1829 (present-day Mexico). The result was the fragmentation of the Hispanic world into multiple states that largely reconstituted the old Spanish administrative boundaries under uti possidetis.

The conflicts were multilateral, involving many factions traditionally grouped into two broad camps: Royalists, who favored continued rule by the Monarchy of Spain, and Patriots, who supported independent monarchies or republics, either united or separate from one another. They were fought as both irregular warfare and conventional warfare. Some historians argue that they began as localized civil wars that spread as secessionist wars for general independence. Under a typology based on whether or not the belligerents constitute a State, they were mixed wars, combining elements of civil wars between political factions, wars between states, and wars between empires. The independence of most of Spanish America produced new national boundaries that followed the colonial provinces and formed the basis of contemporary Hispanic America.

The Spanish Empire dissolved in the region and new states emerged. The new republics abandoned the Inquisition and noble titles, but slavery was not immediately abolished, and total abolition came only in the 1850s in most countries. Criollos and mestizos replaced Spanish-born officials in most political offices, and Criollos stayed at the top of a social structure that kept traditional features culturally, if not legally. For almost a century, conservatives and liberals fought to reverse or deepen these changes. Spaniards were also subject to forced displacement, during the war and later through expulsion laws meant to consolidate independence.

The wars followed the Haitian Revolution (1791–1804) and unfolded alongside Brazil's own path to independence. Spanish America and Brazil shared a trigger: Napoleon's invasion of Iberia, which in 1807 forced the Portuguese royal family to flee to Brazil. More broadly, they drew on Enlightenment ideas of popular sovereignty behind the Atlantic Revolutions. The more direct cause was the crisis within Spain, which resulted in new independent states in the post-Napoleonic world. Cuba and Puerto Rico remained under Spanish rule until the 1898 Spanish–American War. Under Monroe Doctrine, this reconfiguration culminated in the modern states of Latin America. More recently, decolonial currents have proposed reorganizing Latin American states into Abya Yala, a plurinational project criticized as Balkanization.

== Historical context ==
Development of Spanish American Independence Government under traditional Spanish law Loyal to Supreme Central Junta or Cortes American junta or insurrection movement Independent state declared or established Height of French control of the Peninsula

Political independence was not necessarily the foreordained outcome of the political turmoil in Spanish America. "There was little interest in outright independence." As historians R.A. Humphreys and John Lynch note, "it is all too easy to equate the forces of discontent or even the forces of change with the forces of revolution." Since "by definition, there was no history of independence until it happened," when Spanish American independence did occur, explanations for why it came about have been sought. The Spanish American Wars of Independence were essentially a power vacuum in the Spanish monarchy that resulting in a rupture that gave rise to new states.

=== Proposals for a controlled independence ===
A number of proposals to grant independence to parts of the Spanish Empire had been made over the centuries, the first of them going back to the conquest of the Aztec Empire in the 16th century, with Toribio de Benavente suggesting King of Spain and Holy Roman Emperor Charles V to place a Spanish prince at the head of New Spain. The idea strengthened in the 18th century after Spain's participation in the American Revolutionary War, with the goal of preventing the Spanish overseas territories from developing sentiments of independence in the example of the United States. Ministers José Ábalos and the Count of Aranda presented King Charles III with ideas of turning the empire into a confederacy of monarchies under the Spanish House of Bourbon. However, while not rejecting them, Charles did not act upon them either. A similar idea was presented in the 18th century by Secretary of State Manuel Godoy to Charles IV, which was found unrealizable at the time.

=== Administrative and economic reforms ===
New Spain in 1794, with its province of New Philippines to its northeast, in light orange, west of Spanish Louisiana, in purple

There are a number of factors that have been identified to have provoked the independent movements. First, increasing control by the Crown of its overseas empire via the Bourbon Reforms of the mid-eighteenth century introduced changes to the relationship of Spanish Americans to the Crown. The language used to describe the overseas empire shifted from "kingdoms" with independent standing with the crown to "colonies" subordinate to Spain. In an effort to better control the administration and economy of the overseas possessions the Crown reintroduced the practice of appointing outsiders, almost all peninsulars, to the royal offices throughout the empire. This meant that Spanish American elites were thwarted in their expectations and ambitions by the crown's upending of long-standing practices of creole access to office holding.

The regalist and secularizing policies of the Bourbon monarchy were aimed at decreasing the power of the Roman Catholic Church. The crown had already expelled the Jesuits in 1767, which saw many creole members of the Society of Jesus go into permanent exile. By limiting the power of the Church, the crown attempted to centralize itself within the institutions of colonial Spanish America. Because of the physical and ideological proximity that the clergy had, they could directly influence and dictate the interactions between populations of colonial Spanish America, either as legal counsel or an advisor; a directness which the crown would need to attempt to create the centralized, colonial state which it wanted to implement.

Later in the eighteenth century the crown sought to decrease the privileges (fueros) of the clergy, restricting clerical authority to spiritual matters and undermining the power of parish priests, who often acted as agents of the crown in rural parishes. By desacralizing power and frontal attacks on the clergy, the crown, according to William B. Taylor, undermined its own legitimacy, since parish priests had been traditionally the "natural local representatives of their Catholic king."

In the economic sphere, the crown sought to gain control over church revenues. The Church functioned as one of the largest economic institutions within colonial Spanish America. It owned and retained jurisdiction over large amounts of land, which the crown wanted for itself because of the economic value which could be derived from the land. Moreover, by taking that land for itself, the Crown had the opportunity to cut down the physical presence of the Church to further weaken its ideological and social role within local colonial communities.

In a financial crisis of 1804, the crown attempted to call in debts owed the church, mainly in the form of mortgages for haciendas owned by the elites. The Act of Consolidation simultaneously threatened the wealth of the church, whose capital was mainly lent for mortgages, as well as threatening the financial well-being of elites, who depended on mortgages for acquiring and keeping their estates. Shortening the repayment period meant many elites were faced with bankruptcy. The crown also sought to gain access to benefices elite families set aside to support a priest, often their own family members, by eliminating these endowed funds (capellanías) that the lower clergy depended on disproportionately. Prominently in Mexico, lower clergy participated in the insurgency for independence with priests Miguel Hidalgo and José María Morelos.

The reforms had mixed results. In some areas—such as Cuba, Río de la Plata and New Spain—the reforms had positive effects, improving the local economy and the efficiency of the government. In other areas, the changes in the crown's economic and administrative policies led to tensions with locals, which at times erupted into open revolts, such as the Revolt of the Comuneros in New Granada and the Rebellion of Túpac Amaru II in Peru.

The loss of high offices to peninsulars and the eighteenth-century revolts in Spanish South America were some of the direct causes of the wars of independence, which took place decades later, but they have been considered important elements of the political background in which the wars took place. Many Creoles, particularly the wealthy Creoles, were negatively impacted by the Bourbon Reforms. This resulted in their taking action by using their wealth and positions within society, often as leaders within their communities, to spur resistance to convey their displeasure with Spanish reforms because of the negative economic impact which they had. However, because of how quickly their revolts would further radicalize the lower classes, the Creoles quickly stopped supporting general violent insurrection because they benefitted from social change that occurred through the systems of the Spanish crown. Institutional change ensured stability by supporting the political institutions that allowed for the creation of a wealthy Creole class and further adapting those institutions to meet demands, rather than propose a radical shift in the complete make-up of socioeconomic life and traditions. However, institutional change did not come as anticipated and further spurred on the radicalization of Spanish-American social classes towards independence.

=== Military restructuring ===
Spain's international wars in the second half of the 18th century evidenced the empire's difficulties in reinforcing its colonial possessions and provide them with economic aid. This led to an increased local participation in the financing of the defense and an increased participation in the militias by the locally-born. Such development was at odds with the ideals of the centralized absolute monarchy. The Spanish did also formal concessions to strengthen the defense: In Chiloé Archipelago Spanish authorities promised freedom from the encomienda to those indigenous locals who settled near the new stronghold of Ancud (founded in 1768) and contributed to its defense. The increased local organization of the defenses would ultimately undermine metropolitan authority and bolster the independence movement.

=== Spread of Enlightenment ideals ===
Other factors may include Enlightenment thinking and the examples of the Atlantic Revolutions. The Enlightenment spurred the desire for social and economic reform to spread throughout Spanish America and the Iberian Peninsula. Ideas about free trade and physiocratic economics were raised by the Enlightenment in Spain and spread to the overseas empire and a homegrown Spanish American Enlightenment. The political reforms implemented and the many constitutions written both in Spain and throughout the Spanish world during the wars of independence were influenced by these factors.

== Breakup of the Spanish Monarchy (1808–1810) ==
=== Effects of the Napoleonic Wars ===
In 1808, Napoleon Bonaparte, as part of his Continental Blockade strategy against the British Empire, forced the Spanish royal family to abdicate the throne, imposed the Bayonne Statute, and installed his brother, Joseph Bonaparte, as King of Spain. In the 18th century, the Habsburg dynasty was replaced by the Bourbons, and the Spanish Empire declined from a global power to a second-rate power following the War of the Spanish Succession, but continued to be an important colonial power due to its possessions in the Americas. Similarly, the replacement of the Bourbons with the Bonaparte dynasty aimed to preserve the empire's integrity.

Napoleon showed an interest in retaining the American viceroyalties even before placing Joseph I on the Spanish throne in 1808, attracted by their resources and commercial potential. His policy towards Spanish America initially took shape through two simultaneous initiatives: the dispatch of commissioners to the viceroyalties and the summoning of American representatives to the Assembly of Bayonne. However, Napoleonic Spain (1808–1813) was ultimately defeated in the Peninsular War. The rejection of this new dynasty created a power vacuum and led to the emergence of liberalism and a desire for liberties throughout the Spanish Empire.

=== Collapse of the Bourbon dynasty ===
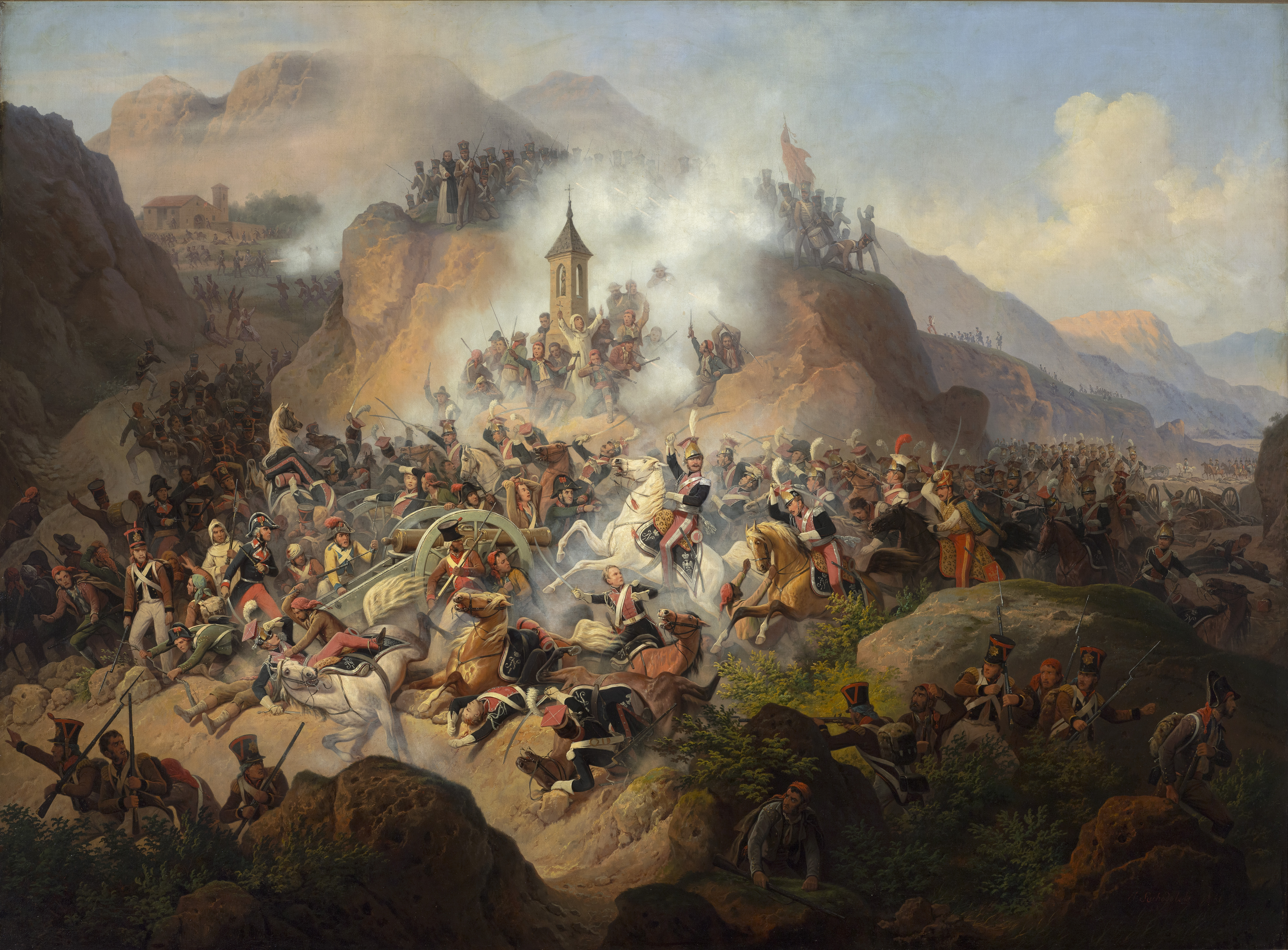
Spanish regular and irregular forces fighting in the Somosierra Pass against a French invading army

The Peninsular War was the trigger for conflicts in Spanish America in the absence of a legitimate monarch. The Peninsular War began an extended period of instability in the worldwide Spanish monarchy that lasted until 1823. Napoleon forced the Bourbon monarchs to abdicate, which precipitated a political crisis in Spain and Spanish America. Although the Spanish world almost uniformly rejected Napoleon's plan to place his brother, Joseph, on the throne, there was no clear solution to the lack of a king. Following traditional Spanish political theories on the contractual nature of the monarchy (see Philosophy of Law of Francisco Suárez), the peninsular provinces responded to the crisis by establishing juntas. The move, however, led to more confusion, since there was no central authority and most juntas did not recognize the claim of some juntas to represent the monarchy as a whole. The Junta of Seville, in particular, claimed authority over the overseas empire, because of the province's historic role as the exclusive entrepôt of the empire.

This impasse was resolved through negotiations between the several juntas in Spain counted with the participation of the Council of Castile, which led to the creation of a main government: the "Supreme Central and Governmental Junta of Spain and the Indies" on 25 September 1808. It was agreed that the kingdoms of the peninsula would send two representatives to this Supreme Central Junta, and that the overseas kingdoms would send one representative each. These kingdoms were defined as "the viceroyalties of New Spain (Mexico), Peru, New Granada, and Buenos Aires, and the independent captaincies general of the island of Cuba, Puerto Rico, Guatemala, Chile, Province of Venezuela, and the Philippines." This plan was criticized for providing unequal representation to Spanish America; nevertheless, throughout the end of 1808 and early 1809, the regional capitals elected candidates, whose names were forwarded to the capitals of the viceroyalties or captaincies general. Several important and large cities were left without direct representation in the Supreme Junta. In particular Quito and Chuquisaca, which saw themselves as the capitals of kingdoms, resented being subsumed in the larger Viceroyalty of Peru and Viceroyalty of the Río de la Plata respectively. This unrest led to the establishment of juntas in these cities in 1809, which were eventually quashed by the authorities within the year. An unsuccessful attempt at establishing a junta in New Spain was also stopped.

=== Response in Spanish America ===
At first, some major cities or capitals formed local Juntas on the basis of laws from the Hispanic tradition. The armed conflicts started in 1809, with short-lived juntas established to govern in Chuquisaca, La Paz and Quito opposing the government of the Supreme Central Junta of Seville. Although various regions objected to many crown policies, "there was little interest in outright independence; indeed there was widespread support for the Spanish Central Junta formed to lead the resistance against the French". While some Spanish Americans believed that independence was necessary, most who initially supported the creation of the new governments saw them as a means to preserve the region's autonomy from the French. Although there had been research on the idea of a separate Spanish American ("creole") identity separate from that of Iberia, political independence was not initially the aim of most Spanish Americans, nor was it necessarily inevitable.

French forces had taken over southern Spain and forced the Supreme Junta to seek refuge in the island-city of Cádiz. The escape to Cádiz and the dissolution of the Supreme Central Junta on 29 January 1810, because of the reverses suffered after the Battle of Ocaña by the Spanish forces paid with Spanish American money, set off another wave of juntas being established in the Americas. These juntas gained their own levels of independence and autonomy from Spain through declarations in 1808–1810.

Most Spanish Americans saw no reason to recognize a rump government that was under the threat of being captured by the French at any moment, and began to work for the creation of local juntas to preserve the region's independence from the French. Junta movements were successful in New Granada (Colombia), Venezuela, Chile and Río de la Plata (Argentina). Less successful, though serious movements, also occurred in Central America. Ultimately, Central America, along with most of New Spain, Quito (Ecuador), Peru, Upper Peru (Bolivia), the Caribbean and the Philippine Islands remained under control of royalists for the next decade and participated in the Cortes of Cádiz efforts to establish a liberal government for the Spanish monarchy.

== Course of the Wars of Independence (1810-1833) ==
Irreconcilable visions of how to reconstitute the lost unity led to a war that spread across the entire continent. At the end of 1810, the captive Ferdinand VII of Spain was recognized as a king subordinate to popular sovereignty by the Cortes of Cádiz and by several of the governing juntas, each in the territories under its control. The governing juntas across America wanted to reinstate Ferdinand VII as king subordinate and refused to accept the authority of the Council of Regency that was established with the dissolution of the Supreme and Central Governmental Junta of Spain and the Indies. In agreement on this, a military conflict arose between Royalists and Patriots over the unity or independence of the empire.

In 1814 following the defeat of Napoleon and the restoration of the throne by the Treaty of Valençay, Ferdinand VII reimposed absolute monarchy through a coup d'état. He was able to defeat and repress the peninsular liberals, and abolished the liberal Constitution of Cadiz, although he could not defeat the revolutionaries in Spanish America, who resisted and formed their own national congresses. The Spanish navy had collapsed in the war against Napoleon, so therefore, in practice, it did not support the expeditionary forces who arrived in small groups.

In 1820 Rafael del Riego led the Spanish army in revolt against absolutism, which began a period of Liberal rule known as the Trienio Liberal and ended the threat of invasion against the Río de la Plata. As a result, the royalist cause began to collapse in the Americas. Over the course of the next decade, the Patriots' armies won major victories and obtained independence in their respective countries. Spain did not change the position against separatism, but the political instability in Spain, without a navy, army or treasury, convinced many Spanish Americans of the need to formally establish independence from the metropole. In Spain, a French army of the Holy Alliance invaded and supported the absolutists, restored Ferdinand VII, and occupied Spain until 1828.

Ideas regarding the unity of the Spanish Empire
	Centralist	Pluralist
Monarchism	Kingdom of Spain and the Indies; Bonapartists; Bourbons	Autonomous kingdoms Habsburgs; Government Juntas
Liberalism	Kingdom of the Spains; Cortes of Cádiz and Trienio Liberal	Independent republics Founding Congresses in Hispanic America

=== The Spanish Liberal Revolution ===
Deputies of Cortes of Cádiz by territories of the Provincial deputation in Spanish America

The Supreme Central Junta was defeated and dissolved itself giving way to a five-member council known as the Regency, or the Council of Regency of Spain and the Indies. Next, to establish a more legitimate government system, the Regency called for the convening of an "extraordinary and general Cortes of the Spanish Nation": which was convened as the Cortes of Cádiz. At the beginning of 1810, new juntas appeared across Spanish America when the Central Junta fell to the French invasion.

The Cortes of Cádiz was the first national assembly to claim sovereignty in Spain. It represented the abolition of the old kingdoms. The opening session was held on 24 September 1810, in the building now known as the Real Teatro de las Cortes under the siege of French army. It met as one body and its members represented the entire Spanish empire. The plan for the election of the Cortes, based on provinces, and not kingdoms, was more equitable and provided more time to determine what would be considered an overseas province.

Name	Start	End	Governing body	Events	Monarch
Kingdom of Spain and the Indies (Royaume d'Espagne et des Indes)	1808	1814	Napoleonic Spain; Joachim Murat and Supreme Junta of government (1808)	French military occupation; Abdications of Bayonne; Bayonne Constitution	Joseph Bonaparte (French military occupation until 1813)
Kingdom of Spain and the Indies or the Spains (Liberalism)	1808	1814	Supreme Central Junta; Cortes of Cádiz	Apodaca–Canning treaty; Peninsular War; Spanish Constitution of 1812	Junta or Regency (absence of the king)
Kingdom of Spain and the Indies	1814	1819	Absolutist Six-Year Period	Treaty of Valençay; May 1814 Ferdinand's Coup d'état	Ferdinand VII of Spain
Kingdom of Spain and the Indies or the Spains (Liberalism)	1820	1822	Trienio Liberal	Rafael del Riego Coup d'état	Regency (Ferdinand VII subordinated)
Kingdom of Spain and the Indies	1823	1833	Ominous Decade	Hundred Thousand Sons of Saint Louis; Royalist War	Ferdinand VII of Spain (French military occupation until 1827)

=== Civil wars for disputed sovereignty, 1810–1814 ===
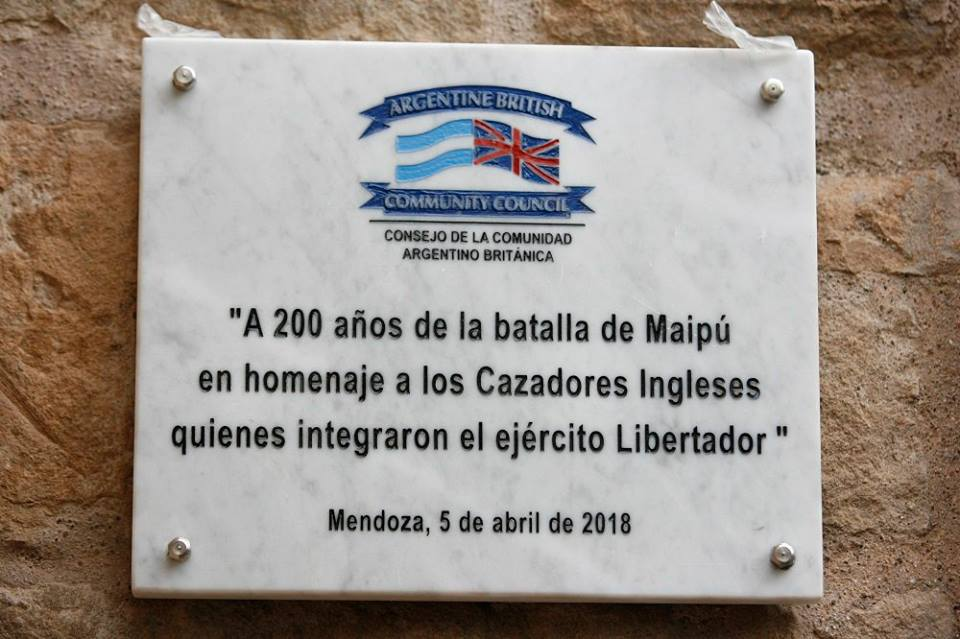
Plaque remembering the help of British hunters in the Battle of Maipú, in Mendoza

Winning Spanish American independence also involved civil war. The creation of juntas in Spanish America, such as the Junta Suprema de Caracas on 19 April 1810, set the stage for the fighting that would afflict the region for the next decade and a half. Political fault lines appeared, and were often the causes of military conflict. On the one hand the juntas challenged the authority of all royal officials, whether they recognized the Regency or not. On the other hand, royal officials and Spanish Americans who desired to keep the empire together were split between liberals, who supported the efforts of the Cortes, and conservatives (often called "absolutists" in the historiography), who did not want to see any innovations in government. Finally, although the juntas claimed to carry out their actions in the name of the deposed king, Ferdinand VII, their creation provided an opportunity for people who favored outright independence to promote their agenda publicly and safely. The proponents of independence called themselves Patriots, a term which eventually was generally applied to them.

The idea that independence was not the initial concern is evidenced by the fact that few areas declared independence in the years after 1810. The congresses of Venezuela and New Granada did so in 1811 and also Paraguay in the same year (14 and 15 May 1811). Some historians explain the reluctance to declare independence as a "mask of Ferdinand VII": that is, that Patriot leaders felt they needed to claim loyalty to the deposed monarch to prepare the masses for the radical change that full independence would eventually entail. Nevertheless, even areas such as Río de la Plata and Chile, which more or less maintained de facto independence from the peninsular authorities, did not declare independence until quite a few years later, in 1816 and 1818, respectively. Overall, despite achieving formal or de facto independence, many regions of Spanish America were marked by nearly continuous wars, which lasted well into the 1820s. In Mexico, where the junta movement had been stopped in its early stages by a coalition of peninsular merchants and government officials, efforts to establish a government independent of the Regency or the French took the form of rebellion, under the leadership of Miguel Hidalgo. Hidalgo was captured and executed in 1811, but a resistance movement continued, which declared independence from Spain in 1813. The Gutiérrez–Magee Expedition was a joint Tejanos-US volunteers expedition formed in Louisiana for Texas independence but was defeated in the Battle of Medina. In Central America, attempts at establishing juntas were also put down, but resulted in significantly less violence. The Caribbean islands, like the Philippines on the other side of the world, were relatively peaceful. Any plots to set up juntas were denounced to the authorities early enough to stop them before they gained widespread support.

==== Raising Armies ====
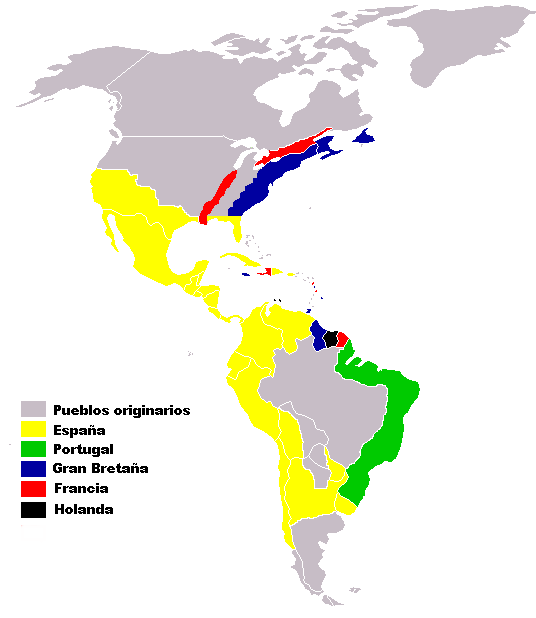
European colonies in the Americas in the 16th–18th century

The recruitment of soldiers seemed to end up as a common pool employed by opposing sides as cannon fodder. Socially, both apparently opposing positions, loyalist and pro-independence, had an uncertain significance for the different social strata of the monarchy. In Europe, the Spaniards made a forced recruitment for the expeditionary forces, leading to constant rebellions. Independent states relied on privateers, mercenaries, volunteers, adventurers, or filibusters, reliable fighters when pay or booty was at a glance. For the mobilization of the population in the Americas, the vast majority or almost all of the troops of both sides, the indiscriminate recruitment of native American communities was used, in general in traditional confronted regions; social improvements were promised, by both sides, to the indigenous and the different mestizo colonial castes, such as mulattoes ("pardos"), cholos, etc., and even African slaves were recruited by both sides. All those recruited in the Americas, and also the Spaniards, joined the enemy armies as combatants when they were captured. Likewise, the Creole potentates of European origin could give their support to the royalist or pro-independence cause, in relation to the commercial interests of each region. The Church was also divided, and except for the lower clergy, who were involved as combatants of insurgency, their position was in accordance with the political power.

==== Major cities and regional rivalries ====
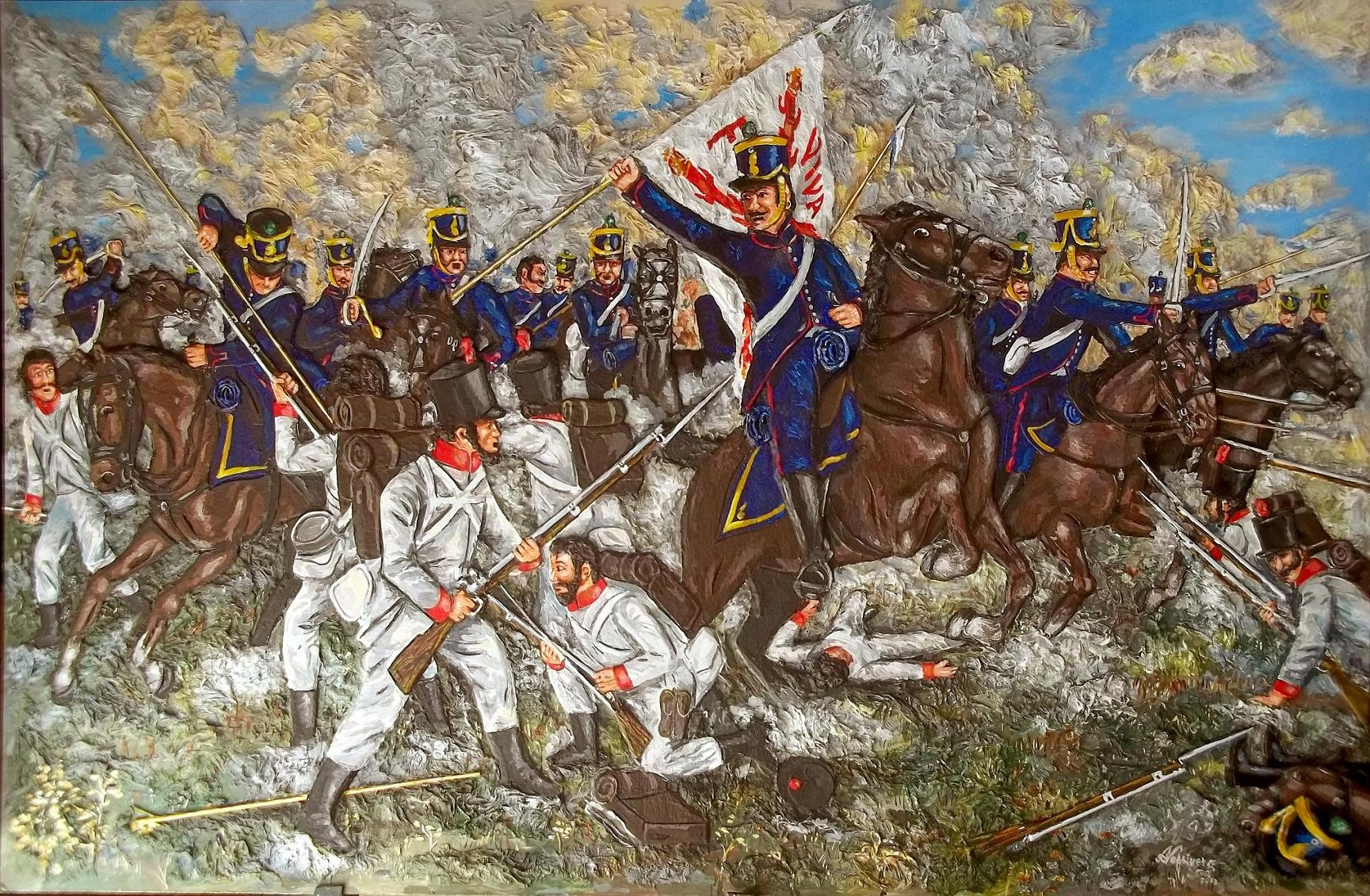
The Battle of San Lorenzo in 1813

Major cities and regional rivalry played an important role in the wars. The disappearance of a central, imperial authority—and in some cases of even a local, viceregal authority (as in the cases of New Granada and Río de la Plata)—initiated a prolonged period of balkanization in many regions of Spanish America. It was not clear which political units should replace the empire, and there were no new national identities to replace the traditional sense of being Spaniards. The original juntas of 1810 appealed first to a sense of being Spanish, which was counterposed to the French threat; second, to a general American identity, which was counterposed to the Peninsula lost to the French; and third, to a sense of belonging to the major cities or local province, the patria in Spanish. More often than not, juntas sought to maintain a province's independence from the capital of the former viceroyalty or captaincy general as much as from the Peninsula itself. Armed conflicts broke out between the provinces over the question of whether some cities or provinces were to be subordinate to others as they had been under the crown. This phenomenon was particularly evident in South America. This rivalry also led some regions to adopt the opposite political cause to that chosen by their rivals. Peru seems to have remained strongly royalist in large part because of its rivalry with Río de la Plata, to which it had lost control of Upper Peru when the latter was elevated to a viceroyalty in 1776. The creation of juntas in Río de la Plata allowed Peru to regain formal control of Upper Peru for the duration of the wars.

==== Social and racial tensions ====
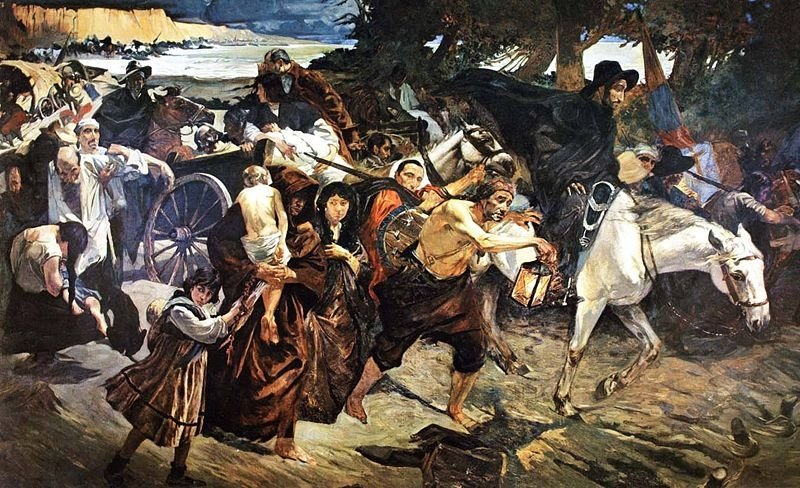
Exodus from the town of Caracas 1814

Underlying social and racial tensions also had a great impact on the nature of the fighting. Rural areas were pitted against urban centers, as grievances against the authorities found an outlet in the political conflict. This was the case with Hidalgo's peasant revolt, which was fueled as much by discontent over several years of bad harvests as with events in the Peninsular War. Hidalgo was originally part of a circle of liberal urbanites in Querétaro, who sought to establish a junta. After this conspiracy was discovered, Hidalgo turned to the rural people of the Mexican Bajío to build his army, and their interests soon overshadowed those of the urban intellectuals. A similar tension existed in Venezuela, where the Spanish immigrant José Tomás Boves formed a powerful, though irregular, royalist army out of the Llaneros, mixed-race slave and plains people, by attacking the white landowning class. Boves and his followers often disregarded the command of Spanish officials and were not concerned with actually re-establishing the toppled royal government, choosing instead to keep real power among themselves. Finally, in the back country of Upper Peru, the republiquetas kept the idea of independence alive by allying with disenfranchised members of rural society and native groups, but were never able to take the major population centers.

Increasingly violent confrontations developed between Spaniards and Spanish Americans, but this tension was often related to class issues or fomented by Patriot leaders to create a new sense of nationalism. After being incited to rid the country of the gachupines (a disparaging term for Peninsulares), Hidalgo's forces indiscriminately massacred hundreds of Criollos and Peninsulares who had taken refuge at the Alhóndiga de Granaditas in Guanajuato. In Venezuela during his Admirable Campaign, Simón Bolívar instituted a policy of a war to the death, in which royalist Spanish Americans would be purposely spared but even neutral Peninsulares would be killed, to drive a wedge between the two groups. This policy laid the ground for the violent royalist reaction under Boves. Often though, royalism or patriotism simply provided a banner to organize the aggrieved, and the political causes could be discarded just as quickly as they were picked up. The Venezuelan Llaneros switched to the Patriot banner once the elites and the urban centers became securely royalist after 1815, and it was the royal army in Mexico that ultimately brought about that nation's independence.

=== King's war against independence, 1814–1820 ===
At the first years of war, during Spanish constitutional period, the main military effort of Spain was aimed at preserving the island of Cuba and the viceroyalty of Mexico in North America. But in 1814, with the restoration of Ferdinand VII, the strategic line of the war changed drastically, directing the major Spanish military effort towards South America. By 1815 the general outlines of which areas were controlled by royalists and pro-independence forces were established and a general stalemate set in the war. In areas where royalists controlled the main population centers, most of the fighting by those seeking independence was done by isolated guerrilla bands. In New Spain, the two main guerrilla groups were led by Guadalupe Victoria in Puebla and Vicente Guerrero in Oaxaca. In northern South America, New Granadan and Venezuelan Patriots, under leaders such as Simón Bolívar, Francisco de Paula Santander, Santiago Mariño, Manuel Piar and José Antonio Páez, carried out campaigns in the vast Orinoco River basin and along the Caribbean coast, often with material aid coming from Curaçao and Haiti. Also, as mentioned above, in Upper Peru, guerrilla bands controlled the isolated, rural parts of the country.

==== Restoration of Ferdinand VII ====
In March 1814, following the collapse of the First French Empire, Ferdinand VII was restored to the Spanish throne. This signified an important change, since most of the political and legal changes made on both sides of the Atlantic—the myriad of juntas, the Cortes in Spain and several of the congresses in the Americas, and many of the constitutions and new legal codes—had been made in his name. Before entering Spanish territory, Ferdinand made loose promises to the Cortes that he would uphold the Spanish Constitution. But once in Spain he realized that he had significant support from conservatives in the general population and the hierarchy of the Spanish Catholic Church; so, on 4 May, he repudiated the Constitution and ordered the arrest of liberal leaders on 10 May. Ferdinand justified his actions by stating that the Constitution and other changes had been made by a Cortes assembled in his absence and without his consent. He restored the former legal codes and political institutions and promised to convene a new Cortes under its traditional form (with separate chambers for the clergy and the nobility), a promise never fulfilled. News of the events arrived through Spanish America during the next three weeks to nine months, depending on time it took goods and people to travel from Spain.

Ferdinand's actions constituted a definitive de facto break both with the autonomous governments, which had not yet declared formal independence, and with the effort of Spanish liberals to create a representative government that would fully include the overseas possessions. Such a government was seen as an alternative to independence by many in New Spain, Central America, the Caribbean, Quito, Peru, Upper Peru and Chile. Yet the news of the restoration of the "Ancien Régime" did not initiate a new wave of juntas, as had happened in 1809 and 1810, with the notable exception of the establishment of a junta in Cuzco demanding the implementation of the Spanish Constitution. Instead most Spanish Americans were moderates who decided to wait and see what would come out of the restoration of normalcy. In fact, in areas of New Spain, Central America and Quito, governors found it expedient to leave the elected constitutional ayuntamientos in place for several years to prevent conflict with the local society. Liberals on both sides of the Atlantic, nevertheless, continued to conspire to bring back a constitutional monarchy, ultimately succeeding in 1820. The most dramatic example of transatlantic collaboration is perhaps Francisco Javier Mina's expedition to Texas and northern Mexico in 1816 and 1817.

Spanish Americans in royalist areas who were committed to independence had already joined the guerrilla movements. However, Ferdinand's actions did set areas outside of the control of the crown on the path to full independence. The governments of these regions, which had their origins in the juntas of 1810, and even moderates there, who had entertained a reconciliation with the crown, now saw the need to separate from Spain if they were to protect the reforms they had enacted.

==== Royalist military ====
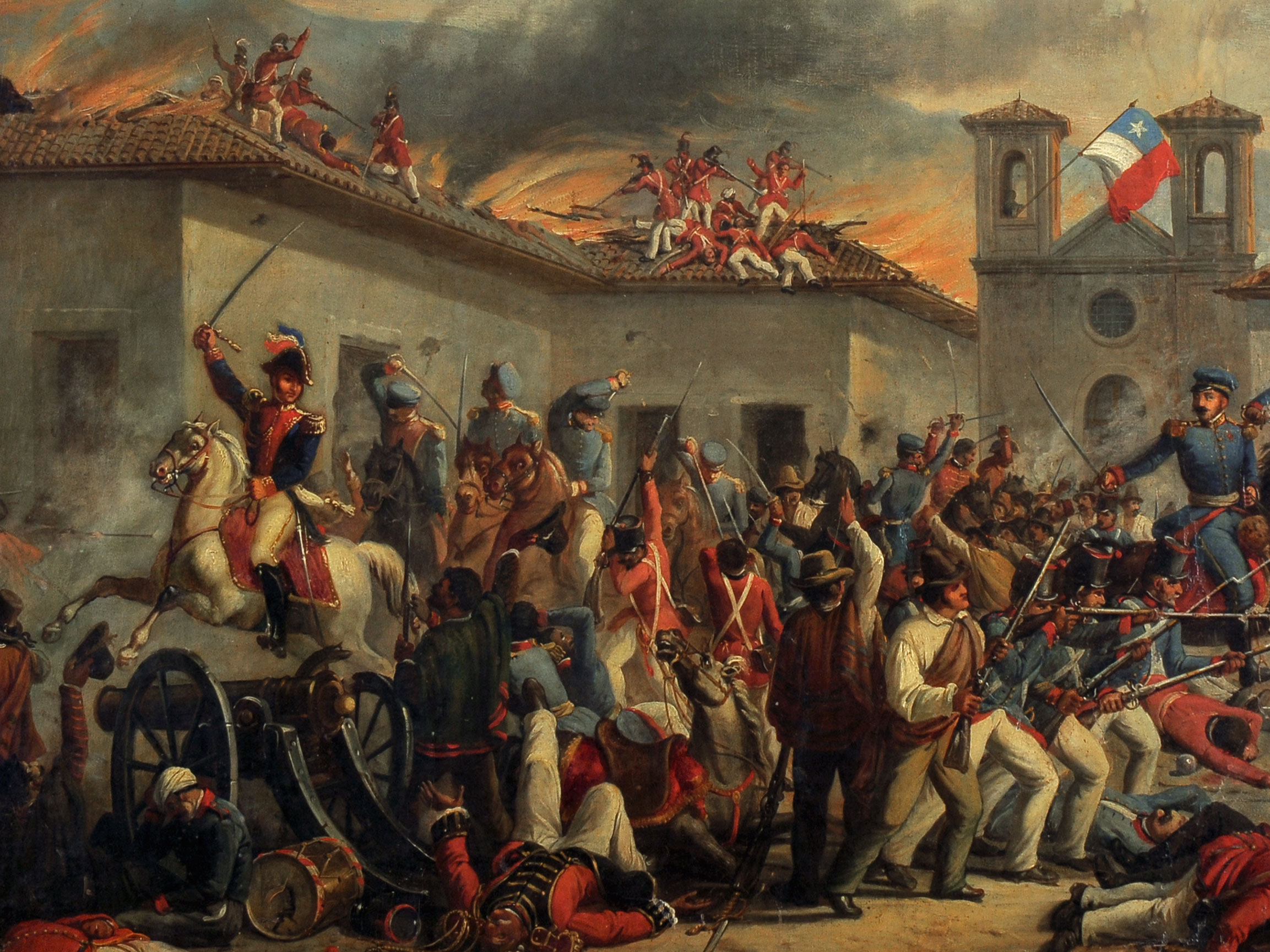
The Battle of Rancagua in 1814

During this period, royalist forces made advances into New Granada, which they controlled from 1815 to 1819, and into Chile, which they controlled from 1814 to 1817. Except for royalist areas in the northeast and south, the provinces of New Granada had maintained independence from Spain since 1810, unlike neighboring Venezuela, where royalists and pro-independence forces had exchanged control of the region several times. To pacify Venezuela and to retake New Granada, Spain organized in 1815 the largest armed force it ever sent to the New World, consisting of 10,500 troops and nearly sixty ships. Although this force was crucial in retaking a solidly pro-independence region like New Granada (see Spanish reconquest of New Granada), its soldiers were eventually spread out throughout Venezuela, New Granada, Quito, and Peru, and were lost to tropical diseases, diluting their impact on the war. More importantly, the majority of the royalist forces were composed, not of soldiers sent from the peninsula, but of Spanish Americans.

Overall, Europeans formed only about a tenth of the royalist armies in Spanish America, and only about half of the expeditionary units, once they were deployed in the Americas. Since each European soldier casualty was replaced by a Spanish American soldier, over time, there were more and more Spanish American soldiers in the expeditionary units. For example, Pablo Morillo, commander in chief of the expeditionary force sent to South America, reported that he had only 2,000 European soldiers under his command in 1820; in other words, only half the soldiers of his expeditionary force were European. It is estimated that in the Battle of Maipú only a quarter of the royalist forces were European soldiers, in the Battle of Carabobo about a fifth, and in the Battle of Ayacucho less than 1% was European.

The American militias reflected the racial make-up of the local population. For example, in 1820 the royalist army in Venezuela had 843 white (español), 5,378 Casta, and 980 Indigenous soldiers.

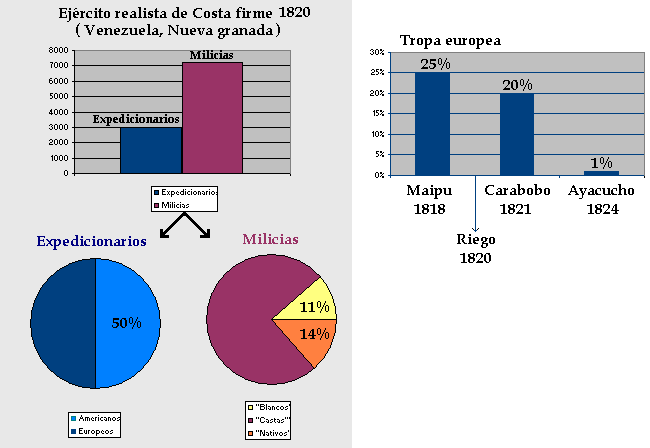
Royalist army

==== Pro-independence advances ====
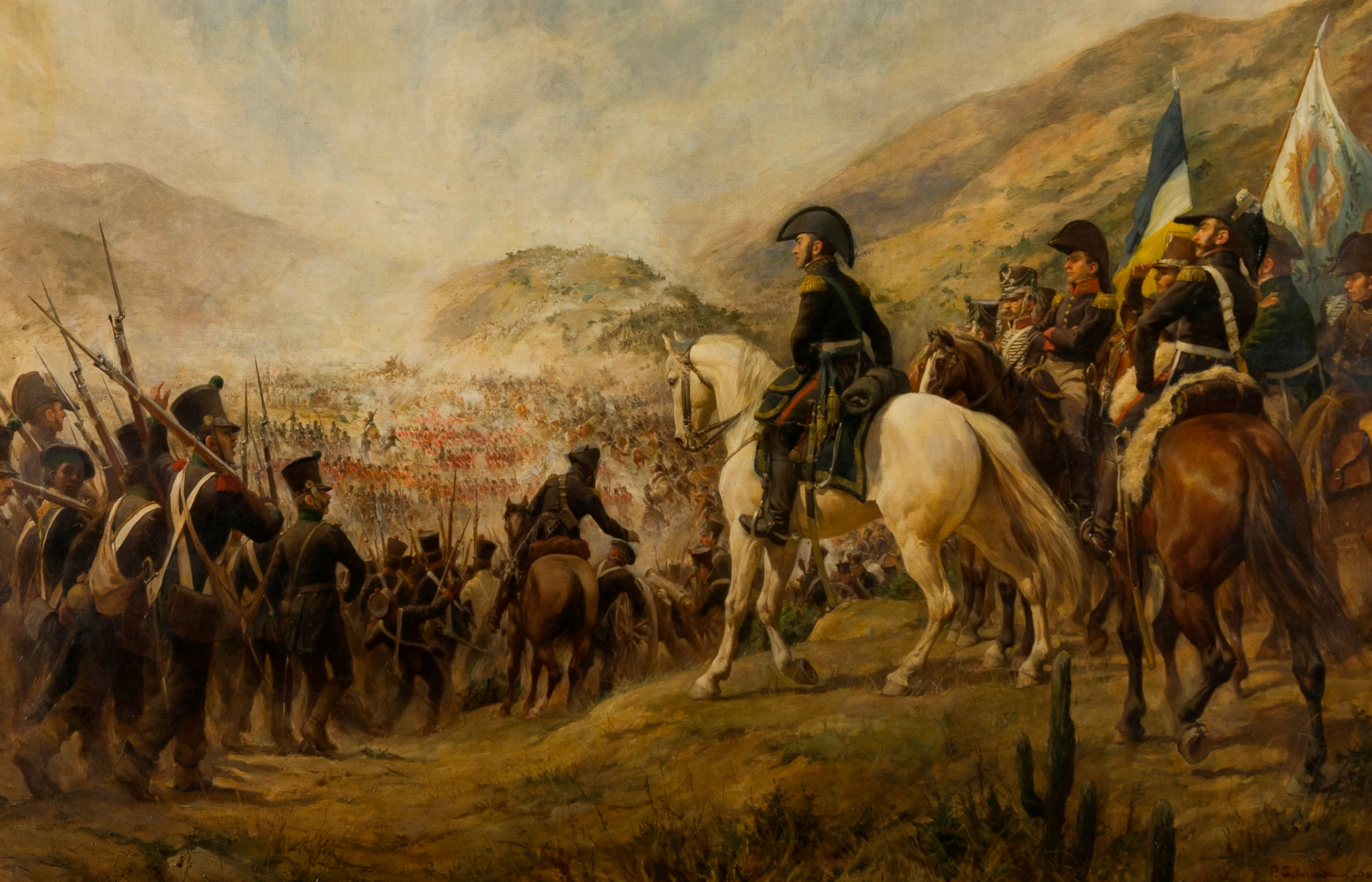
Chilean and Argentine troops marching to the Battle of Chacabuco

Towards the end of this period the pro-independence forces made two important advances. In the Southern Cone, a veteran of the Spanish army with experience in the Peninsular War, José de San Martín, became the governor of the Province of Cuyo. He used this position to begin organizing an army as early as 1814 in preparation for an invasion of Chile. This was an important change in strategy after three United Provinces campaigns had been defeated in Upper Peru. San Martín's army became the nucleus of the Army of the Andes, which received crucial political and material support in 1816 when Juan Martín de Pueyrredón became Supreme Director of the United Provinces. In January 1817, San Martín was finally ready to advance against the royalists in Chile. Ignoring an injunction from the congress of the Río de la Plata not to move against Chile, San Martín together with General Bernardo O'Higgins Riquelme, later Supreme Director of Chile, led the Army over the Andes in a move that turned the tables on the royalists. By 10 February, San Martín had control of northern and central Chile, and a year later, after a war with no quarter, the south. With the aid of a fleet under the command of former British naval officer Thomas Cochrane, Chile was secured from royalist control and independence was declared that year. San Martín and his allies spent the next two years planning an invasion of Peru, which began in 1820.

In northern South America, after several failed campaigns to take Caracas and other urban centers of Venezuela, Simón Bolívar devised a similar plan in 1819 to cross the Andes and liberate New Granada from the royalists. Like San Martín, Bolívar personally undertook the efforts to create an army to invade a neighboring country, collaborated with pro-independence exiles from that region, and lacked the approval of the Venezuelan congress. Unlike San Martín, however, Bolívar did not have a professionally trained army, but rather a quickly assembled mix of Llanero guerrillas, New Granadan exiles led by Santander and British recruits. From June to July 1819, using the rainy season as cover, Bolívar led his army across the flooded plains and over the cold, forbidding passes of the Andes, with heavy losses—a quarter of the British Legion perished, as well as many of his Llanero soldiers, who were not prepared for the nearly 4,000-meter altitudes—but the gamble paid off. By August Bolívar was in control of Bogotá and its treasury, and gained the support of many in New Granada, which still resented the harsh reconquest carried out under Morillo. Nevertheless, Santander found it necessary to continue the policy of the "war to the death" and carried out the execution of thirty-eight royalist officers who had surrendered. With the resources of New Granada, Bolívar became the undisputed leader of the Patriots in Venezuela and orchestrated the union of the two regions in a new state called Colombia (Gran Colombia).

=== Independence consolidated, 1820–1825 ===
1 January 1820, Rafael Riego headed a rebellion of Spanish expeditionary force to be sent to the Americas

To counter the advances the pro-independence forces had made in South America, Spain prepared a second, large, expeditionary force in 1819. This force, however, never left Spain. Instead, it became the means by which liberals were finally able to reinstate a constitutional regime. On 1 January 1820, Rafael Riego, commander of the Asturias Battalion, headed a rebellion among the troops, demanding the return of the 1812 Constitution. His troops marched through the cities of Andalusia with the hope of extending the uprising to the civilian population, but locals were mostly indifferent. An uprising, however, did occur in Galicia in northern Spain, and from there it quickly spread throughout the country. On 7 March, the royal palace in Madrid was surrounded by soldiers under the command of General Francisco Ballesteros, and three days later, on 10 March, the besieged Ferdinand VII, now a virtual prisoner, agreed to restore the Constitution.

Riego's Revolt had two significant effects on the war in the Americas. Militarily, the large numbers of reinforcements, which were especially needed to retake New Granada and defend the Viceroyalty of Peru, would never arrive. Furthermore, as the royalists' situation became more desperate in region after region, the army experienced wholesale defections of units to the Patriot side. Politically, the reinstitution of a liberal regime changed the terms under which the Spanish government sought to engage the insurgents. The new government naively assumed that the insurgents were fighting for Spanish liberalism and that the Spanish Constitution could still be the basis of reconciliation between the two sides. The government implemented the Constitution and held elections in the overseas provinces, just as in Spain. It also ordered military commanders to begin armistice negotiations with the insurgents with the promise that they could participate in the restored representative government.

==== New Spain and Central America ====
In effect, the Spanish Constitution of 1812 adopted by the Cortes of Cádiz served as the basis for independence in New Spain and Central America, since in both regions it was a coalition of conservative and liberal royalist leaders who led the establishment of new states. The Spanish Constitution of 1812 attempted to return to the policies that the Spanish government had implemented under Habsburg rule. These policies gave recognized Spanish colonial territory as fellow kingdoms with equal standing to Spain. The policies under the Habsburgs, moreover, allowed for constant revisionism, through corruption and the sale of office, that provided the opportunity to grant more rights and change policy to respond to the demands of the populations. The restoration of the Spanish Constitution and representative government was enthusiastically welcomed in New Spain and Central America. Elections were held, local governments formed and deputies sent to the Cortes. The Spanish Constitution of 1812 could have been an opportunity to enact social change slowly and without the threat of a radicalized uprising from the lower social classes by offering an opportunity to enact change that those in power would believe would best benefit their respective territories. Among liberals, however, there was fear that the new regime would not last; and conservatives and the Church worried that the new liberal government would expand its reforms and anti-clerical legislation. Yet, because the Cortes of Cádiz was located in Spain, political and economic power and decisions were localized in Spain, effectively giving them control over all of colonial Spanish America. These tensions further frustrated many Spanish-Americans because of their inability to control the politics that directly affected their economic and sociopolitical wellbeing, further leading them towards independence. This climate of instability created the conditions for the two sides to forge an alliance. This alliance coalesced towards the end of 1820 behind Agustín de Iturbide, a colonel in the royal army, who at the time was assigned to destroy the guerrilla forces led by Vicente Guerrero.

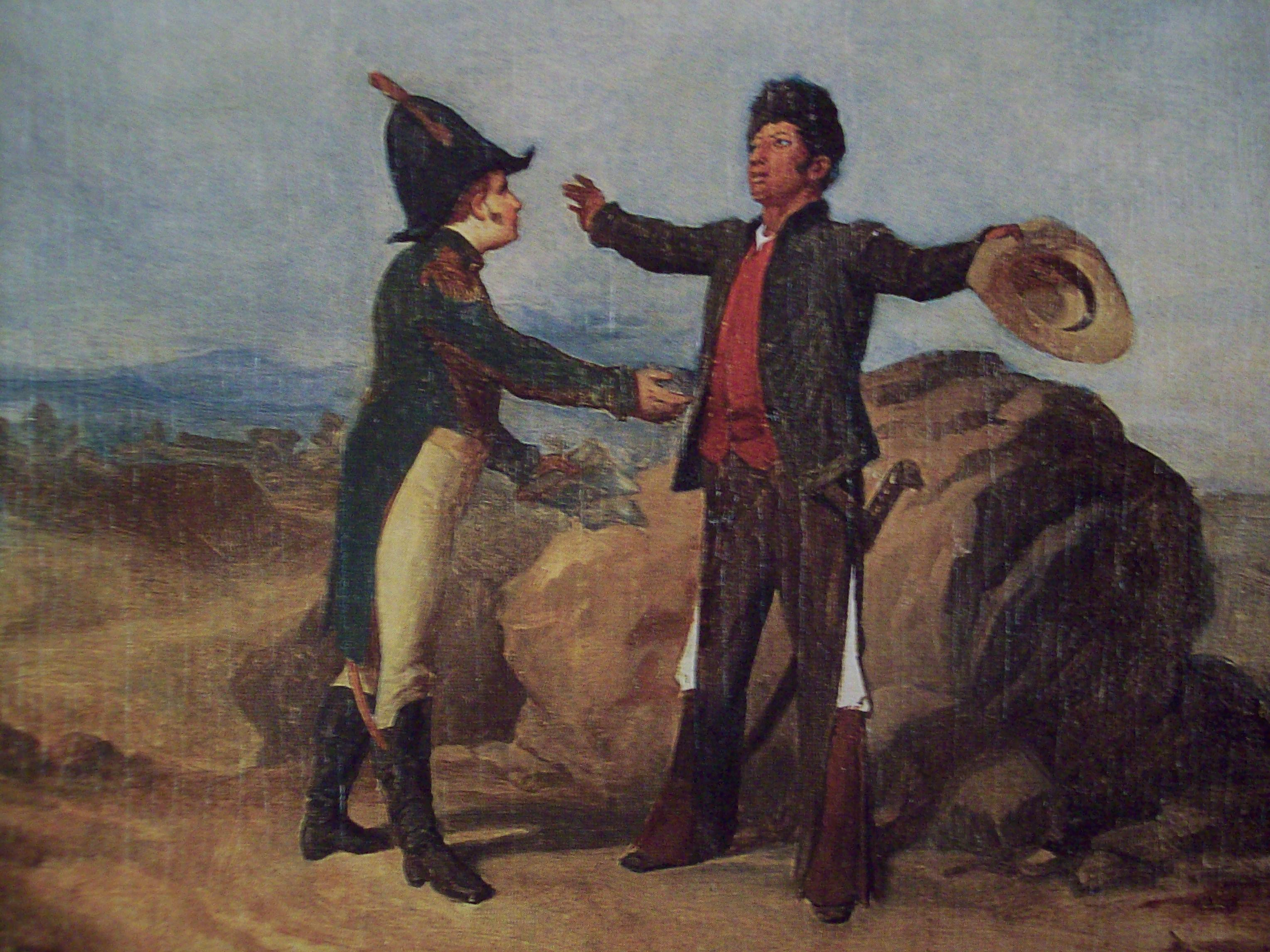
Vicente Guerrero and Agustín de Iturbide in the "Abrazo of Acatempan", when they agreed to combine forces to fight the royalist army. Oil painting by Román Sagredo, collection of the Museo Nacional de Historia, INAH, México.

In January 1821, in expectation of the abolition in Spain of the Constitution of 1812, Iturbide was chosen and was sent by the officials of New Spain with Guerrero, the leader of the rebellions. He began so-called "peace" negotiations, suggesting the parties unite to establish an independent New Spain. Later, Iturbide was dethroned and quietly captured to be executed. The simple terms that Iturbide proposed became the basis of the Plan of Iguala: the independence of New Spain (now to be called the Mexican Empire) with Ferdinand VII or another Bourbon as emperor; the retention of the Catholic Church as the official state religion and the protection of its existing privileges; and the equality of all New Spaniards, whether immigrants or native-born. Many of that laws was abolished decades later or are in present-day Mexico. The following month the other important guerrilla leader, Guadalupe Victoria, joined the alliance, and on 1 March Iturbide was proclaimed head of a new Army of the Three Guarantees. The representative of the new Spanish government, Superior Political Chief Juan O'Donojú, who replaced the previous viceroys, arrived in Veracruz on 1 July 1821, but he found that royalists held the entire country except for Veracruz, Mexico City and Acapulco. Since at the time that O'Donojú had left Spain, the Cortes was considering greatly expanding the autonomy of the overseas Spanish possessions, O'Donojú proposed to negotiate a treaty with Iturbide on the terms of the Plan of Iguala. The resulting Treaty of Córdoba, which was signed on 24 August, kept all existing laws, including the 1812 Constitution, in force until a new constitution for Mexico could be written. O'Donojú became part of the provisional governing junta until his death on 8 October. Both the Spanish Cortes and Ferdinand VII rejected the Treaty of Córdoba, and the final break with the mother country came on 19 May 1822, when the Mexican Congress conferred the throne on Iturbide. Spain initiated attempts to reconquer Mexico and it did not recognize Mexico's independence until 1836.

Central America gained its independence along with New Spain. On 15 September 1821, an Act of Independence was signed in Guatemala City which declared Central America (Guatemala, Honduras, El Salvador, Nicaragua, and Costa Rica) independent from Spain. The regional elites supported the terms of the Plan of Iguala and orchestrated the union of Central America with the Mexican Empire in January 1822. One years later, following Iturbide's downfall, the region, with the exception of Chiapas, peacefully seceded from Mexico on 1 July 1823, establishing the Federal Republic of Central America. The new state existed for seventeen years, centrifugal forces pulling the individual provinces apart by 1840.

==== South America ====
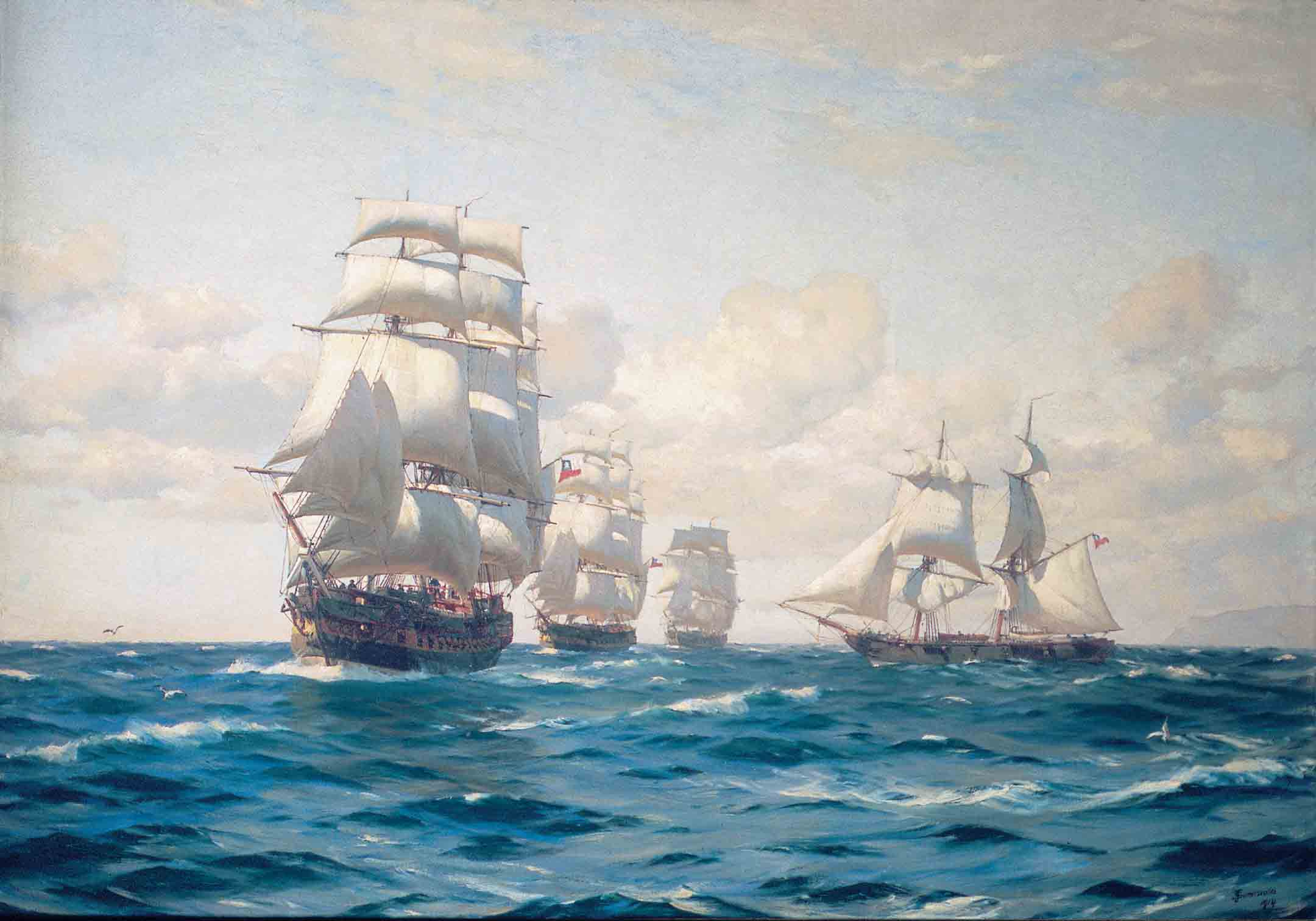
The First Chilean Navy Squadron engaged in the liberation of Peru and sailed as far as to Baja California raiding Spanish ships.

Unlike in New Spain and Central America, in South America independence was spurred by the pro-independence fighters who had held out for the past half-decade. José de San Martín and Simón Bolívar inadvertently led a continent-wide pincer movement from southern and northern South America that liberated most of the Spanish American nations on that continent. After securing the independence of Chile in 1818, San Martín concentrated on building a naval fleet in the Pacific to counter Spanish control of those waters and reach the royalist stronghold of Lima. By mid-1820 San Martín had assembled a fleet of eight warships and sixteen transport ships under the command of Admiral Cochrane. The fleet set sail from Valparaíso to Paracas in southern Peru. On 7 September, the army landed at Paracas and successfully took Pisco. After this, San Martín, waiting for a generalized Peruvian revolt, chose to avoid direct military confrontation. San Martín hoped that his presence would initiate an authentic Peruvian revolt against Spanish rule, believing that otherwise any liberation would be ephemeral. In the meantime, San Martín engaged in diplomacy with Viceroy Joaquín de la Pezuela, who was under orders from the constitutional government to negotiate on the basis of the 1812 Constitution and to maintain the unity of the Spanish monarchy. However, these efforts proved fruitless, since independence and unity of the monarchy could not be reconciled, so the army sailed in late October to a better strategic position in Huacho, in northern Peru. During the next few months, successful land and naval campaigns against the royalists secured the new foothold, and it was at Huacho that San Martín learned that Guayaquil (in Ecuador) had declared independence on 9 October.

Bolívar, learning about the collapse of the Cádiz expedition, spent the year 1820 preparing a liberating campaign in Venezuela. Bolívar was aided by Spain's new policy of seeking engagement with the insurgents, which Morillo implemented, renouncing to the command in chief, and returning to Spain. Although Bolívar rejected the Spanish proposal that the Patriots rejoin Spain under the Spanish Constitution, the two sides established a six-month truce and the regularization of the rules of engagement under the law of nations on 25 and 26 November. The truce did not last six months. It was apparent to all that the royalist cause had been greatly weakened by the lack of reinforcements. Royalist soldiers and whole units began to desert or defect to the Patriots in large numbers. On 28 January 1821, the ayuntamiento of Maracaibo declared the province an independent republic that chose to join the new nation-state of Gran Colombia. Miguel de la Torre, who had replaced Morillo as head of the army, took this to be a violation of the truce, and although the republicans argued that Maracaibo had switched sides of its own volition, both sides began to prepare for renewed war. The fate of Venezuela was sealed when Bolívar returned there in April leading an army of 7,000 from New Granada. At the Battle of Carabobo on 24 June, the Gran Colombian forces decisively defeated the royalist forces, assuring control of Venezuela save for Puerto Cabello and guaranteeing Venezuelan independence. Bolívar could now concentrate on Gran Colombia's claims to southern New Granada and Quito.

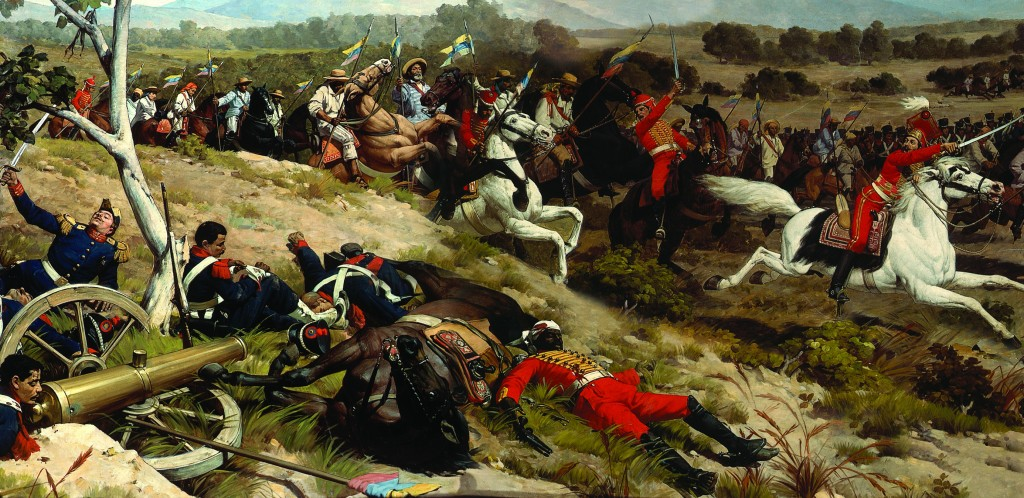
Battle of Carabobo, painting by Martín Tovar y Tovar

In Peru, on 29 January 1821, Viceroy Pezuela was deposed in a coup d'état by José de la Serna, but it would be two months before San Martín moved his army closer to Lima by sailing it to Ancón. During the next few months San Martín once again engaged in negotiations, offering the creation of an independent monarchy; but La Serna insisted on the unity of the Spanish monarchy, so the negotiations came to nothing. By July La Serna judged his hold on Lima to be weak, and on 8 July the royal army abandoned the coastal city to reinforce positions in the highlands, with Cuzco as new capital of the viceroyalty. On the 12th San Martín entered Lima, where he was declared "Protector of the Country" on 28 July, an office which allowed him to rule the newly independent state.

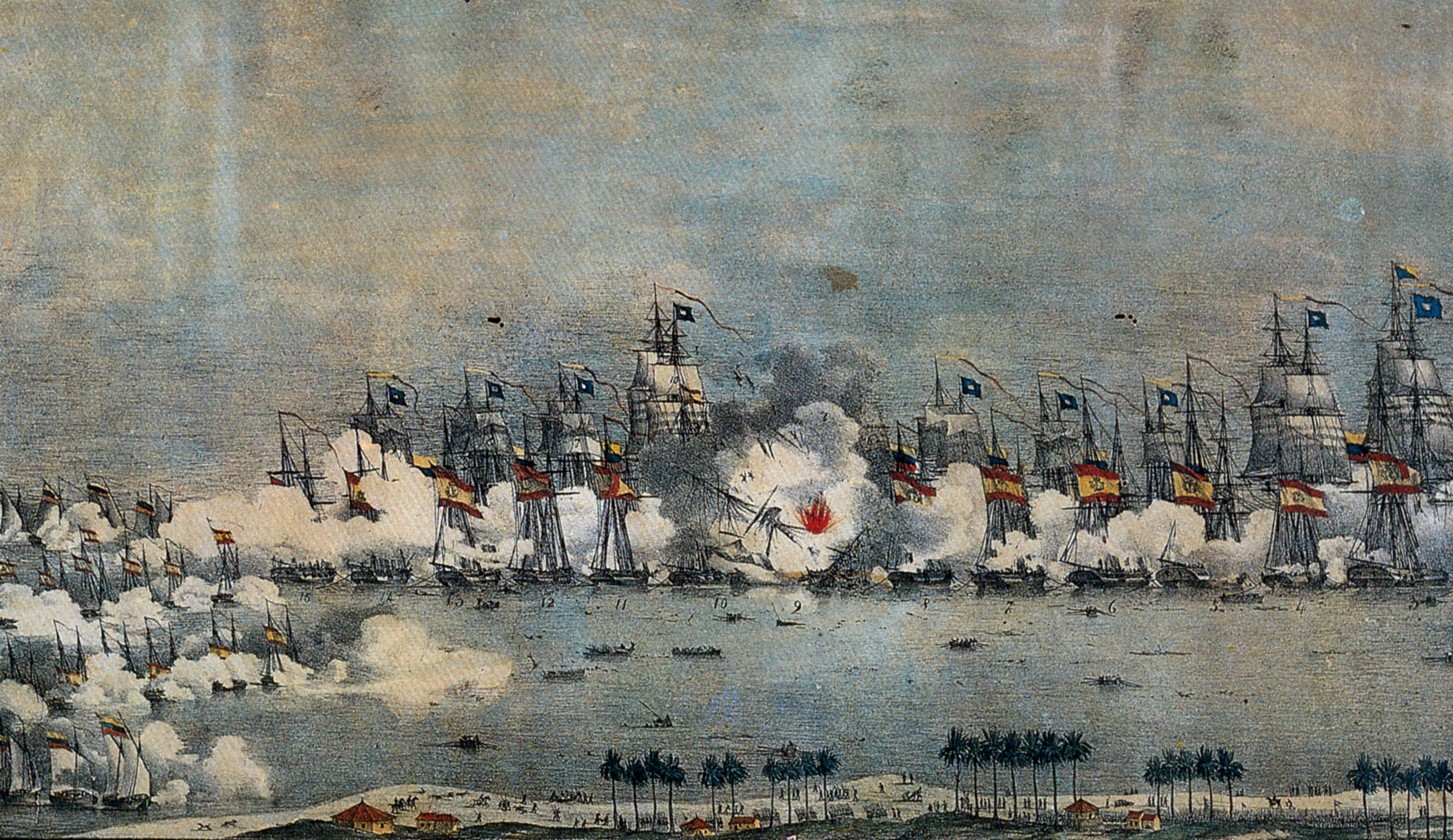
Battle of Lake Maracaibo in 1823 resulted in the final expulsion of the Spanish from Gran Colombia

To ensure that the Presidency of Quito became a part of Gran Colombia and did not remain a collection of small, divided republics, Bolívar sent aid in the form of supplies and an army under Antonio José de Sucre to Guayaquil in February 1821. For a year Sucre was unable to take Quito, and by November both sides, exhausted, signed a ninety-day armistice. The following year, at the Battle of Pichincha on 24 May 1822, Sucre's Venezuelan forces finally conquered Quito; Gran Colombia's hold on the territory was secure. The following year, after a Peruvian Patriot army was destroyed in the Battle of Ica, San Martín met with Simón Bolívar in Guayaquil on 26 and 27 July. Thereafter San Martín decided to retire from the scene. For the next two years, two armies of Rioplatense (Argentinian), Chilean, Colombian and Peruvian Patriots were destroyed trying to penetrate the royalist bastion in the Andean regions of Peru and Upper Peru. A year later a Peruvian congress resolved to make Bolívar head of the Patriot forces in the country. An internecine conflict between La Serna and General Pedro Antonio Olañeta, which was an extension of the Liberal Triennium, proved to be the royalists' undoing. La Serna lost control of half of his best army by the beginning of 1824, giving the Patriots an opportunity.

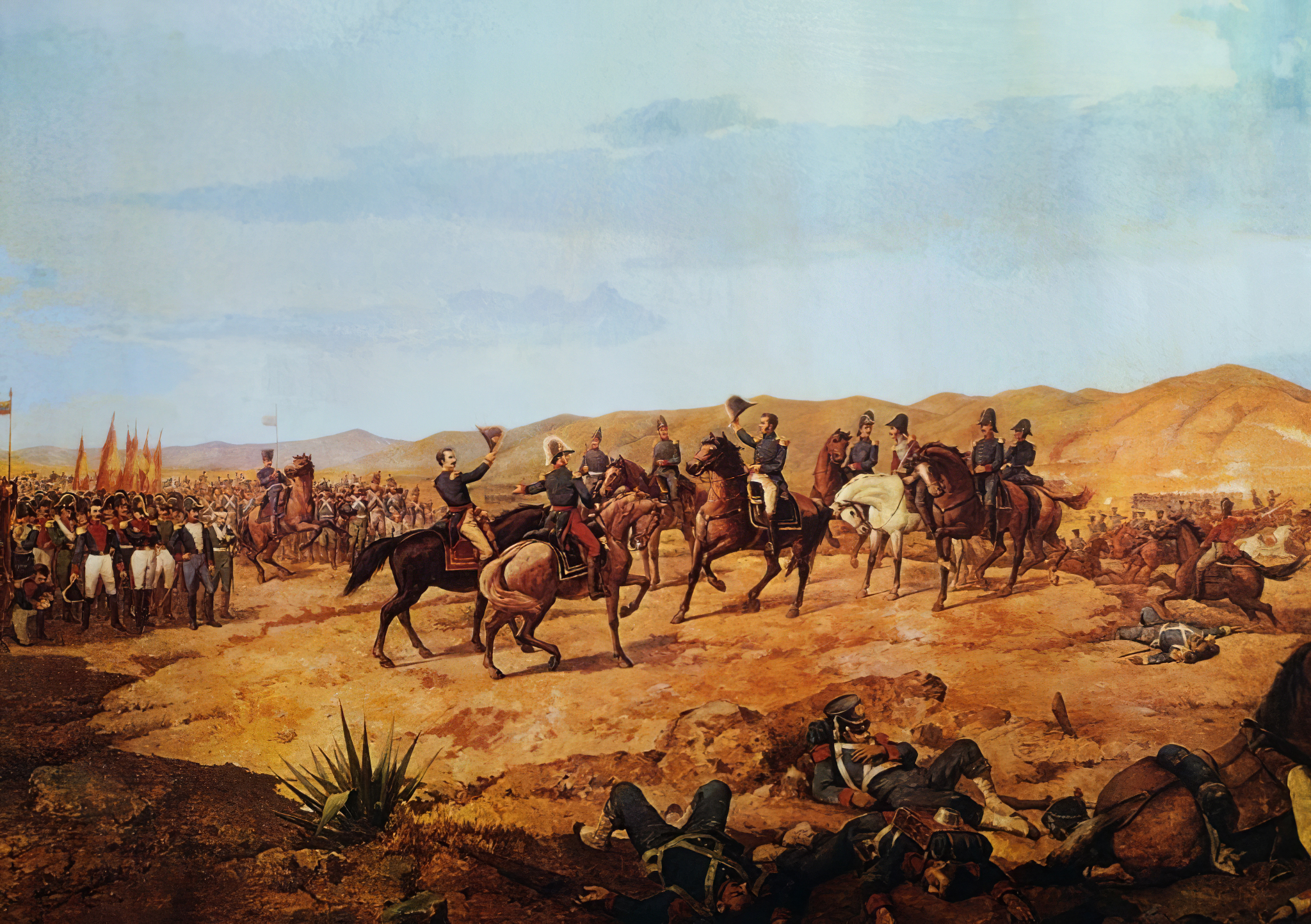
The Battle of Ayacucho, in Peru, ensured the independence of South America in 1824

Under the command of Bolívar and Sucre, the experienced veterans of the combined army, mainly Colombians, destroyed a royalist army under La Serna's command in the Battle of Ayacucho on 9 December 1824. La Serna's army was numerically superior but consisted of mostly new recruits. The only significant royalist area remaining on the continent was the highland country of Upper Peru. Following the Battle of Ayacucho, the royalist troops of Upper Peru under the command of Olañeta surrendered after he died in Tumusla on 2 April 1825. Bolívar tended to favor maintaining the unity of Upper Peru with Peru, but the Upper Peruvian leaders—many former royalists, like Casimiro Olañeta, nephew of General Olañeta—gathered in a congress under Sucre's auspices supported the country's independence. Bolívar left the decision to Sucre, who went along with the congress. Sucre proclaimed Upper Peru's independence in the city which now bears his name on 6 August, bringing the main wars of independence to an end.

As it became clear that there was to be no reversal of Spanish American independence, several of the new states began to receive international recognition. Early, in 1822, the United States recognized Chile, the United Provinces of the Río de la Plata, Peru, Gran Colombia, and Mexico. Britain waited until 1825, after the Battle of Ayacucho, to recognize Mexico, Gran Colombia, and Río de la Plata. Both nations recognized more Spanish American states in the next few years.

=== Last royalist bastions, 1825–1833 ===
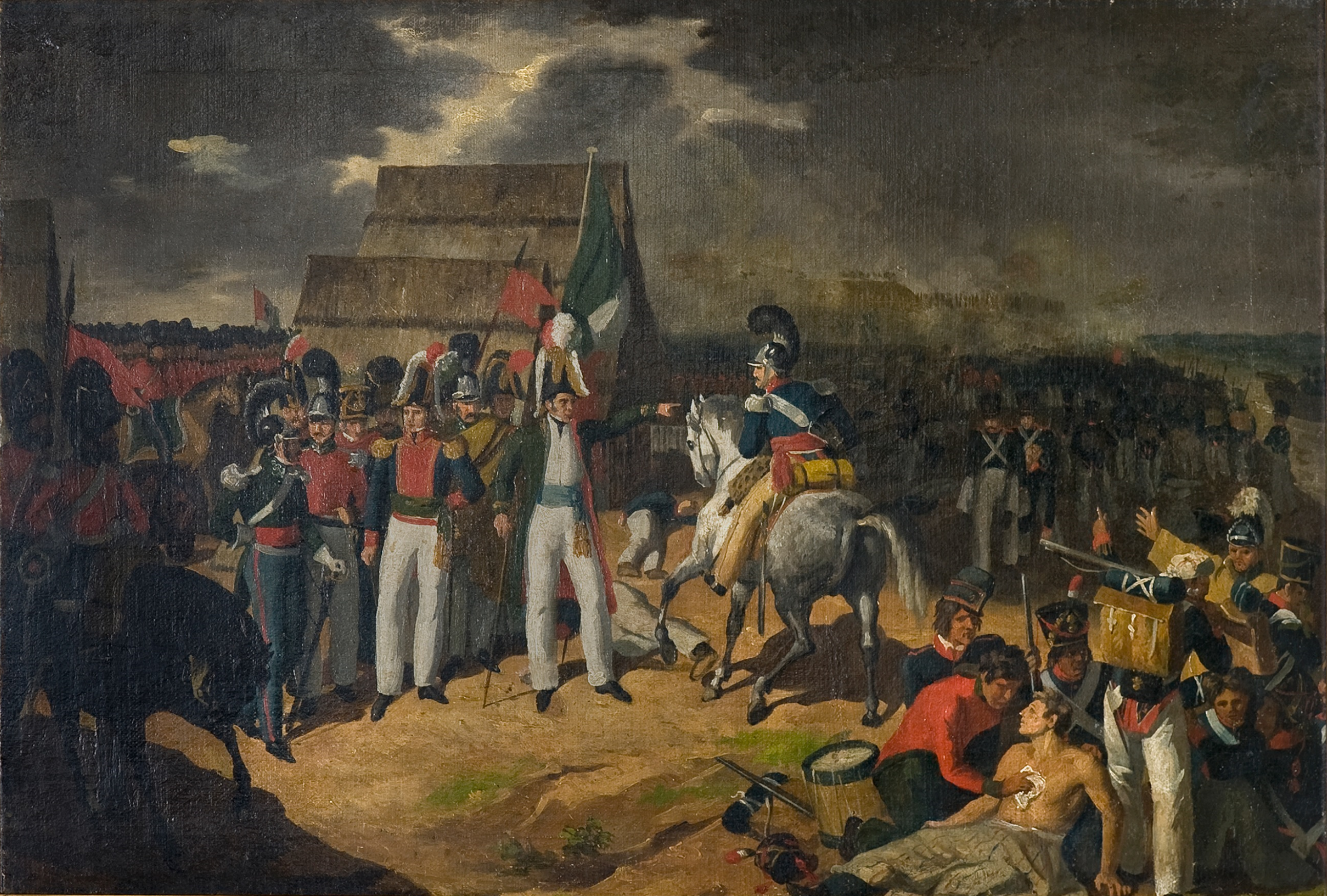
Spain fails to reconquer Mexico at the Battle of Tampico in 1829

The Spanish coastal fortifications in Veracruz, Callao and Chiloé were the footholds that resisted until 1825–1826. In the following decade, royalist guerrillas continued to operate in several countries and Spain launched a few attempts to retake parts of the Spanish American mainland. In 1827 Colonel José Arizabalo started an irregular war with Venezuelan guerrillas, and Brigadier Isidro Barradas led the last attempt with regular troops to reconquer Mexico in 1829. The Pincheira brothers moved to Patagonia and remained there as a multiethnic royalist outlaws gang until defeated in 1832. But efforts like these did not reverse the new political situation.

The increasing irrelevance of the Holy Alliance after 1825 and the fall of the Bourbon dynasty in France in 1830 during the July Revolution eliminated the principal support of Ferdinand VII in Europe, but it was not until the king's death in 1833 that Spain finally abandoned all plans of military reconquest, and in 1836 its government went so far as to renounce sovereignty over all of continental America. During the course of the 19th century, Spain would recognize each of the new states. Only Cuba, Puerto Rico, the Spanish Virgin Islands and, briefly, Santo Domingo remained under Spanish rule, until the Spanish–American War in 1898.

== Effects of independence ==
=== Economics ===
The nearly decade and a half of wars greatly weakened the Spanish American economies and political institutions, which hindered the region's potential economic development for most of the nineteenth century and resulted in the enduring instability the region experienced. Independence destroyed the de facto trade bloc that was the Spanish Empire – Manila galleons and Spanish treasure fleets in particular. After independence, trade among the new Spanish American nations was less than it had been in the colonial period. Once the ties were broken, the small populations of most of the new nations provided little incentive to entice Spanish American producers to recreate the old trade patterns. In addition, the protection against European competition, which the Spanish monopoly had provided to the manufacturing sectors of the economy, ended. Due to expediency, protective tariffs for these sectors, in particular textile production, were permanently dropped and foreign imports beat out local production. This greatly affected Native communities, which in many parts of Spanish America, specialized in supplying finished products to the urban markets, albeit using pre-industrial-quarters in Mexico. Cities dependent on seaborne trade like Valdivia plunged into depression as the intracolonial trade system collapsed.

Foreign trade policies varied among the new countries, some like the United Provinces of the Río de la Plata and Peru applied initially protectionist policies while Chile was more open to foreign trade while still applying a kind of neomercantilism.

The new states that began to take root in Hispanic America, particularly Mexico, often courted foreign financial support from European nations. This foreign investment often came via loans, which only continued to cripple economies that had been destroyed or left alone during conflict. This investment was not enough to support economic recovery and can be considered to have only further negatively impacted economic growth in these newly developing states by pushing them further into debt in an attempt to recover and grow their economies. As the newly independent nations finally entered the world economy after the end of the French Revolutionary and Napoleonic Wars, when the economies of Europe and the United States were recovering and aggressively seeking new markets to sell their products after more than two decades of disruption. Ultimately Spanish America could only connect to the world markets as an exporter of raw materials and a consumer of finished products.

=== Society ===
Independence from the Spanish crown required solidarity across all social classes. However, each social faction had their ideas of what local society should and would look like after independence. This impacted the ability for societies to easily integrate because of the disunity of their ideas of future political systems and ideologies, which resulted in more conflict when it came to state consolidation. The power which the elite Creole class commanded allowed them to control state and national development to ensure that they remained in power. As a result, the newly forming Hispanic American states would fulfill some of the demands of other social factions to ensure the stability and integration of all into the social fabric of a new state while guaranteeing the continual reproduction of the Creole elite into position of power and control over the rest of society.

The political debate seeking answers to these questions was marked by a clash between liberalism and conservatism. Conservatives sought to maintain the traditional social structures to ensure stability; liberals sought to create a more dynamic society and economy by ending ethnically based social distinctions and freeing property from economic restrictions. In its quest to transform society, liberals often adopted policies that were not welcomed by Native communities, who had benefited from unique protections afforded to them by traditional Spanish law.

Independence, however, did initiate the abolition of slavery in Spanish America, as it was seen as part of the independence struggle, since many slaves had gained their manumission by joining the Patriot armies. In areas where slavery was not a major source of labor (Mexico, Central America, Chile), emancipation occurred almost immediately after independence was achieved. In areas where slavery was a main labor source (Colombia, Venezuela, Peru, Argentina), emancipation was carried out in steps over the next three decades, usually first with the creation of free-womb laws and programs for compensated emancipation. By the early 1850s, slavery had been abolished in the independent nations of Spanish America.

=== Role of women ===
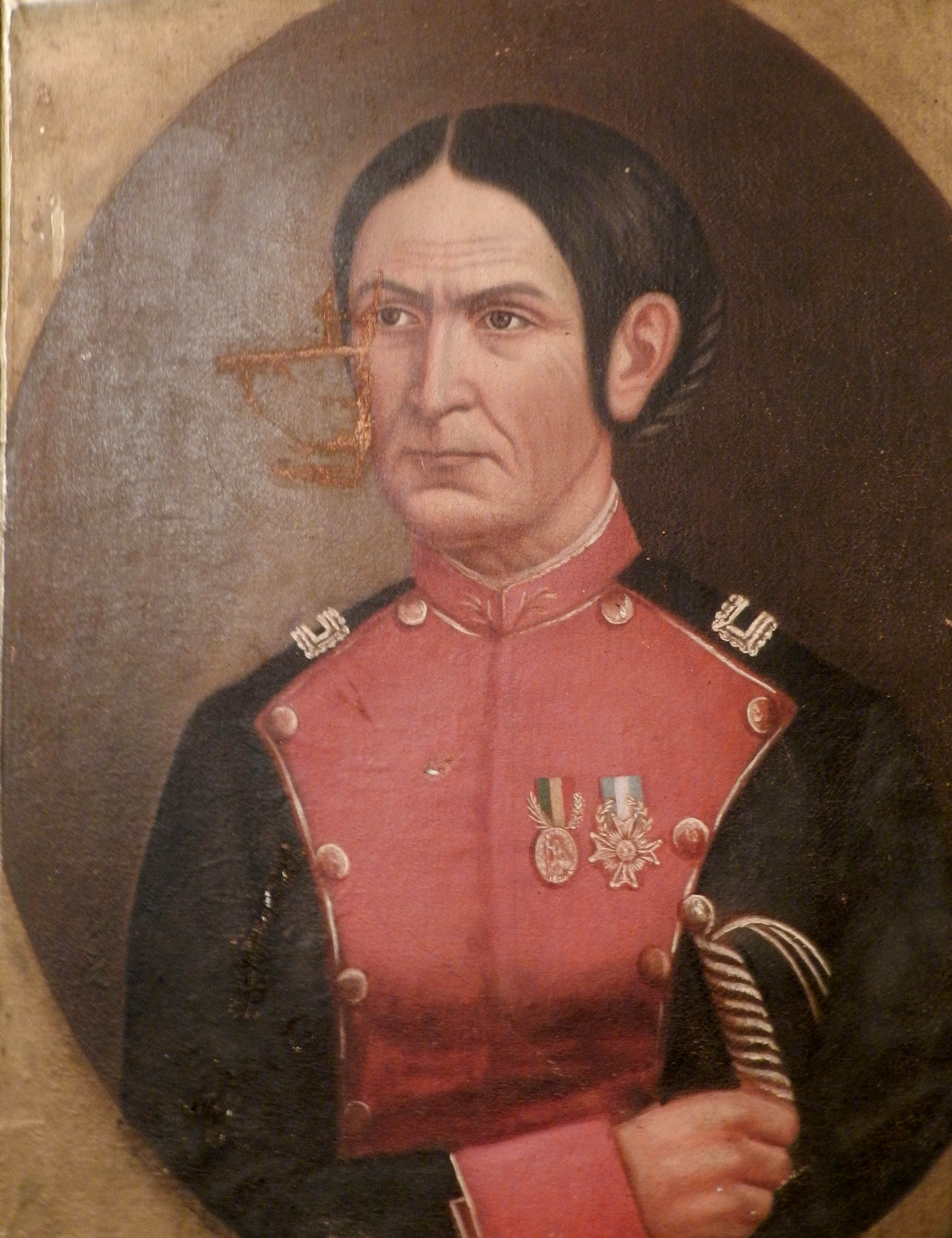
Juana Azurduy de Padilla, a Mestiza leader of independence in Rio de la Plata.

Women were not simply spectators throughout the independence wars of Spanish America. Many women took sides on political issues and joined independence movements and participated on many different levels. Women could not help but act as caring mothers, sisters, wives and daughters of the men who were fighting. Women created political organizations and organized meetings and groups to donate food and supplies to the soldiers.

Some women supported the wars as spies, informants and combatants. Manuela Sáenz was a long term lover of Simón Bolívar and acted as his spy and confidante and was secretary of his archive. She saved his life on two occasions, nursed wounded soldiers and has even been believed some historians to have fought in a few battles. Sáenz followed Bolívar and his army through the independence wars and became known in Hispanic America as the "mother of feminism and women's emancipation and equal rights." In New Spain, women such as Leona Vicario and Josefa Ortiz de Domínguez participated in similar activities as spies and insurgents, and as part of a broader movement of women in the Mexican War of Independence. They are now celebrated as national heroines.

Bolívar himself was a supporter of women's rights and suffrage in Hispanic America. It was Bolívar who allowed for Sáenz to become the great pioneer of women's freedom. He wanted to set the women of Hispanic America free from the oppression and inferiority of what the Spanish regime had established. Bolívar even made Sáenz a Colonel of the Colombian Army due to her heroics which caused controversy because there were no women in the army at the time. Another woman who gained prominence in the fight for independence was Juana Azurduy de Padilla, a mixed-race woman who fought for independence in the Río de la Plata region. Argentine President Cristina Fernández de Kirchner posthumously promoted her to the rank of general. Javiera Carrera was also a significant figure in the Chilean War of Independence, who used her family influence and status to form social groups of women to advocate for independence. Carrera sewed the first Chilean flag as a sign of their independence and endured imprisonment multiple times in her life as a result of her great contributions. She is seen as one of the main female figures in Chilean Independence. Another significant figure in documenting the experiences of women during the Independence Wars was Marquita Sanchez, also known as Madame Mendeville. Sanchez recorded many of her experiences during the Argentine Independence War while also recording accounts of her daily life as a female activist during this period in history. She also helped record several events and battles central to the Argentine military and their continued fighting against the Spanish.

According to gender stereotypes, women were not meant to be soldiers; only men were supposed to engage in fighting and conflict. There were still plenty of women present on the battlefields to help rescue and nurse soldiers. Some women fought alongside their husbands and sons on the battlefield. The majority of women assumed supportive and non-competitive roles such as fundraising and caring for the sick. Revolution for women meant something different from for men. Women saw revolution as a way to earn equal rights, such as voting, and to overcome the suppression and subordination of women to men. Women were usually identified as victims during the independence wars since the women of Hispanic America were forced to sacrifice for the cause. The ideals of womanhood meant that women must sacrifice what the situation required, such as a mother sacrificing her son or a virgin knowing she might be sacrificing motherhood or marriage due to the loss of many young men. This view meant that women were meant to contribute to independence in a supportive role while leaving the combat and politics in the hands of the men.

=== Government and politics ===
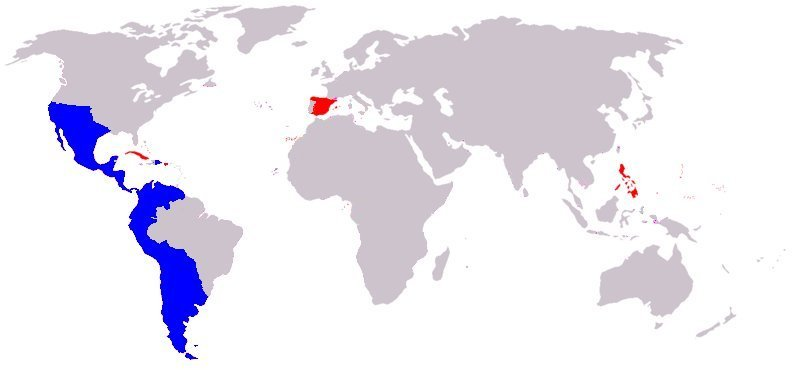
An imagined grouping of countries (in blue) that gained independence during the reign of Ferdinand VII, formerly part of the Spanish Empire.

Independence also did not result in stable political regimes, save in a few countries. First, the new nations did not have well-defined identities; rather, the process of creating identities was only beginning. This process would be carried out through newspapers and the creation of national symbols, including new names for the countries ("Mexico", "Colombia", "Ecuador", "Bolivia", "Argentina"), that broke with the past. In addition, the borders were not firmly established, and the struggle between federalism and centralism, which began in independence, continued throughout the rest of the century. Two large states that emerged from the wars—Gran Colombia and the Federal Republic of Central America—collapsed after a decade or two, and Argentina would not consolidate politically until the 1860s.

The wars destroyed the old civilian bureaucracy that had governed the region for centuries, as institutions such as the audiencias were eliminated and many Peninsular officials fled to Spain. The Catholic Church, which had been an important social and political institution during the colonial period, initially came out weakened by the end of the conflicts. As with government officials, many Peninsular bishops abandoned their dioceses and their posts were not filled for decades until new prelates could be created and relations between the new nations and the Vatican were regularized. Then as the Church recovered, its economic and political power was attacked by liberals.

Despite the fact that the period of the wars of independence itself was marked by a rapid expansion of representative government, for several of the new nations the nineteenth century was marked by militarism because of the lack of well-defined political and national institutions. The armies and officers that came into existence during the process of independence wanted to ensure that they got their rewards once the struggle was over. Many of these armies did not fully disband once the wars were over and they proved to be one of the stabler institutions in the first decades of national existence. These armies and their leaders effectively influenced the course of political development. Out of this new tradition came the caudillos, strongmen who amassed formal and informal economic, military and political power in themselves.

== Foreign support ==
=== United Kingdom ===
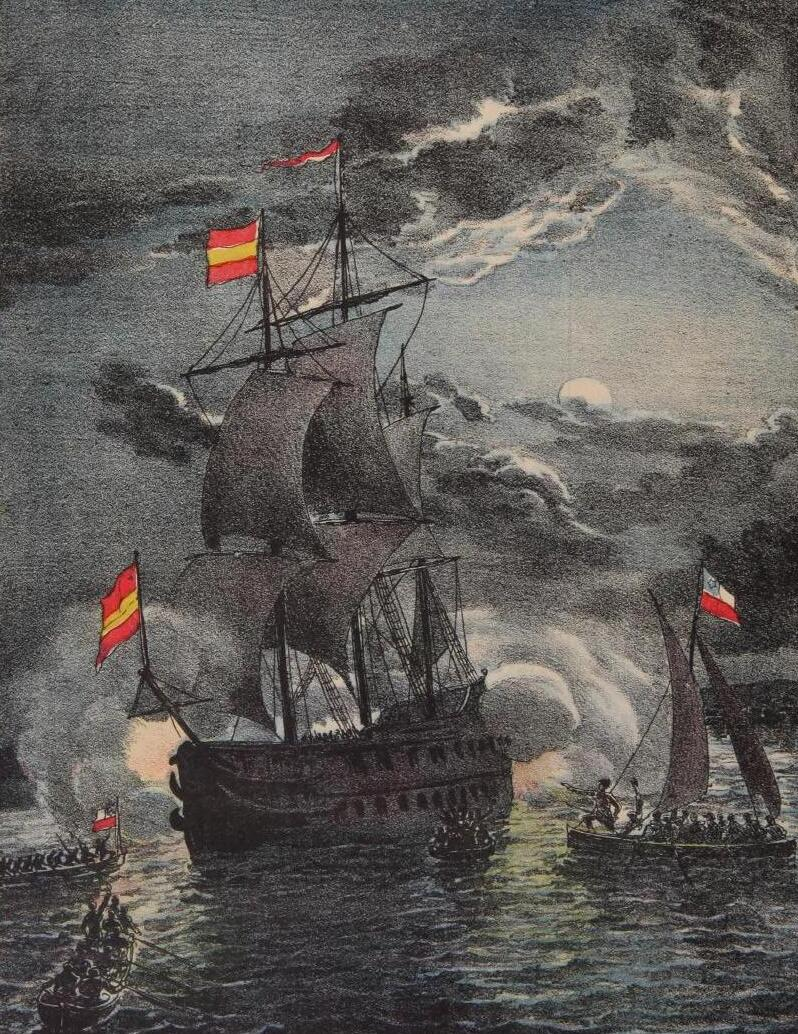
The Chilean navy led by Thomas Cochrane capturing the Spanish frigate Esmeralda on the night of 5 November 1820

Britain wanted to see an end to Spanish rule in South America and ultimately tap the monopoly of the important potential markets there. At the same time they wanted Spain as an ally to keep the balance of power in post-Napoleonic Europe. To fulfil this, Britain went covert in support of the Revolutionaries in South America. In a kind of private free enterprise going by the law, she sent men, financial and material support to help the insurgents fight against Spain.

One of the most significant contributions were the British Legions, a volunteer unit that fought under Simón Bolívar. This force numbered upwards of 6,000 men – the majority of whom were composed of veterans of the Napoleonic Wars. In combat their greatest achievements were at Boyacá (1819), Carabobo (1821), Pichincha (1822) and Ayacucho (1824) which secured independence for Colombia, Venezuela, Ecuador and Peru from Spanish rule respectively. Bolívar described the Legions and all who served in them as "the saviours of my country".

Many members of the Royal Navy also volunteered for the revolutionary forces. The most famous being Thomas Cochrane who reorganised the Chilean navy, most of whom were composed of Royal Navy veterans. Amongst many feats he captured the Spanish fortress of Valdivia in 1820; and in the same year he captured the flagship of the Spanish South American fleet, the Esmeralda, in the port of Callao. As well as helping Chile gain independence from Spain Cochrane did the same for Peru too by mounting an effective blockade and transporting troops. He then moved on to Brazil in their fight for independence from Portugal.

At their peak by 1819 around 10,000 men from the British Isles served in South America to fight against the Spanish.

British diplomacy also played a key role; in particular the role of foreign secretaries Viscount Castlereagh and later George Canning both of whom wanted to see the demise of Spain's South American colonies. Castlereagh's greatest achievement was to settle a deal with the European powers at the Congress of Aix-La-Chapelle in 1818 and the Congress of Verona four years later. This blocked aid to Spain which inhibited her reconquest of South America. With the Royal Navy in command of the oceans this set the precedence - they were also a decisive factor in the struggle for independence of certain Hispanic American countries.

=== France ===
Napoleon Bonaparte aimed to dominate both the Iberian Peninsula and Spanish America. His brother, Joseph Bonaparte, who was appointed king of Spain and its colonies from 1808 to 1813, never signed any documents recognizing Hispanic American independence. Napoleon, for his part, never renounced these territories. After losing the war in Spain, he restored the Spanish crown to its rightful monarch, Ferdinand VII, in 1813 through the Treaty of Valençay. Following the restoration of Bourbon rule, France became an ally of Ferdinand VII in the Iberian Peninsula, supporting absolutism in Spain during the Ominous Decade. This included military intervention via the Hundred Thousand Sons of Saint Louis. However, France did not provide material aid or troops to either the Royalist or Patriot sides in the Spanish American Wars of Independence.

=== United States ===
The intervention of the United States was due to two distinct causes; a territorial annexation and a revolts within the Spanish territories itself.

The Republic of West Florida was a short-lived republic in 1810 in the westernmost region of Spanish West Florida, which after less than three months was annexed and occupied by the United States a little later in 1810, and then became part of the territory of Louisiana. The Republic of East Florida was another republic declared against Spanish rule of East Florida by insurgents who wanted its annexation by the United States without success. In 1819, the Treaty of Florida was signed between Spain and the United States, and Spain ceded all of Florida to the United States.

In 1811, the Spanish crushed the San Antonio (Texas) revolt during the revolution against the royalists in the Mexican War of Independence. The remaining rebels then turned to the United States for help. Bernardo Gutiérrez de Lara traveled to Washington, D.C. Gutierrez gained the support of Augustus Magee and formed a U.S. filibuster force in Louisiana. A green flag from the expedition represented the rebels. The Northern Republican Army was defeated in the bloodiest battle in Texas, the Battle of Medina. Thus, Texas was incorporated into the Mexican Independence, and later Texas Independence and its annexation to the United States took place.

The United States remained neutral. Thus, for the rest of Madison's term, until 1817, a theoretical United States neutrality held pending the development of events in the Old World. Madison's policy of neutrality favored insurgents and this, along with the border-line problems in North America, led to a situation of pre-war tension with Spain. This situation forced the United States to act very cautiously in the Spanish-American issue, since it was trying to avoid at all costs to give an excuse for European intervention. At the end, the recognition in 1822 also was very delicate, at the international level the North American position against European powers.

Despite the carefulness of the United States to not stoke European powers, in 1823 President James Monroe established the Monroe Doctrine. This was a decree to stop any new European colonialism in the Americas by threat of military intervention. It was outlined as noncolonialism (keeping Europe away from establishing new colonies), keeping the United States out of strictly European affairs, and to treat any potential invasions of American countries as if an affront to the United States itself. This was mostly to protect American interests.

Due to newspaper romanticism, the American public overwhelmingly backed these revolts and thus were very sympathetic to the Latin American cause. Simón Bolívar became a household name throughout the United States as many saw him as the equivalent of George Washington.

=== Russia ===
The Spanish navy had been totally dismantled by a disastrous naval policy and relegated to the background by the urgency of the war against Napoleon itself. To 1817, Tsar Alexander supported reactionary governments. Ferdinand VII applied to the Tsar to purchase vessels. The Tsar agreed to this request with the offer of the sale of some of his own vessels. The agreement was finally negotiated at Madrid, between Dmitry Tatishchev, Russian ambassador, and Eguia, Minister of war. It was apparently known only to these two, and to the king himself. The text of the treaty of sale has not been found in the Spanish naval archives. This diplomatic transaction was veiled in the deepest secrecy against Spanish Navy and Minister of Navy.

The requested fleet would consist of 5 warships and 3 frigates. The squadron would be delivered to Cadiz, duly armed, and supplied. The arrival of the Russian fleet in Cadiz in February 1818 was not to the liking of the Spanish navy, which was dissatisfied with the state of deterioration in which some supposedly new ships were found: between 1820 and 1823 all the warships were scrapped as being useless. This fiasco put an end to the whole plan to reconquer the Rio de la Plata, which would end with the uprising of the Spanish Army in Cadiz (Trienio Liberal). In 1818 one of the frigates (Maria Isabel aka Patrikki) was captured in the Pacific, after the uprising of one of the Spanish troop transports that went over to the side of the American rebels delivering all the keys, routes and signals for the capture of the frigate. Only two of the Russian frigates provided important services in the Caribbean in defense of the island of Cuba, although they only made the one-way trip, they got lost, sunk when they arrived in Havana.

=== Portuguese Empire ===
After a long colonial dispute between Spain, and to avoid insurgency in this disputed territory, the Portuguese government organized an Army to defend the city of Montevideo against the revolutionaries (1811) and to annex the disputed territory of Banda Oriental against Spain (1816).

In 1811, the first Portuguese invasion took place in support of the besieged city of Montevideo. The Portuguese invasion forces were commanded by the governor and captain general of the Captaincy of Rio Grande de São Pedro, Diogo de Sousa, and their declared objective was to help Montevideo and the viceroy of the Río de la Plata, Francisco Javier de Elío, who was besieged by revolutionary forces from the United Provinces of the Río de la Plata. The invasion included clashes with eastern forces led by José Gervasio Artigas. After an ephemeral agreement, the Portuguese did not completely abandon the occupied territory.

In 1816, the second Portuguese Invasion or War against Artigas, giving rise to the armed conflict that took place between 1816 and 1820 in the entire territory of the Banda Oriental, in the Argentine Mesopotamia and southern Brazil, and which resulted in the annexation of the Banda Oriental to the Portuguese Empire, with the name of Cisplatina. This annexation broke relations with Spain, which prepared an army in Spain to recover Montevideo and invade the Río de la Plata, but this project ended up in rebellion of entire Army in 1820 in Cádiz. Portugal tried to ensure its annexation by being the first country to grant international recognition of the independence of Hispanic American Republics in 1821.

== Overview ==
=== Wars, battles, and revolts ===
In Spain, Riego's Rebellion was critical on the military balance in South America because it enabled Rioplatense, Chilean, and Colombian revolutionaries to converge against the Viceroy of Peru. In New Spain, Agustín de Iturbide echoed Riego's revolt, beginning a process that led to Mexican independence seven months later.

Mexico, Guatemala and Philippines	New Granada, Venezuela, and Quito
Mexico: Mexican War of Independence; Battle of Calderón Bridge; Expedition of Mina; Army of the Three Guarantees; Central America: 1811 Independence Movement; Federal Republic of Central America; Philippines: Novales Rebellion	Venezuelan War of Independence; First Republic of Venezuela; Second Republic of Venezuela; Congress of Angostura; Patria Boba; United Provinces of New Granada; Gran Colombia; Bolívar's campaign to liberate New Granada; Battle of Boyacá; Battle of Carabobo; Congress of Cúcuta; Ecuadorian War of Independence; Luz de América; Battle of Pichincha

Río de la Plata, Paraguay and Upper Peru	Chile and Peru
May Revolution; Argentine War of Independence; United Provinces of South America; Paraguay campaign; Army of the North; Jujuy Exodus; Battle of Tucumán; Battle of Salta; Battle of San Lorenzo; Army of the Andes; Argentine Declaration of Independence; Independence of Uruguay; Battle of Las Piedras; Second Banda Oriental campaign; Liga Federal; Independence of Paraguay Paraguay campaign; Bolivian War of Independence; War of the Republiquetas; Army of the North; First Upper Peru campaign; Second Upper Peru campaign; Third Upper Peru campaign	Patria Vieja; Patria Nueva; Chilean War of Independence; Battle of Rancagua; Battle of Chacabuco; Battle of Maipú; Capture of Valdivia; Peruvian War of Independence; Freedom Expedition of Perú; Battle of Junín; Battle of Ayacucho

=== Pro-independence ===
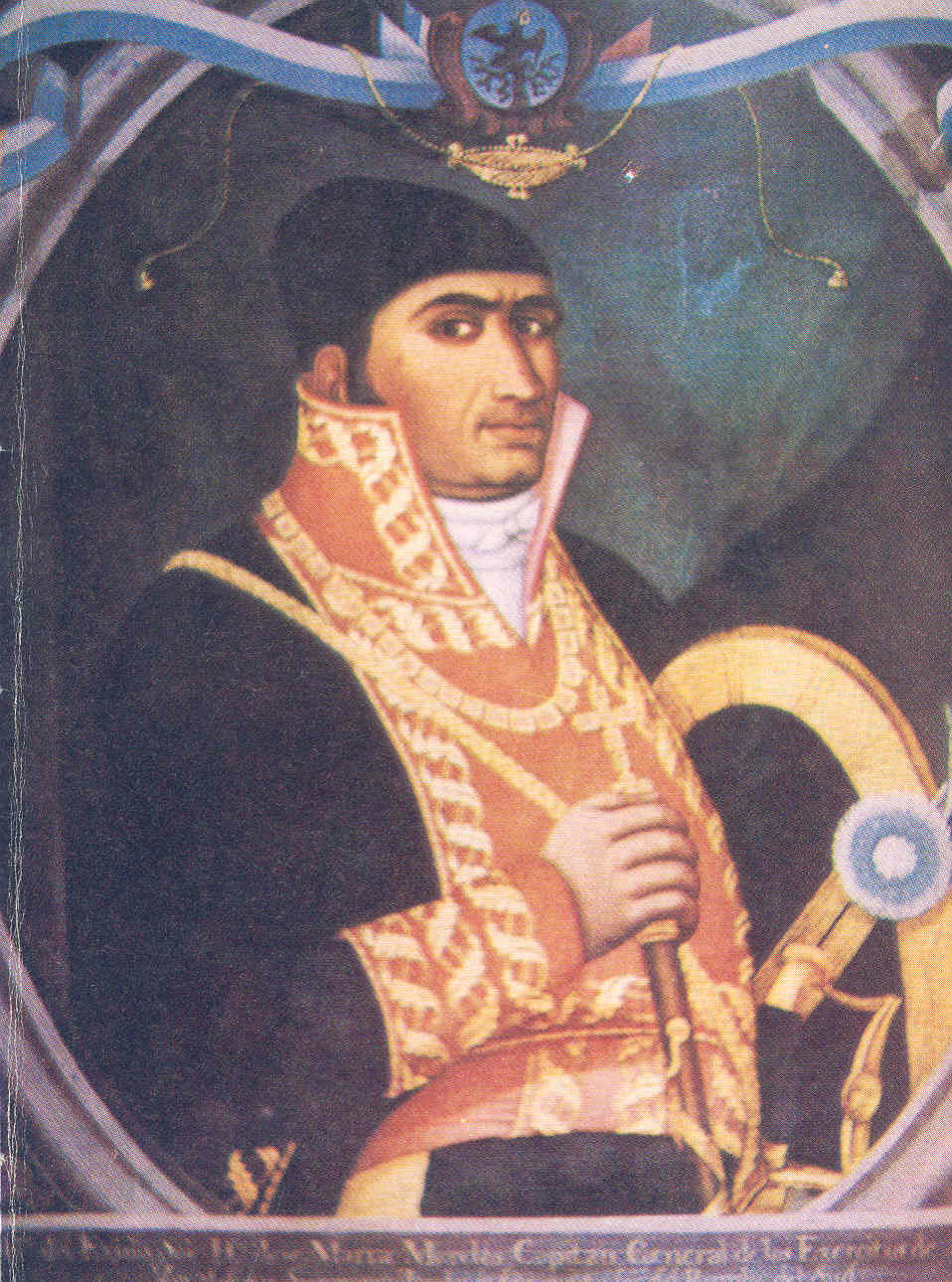
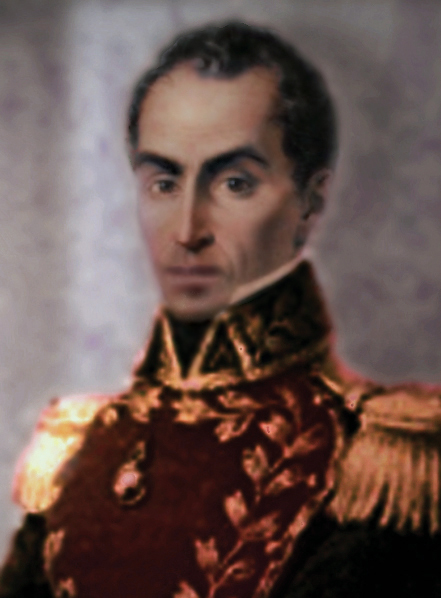
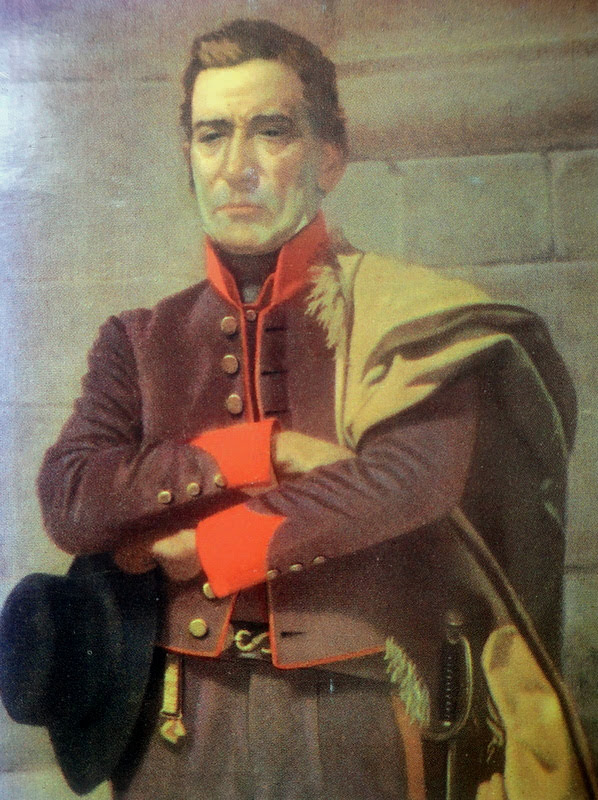
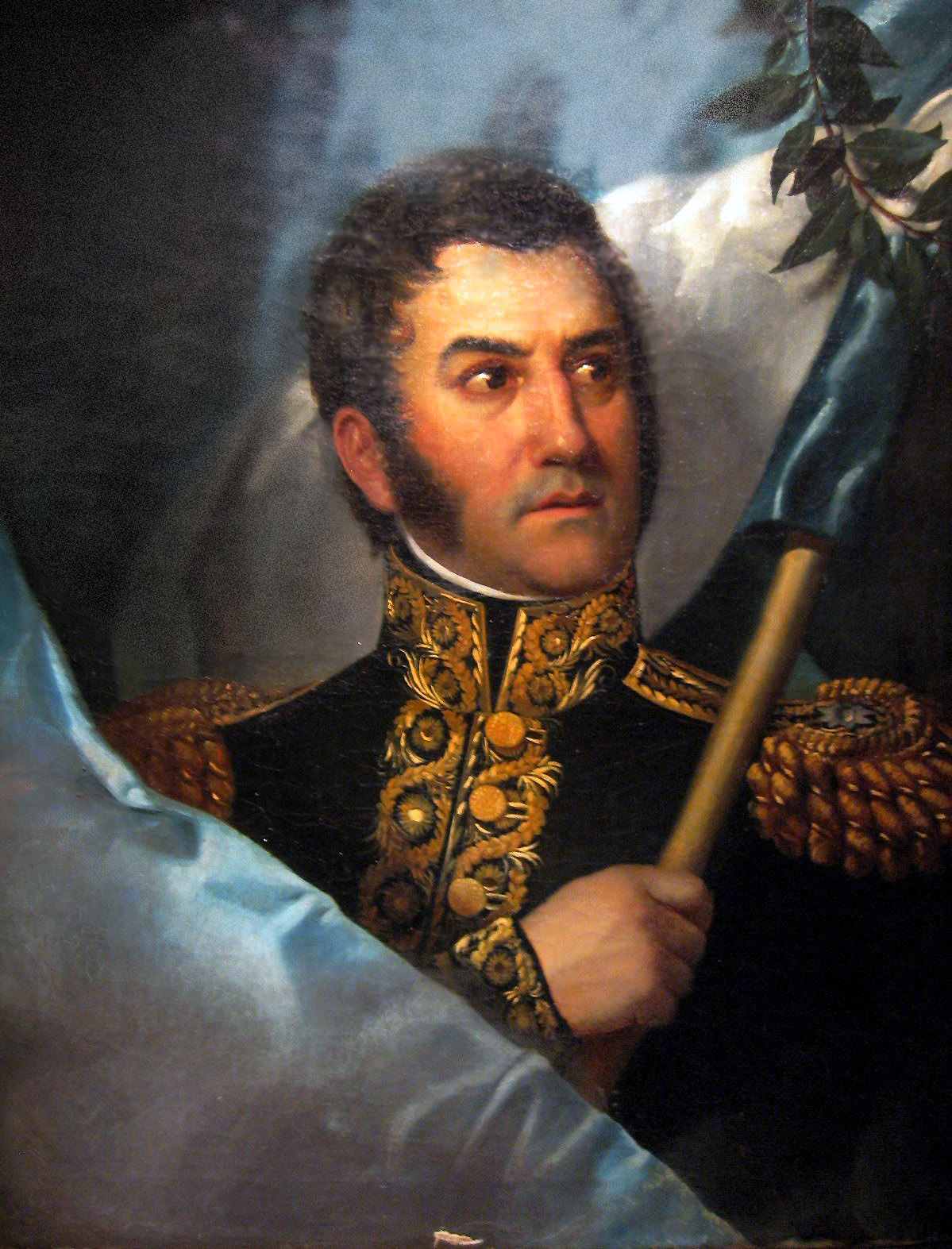
New Spain, Guatemala, Cuba & Puerto Rico José María Morelos	Venezuela, New Granada & Quito Simón Bolívar	Río de la Plata & Paraguay José Gervasio Artigas	Chile & Peru José de San Martín
Miguel Hidalgo y Costilla; Ignacio Allende; Juan Aldama; José María Morelos y Pavón; Ignacio López Rayón; Mariano Matamoros; Guadalupe Victoria; Vicente Guerrero; Agustín de Iturbide; Antonio Valero de Bernabé; José Matías Delgado	Francisco de Miranda; Simón Bolívar; Santiago Mariño; Rafael Urdaneta; José Félix Ribas; José Antonio Páez; Carlos Soublette; Manuel Piar; Luis Brión; Gregor MacGregor; Antonio José de Sucre; José Tadeo Monagas; Camilo Torres Tenorio; Antonio Nariño; Francisco de Paula Santander; José Prudencio Padilla; Eugenio Espejo; José Joaquín de Olmedo	José de San Martín; Mariano Moreno; Juan José Castelli; Manuel Belgrano; José Gervasio Artigas; José Gaspar Rodríguez de Francia; Fulgencio Yegros; Pedro Juan Caballero; Carlos María de Alvear; José Rondeau; Antonio González de Balcarce; Juan Martín de Pueyrredón; Martín Miguel de Güemes; Juana Azurduy de Padilla; William Brown	José de San Martín; Bernardo O'Higgins; José Miguel Carrera; Ramón Freire; José de la Riva Agüero; José Bernardo de Tagle; Ramón Castilla; Andrés de Santa Cruz; Juan Gregorio de las Heras

=== Royalists ===
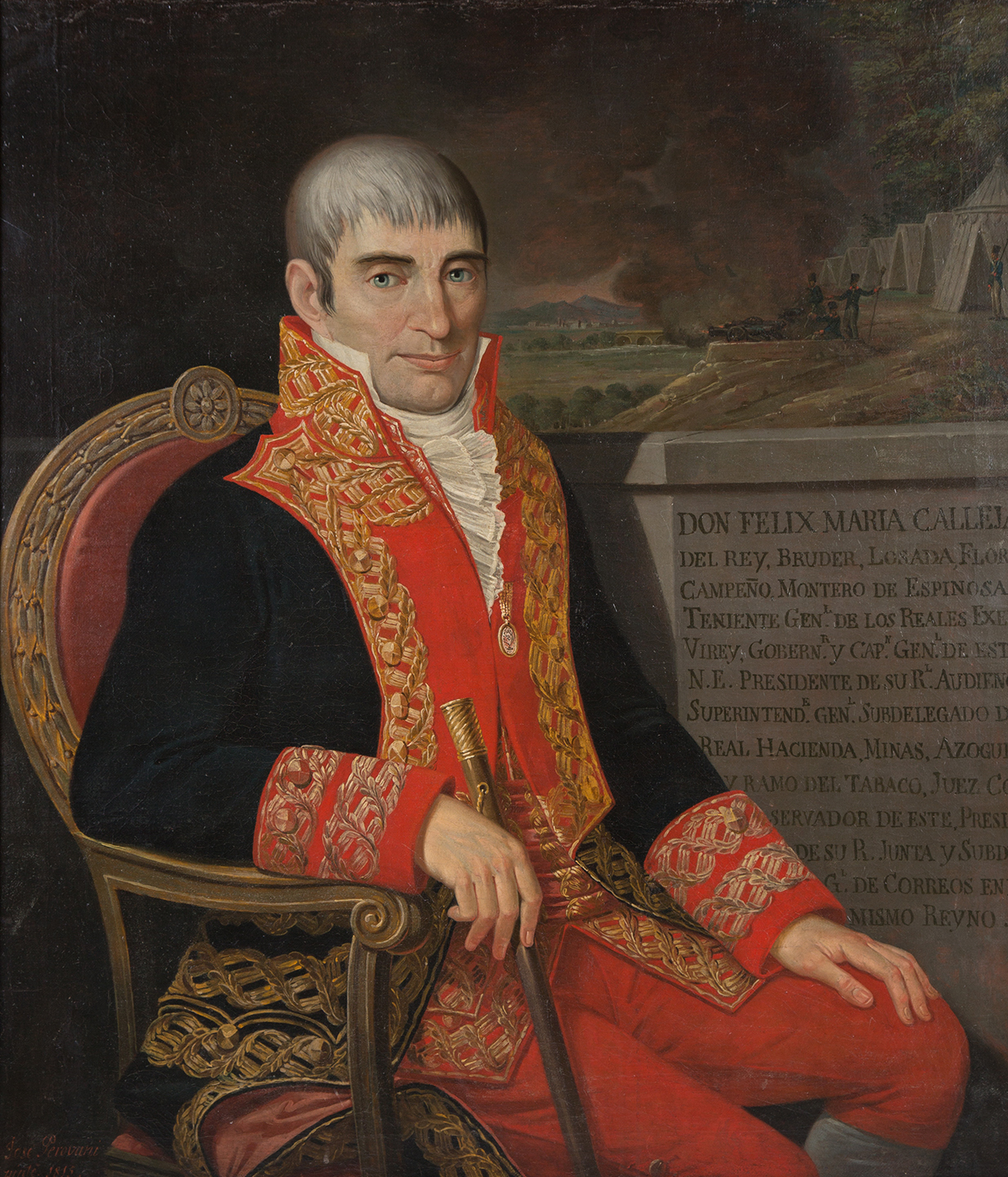
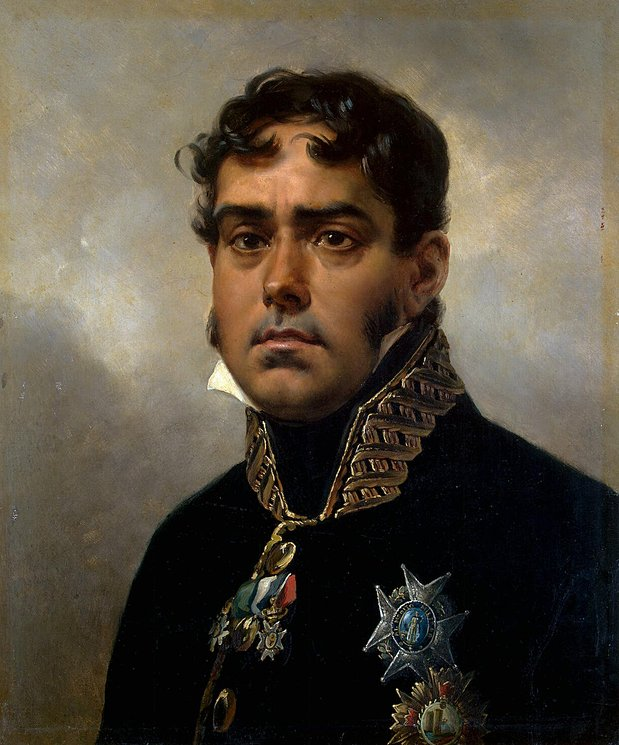
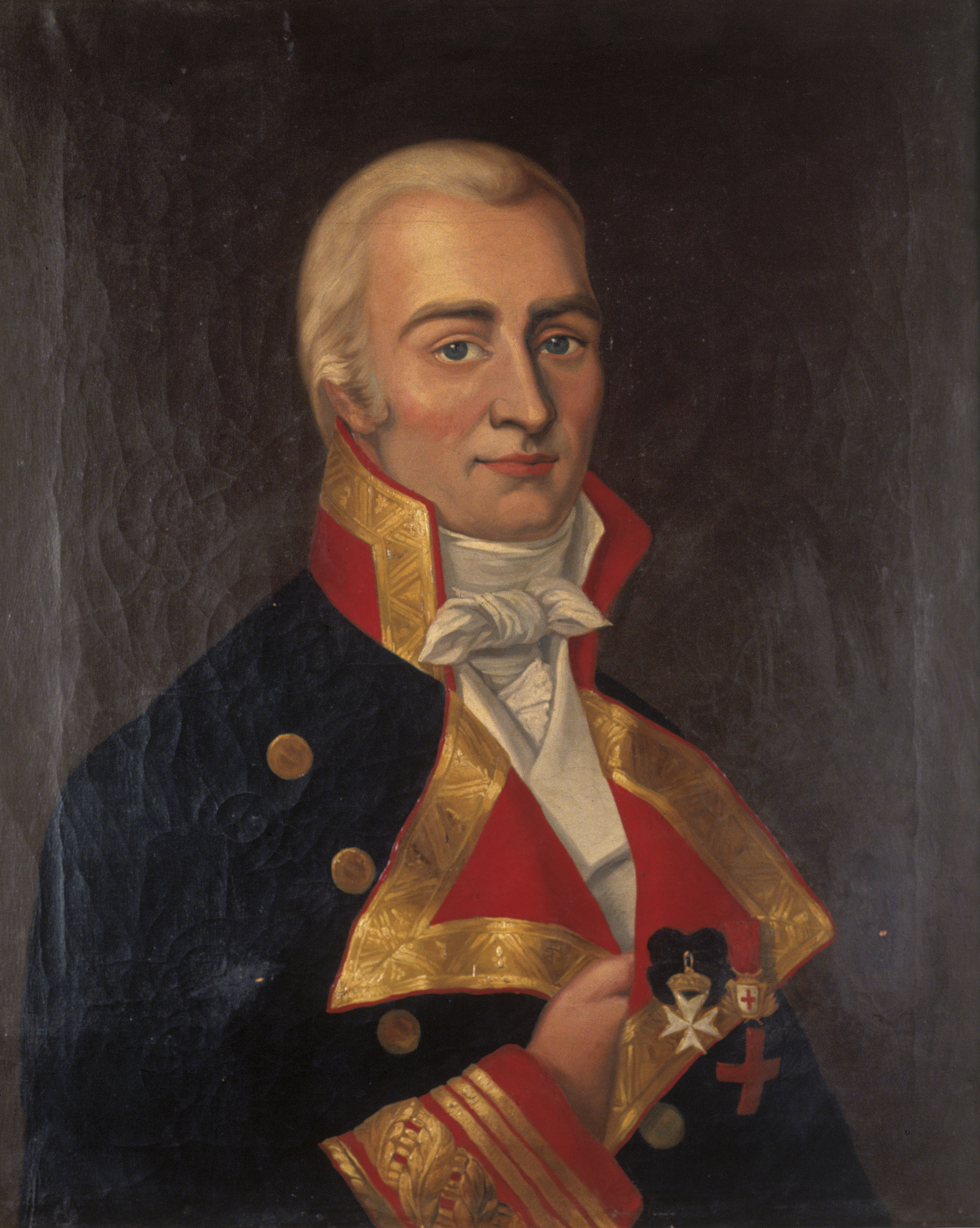
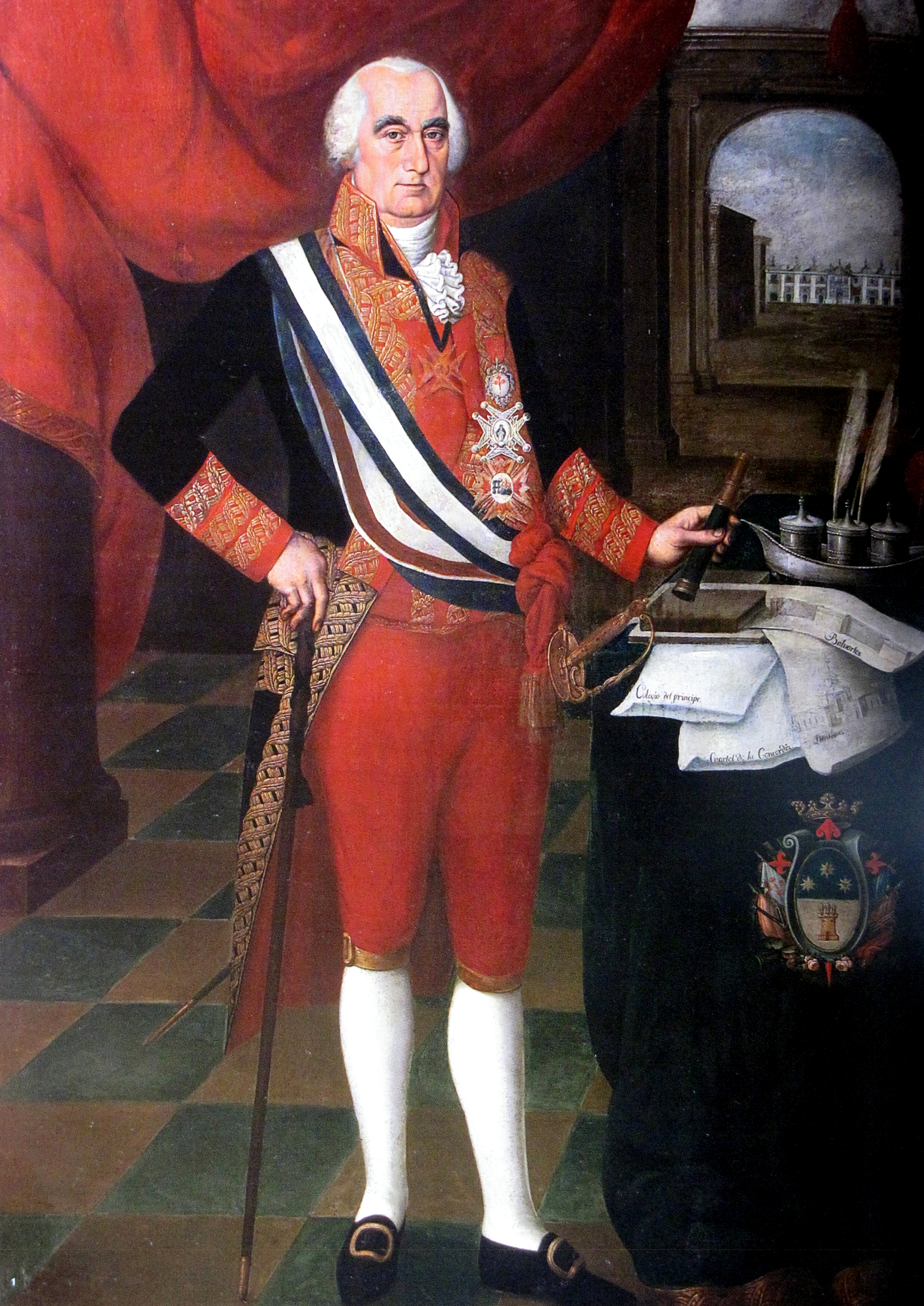
New Spain, Guatemala, Cuba & Puerto Rico Félix María Calleja del Rey, 1st Count of Calderón	New Granada, Venezuela & Quito Pablo Morillo	Río de la Plata, Montevideo & Paraguay Santiago de Liniers, 1st Count of Buenos Aires	Chile, Peru & Upper Peru José Fernando de Abascal y Sousa
José de Iturrigaray; Gabriel J. de Yermo; Francisco Javier Venegas; Félix María Calleja del Rey; Juan Ruiz de Apodaca; Juan O'Donojú; Torcuato Trujillo; Isidro Barradas; José de Bustamante y Guerra; Ángel Laborde	Fernando Miyares y Gonzáles; Domingo de Monteverde; José Tomás Boves; Juan Manuel Cajigal; Pablo Morillo; Juan de los Reyes Vargas; Francisco Montalvo; Juan de Sámano, Viceroy of New Granada; Miguel de la Torre y Pando; Francisco Tomás Morales; Sebastián de la Calzada; José María Barreiro Manjón; Melchor Aymerich, President of the Quito Audiencia; José de Canterac; Basilio Modesto García, Colonel; Agustín Agualongo	Francisco Javier de Elío; Gaspar de Vigodet; Bernardo de Velasco; Santiago de Liniers y Bremond; Vicente Nieto, President of the Charcas Audiencia	José Fernando de Abascal y Sousa; José Manuel de Goyeneche; Pío Tristán; Joaquín de la Pezuela; Pedro Antonio Olañeta; José de la Serna e Hinojosa; José de Canterac; Jerónimo Valdés; José Ramón Rodil y Campillo; Vicente Benavides; Antonio Pareja; Juan Francisco Sánchez; Gabino Gaínza; Mariano Osorio; José Ordóñez; Rafael Maroto; Casimiro Marcó del Pont; Antonio de Quintanilla

== See also ==
- Age of Revolution
- British Legions
- List of foreign volunteers
- Insurgent privateer
- Philippine Revolution
- Spanish reconquest of Mexico
- Patriot
- Royalist
- Wars of national liberation
- List of wars of independence
- History of South America
- History of Mexico
- New Spain
- Spanish East Indies
- Decolonization of the Americas
- Timeline of the Spanish American wars of independence
- Timeline of Mexican War of Independence
- Panhispanism
- Argentine War of Independence
- Brazilian War of Independence
- Campaigns of the South
- History of Spain (1808–1874)
- Mexican War of Independence

== Notes ==
1. First invasion of the Banda Oriental by the Portuguese army led by Diogo de Sousa in 1811 to annex the territory, which during the colonial period was disputed between Spain and Portugal. Not to destroy the independent government of Buenos Aires. In 1816 he invaded the Banda Oriental again and conquered it after a coast guard military campaign that lasted until 1820.
2. Consolidation stage is a broad, diffuse, confusing and different period for each independent country. Various states were formed at the beginning of the war, went through different processes that changed them politically. This was due to reasons such as the overthrow of the government by the royalists and their subsequent restoration (for example, Chile and Venezuela), and also by the union of independent states that came to form a new political entity (Gran Colombia and the Mexican Empire).
3. Unrecognized states emerged during the wars of independence: Chile, Gran Colombia, and the Mexican Empire; Paraguay seceded from the United Provinces of the Río de la Plata, while Bolivia emerged from both the Río de la Plata and Peru and was proposed as part of the Bolivarian Federation of the Andes.
4. Mexico in its consolidation stage was organized as an empire from 1821 to 1823. When the empire was dissolved, Mexico was reorganized as a republic and the Central American territories that were part of the empire were reorganized into a new political entity called the United Provinces of Central America.
5. Spain's Royal Army also was in the Mexican side, because the royalist criollo Colonel Agustín de Iturbide that joined the pro-independence side.
6. During the course of the war, the United Provinces organized three land forces that fought on different fronts and periods: the army that confronted the royalists of Montevideo, the Army of the North and the Army of the Andes. In the maritime area, the government organized a naval force in 1811, which was destroyed in battle in that same year, so in 1813 it organized a second naval force that was operative until the decisive victory obtained in 1814. It then used corsairs in the sea until the end of the war.
7. In 1817, after the triumph of the independents in Chacabuco and the subsequent restoration of the Chilean government, the Chilean Army was again organized, which fought along with the Army of the Andes in the center-south zone of Chile. Later, both armies would form the Liberating Expedition of Peru, although a part of the Chilean force remained fighting in the country until its territorial consolidation. As for the maritime area, between 1817 and 1818 the Chilean Navy (First Chilean Navy Squadron) was founded and would operate until the end of the war. Between 1817 and 1820, Chile also used corsairs in the sea.
8. In its consolidation phase, the Mexican government had as a land force the so-called Army of the Three Guarantees, while to fight in the sea it founded the Mexican Navy.
9. British and German veterans of the Napoleonic Wars recruited in the United Kingdom—together with a minority of non-veteran local recruits, as well as other volunteers and mercenaries. Supply and sale of warships, weapons and ammunition.
10. guerrillas or violent rebellions in many countries
11. under flags of many belligerents
12. The First Texas Independence, 1813. The green flag is the first flag of Texas independence.
13. Republic of West Florida annexation (1810) and Rebellion of Republic of East Florida (1812).
14. Insurgent privateers using many flags.
15. diplomatic declaration exclusively.
