= Insurgent privateers =

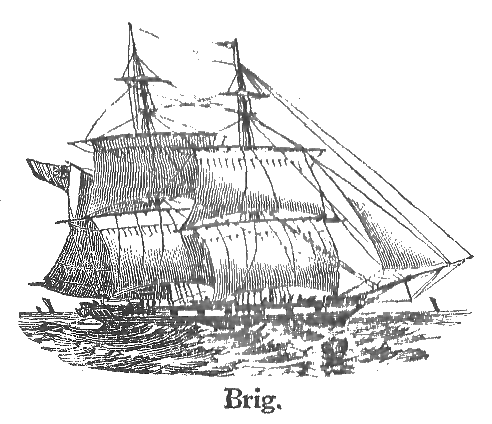
Brig

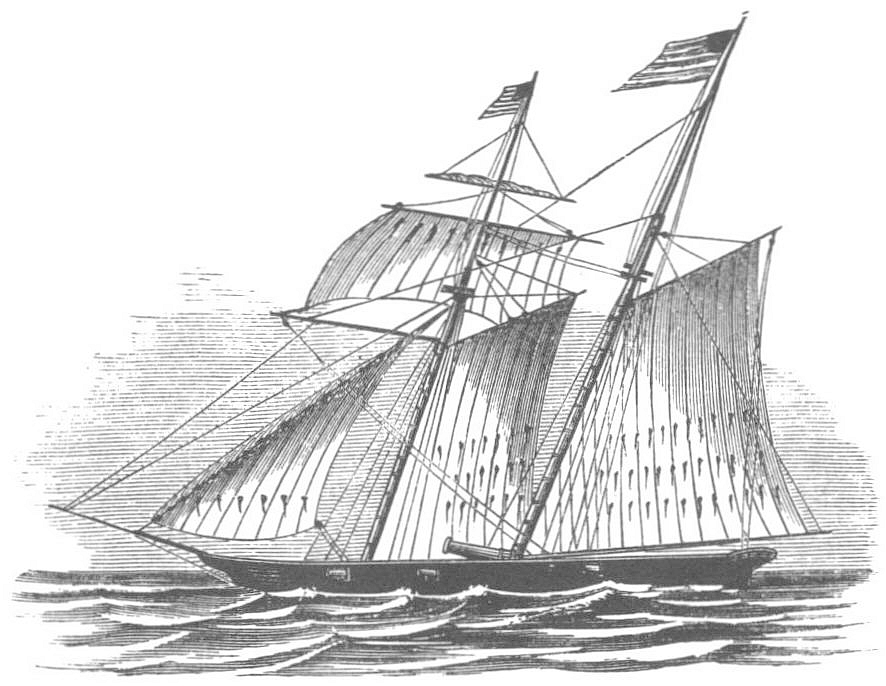
Schooner

Insurgent privateers (Spanish: corsarios insurgentes) were private armed vessels recruited by the insurgent governments during the Spanish American wars of independence to destroy Spanish trade and capture Spanish merchant vessels.

Privateering started early in the war in 1812, but large scale deployment of warships started between 1816 and 1821, most notably under the flag of Buenos Aires and flag of Artigas. Between 1821 and 1829 these privateers sailed under the flags of Mexico and Colombia (privateers coming from Cartagena, Colombia, were referred to as "Carthaginians"). The main motivation of these insurgent privateers were to earn money but their political motivation was scant. They captured merchant vessels and slave ships to seize loot but they refused to fight against the Spanish Navy.

After the War of 1812 privately armed vessels came from North America, mostly from Baltimore. More than one hundred ships set sail from the United States, with more than three thousand American sailors and captains to fight as insurgent privateers. There were also shipowners of other nationalities involved, such as French and British. These vessels were fast namely schooners or brigs, typically armed with twelve to sixteen guns, consisting of either twelve or twenty four lb caliber.

Cádiz was the principal port targeted, but there were other ports in the Iberian Peninsula and the Canary Islands that were also threatened. The second most important port was La Habana, in Cuba where Spanish trade with the Americas suffered considerable damage. The most important factor for reduction of Spanish commerce was not privateer attacks but loss of ports and new territories gained by republican countries.

The UK merchant fleet arrived from the Americas amounted to the fifteen percent of the total of their global commerce. British trade with Latin America was not totally legal but it was tolerated as they were an allied power in the Napoleonic Wars and later, with the mediation of the UK, in the Latin American wars. The Royal Navy tried to protect their trade without interfering in the local conflicts of independence. The US Government turned a blind eye to North American privateers, and tried to force Spain to accelerate the cession of Florida (Adams–Onís Treaty), nevertheless they took firm measures to terminate privateering after the end of the war, in 1829.

== See also ==
- List of ships under Chilean Letter of marque
- Spanish American wars of independence

== Bibliography ==
- Gámez Duarte, Feliciano (2004). "El desafío insurgente, análisis del corso hispanoamericano desde una perspectiva peninsular, 1812-1828". Ph.D. Dissertation. University of Cádiz: 632.
- Head, David (August 2015). Privateers of the Americas: Spanish American Privateering from the United States in the Early Republic. Athens: University of Georgia Press. p. 224.
- McCarthy, Matthew (2011). "'A Sure Defence against the Foe'? Maritime Predation & British Commercial Policy during the Spanish American Wars of Independence, 1810-1830". Ph.D. Dissertation. University of Hull: 277.
- Pérez Morales, Edgardo (2012). El gran diablo hecho barco, Corsarios, esclavos y revolución en Cartagena y el Gran Caribe, 1791-1817. Bucaramanga: Universidad Industrial de Santander. p. 292.
- Terrien, Nicolas (May 2015). "Des patriotes sans patrie", Histoire des corsaires insurgés de l'Amérique espagnole (1810-1825). Rennes: Les Perséides. p. 384.
