= List of Argentine War of Independence battles =

This is a chronological list of military actions in the Argentine War of Independence. Although achieving full independence was not the declared goal at first, the terms patriots and royalists are used since they are the most common names, identifying the ones who responded to the governments of Buenos Aires or their own governments and those who were loyal to the Council of Regency of Spain and the Indies respectively.

Battle	Campaign	Date	Current location	Outcome
Battle of Cotagaita	1st Upper Peru campaign	27 October 1810	Santiago de Cotagaita, Bolivia	Royalist victory
Battle of Suipacha	1st Upper Peru campaign	7 November 1810	Suipacha, Bolivia	Patriot victory
Battle of Aroma	Revolution of Cochabamba	15 November 1810	Aroma Province, Bolivia	Patriot victory
Battle of Campichuelo	Paraguay campaign	19 December 1810	Paso de Campichuelo, Bolivia	Patriot victory
Battle of Maracaná	Paraguay campaign	6 January 1811	Paraguay	Patriot victory
Battle of Paraguarí	Paraguay campaign	19 January 1811	Paraguarí, Paraguay	Royalist victory
Battle of San Nicolás	Defence of the Littoral	2 March 1811	San Nicolás de los Arroyos, Argentina	Royalist victory
Battle of Tacuarí	Paraguay campaign	9 March 1811	Carmen del Paraná, Paraguay	Royalist victory
Battle of Soriano	1st Banda Oriental campaign	4 April 1811	Santo Domingo Soriano, Uruguay	Patriot victory
Skirmish of Huaqui	1st Upper Peru campaign	11 April 1811	Guaqui, Bolivia	Royalist victory
Battle of San José	1st Banda Oriental campaign	26 April 1811	San José de Mayo, Uruguay	Patriot victory
Battle of Chiviraya	1st Upper Peru campaign	3 May 1811	Taipy Chirivaya, Bolivia	Patriot victory
Battle of Las Piedras	1st Banda Oriental campaign	18 May 1811	Las Piedras, Uruguay	Patriot victory
Battle of the Cordón	1st Banda Oriental campaign	4 June 1811	Montevideo, Uruguay	Patriot victory
Battle of Yuraicoragua	1st Upper Peru campaign	6 June 1811	Taipy Chirivaya, Bolivia	Patriot victory
Battle of Huaqui	1st Upper Peru campaign	20 June 1811	Guaqui, Bolivia	Royalist victory
Assault of the Isla de las Ratas	1st Banda Oriental campaign	15 July 1811	Isla de las Ratas, Uruguay	Patriot victory
Bombing of Corrientes	Defence of the Littoral	23 July 1811	Corrientes, Argentina	Patriot victory
Battle of Sipe Sipe	1st Upper Peru campaign	13 August 1811	Cochabamba, Bolivia	Royalist victory
Battle of Sansana	1st Upper Peru campaign	17 December 1811	Sansana, Bolivia	Patriot victory
Battle of Nazareno	1st Upper Peru campaign	12 January 1812	Nazareno, Bolivia	Royalist victory
Battle of Tarija	Revolution of Tarija	8 February 1812	Tarija, Bolivia	Patriot victory
Battle of the Rincón	Defence of the Littoral	8 May 1812	La Guardia, Argentina	Patriot victory
Battle of Pocona	Revolution of Cochabamba	24 May 1812	Pocona, Bolivia	Royalist victory
Capture of Paraguayan ships	Defence of the Littoral	31 July 1812	Paraná River, Argentina	Royalist victory
Battle of Paraná River	Defence of the Littoral	4 August 1812	Paraná River, Argentina	Patriot victory
Battle of Cobos	Defence of the North	26 August 1812	Fuerte de Cobos, Argentina	Royalist victory
Skirmish of Las Piedras	Defence of the North	3 September 1812	Las Piedras River, Argentina	Patriot victory
Battle of Tucumán	Defence of the North	24 September 1812	San Miguel de Tucumán, Argentina	Patriot victory
2nd Skirmish of Las Piedras	Defence of the North	30 September 1812	Las Piedras River, Argentina	Patriot victory
Atack on Jujuy	Defence of the North	8 October 1812	San Salvador de Jujuy, Argentina	Royalist victory
Sack of San Nicolás de los Arroyos	Defence of the Littoral	9 October 1812	San Nicolás de los Arroyos, Argentina	Royalist victory
Battle of Miguelete	2nd Banda Oriental campaign	1 November 1812	Montevideo, Uruguay	Patriot victory
2nd Battle of the Cordón	2nd Banda Oriental campaign	1 November 1812	Montevideo, Uruguay	Patriot victory
Atack on the Santa Lucía Saladero	2nd Banda Oriental campaign	16 December 1812	Santa Lucía River, Uruguay	Patriot victory
Battle of Cerrito	2nd Banda Oriental campaign	31 December 1812	Montevideo, Uruguay	Patriot victory
Battle of El Bellaco Creek	Defence of the Littoral	14 January 1813	Bellaco Creek, Argentina	Patriot victory
Battle of San Lorenzo	Defence of the Littoral	3 February 1813	San Lorenzo, Argentina	Patriot victory
Battle of the Paranacito	Defence of the Littoral	8 February 1813	Ibicuy Islands, Argentina	Patriot victory
Battle of Salta	Defence of the North	20 February 1813	Salta, Argentina	Patriot victory
Seizure of ships at Concepción	Defence of the Littoral	24 February 1813	Concepción del Uruguay, Uruguay	Patriot victory
Battle of Pequereque	2nd Upper Peru campaign	19 June 1813	Oruro Department, Bolivia	Patriot victory
Capture of Martín García	2nd Banda Oriental campaign	7 July 1813	Martín García Island, Argentina	Patriot victory
Battle of the Rincón de Zárate	Defence of the Littoral	23 August 1813	Zárate, Argentina	Patriot victory
Battle of Ancacato	Republiquetas	27 September 1813	Ancacato, Bolivia	Royalist victory
Battle of Vilcapugio	2nd Upper Peru campaign	1 October 1813	Vilcapugio, Bolivia	Royalist victory
Action of Tambo Nuevo	2nd Upper Peru campaign	25 October 1813	Porco, Bolivia	Patriot victory
Battle of Ayohuma	2nd Upper Peru campaign	14 November 1813	Ayohuma, Bolivia	Royalist victory
Naval Battle of Hornos	2nd Banda Oriental campaign	9 January 1814	Río de la Plata, Uruguay	Patriot victory
2nd Battle of the Paranacito	Defence of the Littoral	10 January 1814	Ibicuy Islands, Argentina	Patriot victory
Battle of San Pedro	Revolution of Santa Cruz	4 February 1814	Vallegrande, Bolivia	Royalist victory
Battle of Cucha Cucha	Argentine Auxiliaries in Chile	23 February 1814	Portezuelo, Chile	Patriot victory
Battle of Tarvita	Republiquetas	4 March 1814	Tarvita, Bolivia	Patriot victory
Battle of Martín García	2nd Banda Oriental campaign	10–17 March 1814	Martín García Island, Uruguay	Patriot victory
Battle of San Bernardo	Defence of the North	18 March 1814	Salta Province, Argentina	Patriot victory
Battle of Membrillar	Argentine Auxiliaries in Chile	20 March 1814	Portezuelo, Chile	Patriot victory
Battle of Sauce Redondo	Defence of the North	24 March 1814	Salta, Argentina	Patriot victory
Battle of Arroyo de la China	Defence of the Littoral	28 March 1814	Uruguay River, Uruguay	Royalist victory
Battle of Juncal de Verde	Defence of the North	29 March 1814	Salta, Argentina	Patriot victory
Battle of the Horcas	Revolution of Santa Cruz	11 April 1814	Santa Cruz de la Sierra, Bolivia	Royalist victory
Battle of Buceo	2nd Banda Oriental campaign	14–17 May 1814	Río de la Plata, Uruguay	Patriot victory
Battle of La Florida	Revolution of Santa Cruz	25 May 1814	Cordillera Province, Bolivia	Patriot victory
Battle of the Campo Santo of Postrervalle	Revolution of Santa Cruz	4 July 1814	Postrervalle, Bolivia	Patriot victory
Battle of Pilaya	Republiquetas	20 July 1814	Pilaya, Bolivia	Royalist victory
Battle of Samaipata	Revolution of Santa Cruz	6 August 1814	Samaipata, Bolivia	Royalist victory
Battle of Barrios	3rd Upper Peru campaign	11 October 1814	Barrios, Argentina	Patriot victory
Battle of Puna	Republiquetas	8 January 1815	Puna, Bolivia	Royalist victory
Battle of Presto	Republiquetas	January 1815	Presto, Bolivia	Patriot victory
Battle of Santa Elena	Republiquetas	6 February 1815	Santa Elena, Bolivia	Royalist victory
Battle of El Tejar	Defence of the North	19 February 1815	El Tejar, Argentina	Royalist victory
Battle of Puesto del Marqués	Gaucho War, Defence of the North	17 April 1815	Puesto del Marqués, Argentina	Patriot victory
Battle of Santa Bárbara	Revolution of Santa Cruz	7 October 1815	Santa Bárbara, Bolivia	Patriot victory
Battle of Venta y Media	3rd Upper Peru campaign	21 October 1815	Oruro Department, Bolivia	Royalist victory
Battle of Viluma	3rd Upper Peru campaign	29 November 1815	Cochabamba, Bolivia	Royalist victory
Battle of Salo	3rd Upper Peru campaign	January 1816	Salo, Bolivia	Royalist victory
Battle of Callao	Peruvian War of Independence	20 and 24 January 1816	Callao, Peru	Patriot victory
Battle of Culpina	3rd Upper Peru campaign	31 January 1816	Culpina, Bolivia	Patriot victory
Battle of Uturango	3rd Upper Peru campaign	2 February 1816	Uturango Gorge, Bolivia	Patriot victory
Battle of Cinti	Republiquetas	2–3 February 1816	Cinti, Bolivia	Patriot victory
Atack on Punta de Piedras	Privateers	8 February 1816	Guayas River, Ecuador	Patriot victory
Naval Battle of Guayaquil	Privateers	9 February 1816	Guayas River, Ecuador	Royalist victory
Battle of San Juan	3rd Upper Peru campaign	12 February 1816	San Juan River, Bolivia	Patriot victory
Battle of Mojo	3rd Upper Peru campaign	24 February 1816	Mojo, Bolivia	Royalist victory
Battle of Cololó	Republiquetas	27 February 1816	Cololó Mountain Range, Bolivia	Royalist victory
Battle of the Villar	Republiquetas	3 March 1816	Villar, Bolivia	Patriot victory
Battle of La Laguna	Republiquetas	3 March 1816	La Laguna, Bolivia	Patriot victory
Battle of Juncalito	Chilean War of Independence	10 March 1816	Uspallata Pass, Chile	Patriot victory
Battle of Tarabuco	3rd Upper Peru campaign	12 March 1816	Tarabuco, Bolivia	Patriot victory
Battle of Aucapuñima	Republiquetas	26 March 1816	Cinti, Bolivia	Royalist victory
Battle of Arpaja	Republiquetas	3 April 1816	Villa Charcas, Bolivia	Royalist victory
Battle of Chuquisaca (1816)	Republiquetas	28 May 1816	Sucre, Bolivia	Royalist victory
Atack on Chuquisaca	Republiquetas	11 July 1816	Cinti, Bolivia	Royalist victory
2nd Battle of La Laguna	Republiquetas	13 September 1816	La Laguna, Bolivia	Royalist victory
2nd Battle of the Villar	Republiquetas	14 September 1816	La Laguna, Bolivia	Royalist victory
Battle of Colpayo	Defence of the North	16 September 1816	Abra Pampa, Argentina	Patriot victory
Battle of Santa Victoria	Defence of the North	24 September 1816	Santa Victoria, Argentina	Patriot victory
Battle of Guerra Guaico	Gaucho War	16 October 1816	Guerra Guaico, Bolivia	Royalist victory
Battle of Yavi	Gaucho War, Defence of the North	15 November 1816	Yavi, Bolivia	Royalist victory
Battle of Cachimayo	Republiquetas	16 November 1816	Cinti, Bolivia	Royalist victory
Battle of El Pari	Revolution of Santa Cruz	21 November 1816	Santa Cruz de la Sierra, Bolivia	Royalist victory
Battle of Cumpeo	Chilean War of Independence	4 January 1817	Somewhere near Talca, Chile	Patriot victory
Battle of Río Negro	Defence of the North	20 January 1817	Abra de Zenta, Argentina	Patriot victory
Action of Picheuta	Chilean War of Independence	24 January 1817	Picheuta, Argentina	Royalist victory
Battle of Potrerillos	Chilean War of Independence	24 January 1817	Potrerillos Dam, Argentina	Royalist victory
Batle of Achupallas	Chilean War of Independence	4 February 1817	Putaendo, Chile	Patriot victory
Battle of the Vega de Cumpeo	Chilean War of Independence	4 February 1817	Cumpeo, Chile	Patriot victory
Battle of Guardia Vieja	Chilean War of Independence	4 February 1817	Guardia Vieja, Chile	Patriot victory
Battle of San Pedrito	Defence of the North	6 February 1817	San Pedrito, Argentina	Patriot victory
Battle of Las Coimas	Chilean War of Independence	7 February 1817	Las Coimas, Chile	Patriot victory
Battle of Barraza	Chilean War of Independence	11 February 1817	Barraza, Chile	Patriot victory
Battle of Salala	Chilean War of Independence	12 February 1817	Salala, Chile	Patriot victory
Battle of Chacabuco	Chilean War of Independence	12 February 1817	Chacabuco Estate, Chile	Patriot victory
Battle of Huasco	Chilean War of Independence	16 February 1817	Huasco, Chile	Patriot victory
Battle of Humahuaca	Defence of the North	1 March 1817	Humahuaca, Argentina	Patriot victory
Battle of Severino	Defence of the North	5 March 1817	Jujuy Province, Argentina	Patriot victory
Battle of Vangue	Defence of the North	13 March 1817	Jujuy Province, Argentina	Patriot victory
Battle of Jujuy	Defence of the North	12–15 March 1817	San Salvador de Jujuy, Argentina	Royalist victory
3rd Battle of La Laguna	Republiquetas	15 March 1817	La Laguna, Bolivia	Patriot victory
Battle of Garzas	4th Upper Peru campaign	19 March 1817	La Laguna, Bolivia	Royalist victory
Battle of Volcán	Gaucho War	3 April 1817	Volcán, Argentina	Patriot victory
Battle of Palpalá	Defence of the North	4 April 1817	Palpalá, Argentina	Royalist victory
Battle of Curapalihue	Chilean War of Independence	5 April 1817	Concepción, Chile	Patriot victory
Battle of the Tablada de Tolomosa	Revolution of Tarija	14–15 April 1817	Tarija, Bolivia	Patriot victory
Battle of the Bañado	Gaucho War	21 and 24 April 1817	Chicona, Argentina	Patriot victory
Battle of Cerro Gavilán	Chilean War of Independence	5 May 1817	Concepción, Chile	Patriot victory
Battle of Nacimiento	Chilean War of Independence	12 May 1817	Nacimiento, Chile	Patriot victory
Battle of the Altos de Quintana	Defence of the North	15 May 1817	Salta, Argentina	Patriot victory
2nd Battle of Cachimayo	4th Upper Peru campaign	20 May 1817	Sucre, Bolivia	Patriot victory
2nd Battle of Chuquisaca	4th Upper Peru campaign	21 May 1817	Sucre, Bolivia	Royalist victory
Battle of Yamparáez	4th Upper Peru campaign	22 May 1817	Yamparáez, Bolivia	Royalist victory
Battle of Carampangue	Chilean War of Independence	27 May 1817	Carampangue, Chile	Patriot victory
Battle of Sopachuy	4th Upper Peru campaign	12 June 1817	Sopachuy, Bolivia	Royalist victory
1st Battle of Padcaya	Revolution of Tarija, Gaucho War	14 July 1817	Padcaya, Bolivia	Royalist victory
Battle of Manzano	Chilean War of Independence	10 September 1817	Talcahuano, Chile	Patriot victory
Battle of Tubul	Chilean War of Independence	27 September 1817	Tubul River, Chile	Patriot victory
Assault of Talcahuano	Chilean War of Independence	6 December 1817	Talcahuano, Chile	Patriot victory
Battle of Río de Reyes	Gaucho War	13 January 1818	Yala, Argentina	Royalist victory
Battle of Hornillos	Gaucho War	26 January 1818	Hornillos Post Station, Argentina	Royalist victory
Battle of Casabindo	Gaucho War	27 January 1818	Casabindo, Argentina	Royalist victory
Battle of Acoyte	Gaucho War	11 February 1818	Acoyte, Argentina	Patriot victory
2nd Battle of Padcaya	Revolution of Tarija, Gaucho War	March 1818	Padcaya, Bolivia	Royalist victory
Battle of Quechereguas	Chilean War of Independence	15 March 1818	Molina, Chile	Royalist victory
Battle of Talca	Chilean War of Independence	18 March 1818	Talca, Chile	Royalist victory
Battle of Cancha Rayada	Chilean War of Independence	18 March 1818	Talca, Chile	Royalist victory
Battle of Requínoa	Chilean War of Independence	30 March 1818	Requínoa, Chile	Patriot victory
Battle of Maipú	Chilean War of Independence	5 April 1818	Lo Espejo, Chile	Patriot victory
Battle of Realejo	Privateers	5 April 1818	Realejo, Philippines	Patriot victory
Battle of Puerto de Santa Cruz	Privateers	10 April 1818	Puerto de Santa Cruz, Philippines	Patriot victory
Battle of Valparaíso	Chilean War of Independence	27 April 1818	Valparaíso, Chile	Patriot victory
Battle of Salinas	Revolution of Tarija, Gaucho War	29 April–2 May 1818	O'Connor, Bolivia	Patriot victory
Battle of las Salinas	Revolution of Tarija, Gaucho War	18 May 1818	O'Connor, Bolivia	Patriot victory
Battle of Parral	Chilean War of Independence	27 May 1818	Pareal, Chile	Patriot victory
Battle of Quirihue	Chilean War of Independence	31 May 1818	Quirihue, Chile	Patriot victory
Battle of Chillán	Chilean War of Independence	31 July 1818	Chillán, Chile	Patriot victory
Battle of Talcahuano	Chilean War of Independence	28 October 1818	Talcahuano, Chile	Patriot victory
Battle of Biray	Revolution of Tarija, Gaucho War	30 November 1818	Caraparí, Bolivia	Patriot victory
Battle of Biobío	Chilean War of Independence	19 January 1819	Biobío River, Chile	Patriot victory
Battle of Huacalera	Gaucho War	3 April 1819	Huacalera, Argentina	Royalist victory
Battle of Chamical	Defence of the North	2 June 1820	Cerrillos, Argentina	Royalist victory
Battle of Palpa	Peruvian War of Independence	7 October 1820	Palpa, Peru	Patriot victory
Battle of Nazca	Peruvian War of Independence	15 October 1820	Nazca, Peru	Patriot victory
Battle of Acarí	Peruvian War of Independence	16 October 1820	Acarí, Peru	Patriot victory
Battle of Cangallo	Peruvian War of Independence	29 October 1820	Cangallo, Peru	Patriot victory
Battle of Torre Blanca	Peruvian War of Independence	11 November 1820	Ancón District, Peru	Patriot victory
Battle of Mayoc	Peruvian War of Independence	11 November 1820	Mantaro River, Peru	Patriot victory
Battle of Jauja	Peruvian War of Independence	20 November 1820	Jauja, Peru	Patriot victory
Battle of Tarma	Peruvian War of Independence	23 November 1820	Tarma, Peru	Patriot victory
Battle of Chancay	Peruvian War of Independence	27 November 1820	Caleta Pescadores, Peru	Royalist victory
Battle of Cerro de Pasco	Peruvian War of Independence	6 December 1820	Cerro de Pasco, Peru	Patriot victory
Battle of Huancayo	Peruvian War of Independence	29 December 1820	Huancayo, Peru	Royalist victory
Battle of León	Gaucho War	27 April 1821	León, Argentina	Patriot victory
Battle of Mirave	Peruvian War of Independence	22 May 1821	Mirve, Peru	Patriot victory
Battle of Moquegua	Peruvian War of Independence	24 May 1821	Moquegua, Peru	Patriot victory
2nd Battle of Salta	Gaucho War	7 July 1821	Salta, Argentina	Royalist victory
Assault of Callao	Peruvian War of Independence	14 August 1821	Callao, Peru	Royalist victory
Battle of Macacona	Peruvian War of Independence	7 April 1822	Ica, Peru	Royalist victory
Battle of Riobamba	Ecuadorian War of Independence	21 April 1822	Riobamba, Ecuador	Patriot victory
Battle of Pichincha	Ecuadorian War of Independence	24 May 1822	Pichinca Volcano, Ecuador	Patriot victory
Battle of Torata	Peruvian War of Independence	19 January 1823	Torata, Peru	Royalist victory
2nd Battle of Moquegua	Peruvian War of Independence	21 January 1823	Moquegua, Peru	Royalist victory
Battle of Zepita	Peruvian War of Independence	25 August 1823	Zepita, Peru	Patriot victory
Capture of Arequipa	Peruvian War of Independence	30 August 1823	Arequipa, Peru	Patriot victory
Battle of Junín	Peruvian War of Independence	6 August 1824	Junín, Peru	Patriot victory
Battle of Corpahuaico	Peruvian War of Independence	3 December 1824	Cangallo province, Peru	Royalist victory
Battle of Ayacucho	Peruvian War of Independence	9 December 1824	Ayacucho, Peru	Patriot victory
