= Timeline of the Argentine War of Independence =

Argentine War of Independence
- Part of the Spanish American wars of independence
- From top and left: Crossing of the Andes, Battle of Salta, 22 May 1810 Open Cabildo, Battle of San Lorenzo, Battle of Suipacha, 1813 Assembly, Shooting of Liniers, Jujuy Exodus.
Date	25 May 1810 – 7 April 1825 (14 years, 10 months, 1 week and 6 days)
Location	Modern-day Argentina, Chile, Uruguay, Paraguay, Bolivia, Peru and Ecuador
Result	Argentine victory

Belligerents
Patriots; United Provinces of the Río de la Plata Kingdom of Chile (1811); Republic of Chile (1817-1818); Republiquetas	Royalists: Kingdom of Spain; Viceroyalty of Peru; Viceroyalty of the Río de la Plata; Captaincy General of Chile; Intendency of Paraguay (1810-1811); Kingdom of Portugal (1811–1812)

Commanders and leaders
Northern Front; Manuel Belgrano; Juan Castelli; González Balcarce; Martín de Güemes; Juana Azurduy Eastern Front; William Brown; Hipólito Bouchard; José Rondeau; José Artigas Andes Front; José de San Martín; Juan de las Heras; Bernardo O'Higgins	Northern Front; J. de Goyeneche; Córdoba y Rojas; Pío de Tristán; J. de la Pezuela; Pedro Olañeta Eastern Front; Gaspar de Vigodet; F.J. de Elío; J. de Romarate; Prince John Andes Front; Mariano Osorio; Rafael Maroto; José Ordóñez

Units involved
Army of Peru; Regiment of Mounted Grenadiers; Army of the Andes; Republiquetas, gauchos and other soldiers	Royal Army of Peru; Montevido Navy and Urban Militias; Intendancy of Paraguay forces Other royalist forces

The Argentine War of Independence was fought from 1810 to 1818 by Argentine patriotic forces under Manuel Belgrano, Juan José Castelli and José de San Martín against royalist forces loyal to the Spanish crown. On July 9, 1816, an assembly met in San Miguel de Tucumán, declared full independence with provisions for a national constitution.

== 1806 ==
- August 6: The first British invasion of the Río de la Plata is defeated by an army led by Santiago de Liniers. In the absence of the viceroy Rafael de Sobremonte, Liniers is appointed captain general.

== 1807 ==
- February 10: Rafael de Sobremonte, viceroy of the Viceroyalty of the Río de la Plata, is deposed and replaced by Santiago de Liniers.
- July 7: The second British invasion of the Río de la Plata is defeated.

== 1808 ==
- Napoleon invades Spain and starts the Peninsular War.
  - Mutiny of Aranjuez. A popular uprising forces the King Charles IV to abdicate, being replaced by his son, Ferdinand VII
  - Ferdinand VII is removed as king of Spain and replaced by Joseph Bonaparte, appointed by Napoleon.
  - Popular resistance creates government Juntas. The Supreme Central and Governing Junta of the Kingdom is created.
- Disputes at the Río de la Plata between Liniers and Francisco Javier de Elío. Elío creates a government Junta in Montevideo.

== 1809 ==
- January 1: Mutiny of Álzaga, defeated by local militias.
- Liniers is replaced by Baltasar Hidalgo de Cisneros, viceroy designated by the Junta of Seville.
- Mariano Moreno writes The Representation of the Hacendados.
- Cisneros briefly opens the Port of Buenos Aires to foreign trade.

== 1810 ==
- The government of Spain is defeated by French forces and the Supreme Central and Governing Junta was replaced by the Regency
- The Cortes of Cádiz convenes in Spain
- An open cabildo in Buenos Aires deposes the viceroy and creates a government junta.
- Córdoba rejects the Junta of Buenos Aires. Liniers leads a counter-revolution, which is defeated. Liniers is executed as result.
- Buenos Aires organizes military campaigns against Paraguay and the Upper Peru.

== 1811 ==
- Francisco Javier de Elío is appointed viceroy by the Juntas of Cádiz, and Montevideo the capital of the Viceroyalty of the Río de la Plata. Elío declares war against the Junta of Buenos Aires, but gets sieged by the surrounding cities.
- Mariano Moreno resigns from the Primera Junta, and dies at sea while traveling to Europe. Nevertheless, disputes between Saavedrist and Morenist groups in Buenos Aires continue.
- Paraguay becomes independent
- The Army of the North is defeated in the Battle of Guaqui. The revolutionaries lost the Upper Peru and their mines.
- The Junta Grande of Buenos Aires is replaced by the First Triumvirate

== 1812 ==
- Manuel Belgrano creates the Flag of Argentina
- José de San Martín and Carlos María de Alvear arrive in Buenos Aires from Europe
- Martín de Álzaga is executed after a failed mutiny against the First Triumvirate
- Belgrano defeats the royalists at the Battle of Tucumán
- The First Triumvirate is deposed by San Martín and Alvear, and replaced by the Second Triumvirate
- José Gervasio Artigas, José Rondeau and Soler defeat Gaspar de Vigodet

== 1813 ==
- February 3: José de San Martín defeats a royalist raid from Montevideo during the Battle of San Lorenzo
- Joseph Bonaparte flees from Spain and Ferdinand VII recovers the Spanish crown
- The XIII Year Assembly starts in Buenos Aires. It approves the Canción patriótica by Vicente López y Planes as the Argentine National Anthem
- Patriots are defeated at the Battle of Vilcapugio and the Battle of Ayohuma

== 1814 ==
- January (exact date disputed): Yatasto relay in Salta. Manuel Belgrano hands the command of the Army of the North to José de San Martín.
- Ferdinand VII returns to Spain. Absolutism is restored; the 1812 Constitution is repealed and the Cortes dissolved.
- José Gervasio Artigas gives up the siege on Montevideo
- The Second Triumvirate is replaced by the Supreme Director, the first one being Gervasio Antonio de Posadas
- Posadas makes Artigas an outlaw because of the creation of the Liga Federal.
- Martín Miguel de Güemes starts the "Guerra Gaucha"
- Montevideo is defeated
- Artigas recovers his titles and the Banda Oriental becomes autonomous
- San Martin is appointed governor of the Cuyo Province
- Posadas resigns

== 1815 ==
- Carlos María de Alvear is appointed Supreme Director of the United Provinces of the Río de la Plata. He is removed shortly after, and replaced by José Rondeau.
- The Assembly of Year XIII ends its work.
- Artigas creates the Liga de los Pueblos Libres
- Argentineans defeated in the Battle of Viluma

== 1816 ==
- March 10: A group of royalist scouts is captured during the action of Juncalito.
- Only the region of the Río de la Plata remains under patriotic control.
- The prince Juan raises Brazil to a kingdom and keeps the expansionist policy towards the Rio de la Plata. Their forces invade the Banda Oriental, and Artigas organizes the resistance
- The Congress of Tucumán starts working
  - It declares the independence of the United Provinces
  - It designates Juan Martín de Pueyrredón as Supreme Director
  - The flag created by Manuel Belgrano is chosen to be the Flag of Argentina
  - San Martín is appointed head of the Army of the Andes, and Belgrano head of the Army of the North
  - July 9, after years of battle on many different grounds the Congress of Tucumán formally declared the independence of the United Provinces of the Río de la Plata from Spain.

== 1817 ==
- José de San Martín leads the Crossing of the Andes, defeats the Chilean royalists at the Battle of Chacabuco, and triumphantly enters Santiago, Chile
- Brazil completes the invasion of the Banda Oriental
- The Congress of Tucumán moves to Buenos Aires
- Royalists leave Salta and Jujuy, under the pressure of Martín Miguel de Güemes
- Juan Martín de Pueyrredón sends armies to defeat Artigas in the Litoral, but gets defeated by Francisco Ramírez

== 1820 ==
- Trienio Liberal disband the military Great Expedition against the Rio de la Plata
- José de San Martin leaves Chile with the navy, aiming to defeat the royalists at Peru

== 1822 ==
- The United States recognizes the independence of the former Spanish colonies
- Bolívar and San Martin meet at Guayaquil
- San Martin fails to defeat the royalists in Peru, resigns from power and leaves Lima

== See also ==
- Argentine War of Independence
- List of Argentine War of Independence battles

== Bibliography ==
- Luna, Félix (2003). La independencia argentina y americana (in Spanish). Buenos Aires: Planeta. ISBN 950-49-1110-2.
