= Upper Peru campaign =

Upper Peru campaign may refer to:

- First Upper Peru campaign
- Second Upper Peru campaign
- Third Upper Peru campaign
- Fourth Upper Peru campaign
