= Yavi Chico =

- Rural municipality and village
- Location within Argentina
- Coordinates: 22°06′S 65°28′W
- Country: Argentina
- Province: Jujuy Province
- Elevation: 3,495 m (11,467 ft)

Population (2001)
  - Total: 77
- Time zone: UTC−3 (ART)
- Postal code: Y4644

Yavi Chico is a rural municipality and village in Jujuy Province in Argentina.

It is located in the border area with Bolivia, 4 km from the town of Yavi via Provincial Highway 5, 16 km from the city of La Quiaca, and 318 km from San Salvador de Jujuy.

It has 77 inhabitants (National Institute of Statistics and Census of Argentina, 2001), and in the 1991 census had been enumerated as having a dispersed rural population.
