= Battle of Sopachuy =

1817 conflict in Bolivian and Argentine Wars of Independence

- Part of Bolivian War of Independence; Argentine War of Independence
Date	12 June 1817
Location	Sopachuy, Bolivia 19°29′09″S 64°28′25″W
Result	Spanish victory

Belligerents
United Provinces	Spain

Commanders and leaders
(Argentina) Gregorio Aráoz de Lamadrid; Lorenzo Lugones	José Santos de la Hera; Baldomero Espartero

Casualties and losses
300 killed 100 prisoners 2 cannons	Light
- Location within Bolivia Battle of Sopachuy (South America) Battle of Sopachuy (America)

The Battle of Sopachuy was an armed confrontation that occurred on 12 June 1817 in the village of Sopachuy, some 120 kilometers southeast from the city of Chuquisaca (today Sucre), between a division of the Army of the North of the United Provinces of the Río de la Plata, commanded by Lieutenant Colonel Gregorio Aráoz de Lamadrid and a Spanish Royalist force commanded by Colonel José Santos de la Hera. The Royalists routed the Patriot force, who was forced to retreat in disarray.

== Prelude ==
In early 1817, the commander of the Army of the North of the United Provinces of the Río de la Plata, Manuel Belgrano, had sent a small military division to Upper Peru under the command of Lieutenant Colonel Gregorio Aráoz de Lamadrid with the aim of hindering the Royal Army of Peru as much as possible.
After defeating the Royalist garrison at Tarija, Patriot commander Lamadrid directed his troops, reinforced with Upper-Peruvian guerrillas to Chuquisaca, with the purpose of taking it. They arrived there on 20 May, but the Patriot army had to lift the siege and retreat to the southeast, being pursued by the Royalist division of Brigadier Diego O'Reilly. In the village of Sopachuy, Lamadrid tried to establish defensive positions with 900 men and 2 cannons, however on 14 June, they were suddenly attacked by a Royalist column.

== The Battle ==
The attacking forces, led by Colonel La Hera and his second in command Baldomero Espartero, and consisting of the batallón del Centro and a cavalry squadron with a total of 300 men, had advanced on the rest of their division and marched along the right flank of the Patriot column, with the purpose of enveloping them. Surprised by the sudden volleys of the Royalist troops, Lamadrid barely had time to organize resistance as his men were quickly defeated and dispersed.

In their flight the Patriots abandoned their 2 cannons, baggage and even the prisoners they had captured in the previous encounters. The Royalists also captured the banner of the Tucumán Hussars, 500 horses and 100 prisoners, leaving nearly 300 Patriot soldiers dead on the field. In the pursuit that followed, Patriot Major Ravelo and Captain Lorenzo Lugones distinguished themselves, by managing with the guerrillas under their command, to prevent the rest of the Patriot force from being completely destroyed.

On the Royalist side, Commander Baldomero Espartero, future Regent of Spain (1840-1843), fought with distinction.

== Consequences ==
In the days following the battle, Brigadier Mariano Ricafort reconquered Tarija for the Royalists on 11 July 1817. Lamadrid with his army managed to return to San Miguel de Tucumán.
This would be the fourth and last time that the Northern Army had tried to advance into Upper Peru, which would remain under Royalist control until 1825, after the Battle of Ayacucho. The Upper-Peruvian guerrilla groups that had risen in support of the Patriotic forces, would be successively fought by the Royalists and destroyed for the most part.

== Sources ==
- This is a translation of the article Combate de Sopachuy in the Spanish Wikipedia.
- Torrente, Mariano "Historia de la revolución hispano-americana", Volumen 2.
- Mitre, Bartolomé "Historia de Belgrano y de la independencia argentina", Volumen 3.
