= Acoyte =

Acoyte may refer to:

- Acoyte (Salta), a village in Salta province, Argentina
- Acoyte (Buenos Aires Metro), a station in Buenos Aires, Argentina
