= Carlos León Palma =

Chilean politician

Carlos León Palma (Portezuelo, October 20, 1885) was a Chilean landowner, merchant and politician.

== Biography ==
He was born in Portezuelo on October 20, 1885, son of the deputy and Minister of State Ramón León Luco and Delfina Palma Cavero. He was the great-grandson of Pedro Nolasco León. He studied at the St. Ignatius College in Santiago de Chile. He married Enriqueta Pastor Bambach, with whom he had no children.

He was elected deputy in 1924 representing the department of Itata. A member of the Liberal Party, he held his seat until September of that same year, when the sessions of Congress were suspended due to the coup d'état of Luis Altamirano Talavera.

By 1934 he was living in Tomé, where he was councilor and manager of the León y Cía Wine Company. He was the last owner of the family estate Taiguén, in Itata.
