= Quitento =

Chilean village

Quitento (commonly misspelled Quilento and Quileto) is a Chilean village located at the south of Portezuelo, near the Cucha-Cucha estate. It is currently part of the Portezuelo commune, Itata Province, Ñuble Region.

Originally itself an estate, it turned into a village in later years. It is located near the Quitento River, which derives from the Ñuble River and was just two leagues long within the 5th Subdelegation of the historical Itata Department.

Later in the 19th century, in 1885, the district of Quitento, the third of the Portezuelo subdelegation, in Itata Department, was created. Its limits were: "at the north, the first district and part of the second one; at the west, a line between the San José estate houses, property of José Asandro Romero, extending up to the houses of Santa Ana estate, of Carlos Gutiérrez, continuing to the south by the public road until the Cucha-Cucha flow, beside the Isidoro Torres house, a place named Caulle, beneath the Cucha-Cucha flow; and south, another line that, beginning on the aforementioned houses, continues to the west, passes by a place where there are three palmas and finishing in the top of Comén hill".
