= Battle of la Tablada de Tolomosa =

1817 conflict in Bolivian and Argentine Wars of Independence

- Part of Bolivian War of Independence; Argentine War of Independence
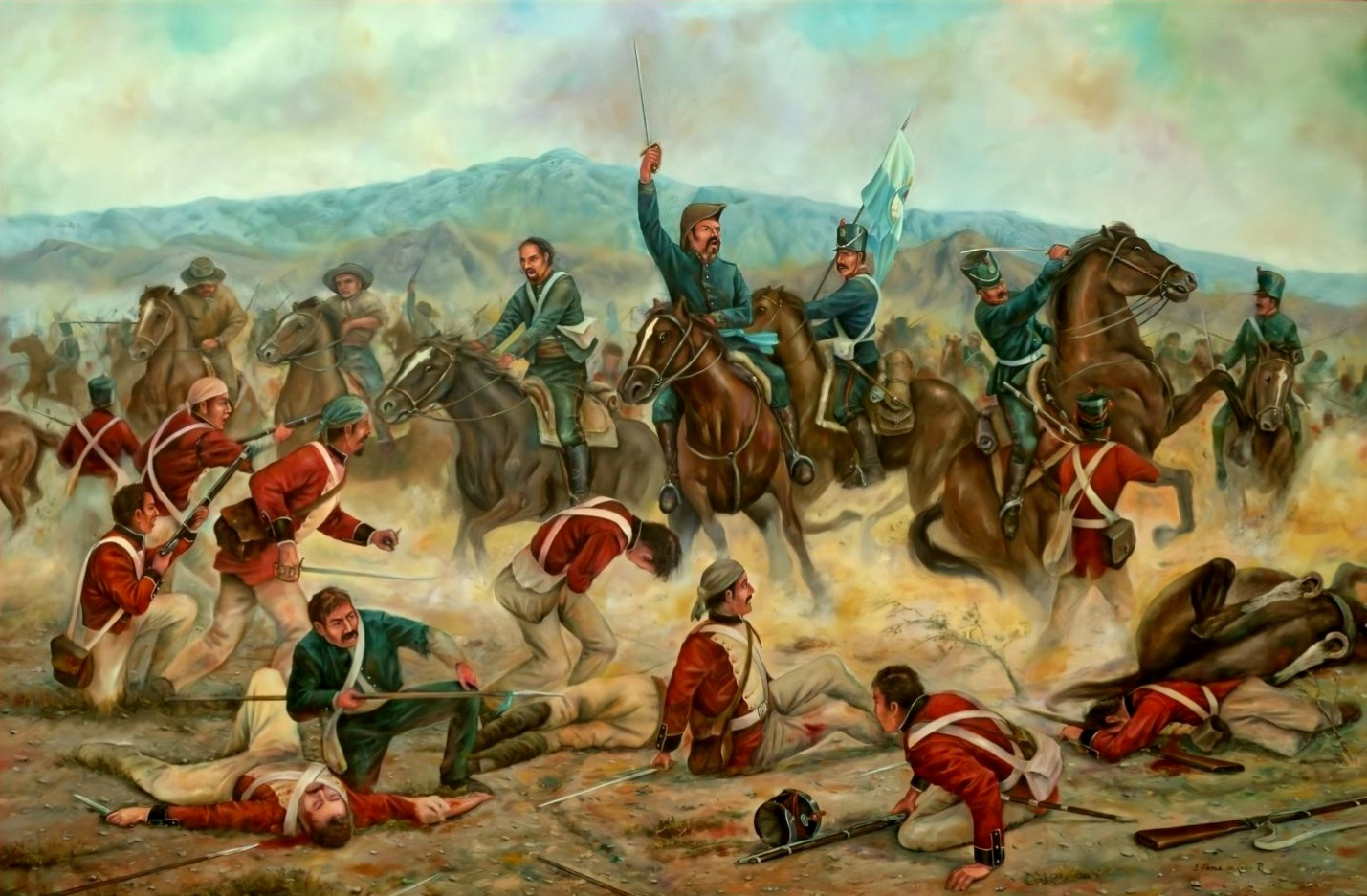
- The Battle of La Tablada from Tarija's Historical Archives
Date	April 15, 1817
Location	Tarija, Bolivia 21°32′18.4″S 64°49′31.2″W
Result	United Provinces victory

Belligerents
United Provinces; Republiquetas	Spain

Commanders and leaders
G. de Lamadrid	(Spain) Mateo Ramírez

Casualties and losses
2 killed	62 killed 334 prisoners
- Location within Bolivia Battle of la Tablada de Tolomosa (South America) Battle of la Tablada de Tolomosa (America)

The Battle of la Tablada de Tolomosa was fought on 15 April 1817 near the town of Tarija in today's southern Bolivia between the royalist forces under colonel Mateo Ramírez and republican local forces under Eustaquio Méndez allied with the Army of the North under Gregorio Aráoz de Lamadrid.

The main caudillos directing the militias were Méndez, José María Avilés and Colonel Francisco Pérez de Uriondo, one of the Tarijan's commanders allied with General Güemes' guerrillas. The town's center was under Ramírez and well defended by royalist troops.

The local Montoneros guerrillas surrounded the town and Ramírez's troops. Tarija's chieftains had more than 1000 men ready for battle. Lieutenant Colonel Aráoz de Lamadrid, was arriving with nearly 500 men from Argentina's territory to the South with a regiment of Hussars and militias from Tucumán. Nearing Tarija he learned that the local forces were harassing Ramírez's troops, and going down the hills at Tolomosa, he arrived in the town encountering Méndez, an old acquaintance of the Argentine chief. Lamadrid, with his small force was at the time in battle with the enemy. With Méndez' arrival they vanquished the royalist left flank, while Lamadrid attacked in the center, with a victory making the royalists flee. The Army of the North and the local militias took control of Tarija itself.

Afterwards, the revolutionaries returned to the camp where their Argentine commander released the prisoners obtaining Ramírez's surrender along with other royalist officers, among them Andrés de Santa Cruz, who later would switch sides by joining the revolutionary forces in Peru.
