= Bolivian War of Independence =

Conflict for Bolivian independence from the Spanish Empire (1809-25)

- Part of the Spanish American wars of independence
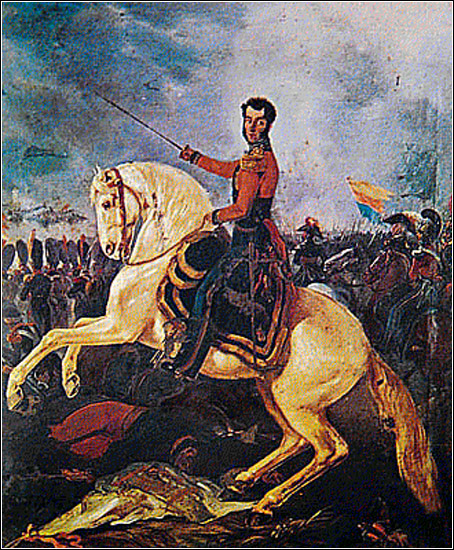
- Antonio José de Sucre at the Battle of Ayacucho (9 December 1824)
Date	25 May 1809 – 6 August 1825 (16 years, 2 months, 1 week and 5 days)
Location	Upper Peru (modern Bolivia)
Result	Patriot victory: Independence of Bolivia

Belligerents
Patriots: Bolivia; Republiquetas; Gran Colombia; Peru; (Argentina) United Provinces	Royalists: Kingdom of Spain and the Indies; Viceroyalty of Peru; Viceroyalty of the Río de la Plata

Commanders and leaders
Simón Bolívar; Andrés de Santa Cruz; Antonio de Sucre; José Balancer; Eustaquio Méndez; José Ballivián; José Manuel Mercado	Pedro Olañeta; José Goyeneche; Pío de Tristán; Joaquín de la Pezuela; José de la Serna; José María Valdez

The Bolivian War of Independence (Spanish: Guerra de Independencia de Bolivia, 1809–1825) began with the establishment of government juntas in Sucre and La Paz after the Chuquisaca Revolution and La Paz revolution. These Juntas, part of the Viceroyalty of the Río de la Plata, were defeated shortly after by Peruvian royalist forces. Following the May Revolution of 1810, which ousted the viceroy in Buenos Aires and established its own junta, the territory was incorporated into the Viceroyalty of Peru. Buenos Aires then sent three large military expeditions to Upper Peru, headed by Juan José Castelli, Manuel Belgrano and José Rondeau, but the royalists ultimately prevailed over each one. However, the conflict grew into a guerrilla war, the War of the Republiquetas, preventing the royalists from strengthening their presence. After Simón Bolívar and Antonio José de Sucre defeated the royalists in the Independence of Peru, Sucre led a campaign that was to defeat the royalists in Charcas for good when the last royalist general, Pedro Antonio Olañeta, suffered death and defeat at the hands of his own defected forces at the Battle of Tumusla. Bolivian independence was proclaimed on 6 August 1825.

== The Colonial Governing Power and the Causes of the War ==
Charcas (modern day Bolivia) is also sometimes referred to as the Upper Peru. This region fell under the authority of Spanish colonial rule in the sixteenth century. It was originally placed directly under the rule of the Viceroyalty of Peru, however this location proved to be too distant for effective control so Phillip II established the Audiencia of Charcas, which was an autonomous governing body under the purview of the viceroy of Peru. This governing was composed of oidores or judges and a governor with the title of president of the Audiencia. The Audiencia was given authority to make final decisions when a viceroy was unavailable or absent.

The Audiencia was centered in Chuquisaca, which started out as an indigenous community and later became known by its post-independence name, Sucre. This was the center of administration as well as cultural activities for Charcas. The Archbishop of Charcas lived there and one of the prominent universities in Bolivia, was founded there. The Audiencia was a great honor for the Charcas. Oidores mostly came directly from Spain and tended to be very proud, often making everyone bow to them. They were also incredibly ignorant about the peoples' needs and problems. As Spanish settlements expanded to the south, the jurisdiction of the Audiencia of Charcas grew to include not only present day Bolivia, but also Argentina, Uruguay, Paraguay and even parts of Peru. In 1776, the Audiencia of Charcas was placed under the authority of the viceroy of Buenos Aires in the newly created Viceroyalty of the Río de la Plata and most trade was redirected to Buenos Aires. This change was against Peruvian desires because they had wanted to keep Charcas for its enormous wealth in the mines of Potosí. For the next few decades, the question of the political and economic ties with Charcas was constantly fought over by Peru and Río de la Plata. On 25 May 1809, the citizens of Sucre participated in the first outbreak that was part of the initiation of the war of independence in Bolivia.

In 1784 the Spanish rulers created the intendancy system. Four main intendancies were constructed in La Paz, Cochabamba, Potosí, and Chuquisaca. This system gave authority to a few, skillful and educated men who were directly responsible to the King of Spain. This system was implemented to increase revenue as well as to stop specific problems that had resulted from other authorities misusing their power. The system consequently limited the power of the Audiencia.

The Bolivian people were divided into three main categories: Criollos, Mestizos, and the indigenous population. In authority over all of these people were the Peninsulares, who were influential people who had come from Spain to assume a leadership position in the church or government, in one of the Spanish colonies. All the rest of the Bolivian people had a social status beneath this elite class. The Criollos were people of pure Spanish descent who had been born in Latin America. The Criollos were envious of the power the Peninsulares held, and this attitude formed part of the basis for the War of Independence. Beneath the Criollos on the social hierarchy were the Mestizos, who were a mix of Spanish and Indigenous descent. The main reason these two people mixed was because of the lack of Spanish women in the region. Finally, at the bottom of the hierarchy was the biggest social class, the indigenous people, who primarily spoke Aymara and Quechua. These people often did not know what was going on politically in the country. However they offered a large force of fighting men for both the patriots and the royalists in the war. Nevertheless, in the War of Independence they proved to be very unpredictable and would, at times, turn on the army at any provocation. These people would generally fight for whoever controlled that area, whether loyalists, patriots, or royalists. The majority of the time it was the Republiquetas who controlled the rural areas where the Natives lived. Although they would fight for whomever, these people favored the patriots because they were part native, whereas the other armies were of pure Spanish descent. The real intention of the Indigenous people was to reestablish the Incan empire and so they wanted a form of government different from all three of the other groups. These groups all contended for the Natives' assistance in order to win the war; however not one army ever thought of liberating these people.

Independence was not a new idea in the minds of the people of the Charcas. This concept had begun to take root long before and already signs of discontent with the current form of government were beginning to show. The individuals in every class of the Bolivian population had become dissatisfied - the Criollos, the Mestizos, as well as the Indigenous people. They were all feeling the effects of increased Spanish taxes and trade restrictions. Indigenous rebellions started in 1730 in Cochabamba and others followed in the decades to come. Although most of the people were unhappy, the different social classes were not unified in their solution to the dilemma. The indigenous people wanted to do away with all the Spanish people and set up an Andean Utopia, whereas the Criollos simply desired more freedom from Spain. Because the Criollos bore racial prejudice against the Native population, those two groups of people did not unite against Spain.

Many revolutionary ideas spread from the university in Chuquisaca. In the early 1780s different students in the university distributed pamphlets in Charcas. These were written against Spanish authority and in them public officials were even called thieves. The ideas of independence really stemmed from Aquinas, a church father, who wrote about politics. He taught that if a ruler is cruel and tyrannical the people have a right to rebel and fight against their own government. The ruler should be under the Pope, thus the people can rebel against the King but not against God. There was not one main leader of the Revolutionaries or Radicals. Nevertheless, three main men were influential in this circle: Jaime Zudañez, Manuel Zudañez, and Bernardo Monteagudo. Jaime Zudañez was part of the Audiencia in the department of the defense of the poor. He would try to influence the decisions the Audiencia made and no one suspected his treasonous behavior. Manuel Zudeñez, his brother, was in the government as well and held an important position in the university in Chuquisaca. Finally Bernardo Monteagudo was a writer from a poor family but had an impact on the people through his whispering campaigns. All three of these men were in favor of doing away with the president, Ramón García León de Pizarro.

== The juntas of 1809 ==
During the Peninsular War which took place in Spain, Charcas (today Bolivia) closely followed the reports that arrived describing the rapidly evolving political situation in Spain, which led the Peninsula to near anarchy. The sense of uncertainty was heightened by the fact that news of 17 March Mutiny of Aranjuez and 6 May 1808 abdication of Ferdinand VII in favor of Joseph Bonaparte arrived within a month of each other, on 21 August and 17 September, respectively. In the confusion that followed, various juntas in Spain and Portuguese Princess Carlota, sister of Ferdinand VII, in Brazil claimed authority over the Americas.

On 11 November, the representative of the Junta of Seville, José Manuel de Goyeneche, arrived in Chuquisaca, after stopping in Buenos Aires, with instructions to secure Charcas' recognition of authority of the Seville Junta. He also brought with him a letter from Princess Carlota requesting the recognition of her right to rule in her brother's absence. The President-Intendant Ramón García León de Pizarro, backed by the Archbishop of Chuquisaca Benito María de Moxó y Francolí, was inclined to recognize the Seville Junta, but the mostly Peninsular Audiencia of Charcas, in its function as a privy council for the President (the real acuerdo), felt it would be hasty to recognize either one. A fist fight almost broke between the senior oidor and Goyeneche over the issue, but the oidores' opinion prevailed. The Radicals or Revolutionaries supported the Audiencia's decision because it put the power more into the hands of the people in Latin America as well as because it was a "temporary" split with Spain during this time of tribulation in the land of Spain. Over the next few weeks García León and Moxó became convinced that recognizing Carlota might be the best way to preserve the unity of the empire, but this was unpopular with the majority of Charcasvians and the Audiencia. The President and the Archbishop grew very unpopular with the oidores because the archbishop informed the people of all the news that arrived from Spain. The Audiencia wanted to conceal the information in order to not acknowledge their own weaknesses. During this time the Catholic Church in Charcas split from the "Audiencia" because of the tension between Moxó and the Oidores.

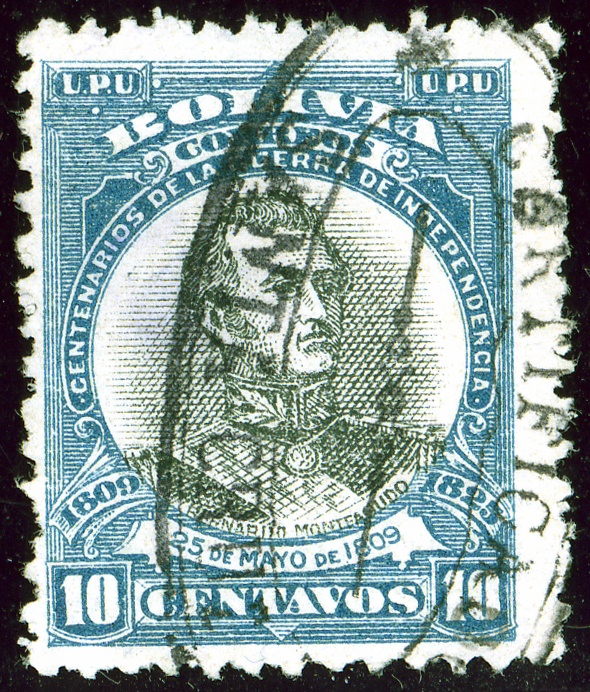
100 years of struggle for independence: 25 de Mayo de 1809 on a commemorative stamp

On 26 May 1809, the Audiencia oidores received rumors that García León de Pizarro planned to arrest them in order to recognize Carlota. The Audiencia decided that the situation had become so anarchic both in Charcas and in the Peninsula, that Charcas needed to take the government into its own hands. It removed García León de Pizarro from office and transformed itself into a junta, which ruled in Fernando's name, just as cities and provinces had done in Spain a year earlier. A second junta was established in La Paz on 16 July by Criollos who took over the local barracks and deposed both the intendant and bishop of La Paz. The La Paz junta clearly broke with any authority in Spain and with the authorities in Buenos Aires. José de la Serna, the Spanish Viceroy in Lima dispatched five thousand soldiers led by none other than Goyeneche, who had become the president of Audiencia in Cuzco. The rebels were defeated and the leaders of the movement were hanged or sentenced to imprisonment for life. The Audiencia had to beg for mercy as well as make an agreement with the Royalists so that the city of Chuquisaca would not be left in ruin by the army. This rebellion was stopped, however the yearning for freedom was far from extinguished. After Buenos Aires successfully established a junta in May 1810, Charcas came under the control of the Viceroyalty of Peru and managed to fight off several attempts to take over it militarily.

The Peninsulares had very divided opinions regarding which form of government was that best and what claims from Spain were actually true, thus they unconsciously left room for other groups to take the initiative for the future of Charcas. The Criollos were excited about this break between the President and the Audiencia because they took it as an excellent opportunity to gain the power they had always craved but never obtained because of the Spanish government. These upper class Criollos were divided into three main sections. The first one was very influenced by the Peninsulares and so did not desire anything to change. The second sector longed for an independent government. The final group was made up of the Radicals who wanted an independent government, not to solely accomplish that end, but to bring about deeper social reforms. The middle class Criollos as well as the Mestizos did not actively participate in expressing their opinions because they lacked leadership but were very attentive to all that was happening during the war.

== The republiquetas ==
From 1810 to 1824, the idea of independence was kept alive by six guerrilla bands that formed in the backcountry of Charcas. The areas they controlled are called republiquetas ("petty republics") in the historiography of Bolivia. The republiquetas were located in the Lake Titicaca region, Mizque, Vallegrande, Ayopaya, the countryside around Sucre, the southern region near today's Argentina and Santa Cruz de la Sierra. The republiquetas were led by caudillos whose power was based on their personality and ability to win military engagements. This allowed them to create quasi-states which attracted varied followers, ranging from political exiles of the main urban centers to cattle rustlers and other fringe members of Criollo and Mestizo society. These Criollo and Mestizo republiquetas often allied themselves with the local Indian communities, although it was not always possible to keep the Natives' loyalty, since their own material and political interests often eclipsed the idea of regional independence. Ultimately the republiquetas never had the size nor organization to actually bring about the independence of Charcas, but instead maintained a fifteen-year stalemate with royalist regions, while holding off attempts by Buenos Aires to control the area. Most of these quasi states were so isolated that they had no knowledge that the others even existed.

During the time of the Republiquetas the radicals in Argentina had succeeded in winning the independence of the country on 25 May 1810. Since Charcas was included in the Viceroyalty of Río de la Plata the radicals were interested in freeing Charcas as well. The citizens of Charcas showed their support of this through an uprising against the Royalists. Three armies were sent over from Argentina from 1810 to 1817. The first army sent was led by Juan José Castelli. After his victory at Suipacha, he arrested the president of the Audiencia, the intendant of Potosí, as well as a Royalist general. The people protested against this act because these people were respected in the community although they were on the opposing side. Castelli did not heed their plead but executed them anyway because they would not submit to Argentina. The Argentinian army looted, stole, killed, and misused the citizens of Potosí. They not only disrespected the women there, they also killed those who attempted to stop this behavior. Eventually they left to go conquer Chuquisaca. Castelli went from city to city in Charcas freeing the people from Royalist forces, but destroying the cities and mistreating its citizens in the process. Despite all of this, he did try to make reforms to free the indigenous and improve their quality of life. He finally arrived at the border of Viceroyalty of Lima and stopped and made a treaty with Goyeneche, yet he did not respect the treaty and kept expanding. Therefore, on 20 June 1811, Goyeneche attacked Castelli's army in Huaqui, south of Titicaca lake, causing them to flee back toward Argentina. They were forced to bypass Oruro and other cities because the people there wanted revenge for the trouble they had caused. Goyeneche did not continue pursuing Castelli's army, but instead paused and cared for all the wounded. Castelli nonetheless, was eventually run out of the country and the Royalists took control.
Two more auxiliary armies from Argentina followed but both were eventually defeated. Manuel Belgrano led the Second Upper Peru campaign (1812–1813), but was defeated in the battles of Vilcapugio and Ayohuma. A third campaign in 1815 was also repelled after a crushing defeat in the Battle of Sipe-Sipe.

The areas of Charcas which remained under royalist control elected a representative to the Cortes of Cádiz, Mariano Rodríguez Olmedo, who served from 4 May 1813, to 5 May 1814. Rodríguez Olmedo was a conservative representative, signing the 1814 request, known as the " Manifesto of the Persians"" ("Manifiesto de los Persas"), by seventy Cortes delegates to Ferdinand VII to repeal the Spanish Constitution of 1812.}

== Independence consolidated ==
Meanwhile, Simón Bolívar, who is considered by some to be the Napoleon of South America, and José de San Martín were endeavoring to free the surrounding territories in Latin America. San Martín, who was originally from Argentina, had liberated Chile and then moved on to Peru. San Martín believed that to eliminate Spanish rule in Latin America they had to defeat the Royalists in Peru. Charcas was then under the Viceroyalty of Lima and thus liberating Peru would lead to the liberation of Charcas as well. Therefore, because of this strong conviction that as long as Spain controlled the seas they would have a foothold on the continent, he created a fleet led by Lord Cochrane, who had joined the Chilean service in 1819. San Martín took over Lima in July 1821 and declared Peruvian independence. There, San Martín encountered much resistance from the Royalists who remained. During that time, his army began to crumple because of disease as well as soldiers abandoning the army. San Martín was left with no choice but to beg Bolívar for his help. Although Bolívar and San Martín met in Guayaquil, they could not agree on the form of government that should be established for the liberated countries, and so both went on their separate ways for the time being. San Martín returned to Peru, only to face a revolution in Lima that had started because the men left behind were incapable of governing the country. He resigned from his position as Protector of Peru, discouraged. Bolívar was convinced that it was his duty to rid the continent of the Spanish, and so journeyed to Lima. When he arrived on 1 September 1823, he immediately took command.

The fight for independence gained new impetus after the 9 December 1824 Battle of Ayacucho, in which a combined army of 5,700 Gran Colombian and Peruvian troops under the command of Antonio José de Sucre defeated the royalist army of 6,500 and captured its leader, the Viceroy José de la Serna.

However, Royalist armies still remained, which were the stronghold at El Callao and the army of General Olañeta in Charcas. The army at El Callao was contained and besieged by the Peruvian army, but Olañeta's army proved to be more difficult to eliminate. Olañeta was rumored to have planned to surrender Charcas to Brazil in 1824 in order to keep the country under Spanish control. He had asked for Brazil to send over an army; however, the governor of Brazil refused to become involved. Bolívar and San Martín both desired to make an agreement with Olañeta because he had helped them in the battle of Ayacucho. Sucre, Bolívar's most successful general, did not trust Olañeta and so despite his plan to make peace, he started to occupy Charcas. Sucre prepared to persuade this Royalist general, either with words or by force. Bolívar assumed that Olañeta would take a long time deciding what to do and planned to travel to Charcas during that time. However, Olañeta had planned one more sudden attack. Sucre invited the men of Charcas to join him and in January 1825, a large number of men from Olañeta's army deserted him and joined Sucre. On 9 March, Sucre had succeeded in capturing every Royalist general there except for Olañeta. Yet this fierce general refused to surrender. Finally on 13 April, part Olañeta's forces joined the patriots and mutinied. Olañeta was fatally wounded in the ensuing Battle of Tumusla. At last, Spain had relinquished its grip on South America, the final battles being fought in Charcas.

The Marshal Sucre called La Paz "the cradle of American Independence." The reason for this statement was that this city was the first place people were murdered for the desire for independence and now, decades later, the last Royalist forces had been defeated. What remained of the royalist forces dissolved because of mutiny and desertion. On 25 April 1825, Sucre arrived in Chuquisaca, which had been the hub of Spanish dominion. The citizens of the city rejoiced, gathering along the road. The town council, clergy, and the university students all congregated at the edge of Chuquisaca to greet Sucre. The people even went as far as preparing a Roman chariot pulled by twelve maidens dressed in blue and white to pull Sucre into the heart of the city.

Sucre called a meeting on 10 July in Chuquisaca to decide the fate of the country of Charcas. There were three options that the committee could decide from. Charcas could unite with Argentina, unite with Peru, or become independent. Bolívar's desire was for Charcas to unite with Peru; however, the council was in favor of becoming an independent nation. Although they did not all vote for this, all signed the declaration of independence on 6 August 1825. Although no one disputes that Bolivia was named after Bolívar, there are differences in opinion over why that actually happened. Some historians say that it is because the people were afraid Bolívar would be against the vote because Bolívar wanted Charcas to join Peru. Because of this, they proceeded to name the newly formed country after him to appease him. The Bolivian population still celebrates Bolívar's birthday as a national holiday to honor him. Bolívar was president for five months, during which time he reduced taxes, and reformed the land organization to aid the indigenous population. He left Sucre as president when he returned to govern the North. Sucre attempted to reduce the taxes that the indigenous were forced to pay. However, this plan failed because without it, he was not able to support the Gran Colombian Army which stopped the Argentinians from invading Bolivia again. Thus, the system remained in place.

From then on, local elites dominated the congress and although they supported Sucre's efforts, they chafed under the idea that a Gran Colombian army remained in the nation. After an attempt on his life, Sucre resigned the presidency of Bolivia in April 1828 and returned to Venezuela. The Bolivian Congress elected La Paz native Andrés de Santa Cruz as the new president. Santa Cruz had been a former royalist officer, served under José de San Martín after 1821 and then under Sucre in Ecuador, and had a short term as president of Peru from 1826 to 1827. Santa Cruz arrived in Bolivia in May 1829 and assumed office. Independence did not provide solidarity to the nation. For six decades afterward, the country had feeble and short governing institutions.

== Brief annexation by the Province of Mato Grosso ==
Spain, which betrayed Portugal in 1807 (its ally until then) to ally with France, saw himself betrayed by Napoleon, who imprisoned the Spanish royal family and nominated his brother, José Bonaparte, as King of Spain, title unrecognized by the population which resisted the French occupation. Thus, with the political vacuum created by the absence of its King, that is, by the absence of a central government, the Spanish Empire started to dismantle itself.

Independence movements started to surge in all Hispanic America, spreading war and chaos. In face of this sensation of unsafety and fearing the chaos, in June 1822, the three governors of the Spanish departments of Upper Peru (which had already being threatened by the troops of General Antonio Jose de Sucre and Simon Bolivar), reunited in Cuiaba (Capital of the Captaincy of Mato Grosso / Brazil) and solicited the governor that he interceded along with the Prince Regent Dom Pedro (that soon would be crowned as Dom Pedro I, Emperor of Brazil), in order that the United Kingdom of Portugal, Brazil and the Algarves annexed these territories, seeking to spare its population from the massacre and the chaos.

Immediately, the governor of Mato Grosso sent troops that were by his captaincy to the Upper Peru, blocking the advance of Bolivar and Sucre, and sent a letter to Dom Pedro, communicating him about the sending of troops and the solicitation of the authorities of Upper Peru (that later on would become Bolivia). Letter which was only received by Dom Pedro I in November 1822, when Brazil was already an independent nation. Besides, Bolivar and Sucre were quicker and sent representatives to the City of Rio de Janeiro, which came before the governor's letter. In this way, when the Prince Regent received the letter he had already decided not to annex Upper Peru, rejecting the solicitation from the governors of the region and ordering that the troops were removed from there.

With this, Dom Pedro I left the region of Upper Peru (modern Bolivia) up to its own luck, what culminated with the invasion of the Bolivar and Sucre troops and the Bolivian independence from Spain.

Clearly at that moment, Dom Pedro I was more worried in defeating the resistance of the liberal Portuguese troops on Brazilian soil, guaranteeing Brazilian unity. However, without this decision being made Bolivian territory may have been integrated into Brazil.

== See also ==
- Contemporary Bolivian history
- History of Bolivia
- List of wars involving Bolivia
- Military career of Simón Bolívar
- Peru-Bolivian Confederation, 1836–1839
- Spanish American wars of independence
- Chuquisaca Revolution
- Bolivian Declaration of Independence
- Republiquetas
