= First Banda Oriental campaign =

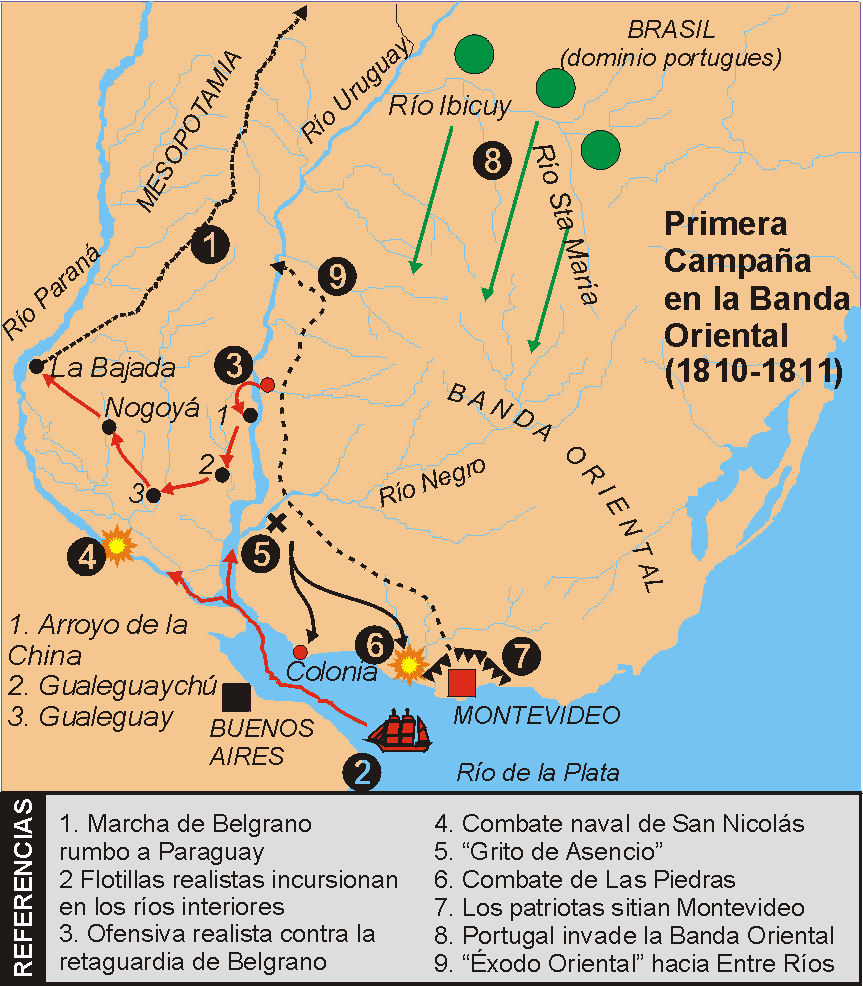
Map of operations

The first Banda Oriental campaign was a military campaign of the Argentine War of Independence, that attempted to capture the Banda Oriental (present-day Uruguay). It took place in 1810–1811. The countryside, led by José Gervasio Artigas, joined forces with Buenos Aires against Montevideo. The viceroy Javier de Elío requested help from colonial Brazil, forcing Buenos Aires to sign a controversial armistice.
