= Santa Victoria Oeste =

Coordinates: 22°16′21″S 62°42′45″W

- Municipality and village
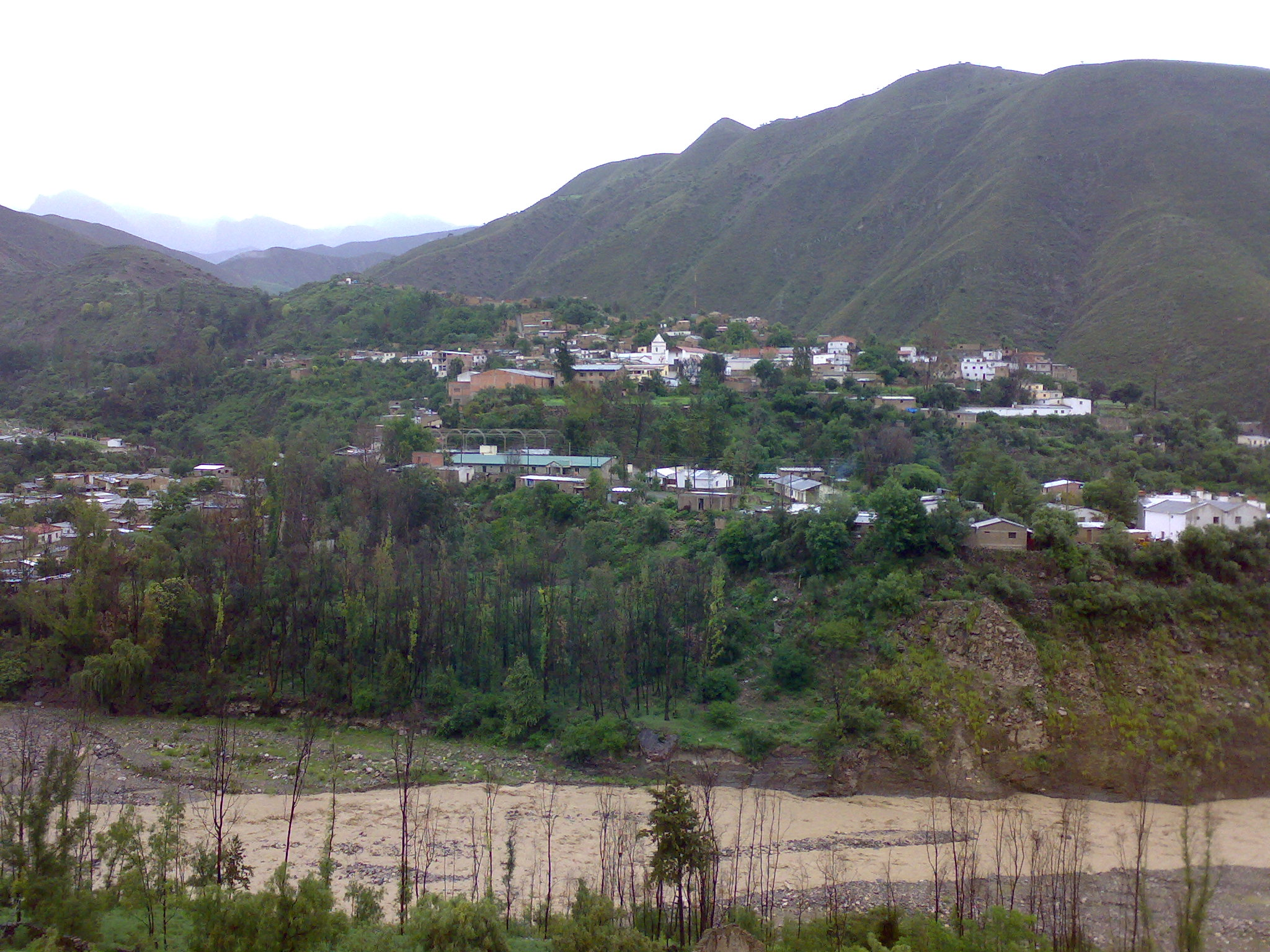
- Interactive map of Santa Victoria Oeste
- Country: Argentina
- Province: Salta Province
- Department: Santa Victoria
- Time zone: UTC−3 (ART)

Santa Victoria Oeste is a municipality and head of the Santa Victoria Department, at the northwest corner of the province of Salta, Argentina, between mountains and valleys on the border with the Plurinational State of Bolivia, 540 km from the city of Salta.

It lies on the western edge of the jungles of the Yungas, north of the province of Salta, in a spot where the woods begin to merge at each step with grasslands Prepuna emerges as a vision the people, at 2,400 meters.

The village is situated between the mountains, west of the hills Bravo and San Jose, and east, the ridge of hills Shipyards, Paraguay and Vallecito, a cover lifted into the Yungas forests. And at the intersection of rivers Acoyte and La Huerta.
