= Battle of Yavi =

1816 conflict in Argentine War of Independence

- Part of Argentine War of Independence
Date	15 November 1816
Location	Jujuy Province 22°07′54″S 65°27′48″W
Result	Royalist victory

Belligerents
United Provinces	Spain

Commanders and leaders
Marquis of Yavi	Pedro de Olañeta

Units involved
Army of Peru	Royal Army of Peru

Strength
600 soldiers	Unknown

Casualties and losses
300 prisoners	Very light
- Location within Argentina Battle of Yavi (South America) Battle of Yavi (America)

The Battle of Yavi (also called "the Surprise at Yavi") took place on 15 November 1816, and was one of the military battles to obtain Argentina's independence from Spain, but ended in defeat.

== Battle ==
The battle took place when the war between the patriots in Argentina and the royalists in Upper Peru (Bolivia) had been going on for six years. In November 1816, the royalists began a new invasion, advancing with 3,000 men under the command of Pedro Antonio de Olañeta, Juan Guillermo de Marquieguy, and Field Marshal José de la Serna.

The independentist troops in the area were commanded by Juan José Fernández Campero, a Spaniard landowner who supported the revolution. Campero, popularly known as the "Marquis of Yavi", commanded the eastern flank of General Güemes' army.

Unaware of the Spanish advance, Campero arrived at the town of Yavi, north of Humahuaca, on 14 November, in command of 600 men. There, he was surprised the next day by Marquiegui, who first seized their horses, then attacked the town from two directions, obtaining an easy victory. Campero, his second in command, and 300 men were taken prisoner.

== Consequences ==
The battle was a defeat for the Army of the North. As a result, the northern border of the Argentine territory collapsed and the provinces of Salta and Jujuy were invaded by the Spaniards.

The government in Buenos Aires decided then to continue the fight for independence through the Pacific flank (present-day Chile), under the command of General San Martín, while Salta's caudillo Martín Miguel de Güemes led a guerrilla war to keep at bay the royalist army in the northern provinces. This campaign is retrospectively known as La Guerra Gaucha ("The Gaucho War") after a 1905 novel by Leopoldo Lugones.
