= Sopachuy =

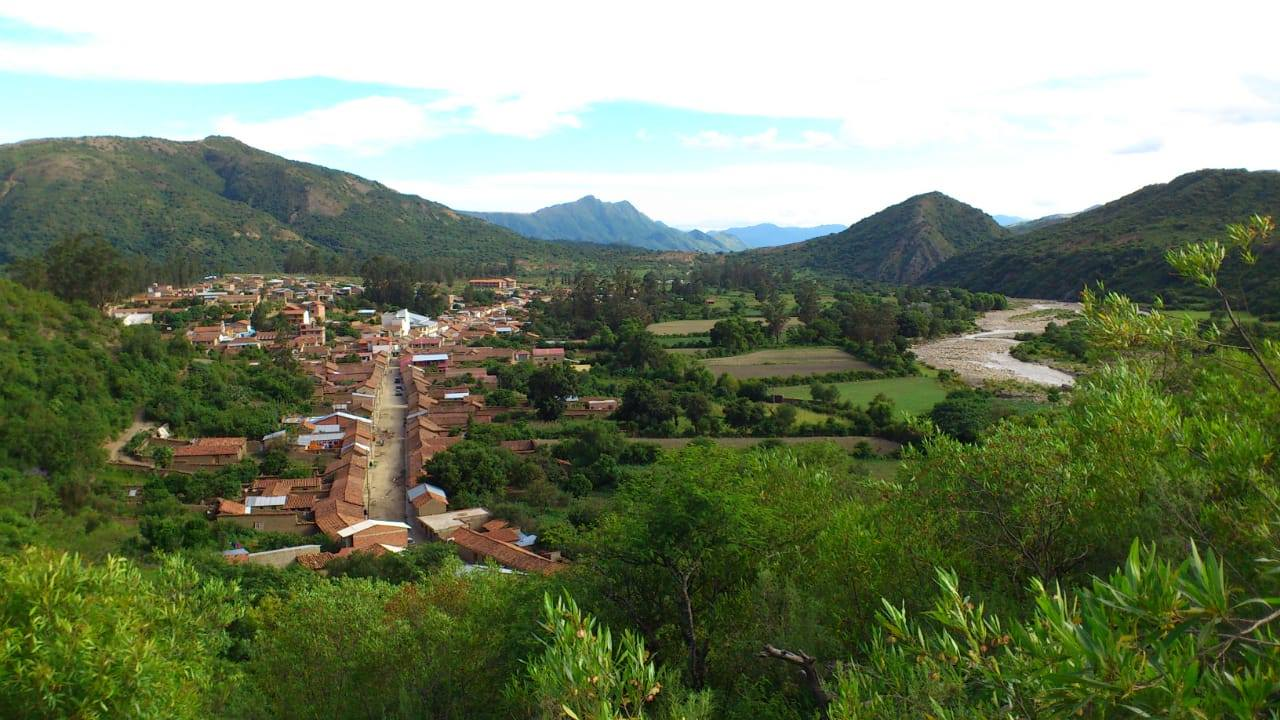
- view on Sopachuy

- Location within Bolivia
- Coordinates: 19°11′S 64°28′W
- Country: Bolivia
- Department: Chuquisaca Department
- Province: Tomina Province
- Municipality: Sopachuy Municipality

Government
  - Mayor: Mario Núñez S. (2010–15)

Area
  - Total: 286 sq mi (741 km^{2})
- Elevation: 6,820 ft (2,080 m)

Population (2001)
  - Total: 7.241
- Time zone: UTC-4 (BOT)

Sopachuy is a town located in Tomina Province in the Chuquisaca Department in south-central Bolivia. It is the seat of the municipality of the same name. At the time of the 2001 census, the municipality had 7,241 inhabitants.

Sopachuy was founded on 30 October 1581, and was the site of the Battle of Sopachuy in 1817.
