= Huacalera =

Coordinates: 23°26′S 65°21′W

- Municipality and town
- Interactive map of Huacalera
- Country: Argentina
- Province: Jujuy Province
- Time zone: UTC−3 (ART)

Huacalera is a town and municipality in Jujuy Province in Argentina.
