= Battle of Curapalihue =

Coordinates: 36°51′56″S 72°42′57″W

- Part of the Chilean War of Independence and the Argentine War of Independence
| Date | April 4, 1817 |
| Location | Near Concepción, Chile |
| Result | Patriot victory |

Belligerents
| Chile; United Provinces | Spain |

Commanders and leaders
| Juan de Las Heras | Juan José Campillo |

Strength
| 600 soldiers | 500 infantry 100 cavalry |

Casualties and losses
| Minimal | 10 killed 7 captured |

The Battle of Curapalihue (4 April 1817) fought in Chile, was a minor encounter between South American rebels and Spanish royalists, during the South American wars of independence. The result was a defeat for the royalists.

== Background ==
After the defeat of Chacabuco and the capture of Santiago by the Army of the Andes, the royalist forces concentrated around Concepción under Colonel José Ordóñez. General José de San Martín ordered Colonel Juan Gregorio de Las Heras to take command of a division and move south. When Colonel Ordóñez heard of the approach of the patriot army, he decided to stage a surprise night attack against them.

== The battle ==
The Spanish forces, under the command of Lieutenant Colonel Juan José Campillo, were composed of 500 infantry and 100 cavalry. They attacked at 1:30 AM, but their surprise was foiled and they had to retreat very soon leaving behind 10 soldiers dead and 7 prisoners, while the patriot forces suffered almost no casualties.
