= Acoyte, Salta =

Coordinates: 22°17′S 65°01′W

Acoyte (Salta)
- Municipality and village
- Interactive map of Acoyte (Salta)
- Country: Argentina
- Province: Salta
- Department: Santa Victoria Department

Population (2001)
  - Total: 111
- Time zone: UTC−3 (ART)
- Postal code: A4651
- Area code: 03885
- Climate: BSk

Acoyte (Salta) is a village and rural municipality in Salta Province in northwestern Argentina.

It is found 9 kilometers west of Santa Victoria.

== Seismicity ==
In the Salta Province, earthquakes range from high frequency to low frequency.
