= Argentine War of Independence =

Secessionist civil war (1810–1825)

- Part of the Spanish American wars of independence
- From top and left: Crossing of the Andes, Battle of Salta, 22 May 1810 Open Cabildo, Battle of San Lorenzo, Battle of Suipacha, 1813 Assembly, Shooting of Liniers, Jujuy Exodus.
Date	25 May 1810 – 7 April 1825 (14 years, 10 months, 1 week and 6 days)
Location	the entire Spanish empire, especially the territories that modern-day form part of: Argentina, Chile, Uruguay, Paraguay, Bolivia, Peru and Ecuador
Result	Argentine victory

Belligerents
Patriots; United Provinces of the Río de la Plata; Federal League Kingdom of Chile (1811); Republic of Chile; Republiquetas	Royalists: Kingdom of Spain and the Indies (the Spains); Kingdom of Spain; Kingdom of Peru; Viceroyalty of the Río de la Plata; Captaincy General of Chile; Intendancy of Paraguay (1810–1811); Kingdom of Portugal (1811–1812)

Commanders and leaders
Northern Front; Manuel Belgrano; Juan Castelli; González Balcarce; Martín de Güemes; Juana Azurduy Eastern Front; William Brown; Hipólito Bouchard; José Rondeau; José Artigas Andes Front; José de San Martín; Juan de las Heras; Bernardo O'Higgins	Northern Front; J. de Goyeneche; Córdoba y Rojas; Pío de Tristán; J. de la Pezuela; Pedro Olañeta Eastern Front; Gaspar de Vigodet; F.J. de Elío; J. de Romarate; Prince John Andes Front; Mariano Osorio; Rafael Maroto; José Ordóñez

Units involved
Army of Peru; Regiment of Mounted Grenadiers; Army of the Andes; Republiquetas, gauchos and other soldiers	Royal Army of Peru from Viceroyalty of Perú; Montevido Navy and Urban Militias: Others from: Expeditionary forces from Spain

The Argentine War of Independence (Spanish: guerra de la independencia argentina) was a set of military events from 1810 to 1825 which resulted in the consolidation of Argentina as an independent country from Spanish rule. The historiographical term encompasses battles and military feats such as the Crossing of the Andes. Formal independence was declared in 1816 by the Congress of Tucumán.

== Background ==
The territory of modern Argentina was part of the Spanish Viceroyalty of the Río de la Plata, with its capital city in Buenos Aires, seat of government of the Spanish viceroy. Modern Uruguay, Paraguay and Bolivia were also part of the viceroyalty, and began their push for autonomy during the conflict, becoming independent states afterwards. The vast area of the territory and slow communications led most populated areas to remain isolated from each other. The wealthiest regions of the viceroyalty were in Upper Peru (modern-day Bolivia). Salta and Córdoba had closer ties with Upper Peru than with Buenos Aires. Similarly, Mendoza in the west had closer ties with the Captaincy General of Chile, although the Andes mountain range was a natural barrier. Buenos Aires and Montevideo, who had a local rivalry, located in the La Plata Basin, had naval communications allowing them to be more in contact with European ideas and economic advances than the inland populations living in provinces such as Tierra del Fuego and Chaco. Paraguay was isolated from all other regions.

In the political structure most authoritative positions were filled by people designated by the Spanish monarchy, most of them Spanish people from Europe, also known as peninsulares, without a strong commitment for South American problems or interests. This created a growing rivalry between the Criollos, white people born in Latin America, and the peninsulares, Spanish people who arrived from Europe (the term "Criollo" is usually translated to English as "Creole", despite being unrelated to most other Creole peoples). Although they were all considered Spanish, and there were no legal distinctions between Criollos and Peninsulares, most Criollos thought that Peninsulares had undue influence in political matters. The ideas of the American and French Revolutions, and the Age of Enlightenment, promoted desires of social change among the criollos. The full prohibition imposed by Spain to trade with other nations was also seen as damaging to the viceroyalty's economy.

The population of Buenos Aires was highly militarized during the British invasions of the Río de la Plata, part of the Anglo-Spanish War. Buenos Aires was captured in 1806, and then liberated by Santiago de Liniers with forces from Montevideo. Fearing a counter-attack, all the population of Buenos Aires capable of bearing arms was arranged in military bodies, including slaves. A new British attack in 1807 captured Montevideo, but was defeated in Buenos Aires, and forced to leave the viceroyalty. The viceroy Rafael de Sobremonte was successfully deposed by the criollos during the conflict, and the Regiment of Patricians became a highly influential force in local politics, even after the end of the British threat.

The transfer of the Portuguese Court to Brazil generated military concern. It was feared that the British would launch a third attack, this time allied with Portugal. However, no military conflict took place, as when the Peninsular War started Britain and Portugal became allies of Spain against France. When the Spanish king Ferdinand VII was captured, his sister Carlota Joaquina sought to rule in the Americas as regent, but nothing came out of it because of the lack of support from both the Spanish Americans and the British. Javier de Elío created a Junta in Montevideo and Martín de Álzaga sought to make a similar move by organizing a mutiny in Buenos Aires, but the local military forces intervened and thwarted it. Spain appointed a new viceroy, Baltasar Hidalgo de Cisneros, and Liniers handed the government to him without resistance, despite the proposals of the military to reject him.

=== The Revolution ===
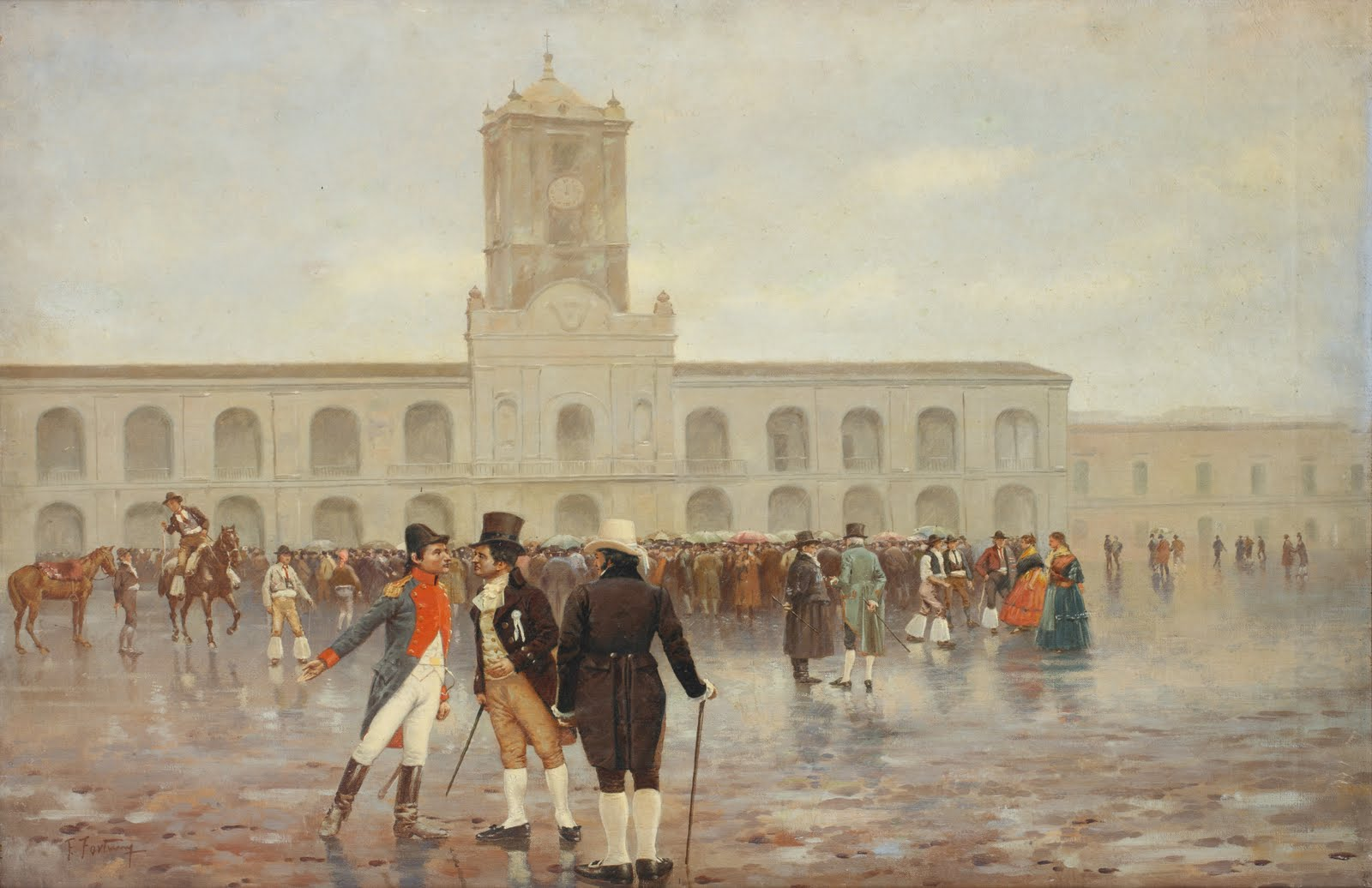
The May Revolution forced the viceroy to resign. He was replaced by a government Junta, the Primera Junta.

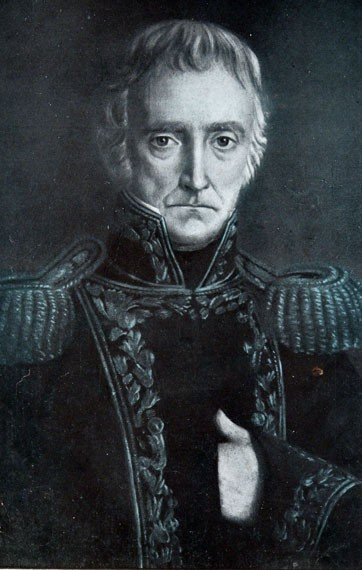
Cornelio Saavedra, chairman of the Primera Junta.

The military conflict in Spain worsened by 1810. The city of Seville had been invaded by French armies, which were already dominating most of the Iberian Peninsula. The Junta of Seville was disestablished, and several members fled to Cádiz, the last portion of Spain still resisting. They established a Council of Regency, prelude to the Cortes of Cadiz, with political tendencies closer to Liberalism and Popular sovereignty than the former Junta of Seville. This began the May Revolution in Buenos Aires, as soon as the news was known. Several citizens thought that Cisneros, appointed by the disestablished Junta, did not have the right to rule anymore, and requested the convening of an open cabildo to discuss the fate of the local government. The military gave their support to the request, forcing Cisneros to accept. The discussion ruled the removal of viceroy Cisneros and his replacement with a government junta, but the cabildo attempted to keep Cisneros in power by appointing him president of such junta. Further demonstrations ensued, and the Junta was forced to resign immediately. It was replaced by a new one, the Primera Junta.

Buenos Aires requested the other cities in the viceroyalty to acknowledge the new Junta and send deputies. The precise purpose of these deputies, join the Junta or create a congress, was unclear at the time and generated political disputes later. The Junta was initially resisted by all the main locations around Buenos Aires: Córdoba, Montevideo, Paraguay and the Upper Peru. Santiago de Liniers came out of his retirement in Córdoba and organized an army to capture Buenos Aires, Montevideo had naval supremacy over the city, and Vicente Nieto organized the actions at the Upper Peru. Nieto proposed to José Fernando de Abascal y Sousa, viceroy of the Viceroyalty of Peru at the North, to annex the Upper Peru to it. He thought that the revolution could be easily contained in Buenos Aires, before launching a definitive attack.

Buenos Aires was declared a rogue city by the Council of Regency, which appointed Montevideo as capital of the viceroyalty of the Río de la Plata, and Francisco Javier de Elío the new viceroy. However, the May Revolution was not initially separatist. Patriots supported the legitimacy of the Juntas in the Americas, while royalists supported instead the Council of Regency; both acted on behalf of Ferdinand VII. All of them believed that, according to the retroversion of the sovereignty to the people, in the absence of the rightful king sovereignty returned to the people, which would be capable to appoint their own leaders. They did not agree on who was that people, and which territorial extension had the sovereignty. Royalists thought that it applied to the people on European Spain, who had the right to rule over all the Spanish empire. The leaders of the May Revolution thought that it applied to all the capitals of Spanish kingdoms. José Gervasio Artigas would lead later a third perspective: the retroversion applied to all regions, which should remain united under a confederative system. The three groups battled one another, but the disputes about the national organization of Argentina (either centralist or confederal) continued in Argentine Civil War, for many years after the end of the war of independence.

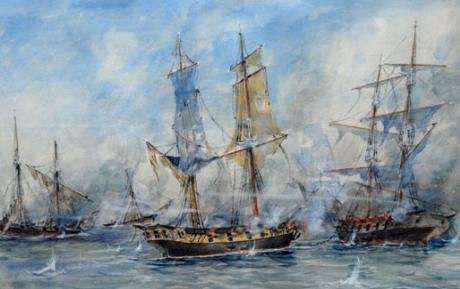
Battle of San Nicolás.

== Armed conflict ==
The Primera Junta sent military campaigns in the viceroyalty, in order to secure support to the new authorities and retain the authority held as the capital of the viceroyalty. The victories and defeats of the military conflict delimited the areas of influence of the new United Provinces of the Río de la Plata. With the non-aggression pact arranged with Paraguay early on, most of the initial conflict took place in the north, in Upper Peru, and in the east, in the Banda Oriental. In the second half of the decade, with the capture of Montevideo and the stalemate in Upper Peru, the conflict moved to the west, to Chile.

=== Initial campaigns ===
The first two military campaigns ordered by the revolutionary Junta in Buenos Aires were launched against Cordoba, where former Viceroy Santiago de Liniers organized a counter-revolution, and the Intendency of Paraguay, which did not recognize the outcome of events at the May Revolution.

However, the improvised army gathered by Liniers at Cordoba deserted him before battle, so the former Viceroy attempted to flee to the Upper Peru, expecting to join the royalist army sent from the Viceroyalty of Peru to suffocate the revolution at Buenos Aires. Colonel Francisco Ortiz de Ocampo, who led the patriot army, captured Liniers and the other leaders of the Cordoba counter-revolution on 6 August 1810, but, instead of executing them as he was instructed, he sent them back to Buenos Aires as prisoners. As a result, Ocampo was demoted and Juan José Castelli was appointed as the political head of the army. On 26 August, Castelli executed the Cordoba prisoners and led the Army of the North towards the Upper Peru:

- First Upper Peru campaign (1810–1811)

After securing the loyalty of the northwestern Provinces to the May Revolution through elections of representatives to the Junta in Buenos Aires, Castelli sent General Antonio González Balcarce into the Upper Peru, but he was defeated at the battle of Cotagaita. Castelli then sent him reinforcements, leading to the first patriotic victory at the battle of Suipacha, which gave Buenos Aires control over the Upper Peru. The royalist generals Vicente Nieto, Francisco de Paula Sanz and José de Córdoba y Rojas were captured and executed.

Castelli then proposed to the Buenos Aires Junta to cross the Desaguadero River, taking the offensive into the Viceroyalty of Peru domains, but his proposal was rejected. His army and Goyeneche's stationed near the frontier, while negotiating. Goyeneche advanced and defeated Castelli at the Battle of Huaqui, whose forces dispersed and left the provinces. The resistance of patriot republiqueta guerrillas of Upper Peru, however, kept the royalists at bay, hampering any serious advance to the south:

- Paraguay campaign (1810–1811)

The other militia sent by Buenos Aires was commanded by Manuel Belgrano and made its way up the Paraná River towards the Intendency of Paraguay. A first battle was fought at Campichuelo, where the patriots claimed victory. However, they were completely overwhelmed at the subsequent battles of Paraguarí and Tacuarí. Thus, this campaign ended in failure as well from a military point of view; however, some months later, inspired on the Argentine example, Paraguay broke its links with the Spanish crown by declaring itself an independent nation:

- First Banda Oriental campaign (1811)

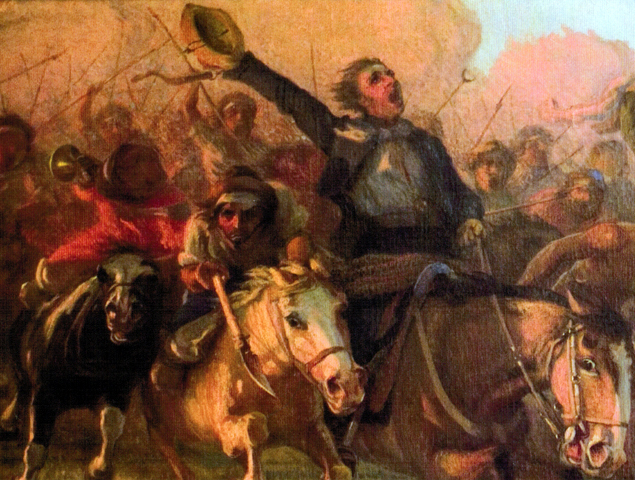
Horse riding in Asencio

=== Renewed offensives ===
The undesired outcomes of the Paraguay and Upper Peru campaigns led the Junta to be replaced by an executive Triumvirate in September 1811. This new government decided to promote a new campaign to the Upper Peru with a reorganized Army of the North and appointed José de San Martín, a veteran of the Napoleonic Wars who had recently arrived from Spain, as lieutenant colonel. San Martín was ordered to create the professional and disciplined cavalry unit known as Regiment of Mounted Grenadiers (Spanish: Granaderos a caballo):

- Second Upper Peru campaign (1812–1813)

General Manuel Belgrano was appointed as the new commander of the Army of the North. Facing the overwhelming invasion of a royalist army led by General Pío de Tristán, Belgrano turned to scorched-earth tactics and ordered the evacuation of the people of Jujuy and Salta, and the burning of anything else left behind to prevent enemy forces from getting supplies or taking prisoners from those cities. This action is known as the Jujuy Exodus.

Turning against the Triumvirate orders, however, Belgrano decided to fight the royalists at Tucumán, obtaining a great victory and then decisively defeating the royalist army at the Battle of Salta, in northwestern Argentina, forcing the bulk of the royalist army to surrender their weapons. Tristán (a former fellow student with Belgrano at Salamanca University) and his men were granted amnesty and released. Then again, the patriot army was defeated into the Upper Peru at the battles of Vilcapugio and Ayohuma and retreated to Jujuy:

- Second Banda Oriental campaign (1812–1814)

In early 1812, the truce between Buenos Aires and Montevideo was over, and Manuel de Sarratea led an army to the Banda Oriental, but he was soon replaced by José Rondeau, who initiated a second siege of Montevideo. Although royalist Gaspar de Vigodet sought to break the siege, he was defeated at the Battle of Cerrito.

The Spanish navy then sought to evade the land blockade by raiding nearby populations on the west bank of the Uruguay river. On 31 January 1813, Spanish troops from Montevideo landed near the town of San Lorenzo, Santa Fe Province, but it was absolutely defeated by the Granaderos unit led by San Martín on February 3. The Battle of San Lorenzo ended further Spanish raids on the west bank of the Paraná river and the Triumvirate awarded San Martín the rank of general.

The Granaderos unit was instrumental in the Revolution of October 8, 1812 which deposed the government and installed a new Triumvirate, considered to be more committed to the cause of Independence. In fact, this second Triumvirate convened a national assembly which was meant to declare Independence. The Assembly, however, first decided replace the Triumvirate with a new unipersonal Executive office, the Supreme Director of the United Provinces of the Río de la Plata, and elected Gervasio Antonio de Posadas for that role.

One of the first actions of Posadas was to create a naval fleet from scratch, which was to be financed by Juan Larrea, and appointed William Brown as lieutenant colonel and chief commander of it, on March 1, 1814. Against all the odds, on 14 May 1814 the improvised patriot navy engaged the Spanish fleet and defeated it three days later. This action secured the port of Buenos Aires and allowed the fall of Montevideo, which could not stand the siege any more, on 20 June 1814.

=== The march towards Independence ===
The fall of Montevideo eliminated the royalist menace from the Banda Oriental and meant the actual end of the Spanish Viceroyalty of the Río de la Plata. Soon afterwards, William Brown was awarded the rank of admiral, and Carlos María de Alvear, who was put in charge of the siege of Montevideo just a few days before the surrender of the city, succeeded his uncle Gervasio Posadas as the Supreme Director of the United Provinces, on January 11, 1815. Alvear, however, was resisted by the troops, so he was quickly replaced, on April 21, by Ignacio Álvarez Thomas through a mutiny. Álvarez Thomas then appointed Alvear as general of the Northern Army, in replacement of José Rondeau, but the officiality did not recognize this and remained loyal to Rondeau:

- Third Upper Peru campaign (1815)

In 1815, the Northern Army, unofficially commanded by José Rondeau, started another offensive campaign in the Upper Peru, without the formal authorization of Supreme Director Álvarez Thomas. Lacking official support, however, the army was faced with anarchy. Moreover, soon after it would lose as well the aid of the Provincial Army of Salta, commanded by Martín Miguel de Güemes. After the defeats of Venta y Media (October 21) and Sipe-Sipe (November 28), the northern territories of the Upper Peru were effectively lost to the United Provinces. However, the Spanish Army could not advance further south as they were successfully stopped at Salta by the Güemes guerrillas from then on.

The unsuccessful outcome of the third Upper Peru campaign would spread rumors in Europe that the May Revolution was over. Furthermore, King Ferdinand VII was restored to the Spanish throne in 1813, so an urgent decision was needed regarding the political status of the United Provinces.

On July 9, 1816, an assembly of representatives of the Provinces (including three Upper Peru departments but excluding representatives from Santa Fe, Entre Ríos, Corrientes and the Banda Oriental, united into the Federal League) met at the Congress of Tucumán and declared the Independence of the United Provinces in South America from the Spanish Crown, with provisions for a national Constitution.

=== Army of the Andes (1814–1818) ===
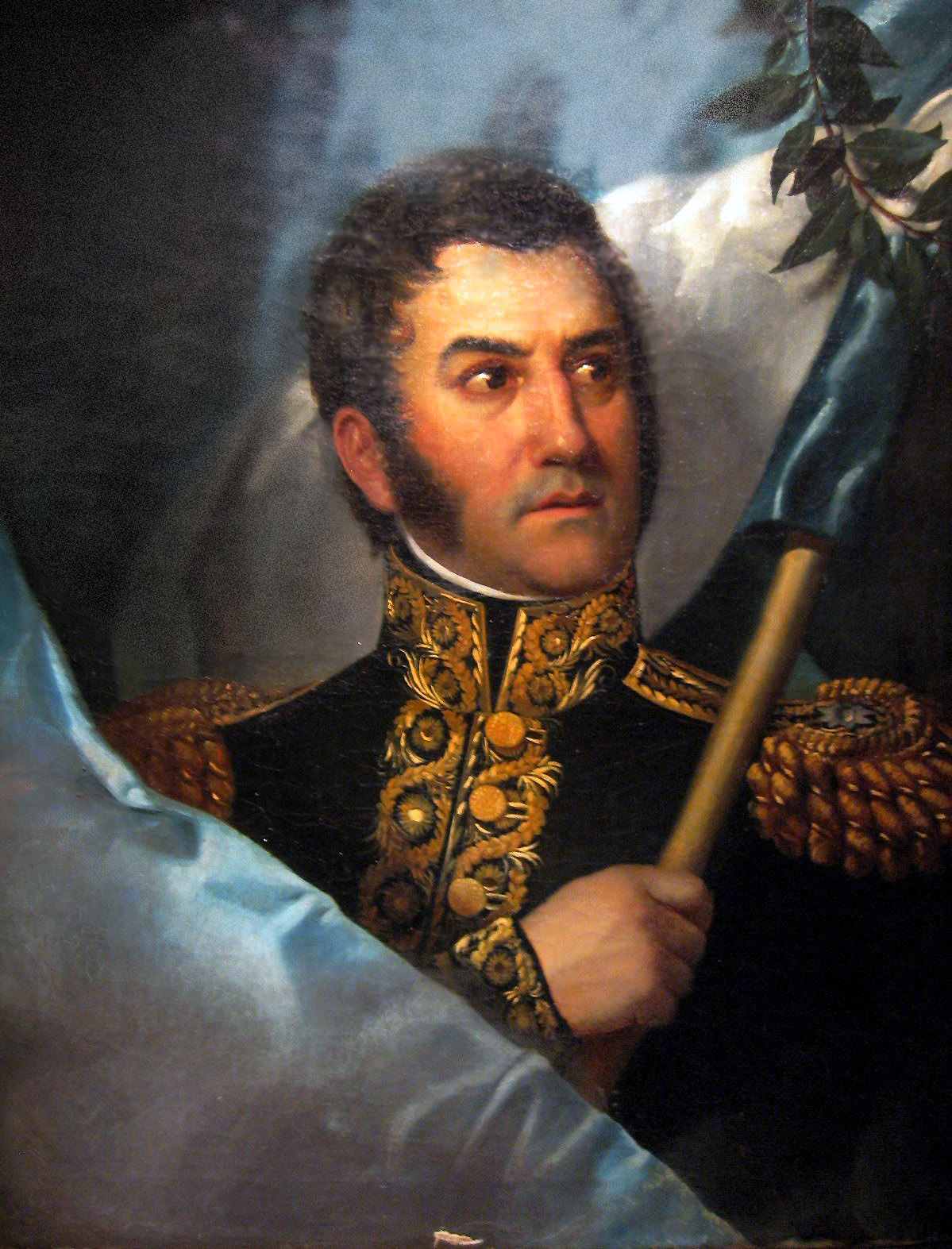
San Martín wrapped in the flag.

In 1814, General José de San Martín had taken command of the Army of the North to prepare a new invasion of the Upper Peru. However, he quickly resigned as he foresaw yet another defeat. Instead, he developed a new strategy to attack the Viceroyalty of Perú through the Captaincy of Chile, inspired on the writings of Sir Thomas Maitland, who was quoted as saying that the only way to defeat the Spanish at Quito and Lima was attacking Chile first.

San Martín asked to become the Governor of the Province of Cuyo, where he prepared the Chile campaign. Installed in the city of Mendoza, San Martín reorganized the Granaderos cavalry unit into the Army of the Andes, which he created out of patriots from both the United Provinces and exiles from Chile.

In early 1817, San Martín led the crossing of the Andes into Chile, obtaining a decisive victory at the battle of Chacabuco on February 17, 1817, and took Santiago de Chile, where he refused the offer of the governorship of Chile in favour of Bernardo O'Higgins (who became supreme director) because he did not wish to be diverted from his main objective, the capture of Lima. O'Higgins installed a new independent government. In December 1817, a popular referendum was set up to decide about the Independence of Chile.

However, royalist resistance persisted in southern Chile, allied with the Mapuches. On April 4, Argentine Colonel Juan Gregorio de Las Heras had occupied Concepción, but the royalists retreated to Talcahuano. In early 1818, royalist reinforcements from the Viceroyalty of Peru arrived, commanded by general Mariano Osorio, and advanced towards the capital. San Martín then turned to scorched earth tactics and ordered the evacuation of Concepción, which he thought was impossible to defend. On 18 February 1818, the first anniversary of the battle of Chacabuco, Chile declared its independence from the Spanish Crown.

On March 18, 1818, Osorio led a surprise attack on the joint Argentine-Chilean army, which had to retreat to Santiago, with heavy losses. In fact, among the confusion, Supreme Director O'Higgins was thought to be killed, and panic seized the patriot camp. Crippled after his defeat at Cancha Rayada, O'Higgins delegated the command of the troops entirely to San Martín in a meeting on the plains of Maipú. Then, on April 5, 1818, San Martín inflicted a decisive defeat on Osorio in the Battle of Maipú, after which the depleted royalists retreated to Concepcion, never again to launch a major offensive against Santiago.

The Chile campaign is generally considered to be the conclusion of the Argentine War of Independence, as the further actions of the United Army into Peru were carried on under the authority of the Chilean government, not the United Provinces. However, defensive actions continued to be carried on in the northern frontier of the United Provinces until the 1825 Battle of Ayacucho, which ended the royalist threat from the Upper Peru.

== Independence and Aftermath (1816–1831) ==
During the War of Independence, Argentina declared its independence from Spain. A congressional representative meeting, convened under the name of the Congress of Tucumán, met in San Miguel de Tucumán on behalf of the United Provinces of South America, which comprised Argentina, Uruguay, and parts of Bolivia, in 1816. The La Independencia de Argentina on July 9, 1816, solidified the United Provinces of South America and pushed for the beginning of an era of self-government for the nation. The Acta de la Declaración de la Independencia Argentina cites God as the witness to the provinces’ unified decision to break the “unnatural bounds” imposed by Spain and King Ferdinand VII, pledging their lives, property, and honor to uphold their conviction in seeking freedom.

During the war with Spain, the conversation centered on how the new government would operate without the Spanish Crown. One aspect of the discussion focused on the church's role. The 1816 Congress of Tucumán showed a strong tendency toward church authority in government, with over a third of the signatories being priests. Much like many other Latin American countries, the Conservative and Liberal parties created heavy debates in Argentina’s politics. Conservatives, who generally favored a strong centralized government and the traditional authority of the Catholic church, while Liberal politics argued for moderate views, land reforms, challenging the class structure, and opposing the dominance of the church. Amid these debates, the Congress’s choice of leadership reflected a broader struggle over political identity and structure.

The Congress of Tucumán named Buenos Aires the capital of the United Provinces. The Congress would also have its first elected official after the Argentine Declaration of Independence, Juan Martín de Pueyrredón. Appointed July 9, 1816, Pueyrredón would succeed Antonio González de Balcarce as Supreme Director of the United Provinces of the Río de la Plata. During his term, Juan Martín de Pueyrredón would implement different political structures and policies, leaning more towards conservative values. His actions as Supreme Director ensured continued focus on the war effort against Spain. While Argentina had declared independence, the war with Spain continued, especially in Chile. On April 17, 1818, General San Martín had decisively defeated the royalists at the Battle of Maipú, marking a significant victory for both Chile's independence and also the preservation of Argentina's. In addition to maintaining the campaign, Pueyrredón would work towards a centralized, federal government in Buenos Aires to preserve order and stability.

Juan Martín de Pueyrredón would resign at the end of his term in June 1819, and José Rondeau would become the Supreme Director on June 10, 1819. José Rondeau would serve a short sentence until February 11, 1820, when he was replaced by Juan Pedro Aguirre.

The 1820s saw rapid political change in Buenos Aires. This turbulence was intensified as competing provincial forces struggled to define the nation’s political future. The Argentine Civil Wars began in 1814, emerging around the same time as the broader fight for independence, and causing sporadic and fluctuating conflicts, disrupting the formation of a government until 1880. One of the political factions competing to influence the provinces was the Unitarian Party. The Unitarians advocated a centralized government based in Buenos Aires and opening the country to international trade. The first federalist group agreed with the Unitarians on the nationalization of Buenos Aires, but wanted it to retain its provincial autonomy. In contrast, the other federalist group opposed nationalization but agreed on free trade. Alongside the struggle for political supremacy, the disapproval of the Constitution of 1819 added to the discourse. Drafted under Pueyrredón as Supreme Director, a Congress of largely porteño commission wrote the 1819 Constitution for the “United Provinces of South America." The provinces overwhelmingly rejected it due to its centralizing features, objections to border changes, a call for only a provisional central authority, effects on autonomy, demands for a temporary government, objections to Buenos Aires’s monarchical leanings, and its cooperation with the Portuguese. The political tension between the two parties would intensify into violence over the political dominance of their respective parties. In the Battle of Cepeda in 1820, caudillos Estanislao López and Francisco Ramírez defeated the Buenos Aires Jose Rondeau. The Battle of Cepeda ended in a federalist victory, which rejected the 1819 Constitution and led to the Treaty of Pilar. The treaty called for the end of hostility between the provinces, guaranteed amnesty, ensured free river navigation, and provided for a future federal congress, signed by the governors of Buenos Aires, Santa Fe, and Entre Ríos on February 23, 1820.

Juan Pedro Aguirre would become Supreme Director after Rondeau's defeat, with a term lasting a period of 10 days, and served as the last Supreme Director of the United Provinces of the Río de la Plata. The role of the governor of Buenos Aires would subsequently replace the elected position of the Supreme Director. After many short-lived terms and interim governors, Martín Rodríguez was elected governor in September 1820 until April 1824. Bernardino Rivadavia would serve Alongside Rodríguez as the chief minister. The Rodríguez administration focused on local projects rather than national governance, as Buenos Aires had transitioned to being a province like the others after the battle. Yet the province-centered focus of the Rodríguez administration soon collided with rising international tensions.

The Cisplatine War was a conflict between Argentina and Brazil over the disputed territory of the Cisplatine province. The conflict raised concerns for Argentina about international relations, alliances, the risk of a wider war, and the fear that Brazil was acting as a tool of European monarchies. After the Cisplatine War broke out, the Buenos Aires-controlled Congress made Bernardino Rivadavia, formerly a provincial minister, the first President of the United Provinces. Rivadavia’s administration would take a liberal approach to the government of Argentina, focusing on centralization, elite control, free-trade liberalism, subordination of the interior provinces, and the proposition of a new constitution. However, his policies were met with disdain. The rejection of the new constitution, military setbacks in the Cisplatine War against Brazil, and the Battle of Rincón de Valladares against Federalists during the Argentine Civil War forced Rivadavia to resign in 1827. The Cisplatine War would end in 1828 with the Cisplatine province becoming the Republic of Uruguay. While the external conflict with Brazil came to a close, the political strife within Argentina would continue.

The conflict between the Unitarian and Federalist parties over political dominance persisted after the Battle of Rincón de Valladares. During these conflicts in the late 1820s, Juan Manuel de Rosas would rise to power through the federalist party. Rosas was originally a Buenos Aires cattle rancher and the province's governor in 1829. After being elected governor, he would begin seeking more control over the country. Rosas would achieve his goal through military coercion as a caudillo, eventually through enforcement by the Mazorea, and through policies of land consolidation by the aristocracy and federalist ideology. Juan Manuel de Rosas would create the Argentine Confederation in 1831 and remain the dictator until 1852.

== Annual commemoration ==
The Día de la Revolución de Mayo (May Revolution Day) on May 25 is an annual holiday in Argentina to commemorate the First National Government (and the creation of the Primera Junta), one of the significant events in the history of Argentina. These and other events of the week leading to this day are referred to as the Semana de Mayo (May Week). Equally July 9th, the date in 1816 during the Congress of Tucuman when the formal declaration of independence from Spain was signed, is a national holiday celebrated as Día de la Independencia (Independence Day) The celebration of the Argentina Centennial and the Argentina Bicentennial took place nevertheless in 1910 and 2010.

== See also ==
- Spanish American wars of independence
- Rise of the Argentine Republic
- United Provinces of the Río de la Plata
- Timeline of the Argentine War of Independence
- List of Argentine War of Independence battles
- Argentine Irredentism

== Bibliography ==
- Camogli, Pablo; Luciano de Privitellio (2005). Batallas por la Libertad. Buenos Aires: Aguilar. ISBN 987-04-0105-8.
- Luna, Félix (2003). La independencia argentina y americana (in Spanish). Buenos Aires: Planeta. ISBN 950-49-1110-2.
