= Second Upper Peru campaign =

1812–1813 military campaign

- Part of Argentine War of Independence
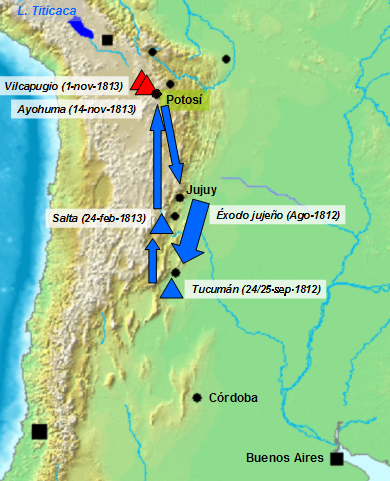
- Path of the second campaign. The blue mark is for patriot victories (Tucumán and Salta), the red mark for royalist victories (Vilcapugio and Ayohuma)
Date	1812–1813
Location	Upper Peru
Result	Royalist victory (Note: Historiography uses the terms royalists and patriots to refer to the territories that were loyal to the Council of Regency and Buenos Aires respectively. Belgrano, for his part, was committed to achieving full independence.)

Belligerents
United Provinces (patriots)	Viceroyalty of Peru (royalists)

Commanders and leaders
Manuel Belgrano; Eustaquio Díaz Vélez; Gregorio Aráoz de Lamadrid	Juan Pío de Tristán (surrendered); José Manuel de Goyeneche; Joaquín de la Pezuela; Juan Ramírez de Orozco

Units involved
Army of Peru	Royal Army of Peru

The Second Upper Peru campaign was an unsuccessful invasion in 1812-1813 by the rebel United Provinces of the Río de la Plata led by Manuel Belgrano, of Upper Peru (today Bolivia), which was still under control of Spanish troops.

== The campaign ==
The First Upper Peru campaign (1810-1811) had ended in failure when the Northern Army under command of Juan José Castelli had suffered a crushing defeat in the Battle of Huaqui, and was forced out of Upper Peru and retreated back to Jujuy.
The Junta in Buenos Aires decided in 1812 to carry out a second campaign to liberate Upper Peru. On 26 March 1812, Colonel Major Belgrano headed immediately towards Jujuy, where he found the Northern army in a sorry state. The revolutionary soldiers were demoralized, badly armed, isolated and facing an outbreak of malaria. His first task was to restore discipline and improve the material condition of the Northern Army.

Furthermore, a Loyalist army, led by General Pío Tristán, was advancing south with 3,000 troops into the northwest of Argentina, heading towards Jujuy. Belgrano realized that he did not have enough strength to defend the city, and on 23 August he ordered the evacuation of all the civilian population - roughly half the residents of San Salvador de Jujuy - to the interior of Tucumán Province, and the destruction of anything that could be of value to the royalists in a scorched earth retreat that was later known as the Jujuy Exodus.

Manuel Belgrano stopped his retreat at San Miguel de Tucumán and prepared for battle against the weakened Royalist army. He led the Northern Army to victory in the Battle of Tucuman (24 September 1812) and forced the Loyalists to retreat. He won a second victory at Salta in the north of present-day Argentina on 20 February 1813 and captured the entire Loyalist army.

Belgrano and his Northern army now advanced into Upper Peru (present-day Bolivia), but were stopped by superior forces under command of Joaquín de la Pezuela, in the battles of Vilcapugio (1 october 1813) and Ayohuma (14 November 1813).

The defeated Northern army retreated back to Jujuy. In January 1814, Manuel Belgrano was replaced by Colonel José de San Martín, arrested and prosecuted, but finally his merits were recognized and he was acquitted. San Martín, for health reasons, resigned four months later, being replaced by Colonel José Rondeau.

== Sources ==
- Museo Histórico Nacional : Revolution Time (EN_434)

== See also ==
- Argentine War of Independence
