= Portezuelo, Chile =

Portezuelo
- Commune
- Map of Portezuelo commune in the Ñuble Region

- Location in Chile
- Coordinates: 36°32′S 72°26′W
- Country: Chile
- Region: Ñuble
- Province: Itata

Government
  - Type: Municipality
  - Alcalde: Modesto Sepúlveda Andrade (PDC)

Area
  - Total: 282.3 km^{2} (109.0 sq mi)
- Elevation: 132 m (433 ft)

Population (2012 Census)
  - Total: 4,903
  - Density: 17.37/km^{2} (44.98/sq mi)
  - Urban: 1,750
  - Rural: 3,720

Sex
  - Men: 2,825
  - Women: 2,645
- Time zone: UTC-4 (CLT)
  - Summer (DST): UTC-3 (CLST)
- Area code: 56 + 42
- Website: Municipality of Portezuelo

Portezuelo (Spanish pronunciation: [poɾteˈswelo]) is a Chilean town and commune in the Itata Province, Ñuble Region.

== Demographics ==
According to the 2002 census of the National Statistics Institute, Portezuelo spans an area of 282.3 km^{2} (109 sq mi) with 5,470 inhabitants (2,825 men and 2,645 women). Of these, 1,750 (32%) lived in urban areas and 3,720 (68%) in rural areas. The population fell by 8.4% (500 persons) between the 1992 and 2002 censuses.

== Localities ==
- Quitento

== Administration ==
As a commune, Portezuelo is a third-level administrative division of Chile administered by a communal council, headed by an alcalde who is directly elected every four years. The 2008-2012 alcalde is Modesto Sepúlveda Andrade (PDC). The communal council has the following members:

- Paulina Zamudio (Ind./Pro-PDC)
- Daniel Pastén (UDI)
- Pedro Fernández (Ind./PDC)
- Flavio Barrientos (Ind./RN)
- Marcelo Cortés (PRI)
- Melitón Aravena (PDC)

Within the electoral divisions of Chile, Portezuel belongs to the 42nd electoral district and 12th senatorial constituency.

== See also ==
- List of towns in Chile
