= Third Upper Peru campaign =

1815 military campaign in South America

- Part of Argentine War of Independence
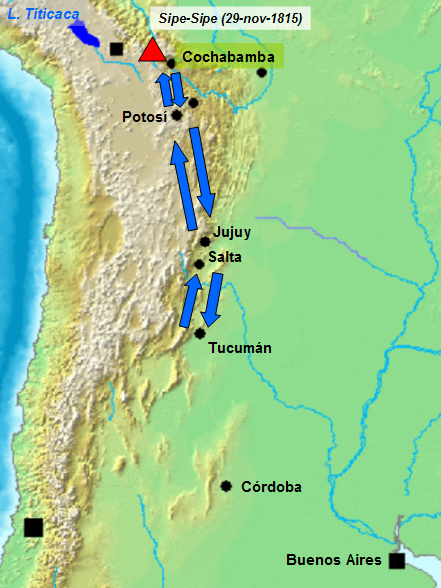
- Path of the third campaign. The red mark shows the location of the only major battle (Sipe Sipe or Viluma), a royalist victory.
| Date | 1815 |
| Location | Upper Peru |
| Result | Royalist victory |

Belligerents
| United Provinces | Viceroyalty of Peru |

Commanders and leaders
| José Casimiro Rondeau Pereyra; Martín Rodríguez; Gregorio Aráoz de Lamadrid; Martín Miguel de Güemes | José Manuel de Goyeneche; Joaquín de la Pezuela; Miguel Tacón; Pedro Antonio Olañeta |

Units involved
| Army of Peru | Royal Army of Peru |

The Third Upper Peru campaign was an unsuccessful invasion by the rebel United Provinces of the Río de la Plata, in 1815 during the Argentine War of Independence, of Upper Peru (today Bolivia), which was still under control of Spanish troops.

== The campaign ==
The first and second campaign had ended in failure, but had also weakened the Spanish troops in Upper Peru, who were forced to deal with local guerrillas in an attrition war.

The Army of the North, unofficially commanded by José Rondeau, started another campaign, but this time without the authorization of Supreme Director Ignacio Álvarez Thomas. With the lack of official support, the army faced anarchy and later would lose the aid of the Provincial Army of Salta, commanded by Martín Miguel de Güemes.

After a successful assault in April 1815 on a Royalist camp at Puesto del Marquéz, near today's border between Bolivia and Argentina, Rondeau's army reached Potosí by June and Chayanta by September. In October, an attempt to overrun a small Royalist garrison at Venta y Media ended in defeat. Despite this setback, the Army of the North occupied Cochabamba.

In the meantime, the weak situation of the over-extended Royal Army in Upper Peru had changed with the arrival of the reinforcement of a division under the command of Juan Ramírez Orozco and with the arrival of loyal troops from Chile. Pezuela now launched a counteroffensive against Rondeau, and inflicted a crushing defeat in the Battle of Sipe-Sipe (or Viluma) on 28 November.

Again, the Northern Army had to withdraw to Tucuman and all northern territories were lost. They were reannexed by the Spanish Viceroyalty of Peru, and later became present-day Bolivia. This unsuccessful outcome to the campaign would spread rumors in Europe that the May Revolution was over.

== See also ==
- Argentine War of Independence
