= Yavi =

Coordinates: 22°08′S 65°28′W

- Rural municipality and village
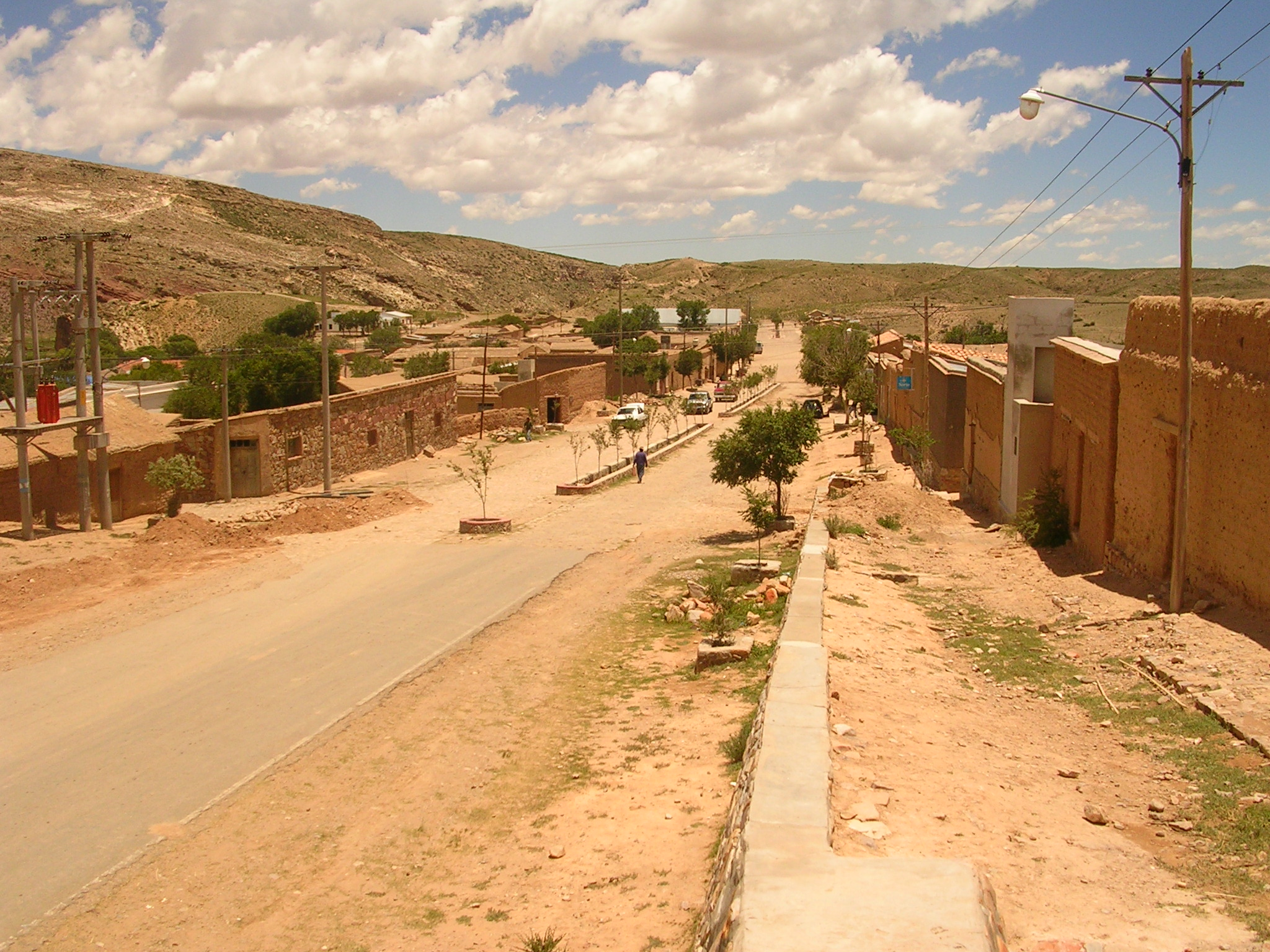
- Yavi
- Interactive map of Yavi
- Country: Argentina
- Province: Jujuy Province
- Time zone: UTC−3 (ART)

Yavi is a rural municipality and village in Jujuy Province in Argentina. Nearby is the site of the Battle of Yavi (1816) in Argentina's war of independence.
