= Republiquetas =

Quasi-states of the Bolivian War of Independence

The republiquetas were independence-seeking guerrilla groups of the Bolivian War of Independence during the first decades of the 19th century in South American history. Their first historiographical mention and description came from the historian and Argentine President Bartolomé Mitre.

After the defeat of the first auxiliary Argentine army at the Battle of Huaqui, an amalgam of urban republicans, peasants, and Argentine agents effectively occupied vast generally-rural areas of Upper Peru. The guerrillas received support from another three military expeditions from Argentina from 1813 to 1817, but all of them were eventually vanquished after a number of early successes. The largest cities were occupied only for brief periods, and eventually, nearly all of the guerrilla movements disbanded or were defeated by royalist forces before Marshal Antonio José de Sucre routed the remaining troops still loyal to the Spanish crown at the Battle of Tumusla in April 1825.

== List ==
- Republiqueta de Ayopaya
- Republiqueta de Cinti
- Republiqueta de La Laguna
- Republiqueta de Larecaja
- Republiqueta de Santa Cruz
- Republiqueta de Porco y Chayanta
- Republiqueta de Tarija
- Republiqueta de Vallegrande

== See also ==
- Republiqueta de Iquicha
