= Upper Peru =

Spanish colonial state in central South America (1821-25); present-day Bolivia

Upper Peru Alto Perú
- 1821–1825
- Flag Coat of arms
- Motto: Plus Ultra "Further Beyond"
- Anthem: Marcha Real "Royal March" (1813–1822; 1823–1873) Himno de Riego "Anthem of Riego" (1822–1823)
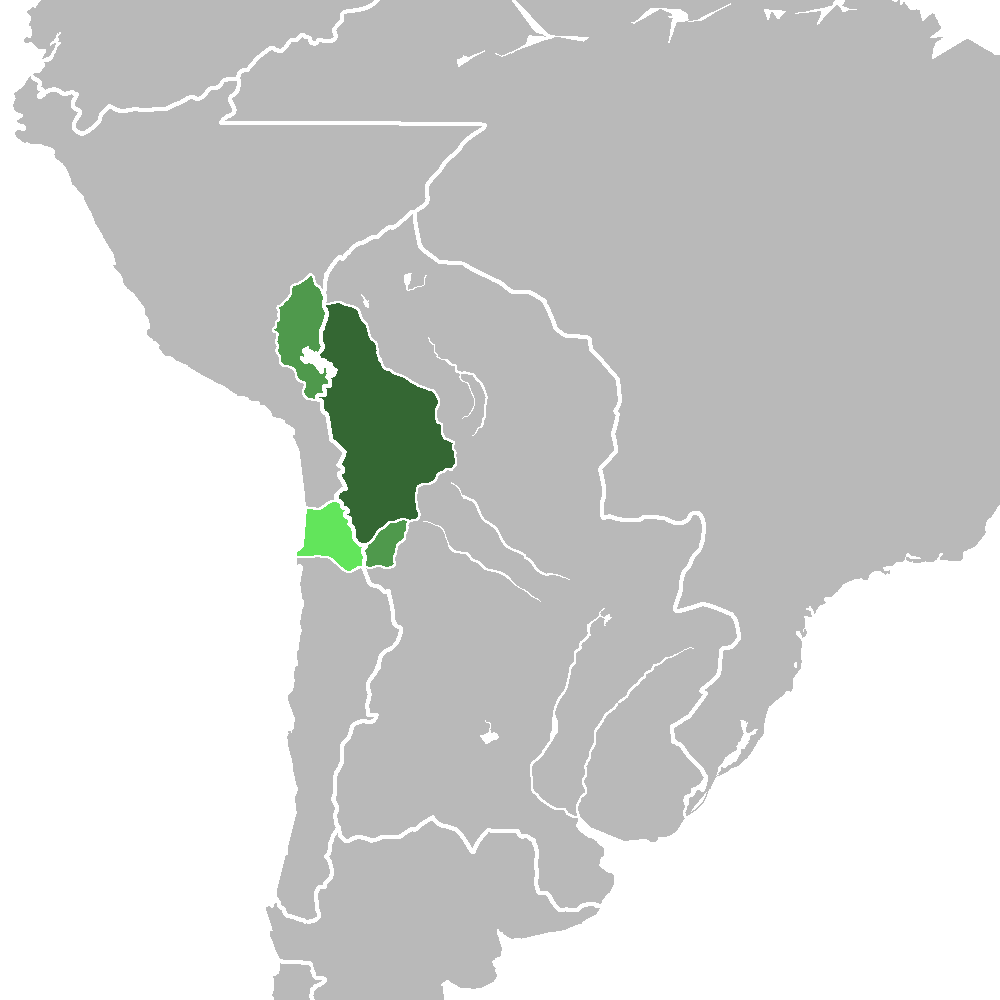
- Territories of Upper Peru, 1821–1825
- Capital: La Paz
- Common languages: Spanish
- Religion: Roman Catholic
- Government: Absolute monarchy (1821–1825)
- King/Queen
  - 1821–1825: Ferdinand VII
- Viceroy
  - 1821–1824: José de la Serna e Hinojosa
  - 1824–1825: Pío de Tristán
- History
  - Cortes of Cádiz: 28 July 1821
  - Independence from Spain as Bolivia: 6 August 1825
- Currency: Spanish dollar
Preceded by	Succeeded by
Viceroyalty of the Río de la Plata	Upper Peru

Upper Peru (Spanish: Alto Perú; Portuguese: Alto Peru) is a name for the land that was governed by the Real Audiencia of Charcas. The name originated in Buenos Aires towards the end of the 18th century after the Audiencia of Charcas was transferred from the Viceroyalty of Peru to the Viceroyalty of the Río de la Plata in 1776. It comprised the governorships of Potosí, La Paz, Cochabamba, Chiquitos, Moxos and Charcas (since renamed Sucre).

Following the Bolivian War of Independence, the region became an independent country and was renamed Bolivia in honor of Simón Bolívar.

== History ==
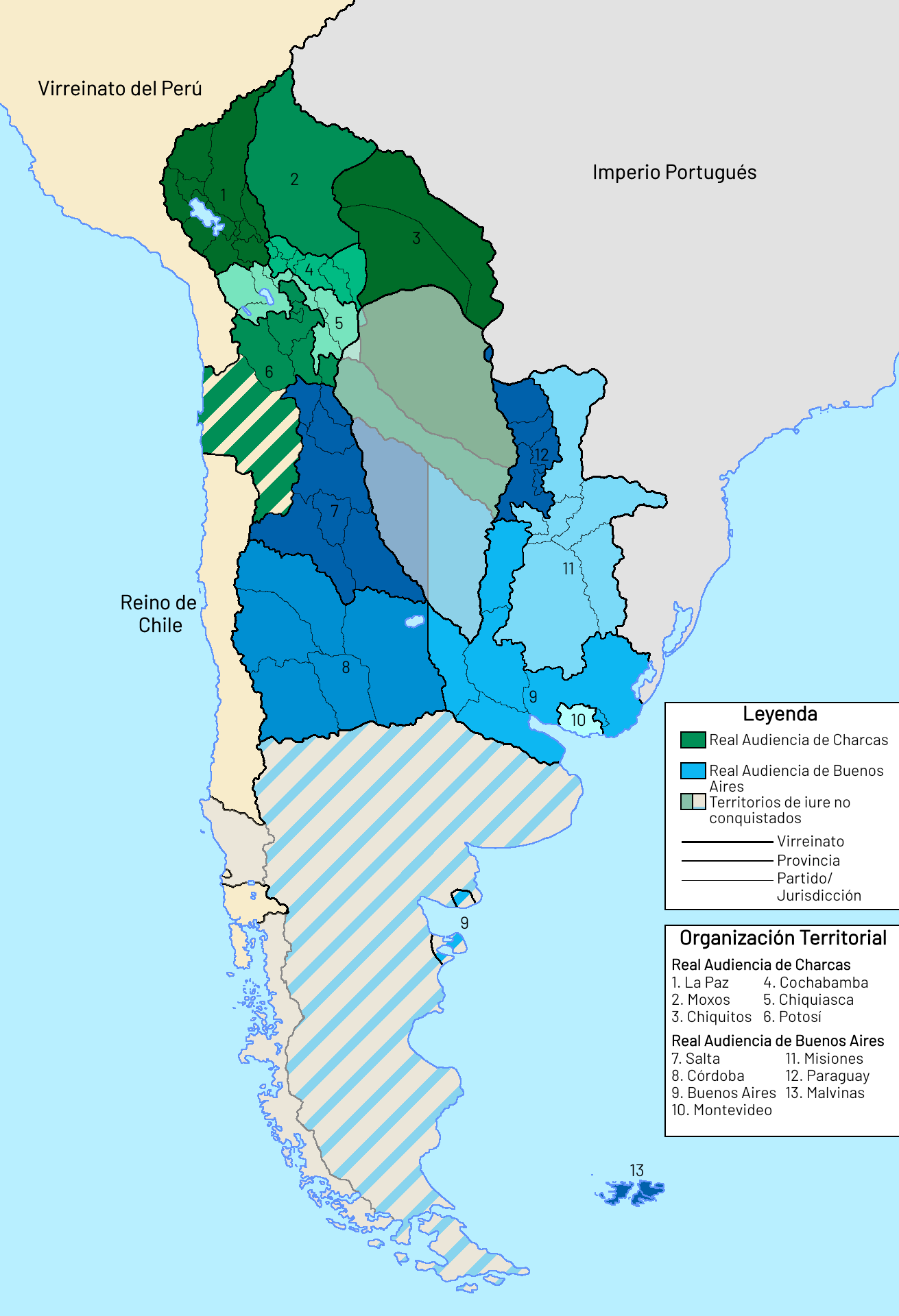
The territory of Upper Peru corresponds to Audiencia del Charcas

Following the defeat of Spanish Royalist forces at the Battle of Ayacucho in December 1824 and the effect collapse of Spanish power in Upper Peru, where royalist forces under General Pedro Antonio Olañeta were the last to resist, province governors scrambled in the ensuing power vacuum. In this context, the governor of Chiquitos, Colonel Sebastián Ramos, considered to have the province incorporated into Brazil, at least until Spanish sovereignty in South America was restored.

Fearing that the new revolutionary government would punish him, Ramos sent his adjunct, Captain José María de Velasco, to the Province of Mato Grosso, in the Empire of Brazil, in March 1825 to arrange for the occupation of Chiquitos into the Province of Mato Grosso. Despite Emperor Pedro I of Brazil not being informed and only three of the seven council members of Mato Grosso present, a treaty declaring the annexation of Chiquitos was passed in Mato Grosso in April.

In the following month, due to the disapproval of returning council members, the treaty between Mato Grosso and Chiquitos was annulled in May 1825 and the council ordered the troops to leave. Before the order arrived, an Indigenous uprising in the village of San Miguel forced them to retreat. Brazilian troops evacuated the province without clashing with revolutionary forces, looting was reported to have occurred by Brazilian forces during their retreat. Pedro I condemned the annexation in a letter written in August 1825, which reached Vila Bela only in November.

Generals Antonio Jose de Sucre and Simón Bolívar received reports of a Brazilian incursion into Chiquitos and Moxos (the latter of which only being a rumor) and believed it to be a local initiative rather than an action sanctioned by Brazil’s federal government, given that the expedition was led by a low-ranking retired lieutenant. While Sucre and Bolívar championed a peaceful resolution, they made clear that any attempt by Brazil to retain the province would be met with force, including the expulsion of Brazilian troops and Bolívar’s intention to spread the revolution into Mato Grosso and the rest of Brazil.

Over the following months, tensions between the provinces slowly decreased as looted goods were returned.

== Spanish conquest of Charcas ==
Initially, the province of Charcas was under the administration of the Viceroyalty of Peru until 1776 when the Viceroyalty of the Río de la Plata was established.

== As a Río de la Plata province ==
The Assembly of Buenos Aires advanced to the province of Charcas as part of the Viceroyalty of Río de la Plata and had elected representatives of the Provinces of Upper Peru for the Congress of the United Provinces of Río de la Plata.

== Counterrevolution ==
When the Viceroyalty of Río de la Plata gained independence, the Viceroy Abascal incorporated Upper Peru to the Viceroyalty of Peru including the province of Charcas.

== Colombian Occupation ==
Between 1823 and 1828 Colombian troops occupied Upper Peru with the leadership of Marshal Antonio José de Sucre, born in Cumaná, as the continuation of the Campaigns of the South. The Republic of Bolívar (based on the Upper Peru) was considered to be a satellite state of Gran Colombia.

== Claims by Argentina and Peru ==
Argentina and Peru claimed some territories of Upper Peru for historical reasons.
