= Francisco Xavier Bogarin =

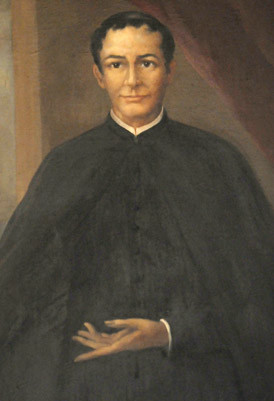
Francisco Javier Bogarin

Francisco Javier Bogarín (1763–unknown) was a Catholic priest and teacher who actively participated in the process of independence of Paraguay. Born in Carapeguá, Paraguarí Department, 66 kilometers from Asunción, in 1763. For a couple of months in 1811 he was a member of the five-man governing junta of Paraguay.

== Early life ==
Francisco's parents were Francisco Bogarín and María Paula Villamayor. He studied at the National University of Córdoba where he met two of the fathers of the Argentine independence, Juan José Paso and Mariano Medrano. He finished his Theology studies, was ordain into priesthood in 1784 and returned to the province of Paraguay.

Back in Asunción, Bogarín was appointed as Secretary of Chamber of Bishop Nicholas Videla del Pino. His career path soon crossed that of José Gaspar Rodríguez de Francia. On March 1, 1790 Juan Antonio de Zavala Professor of Theology and Dr. Francia, Professor of Theology complained to the governor about the appointment of Bogarin as the chair of Theology at San Carlos Seminary College. In 1796 he became the Chair of Philosophy.

Church was strongly involved in the political life of the colonial society. Due to their education Catholic priests were one of the best educated people in the provinces and exposed to the latest intellectual currents. So, it was no surprise that Bogarin was invited to participate in the provincial Congress of 1810, which was called by the provincial governor Bernardo de Velasco after the May Revolution in Buenos Aires. When it met on July 24, the Congress proclaimed continued loyalty to the king Ferdinand VII of Spain. This royalist rejection of May Revolution led to the Paraguay campaign during which Paraguayan troops were victorious over the forces sent by Buenos Aires. This military success and suspicions that governor Bernardo de Velasco is ready to ask for the Portuguese military protection led to the May 14, 1811 Revolution, which started the independence of Paraguay.

== Independence movement ==
Military officers who on the night of May 14 confronted governor Velasco succeeded in creating a three-man ruling junta which consisted of governor Velasco, Francia and Spanish-born army captain Juan Valeriano de Zeballos.

=== The fathers of the Paraguayan Independence ===
- Fulgencio Yegros
- Pedro Juan Caballero
- Vicente Ignacio Iturbe
- Mauricio José Troche
- Antonio Tomás Yegros
- Fernando de la Mora
- Mariano Antonio Molas
- Juan Bautista Rivarola

== After the Independence ==
From June 17 until June 20, 1811, the first National Congress met. It created a new five-man executive Junta Superior Gubernativa which was led by Fulgencion Yegros and also included Bogarin as representative of the clergy.

=== The First Junta ===
Junta started working on June 20 and one of its first achievements was a note sent to Buenos Aires on July 20 in which it expressed the will of Paraguay to be independent.

Francia resigned from junta claiming the growing influence of military in the government. On August 6 junta members sent a letter to Francia asking him to return. This letter was not signed by Bogarin who soon fell out with the rest of the junta. After request from Yegros he was removed from junta on September 2, 1811. It is suspected that Francia used this crisis to remove influence of clergy from the junta. After this, Bogarin left politics forever. The rest of his life and death are lost to history.
