= Battle of San Nicolás =

1811 naval engagement in the Argentine War of Independence

- Part of Argentine War of Independence
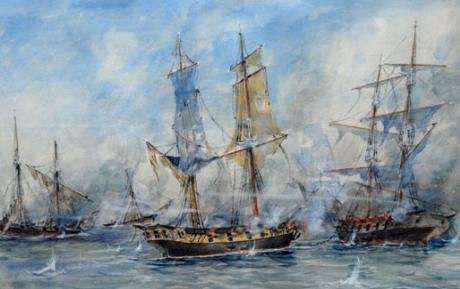
Date	2 March 1811
Location	Paraná River 33°21′37″S 60°08′16″W
Result	Viceroyalty victory

Belligerents
Viceroyalty of the Río de la Plata (Note: The Viceroyalty of the Río de la Plata continued to exist after the May Revolution, but limited to Montevideo and loyal to the Council of Regency of Spain and the Indies.)	Provinces of the Río de la Plata (Note: The Provinces of the Río de la Plata were governed by the Junta of Buenos Aires and claimed authority over all the territories of the Viceroyalty, including Montevideo.)

Commanders and leaders
(Spain) Jacinto Romarate	(Spain) Juan B. Azopardo

Strength
7 ships	3 ships

Casualties and losses
Unknown	3 ships captured

The Battle of San Nicolás was a naval engagement on 2 March 1811 on the Paraná River between the Spanish royalists from Montevideo, and the first flotilla created by the revolutionary government of Buenos Aires. It was the first engagement between the two fleets in the Río de la Plata region since the revolution, and a royalist victory.

== Background ==
On 25 May 1810 the River Plate colonies revolted against the Spanish Viceroy at the May Revolution in Buenos Aires, claiming the necessity of assuming local government due to the difficult situation in Spain, which was occupied by Napoleonic troops. The royalist authorities in Montevideo opposed the measure and declared a naval blockade of Buenos Aires. In the city of Montevideo, there was a navy base serving as port for the royal Spanish fleet in the South American Atlantic coast. The local Junta Grande (Buenos Aires' revolutionary government) decided to establish a fleet to contest the Spanish dominion of the local waters.

== Creation of the rebel fleet ==
The Junta Grande which took control of the government in Buenos Aires named Francisco de Gurruchaga, as secretary of the Navy. He immediately set to work to create a small naval fleet. With effort, Gurruchaga bought five vessels of different types from local owners, and equipped three of them with artillery, which had been taken for the most part out of service as obsolete. He obtained a schooner, a brigantine and a sloop, christened respectively "Invencible", "25 de Mayo" and "América".

Recruiting of the crew was another difficult endeavor, as the inhabitants of the pampas were not used to a sailor's life. The solution was to hire foreigners, who for the most part did not speak Spanish. The rank and file was filled with locals.

Command of the flotilla was given to a Maltese privateer, Lieutenant Colonel Juan Bautista Azopardo. This sailor had arrived in the River Plate at the beginning of the 19th century, and had participated in the British invasions of the Río de la Plata of 1806 and 1807. Azopardo commanded the "Invencible", seconded by Hipólito Bouchard on "25 de Mayo", and Ángel Hubac, on "América".

== The first mission ==
At the beginning of 1811 the Junta Grande was immersed in armed conflicts in various fronts against counter-revolutionary (royalist) forces. A small army under the command of Manuel Belgrano had been sent to Paraguay to help the locals join the revolution, but after an initial victory at the Battle of Campichuelo, he was defeated at the Battle of Paraguarí and was forced to retreat. The Junta decided to respond to the reinforcement request from Belgrano, and tasked Azopardo with the transport by river of the reinforcement troops and artillery to Paraguay. The Maltese raised his flag in the "Invencible", while the Frenchman naturalized Argentine Hipólito Bouchard was put in charge of the brigantine "25 de Mayo". Lastly, the sloop "América" was put under the command of the Frenchman Abel Hubac.

The royalist authorities in Montevideo learned of these plans and detached a flotilla to intercept the rebels. The mission was given to Jacinto Romarate, an able officer, who could deploy seven small warships of superior quality, and firepower than his enemy's.

== The Battle of San Nicolás ==
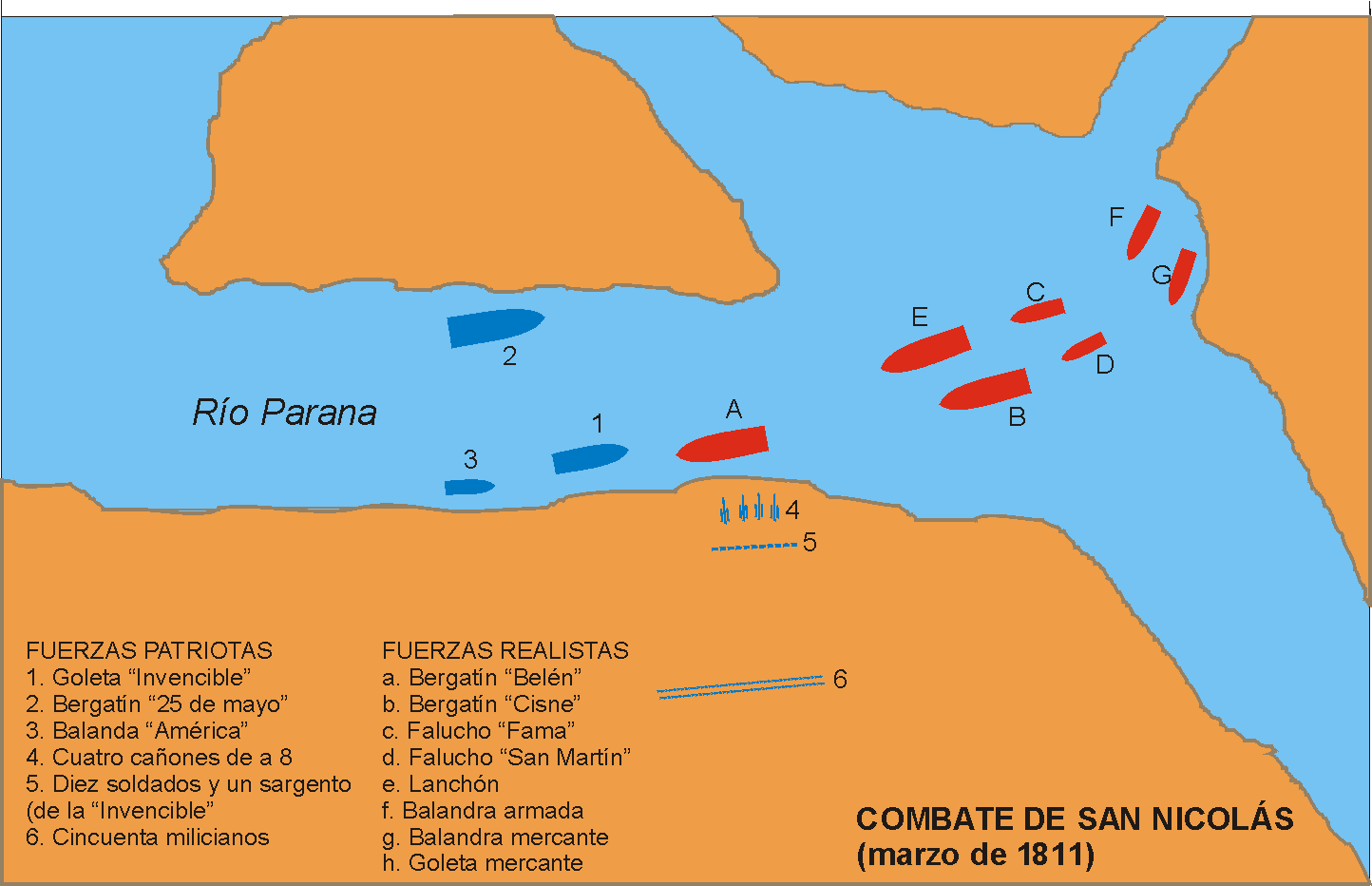
Drawing of the battle of San Nicolás, after a sketch by Azopardo.

Azopardo's flotilla left Buenos Aires, going upriver on the Paraná. Arriving near San Nicolás they saw the royalists and Azopardo decided to do battle. The rebel commander order a battery of cannons were removed from the ships and installed on the coast, and that a regiment of sailors and militias made ready to fight from the river coast.

On 2 March they fought, when the royalist ships closed in the rebels. In the first encounter, two royalist brigantines ("Belén" and "Cisne") became groundned near the coast and were made targets for the coastal cannons and the rebel infantry. Nonetheless, Azopardo could not get to board them and the ships finally freed themselves and retreated.

After several hours the royalists tried a new attack, and shot at the "Invencible". The "América" was hit several times, with a gash opening on her prow, beginning to take on water, and had to be abandoned by the crew. The royalists then concentrated on the "25 de Mayo", which they tried to board; the poorly trained crew became panicked and abandoned ship jumping overboard, against the attempts of Bouchard to stop them.

The royalist vessels closed in on the "Invencible", which was by now fighting on her own, and boarded her. The crew fought valiantly for almost two hours until the situation became unsustainable. Azopardo tried to blow up the munitions depot, but the wounded begged him not to do it, so he was forced to surrender.

== Consequences ==
The defeat caused the destruction of the rebel fleet and the taking control over the Rio de la Plata, Paraná and Uruguay rivers by the royalist fleet from Montevideo; which would last until 1813 with the creation of a new naval squadron and the victories of William Brown. In the short term, the reinforcements requested by general Belgrano did not arrive; few days after the battle at San Nicolás, Belgrano's army was attacked and defeated at the Battle of Tacuarí (9 March 1811).

Juan Bautista Azopardo became a prisoner of the royalists and was taken to Ceuta, Spain. The revolutionary government in Buenos Aires, still started a judicial process in absentia to determine his involvement in the defeat. The report obtained recognized Azopardo's courage, but concluded he had demonstrated lack of experience in command and that he had allowed lack of discipline on his crew. The sentence given was the indefinite removal of command in the armed forces, establishing that he could only serve as a subordinate officer.

Azopardo confronted while imprisoned in Spain charges of adhering to the revolutionary cause; and was condemned to death to later have his sentenced commuted. Finally in 1820, the liberal movement in Spain headed by general Rafael de Riego freed all political prisoners including Azopardo allowing him to return to South America. The following year, Buenos Aires rescinded his order and allowed him to return to military life in the Argentine Navy.

The governing Junta communicated to the people the news of the defeat in a public proclamation on 4 March 1811:

== See also ==
- Argentine Navy
- Juan Bautista Azopardo
- Action of 14 May 1814
- Battle of Martín García (1814)

== Bibliography ==
- Pérez Amuchastegui, A.J. (1972). Crónica Argentina (in Spanish). Buenos Aires: Codex S.A.
- "Escenario de batallas" (in Spanish). Government of San Nicolás. Archived from the original on 6 July 2011.
