= Michelena (disambiguation) =

Michelena is the name of some places in Venezuela and a surname of Basque origin. It may refer to:

== Places ==
- Arturo Michelena International Airport, an airport serving the city of Valencia, Venezuela
- Michelena, a town in Táchira state, Venezuela
- Santos Michelena Municipality in Aragua state, Venezuela

== People ==
- Arturo Michelena (1863–1898), Venezuelan painter
- Bernabé Michelena (1888–1963), Uruguayan sculptor and politician
- José Mariano Michelena (1772–1852), Mexican soldier and politician
- Juan Ángel Michelena (1774–1831), Spanish naval officer
- Luis Michelena (Koldo Mitxelena) (1915-1987), Basque linguist
- Manuel Michelena Iguarán (1940–2025), Spanish industrial engineer and politician
- Margarita Michelena (1917–1998), Mexican poet, literary critic, translator and journalist
- Santos Michelena (1797–1848), Venezuelan politician
