= Pedro Juan Caballero =

Paraguayan revolutionary leader (1786–1821)

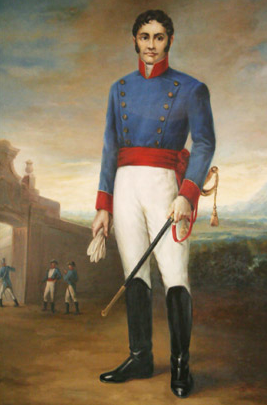
- Born: Pedro Juan Caballero de Añazco y García de Otazú; 1786; Tobatí, Paraguay
- Died: 13 July 1821 (aged 34–35)

Pedro Juan Caballero de Añazco y García de Otazú (Spanish pronunciation: [ˈpeðɾo ˈxwaŋ kaβaˈʎeɾo]; 1786 – 13 July 1821) was a leading figure of Paraguayan independence. He was born in Tobatí, a town located Cordillera Department of Paraguay, which was then part of the Spanish Viceroyalty of the Río de la Plata. He was one of the major leaders of the Revolution of May 14, 1811, despite being six years younger than the leading figure of the Independence period, Fulgencio Yegros, and 20 years younger than the future dictator of Paraguay, José Gaspar Rodríguez de Francia. In 1820, he was accused of being involved in the conspiracy against Francia, and committed suicide in his cell on July 13, 1821. The Paraguayan city of Pedro Juan Caballero is named after him.

== War of 1811 ==
Caballero participated in the Battle of Tacuarí and Battle of Paraguari against the army led by Manuel Belgrano. The Paraguayan victory at the Battle of Paraguari of January 19, 1811, forced Belgrano to retreat southward. On March 9, 1811, on the banks of River Tacuarí, while Belgrano awaited reinforcements from Buenos Aires, another battle was launched and won by Paraguayans. Belgrano called for capitulation, which was granted, and his troops left the province of Paraguay.

== May 14 Revolution ==
Military victories against the troops sent by the United Provinces of the Rio de la Plata increased Paraguayan determination to create and safeguard their own state. Worried by the rumors that the last Spanish governor Bernardo de Velasco was about to ask for military protection from Portuguese Brazil, local patriots started plotting against him. Initially they were planning to take action on May 25, a one-year anniversary of the May Revolution, but on Francia's advice decided to act sooner, without waiting for the arrival of troops led by Fulgencio Yegros.

In the evening of May 14, 1811, after the curfew had started, plotters led by Captain Pedro Juan Caballero went to the governor's quarters located on the main square of Asunción, where they were greeted by second lieutenant Mauricio José Troche, a supporter of the plot, was on duty and in charge of the small garrison of 34 men from Curuguaty.

The governor's quarters became the center of the revolution; political prisoners were released, weapons prepared, security measures taken and emissaries sent to bring Fulgencio Yegros and Manuel Atanasio Cabañas to Asunción. The cathedral bells were rung and resonated throughout the city.

At midnight Vicente Ignacio Iturbe presented Governor Velasco with demands from plotters led by Caballero, which could be summarized as follows:

- "Surrender of the main square, all the weapons and keys to the Cabildo."
- "Governor Velasco stays in power, but as a part of three-man junta which should include two representatives appointed by the officers at the quarters."

As Governor Bernardo de Velasco was reluctant to accept the conditions presented by the plotters, additional revolutionary troops came to the square and settled eight cannons in front of the government palace; Vicente Ignacio Iturbe brought a new ultimatum, setting a short deadline for response. Governor Velasco was against any bloodshed, and came to the door to say: "If this is because of authority, I give up the command baton." This announcement was met with joy by the crowd. The flag was raised and 21 cannonballs fired.

On May 17, a public proclamation informed people that a ruling junta, consisting of Governor Velasco, Gaspar Rodríguez de Francia and Army captain Juan Valeriano de Zeballos has been created.

== Junta Superior Gubernativa ==
The new junta quickly convened a National Congress on June 17, 1811, which removed Velasco from all power and created a new five-man Junta Superior Gubernativa to which Caballero was appointed. Other members were Fulgencio Yegros as President, José Gaspar Rodríguez de Francia, Francisco Xavier Bogarin, and Fernando de la Mora.

The junta's achievements included:

- In January 1812, the Paraguayan Military Academy was founded.
- The Mathematics professorship and the Patriotic Literary Society, an organization that he conducted since then, were introduced to public education.
- The Seminary was reopened and books were bought from Buenos Aires to start a Public Library.
- The old Real Colegio Seminario de San Carlos took charge of teacher salaries, meaning the beginning of free and mandatory education.
- Elementary schools were organized, the Board issued instructions for teachers, prohibiting corporal punishment.
- In the economic field, agriculture, commerce, navigation and the settlement of Gran Chaco were promoted.
- From the juridical point of view all appeals were now heard before the junta and not before the Court of Buenos Aires anymore, requesting this institution to forward all civil and criminal cases of Paraguay to the junta. The Triumvirate of Buenos Aires agreed to that demand.
- On October 12, 1811, a treaty was signed between Buenos Aires and Asunción which recognized the independence of province of Paraguay and committed both provinces to mutual assistance in case of war.

The Congress of October 1813 disbanded the five-man junta and created a two-man consulate. Caballero was a strong candidate for consulship, but in the end the more politically powerful Fulgencio Yegros and Francia were elected to be consuls.

Caballero, who was involved in the profitable yerba mate trade, was opposed to Francia's economic policies and together with Juan Manuel Gamarra and José Teodoro Fernández created opposition group which unsuccessfully tried to get support of the Consul Fulgencio Yegros. He refused and, together with Consul Francia on September 26, 1814, ordered Caballero's group to leave Asunción and retire to their country estates. Just eight days later National Congress convened and elected Francia to be the supreme dictator for a period of five years. During the next years Caballero did not participate in politics and turned his attention to the yerba mate trade.

== The plot of 1820 ==
Since 1814 José Gaspar Rodríguez de Francia ruled alone as the supreme dictator and in 1816 was elected by Congress to be dictator for life. A conspiracy, which involved many leading men of the Independence era, to overthrow Francia, was planned for the last days of Holy Week 1820. Francia learned about the plot from two slaves who denounced their master for making gunpowder and from a confession of a conspirator to his priest on Holy Week and arrests started. All the Independence heroes were arrested, even those who had voluntarily renounced any political activity, such as Fulgencio Yegros. Dr. Francia was relentless.

Some of the prisoners (64 in ten days) were shot, and a period of persecution and repression began.

Historically, this is the start of "the Franciato", the period of Francia's absolute dictatorship. Pedro Juan Caballero was arrested six months after the discovery of the plot, and committed suicide in his cell on July 13, 1821, after learning that he was to be executed. He allegedly wrote a note on the wall of his cell: "I know that suicide is against the law of God and man, but the thirst of blood of the Tyrant of my homeland shall not be appeased with mine".

== See also ==
- History of Paraguay
