= Battle of Tacuarí =

1811 battle during the Paraguay Campaign of the Argentine War of Independence

- Part of Paraguay campaign
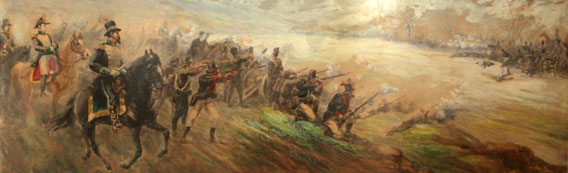
| Date | March 9, 1811 |
| Location | By the Tacuarí river, in Southern Paraguay, north of the town of Encarnación. |
| Result | Paraguayan victory |

Belligerents
| (Spain) Provinces of the Río de la Plata (Note: The Provinces of the Río de la Plata were loyal to the Junta of Buenos Aires.) | (Spain) Intendency of Paraguay (Note: The Intendency of Paraguay was loyal to the Council of Regency of Spain and the Indies.) |

Commanders and leaders
| (Spain) Manuel Belgrano | (Spain) Manuel Cabañas |

Strength
| 550 infantry and 400 cavalry | 2,500–2,700 local soldiers from Paraguay |

The Battle of Tacuarí (9 March 1811) was a battle in Southern Paraguay between forces sent by the Junta of Buenos Aires under the command of General Manuel Belgrano, and Paraguayan troops under Colonel Manuel Atanasio Cabañas, at the service of the Council of Regency.

== Background ==
After the May Revolution in Buenos Aires, capital of the Viceroyalty of the Río de la Plata, the Junta of Buenos Aires requested the other provinces to send deputies. The Spanish governor of Paraguay, Bernardo de Velasco, had refused to recognize the Junta and had received political support from the Cabildo of Asunción, so the Junta launched a military campaign to obtain the recognition.

General Manuel Belgrano, a member of the Junta, was named commander of the expedition with only 700 men, half of them without military experience. Valesco got them to fight first at Paraguarí, near Asunción, where Belgrano was defeated with relative ease.

Forced to retreat, Belgrano marched to the Tebicuary river, where he was joined by 400 men from the Guaraní militias from Yapeyú and some men from the Fatherland Cavalry Regiment (ex-Blandengues). As noted in his Memoirs, the Paraguayans did not pursue, and he could continue retreating to the town of Santa Rosa. There he received news that the situation was worsening at the Banda Oriental, so the Junta was ordering him to end the Paraguay campaign soon so he could help in the new theater of operations.

On his part Belgrano requested reinforcements and decided to stop the retreat at the Tacuarí river and establish a defensive position. He was confident that with reinforcements from Buenos Aires he could maintain the position.

The help sent by the Junta consisted of a small naval squadron travelling north on the Paraná River. This flotilla, composed of three small ships under the command of Juan Bautista Azopardo was defeated on March 2, 1811, at San Nicolás de los Arroyos, so Belgrano was left without reinforcements.

The Paraguayans advanced after Belgrano, expecting he would retread without combat after the defeat at Paraguarí. The vanguard was under the command of Fulgencio Yegros and the main army under General Manuel Cabañas, with a total of 3,000 men, plus a reinforcement of three pieces of artillery.

== The battle ==
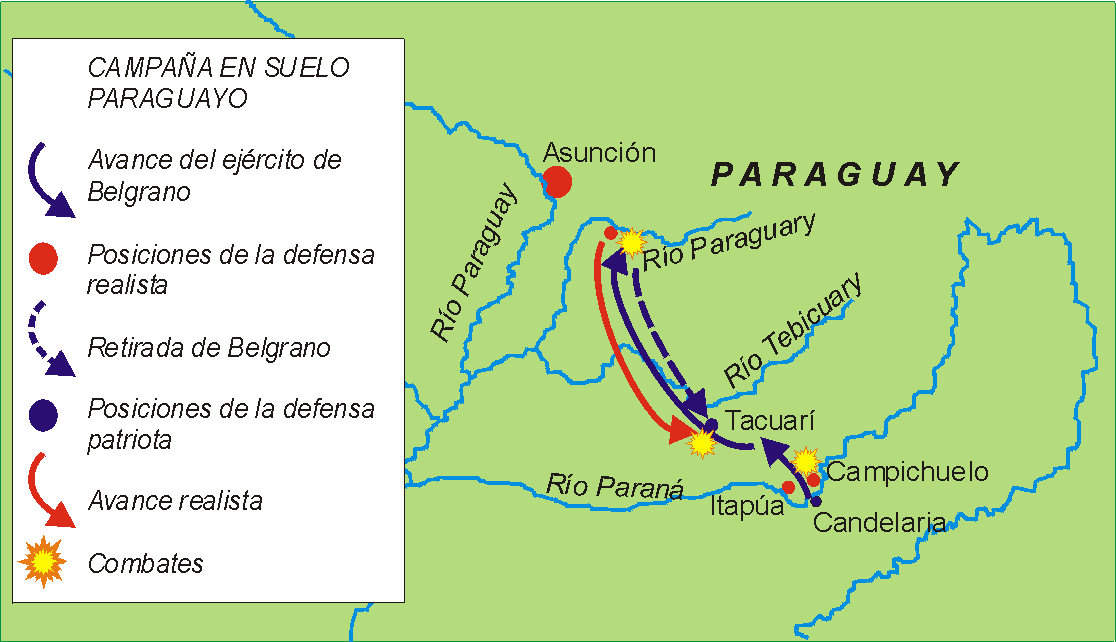
Military operations in Paraguay (December 1810 − March 1811

Velasco had communicated to Cabañas by letter on January 29:

...repel them to the other side of the Paraná river or further to obtain a communication between Montevideo and Portugal...

The Paraguayan forces under Cabañas consisted of a total of 1,400 men and 10 artillery pieces. Cabañas directly commanded 1.000 men with a division under commander Blas José de Rojas, 200 men from Villarrica with 7 pieces of artillery, an advance force under commander Fulgencio Yegros with two squadrons of cavalry (urban militias from Villarrica, Villa Real de Concepción and Caazapá) and five companies of infantry under captain Pedro Juan Caballero, captain Antonio Tomás Yegros, commander García, commander José Mariano Recalde and sub-lieutenant Pedro Pablo Miers. These forces were complemented by 400 men under commander Juan Manuel Gamarra with three pieces of artillery under the command of Pascual Urdapilleta.

On the morning of March 7 the Paraguayan troops joined in one place with the arrival of Gamarra's forces to the right side of the Tacuary river. Cabañas wrote that day to Velasco:

... I'll be ready from tomorrow to commence hostilities on the enemy with no respite until Saturday when I plan to subject him to three attacks ... [the plan] is to go by the bridge ... with four pieces of artillery and a thousand men and attack suddenly if possible in that area and in front ... [supported] from a raft and two boats I have posted at the mouth of the Tacuary.

On March 8 a bridge over the river was finished and the Paraguayan troops commenced to cross. On March 9, the Paraguayans attacked the front of Belgrano's position. He was reinforced behind the Tacuarí river, forcing Cabañas's forces to cross the river under enemy fire, but Cabañas left only part of his forces to cross directly, including all the artillery, and advanced with the rest through a man-made path through the jungle.

Through a path opened specifically for this operation, Cabañas attacked the enemy at their flank. Colonel José Machain moved to the side to repel them, but was surrounded by Paraguayan cavalry and forced to surrender. Therefore, Belgrano left only a few men in a defensive position and marched to help Machain. Commanding the defenders at the river crossing was major Celestino Vidal, who was left almost blind by cannon fire.

Belgrano refused to surrender under Cabañas request, and maintained a steady resistance, which forced the Paraguayans to stop their advance. Rapidly, Belgrano retreated with the remainder of his army to a nearby hill. From there he sent a communication to Cabañas, saying

"the forces of Buenos Aires had come to help not conquer Paraguay. Seeing they reject their liberators by force, I have decided to evacuate the province, crossing the Paraná river with the army under my command..."

Cabañas took that communique as a request for armistice, and ordered Belgrano to abandon the province completely in one day.

== Consequences ==
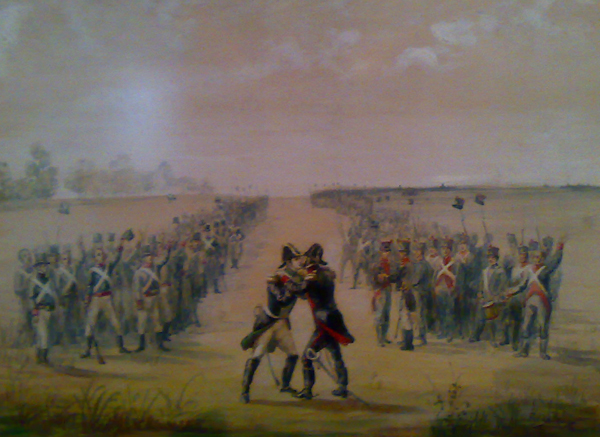
Manuel Belgrano and Manuel Cabañas embraced after the battle.

Even though his army suffered a serious defeat, there are some accomplishments by Belgrano from his defense at Tacuarí.

In first place, he succeeded in extracting an important part of the army from Paraguay, about 400 men, including the prisoners captured with Machain. These men would form the future United Provinces army that would fight at the Banda Oriental (present-day Uruguay), supporting the local militia commanded by José Artigas.

Belgrano wrote a proposal that general Cabañas took to Asunción to form the base for a peace treaty between Asunción and Buenos Aires; this included free commerce between the two capitals and the formation of a new local government in Asunción. He also requested this new government to send a representative that would form part of the Government (Junta) in Buenos Aires and would negotiate all the reparations that would be paid by Buenos Aires for the war they took to Paraguay. Belgrano made the condition that this would require at the formation of a local autonomous government (outside of Spain and the Royalists) and that it recognized the rebel government in Buenos Aires.

His best success, in any case, was to have Paraguay start to seriously consider independence from Spain, even without joining the United Provinces. In effect, shortly after May 14, the Paraguayans declared their independence from Spain (on May 17) and formed their first government after a peaceful rebellion at Asuncion that forced the resignation of the entire city and provincial councils, after a plan to have Portuguese troops from Brazil as reinforcements to the Spanish troops as counterweight to the Argentine troops was exposed. Among their first proponents were several of the victors at Tacuarí, especially Fulgencio Yegros.

Belgrano's campaign did not accomplish their goal of having Paraguay to form part of the United Provinces of the Río de la Plata, joined by the other ex-provinces of the Viceroyalty of the Río de la Plata.

Due to his military defeat in Paraguay the Primera Junta in Buenos Aires opened a Court Martial for Belgrano on June 6, 1811, even though they did not have a definite charge against him, instead a people's petition (petición del pueblo) to make the charges that would be appropriate. Nobody presented any charges against him, and the officers under his command in the Paraguay campaign did not have any complaints and defended his patriotism and irreproachable conduct.

Finally, the government decided on August 9, 1811, to absolve him of all charges and published the verdict in the Buenos Ayres Gazette

...it is declared that General Manuel Belgrano, of the Army of the North, has conducted himself in command of the army with courage and deserves the recognition of the motherland...

== The Drummer boy of Tacuarí ==
The Drummer of Tacuarí.

There is an Argentine myth about a child called the "Drummer of Tacuarí" who would have been involved in the battle. It is said that it was a 12 years old child, acting as military drummer in the first lines of battle, being guide of the above-mentioned commander Celestino Vidal and was playing a snare drum. It is also said that his name was Pedrito Ríos, that he was born in Concepción del Uruguay and that he died in the battle.

However, this child is not mentioned in battle reports of the time, either the immediate ones or others made days or months later. The first mention to the drummer of Tacuarí was formulated 45 years after the battle, and depicted shortly after in a portrait with a 50-year-old blind man (however, Vidal was nearly 21 years old when the battle took place). This portrait would be based on many improbable ideas: that the army was led by a blind man (in real life Vidal was almost blind due to cannon fire), that a 12 years old child would be allowed in the front lines, and that a child might be able to serve both as guide of a blind man and a military drummer in the middle of a battle between Argentines and Spanish royalists. This myth has made way into Argentine military history, a legend told through the years.

In light of this, today, the "Tacuari Drummer" Regimental Band of the 1st Regiment of Foot Infantry "Patricios" has a young snare drummer in its ranks, bringing this story to the 21st-century Argentina. This is the only Argentine Military band to have a child play as a military musician, in tribute to the young drummer from Concepcion del Uruguay who used his talent, at the cost of his life, to bring victory to the Argentine forces and would result, indirectly, in Paraguay's independence days after, with several of the victorious royalist officers and soldiers supporting it.

== See also ==
- History of Paraguay
