= Battle of the Retiro =

Battle of the 2nd British Invasion of the Río de la Plata

- Part of Anglo-Spanish War (1796–1808)
Date	July 5, 1807
Location	Retiro, Buenos Aires
Result	British victory

Belligerents
Spain	United Kingdom

Commanders and leaders
Santiago de Liniers; Juan Antonio Gutiérrez de la Concha; Juan Ángel Michelena; José de Córdoba y Rojas; Jacobo Adrián Varela	John Whitelocke; Samuel Auchmuty; George Murray; Robert Craufurd; William Lumley; Denis Pack

Units involved
Armada Española; Tercio de Gallegos; Regimiento de Patricios	3rd Regiment of Foot; 36th Regiment of Foot; 38th Regiment of Foot; 87th Regiment of Foot.

Strength
600	2,500

Casualties and losses
567	62 dead

Battle of the Retiro (Spanish: Combate del Retiro) was a battle produced during the second British Invasion of the Río de la Plata, between the Spanish troops, led by Santiago de Liniers, and the British forces under John Whitelocke.

== History ==
The combats took place on July 5, 1807, in the Plaza de Toros del Retiro, current Plaza San Martín (Buenos Aires). The Spanish forces had fighters belonging to the Spanish Navy, commanded by the Captain Juan Gutiérrez de la Concha, and the Lt. Juan Ángel Michelena. It also counted on the participation of Creole militias, among them the Regiment of Patricians, and Grenadier Corps of the Third of Galicia, commanding Jacobo Adrián Varela. The British troops were in command of the Generals Samuel Auchmuty and William Lumley, who advanced towards the Plaza de Toros on July 4, 1807.

The Battle of the Retiro was the bloodiest battle produced during the English Invasions, with 400 prisoners, 80 dead, 144 wounded and 21 missing on the Spanish side, and 60 casualties on the British Army, who won the battle after 3 hours of fighting.
