= Independence of Paraguay =

Independence process of Paraguay (1811-1814)

Republic of Paraguay República del Paraguay
- 1811–1814
- Flag

- Capital: Asunción
- President
  - 1811-1813: Fulgencio Yegros
- Governor Intendants
  - 1811: Bernardo de Velasco
  - 1811: Rodríguez de Francia
  - 1811: Valeriano de Zevallos
- Consul
  - 1813-1814: Rodríguez de Francia
  - 1814: Fulgencio Yegros
- Historical era: Decolonization of the Americas
  - May Revolution: 25 May 1810
  - Established: 14 May 1811
  - Republic proclaimed: 12 October 1813
  - Disestablished: 3 October 1814
Preceded by	Succeeded by
Spanish Empire; Intendancy of Paraguay	Republic of Paraguay

The Independence of Paraguay de facto started on 14 May 1811 after the Revolution of May 14 when a local ruling junta was created. In early 1811 Paraguayan forces had repeatedly defeated the Argentine army which considered Paraguay to be a break-away province. On 12 October 1813 the Paraguayan Republic was proclaimed. Officially, independence was proclaimed only on 25 November 1842. Paraguayan independence was assured only after the Paraguayan War, when the Empire of Brazil resisted Argentine offers to divide and annex the country.

== Background ==
In 1776 Spanish king Charles III created the Viceroyalty of the Río de la Plata with Buenos Aires as its capital city. It included parts of modern-day Argentina, Bolivia, Uruguay and the Brazilian state of Rio Grande do Sul. In 1782 a system of Intendencies was introduced. The Intendency of Paraguay had only one town with city status – Asunción.

During the Napoleonic era and the Peninsular War, when mainland Spain was allied with and later occupied by the French, the British Empire attempted to take control of the Viceroyalty by launching the River Plate invasions, occupying Buenos Aires and neighbouring parts of the Río de la Plata in 1806 and 1807. Paraguayan units led by governor Bernardo de Velasco participated in the battles for Montevideo during the invasions.

== Royalist rule ==
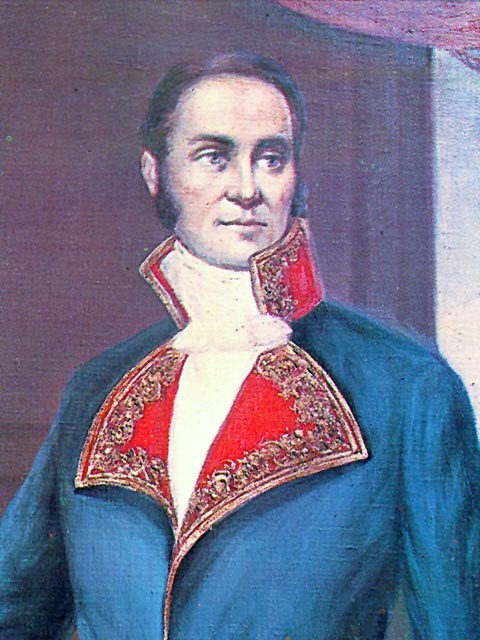
Fulgencio Yegros

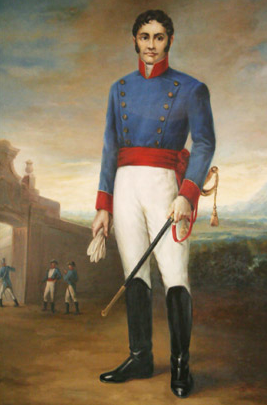
Pedro Juan Caballero

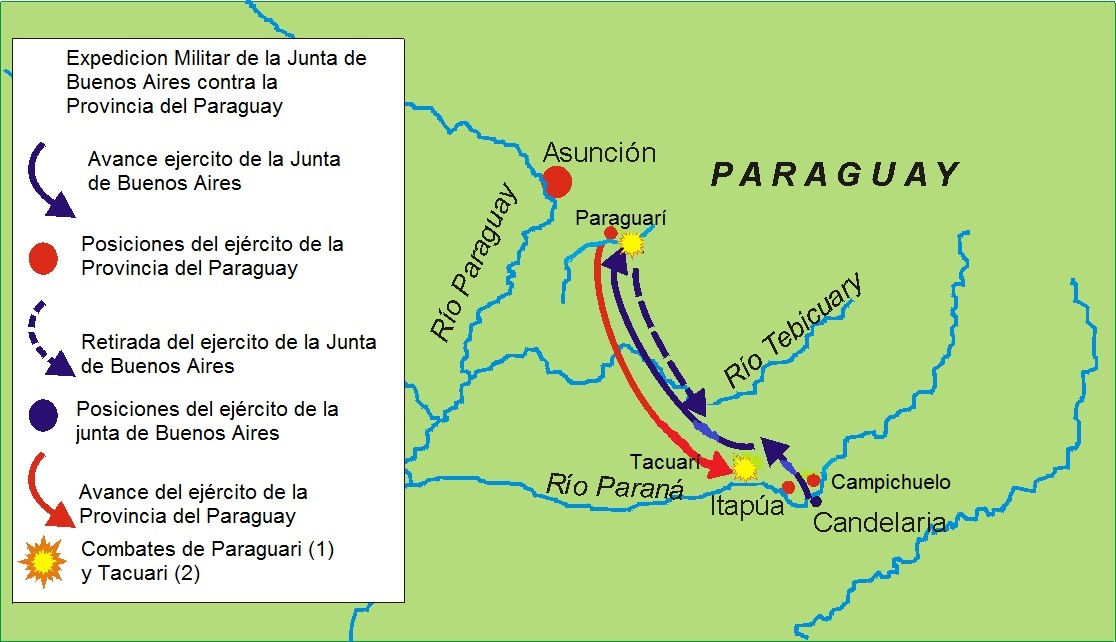
Belgrano's campaign against Paraguay

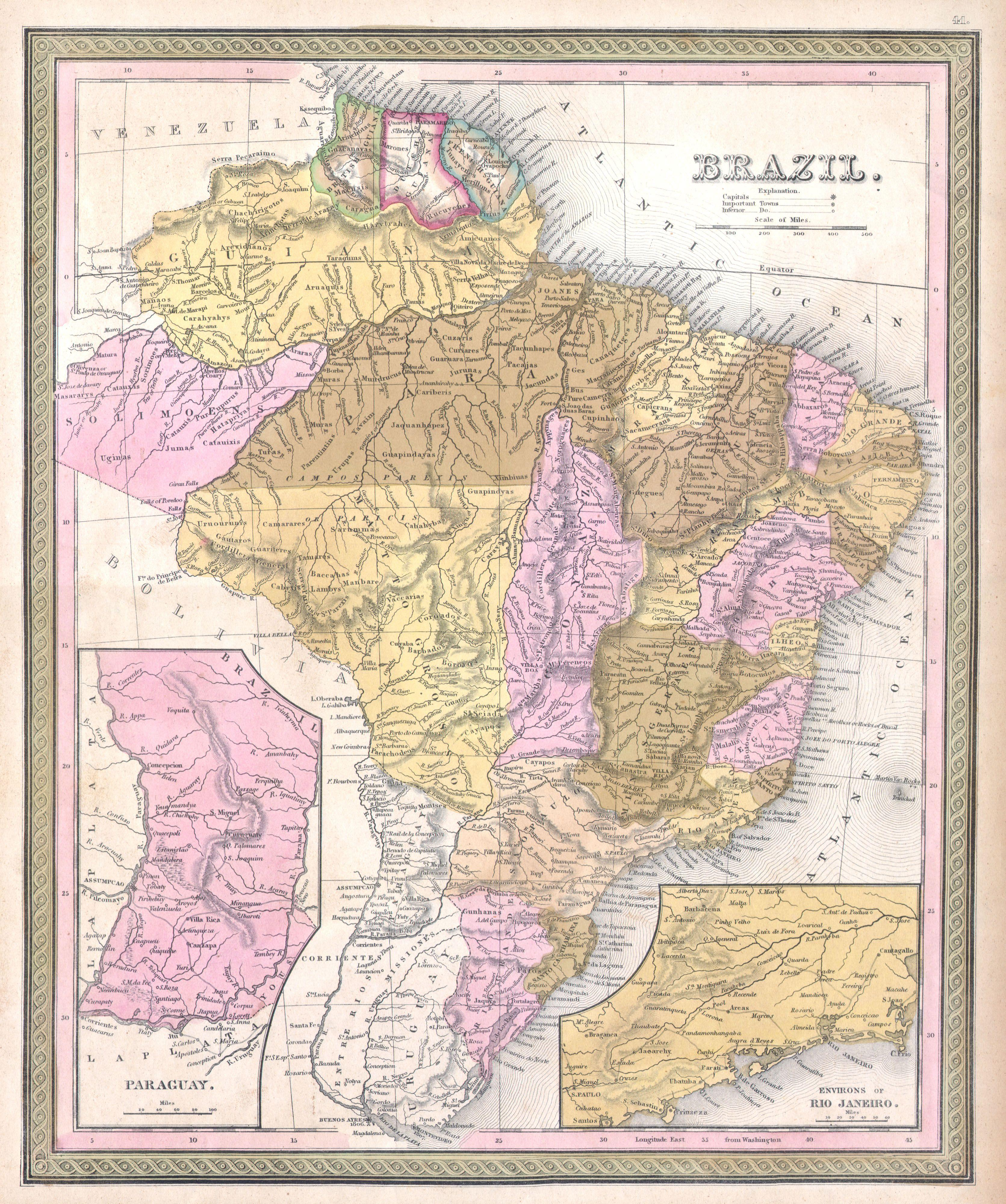
Map of Paraguay in 1850

After the 1810 May Revolution in Buenos Aires and formation of the Primera Junta which aimed to rule over the entire viceroyalty, the junta sent colonel José de Espinola to Asunción with the task to bringing the province under the junta's authority. Espinola failed in his mission and was quickly chased out of the province.

The royal governor of Asunción, Bernardo de Velasco, organized a local Cabildo of 200 local notables on July 24, which sent a reply to Buenos Aires announcing continued loyalty to the Spanish king Ferdinand VII and rejection of the authority of the Primera Junta. The local cabildo also announced mobilization and Velasco left with troops for the Yaguarón to establish defensive positions.

The political future of Paraguay was decided by conflicts between three groups, each of which had different plans for the future: gachupines (born in Spain), porteños (inhabitants of Buenos Aires) and the local Paraguayan-born criollo elite which was led by Fulgencio Yegros and Pedro Juan Caballero.

In September 1810 a porteño conspiracy to seize the power in Asunción was uncovered and the suspects were arrested and sent to Fort Borbon.

The porteños wanted to extend their rule over the entire former viceroyalty and in September 1810 Buenos Aires sent troops under general Manuel Belgrano to conquer Paraguay, but in the early months of 1811 they were defeated at the battle of Tacuarí and the battle of Paraguarí and the Paraguay campaign ended in a failure.

Governor Velasco, who had displayed cowardice by fleeing from these battles, then had plans to ask for Portuguese military protection and was ready to accept Portuguese sovereignty, which caused discontent among the victorious criollo led Paraguayan troops as the Portuguese were old enemies who had annexed many Paraguayan territories.

The double victories of the criollo army over Belgrano weakened the position of the royalists and governor Velasco and helped bolster nationalism amongst the criollo officers who started a plot to overthrow Velasco.

== Revolution of May 25 ==
Initially, the plan called for a military uprising to start on May 25, the one-year anniversary of the May Revolution. The military forces, under Fulgencio Yegros, were expected to march from Itapúa supported by garrisons in other towns, but negotiations of governor Velasco with Portuguese representatives from Brazil, hastened the uprising.

In the evening of May 14, 1810 a military insurrection broke out in Asunción garrison. Plotters led by captain Pedro Juan Caballero went to the Governor's quarters located on the main square of Asunción, where they were greeted by second lieutenant Mauricio José Troche, a supporter of the plot, who was on duty and in charge of the small garrison of 34 men from Curuguaty.

At midnight, ensign Vicente Ignacio Iturbe presented himself to governor Velasco with demands from plotters led by Caballero, which could be summarized as follows:

- "Surrender of the main square, all the weapons and keys to the Cabildo."
- "Governor Velasco stays in power, but as a part of three-man junta which should include two representatives appointed by the officers at the quarters."

A group of officers and politicians, which included captain Pedro Juan Caballero, Fulgencio Yegros, Vicente Ignacio Iturbe, Mauricio Jose Troche, Fernando de la Mora, Juan Valeriano de Zeballos and José Gaspar Rodríguez de Francia forced governor Velasco to agree on the creation of a three-man executive junta.

As governor Bernardo de Velasco was reluctant to accept the conditions presented by the plotters, additional revolutionary troops came to the square and set up a battery of eight cannons in front of the government house in Asunción; ensign Vicente Ignacio Iturbe brought a new ultimatum, setting a short deadline for response. It was already early morning on 15 May 1811. As the town garrison assembled, Governor Velasco hoping to avoid bloodshed, came to the government house's door and said: "If this is because of authority, I give up the command baton." This announcement was met with joy by the assembled crowd. The flag was raised and a 21-gun salute fired amidst the ringing of church bells (this day is marked as Paraguayan Independence Day).

On May 17 a public proclamation informed the people that a ruling junta, consisting of governor Velasco, Gaspar Rodriguez de Francia and Spanish-born Army captain Juan Valeriano de Zeballos had been created. Fulgencio Yegros reached Asunción only on 21 May 1811.

== Path towards full independence ==
The Junta, which consisted of governor Velasco, local politician Francia and Spanish-born officer Zeballos, and still swore allegiance to the Spanish crown, ruled until the First National Congress was convened on 17 June 1811. Already before the Congress Velasco was placed under a house arrest on June 9 because of his continued conspiring with the Portuguese.

The Congress approved the creation of a new five-man Junta Superior Gubernativa, led by Yegros. On 20 July 1811, the junta sent a letter to Buenos Aires expressing Paraguay's will to be independent and proposing a confederation of independent countries. On 12 October 1811, a short-lived treaty of confederation was signed with Buenos Aires.

The Second National Congress was held from September 30 until October 12, 1813. It was attended by 1,100 delegates and presided over by Pedro Juan Caballero. The Congress approved the new Constitution on 12 October 1813, when the Paraguayan Republic was officially proclaimed. It also created a two-man executive body with two consuls – Yegros and Francia. The Third National Congress was held on October 3–4, 1814 and replaced the two-man executive body with a single ruler dictatorship, to which Francia was elected.

== International recognition ==
While Paraguay managed to isolate itself from the outside world under the rule of Francia and avoided military conflicts with the Argentine Confederation and the Empire of Brazil, its independence was still not recognized internationally.

Only on 25 November 1842 the Paraguayan Congress formally declared an Act of Independence. It was recognized by Bolivia on 17 June 1843. However it was fully secure only after the Empire of Brazil recognized it on 14 September 1844 followed by Argentina on 17 July 1852. However, this recognition was rejected by the Congress of Argentina and the actual recognition of independence by Argentina came only in 1856.

The United States recognized Paraguay as a separate and independent country on 27 April 1852. The American Legation in Asunción was established on 26 November 1861, when American Commissioner Charles Ames Washburn presented his credentials.
