= Jacinto de Romarate =

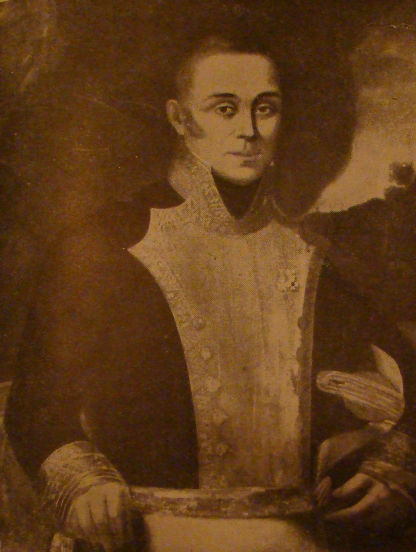
Jacinto de Romarate

Jacinto de Romarate Salamanca (1775 – 1836) was a Spanish Navy officer who fought in the British invasions of the River Plate and on the Royalist side during the Argentine War of Independence.

Back in Spain, he participated in the First Carlist War.

== Biography ==
He was born at Güeñes, in Biscay, and joined the Spanish navy. He moved to Puerto Rico first, and then to Montevideo. He participated in the recaptured of Buenos Aires during the first British invasion of the River Plate, commanding the ship La Vizcaína. He was wounded during the battle, and promoted afterwards. Romarate fought as well in the defense of Buenos Aires against the second invasion.

Romarate did not accept the legitimacy of the government Junta established in 1808 by Javier de Elío in Montevideo, and moved to Buenos Aires. He rejected as well the May Revolution, which succeeded in deposing the viceroy. When the Primera Junta took government, Romarate moved back to Montevideo. He also refused support to the mutiny of Álzaga, a Royalist plot eventually suppressed by the Buenos Aires government. Montevideo declared war on Buenos Aires, and Romarate fought in the naval blockade imposed to the city. During the battle of San Nicolás, he defeated a rudimentary flotilla, which was sending reinforcements to Manuel Belgrano in the Paraguay campaign. He was finally defeated by Guillermo Brown during the Battle of Martín García. Romarate would not surrender until the capitulation of Montevideo, and then requested to return to Spain to fight in the Peninsular War.
