= Tercio de Gallegos =

- Batallón de Voluntarios Urbanos de Galicia
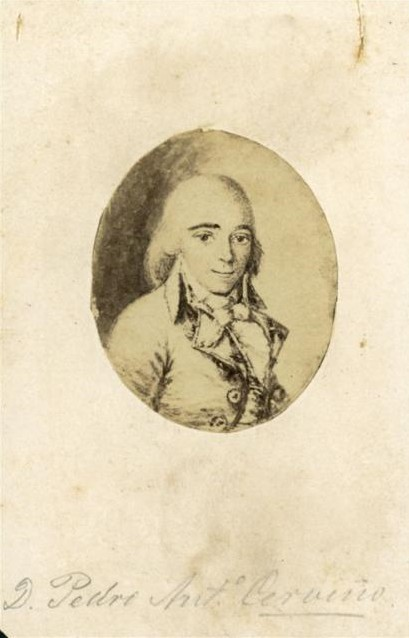
- His commander, Pedro Antonio Cerviño
- Active: 1806
- Disbanded: 1809
- Country: Argentina
- Allegiance: Spain
- Branch: Spanish Army
- Type: Infantry
- Garrison/HQ: Fuerte de Buenos Aires
- Engagements: Battle of Santo Domingo; Battle of the Retiro; Mutiny of Álzaga

Commanders
- Notable commanders: Pedro Antonio Cerviño; José Fernández de Castro; Jacobo Adrián Varela; Agustín González Miguens; Juan Sánchez Boado; Ramón López; Juan Antonio Blades; Ramón Ximénez; Bernardo Pampillo; Lorenzo Santabaya

Tercio de Gallegos was a unit of Spanish Creole militias of Buenos Aires, created during the British invasions of the River Plate. It was composed mainly of militiamen from Galicia, its commander was Pedro Cerviño, born in Campo Lameiro, Pontevedra.

The Tercio of Gallegos was dissolved in 1809, after the support of its members to Martín de Álzaga against the viceroy Santiago de Liniers. Towards 1807, this military unit had eight rifle companies, and one of Grenadiers in command of Jacobo Adrián Varela, who had an outstanding performance during the Combate del Retiro, occurred on July 5 of that year.
