= Fernando de la Mora (politician) =

- Fernando de la Mora
- Born: Fernando de la Mora; December 18, 1773; Limpio, Paraguay
- Died: May 14, 1835 (aged 61); Asunción, Paraguay
- Occupation(s): Attorney, Military, Politician

Fernando de la Mora was one of the founding fathers of Paraguay, and was an early leader of the country between 1811 and 1813, but soon lost his power and died imprisoned. The Paraguayan city Fernando de la Mora is named in his honor.

== Childhood and youth ==
He was born in Limpio (formerly known as Tapúa) in 1773, in the family of Cavalry Captain Fernando de la Mora and Ana del Cazal who both belonged to families whose lineage descended from the Spanish conquistador Don Domingo Martínez de Irala.

Fernando received a good education. It is presumed that he studied at the College of San Carlos in Asunción. He also studied in Buenos Aires and National University of Córdoba. He studied law, becoming one of the most educated citizens of the time.

== Family ==
De la Mora had five brothers and a sister Rosa Isabel de la Mora Cazal. She married Mariano Antonio Martínez Viana, who was Congressman in 1811. From their marriage Francisca Carlota Viana de la Mora was born. Among his descendants was Juana Paula Carrillo Viana, wife of Don Carlos Antonio López and mother of Francisco Solano López.

Fernando de la Mora was married to Josefa Antonia Cohene, and had five children.

== Public life ==
He entered export trade business that allowed Mora to establish good relationships with his peers. After his father died in 1801 Fernando took over the management of the family property.

In 1802 he was appointed deputy of Asunción by the Consulate of Buenos Aires, representing the union of merchants and held this position until 1804. His work at the port was useful in consolidating good relationships with the leading families of the city. Well educated and well liked, he was part of the small rural elite of Asunción and had social and commercial ties to major patrician families of Buenos Aires.

He participated in the defense of the Viceroyalty of the Río de la Plata against British invasions of the River Plate between 1806 and 1807 and helped to expel British from Montevideo, which they had occupied in 1807.

In 1810 he started to work at the City Hall of Asunción.

== Politics ==
De la Mora was a strong supporter of Paraguayan independence from Spain and participated in the Revolution of May 14, 1811.

On 17 June 1811 the First National Congress of Paraguay convened. Mariano Antonio Molas proposed that Congress removes the last Spanish governor Bernardo de Velazco y Huidobro from all posts. A new five-man ruling junta was created with Colonel Fulgencio Yegros as its President.

Other members of junta were Dr. José Gaspar Rodríguez de Francia, a skilled civilian figure, the young captain Pedro Juan Caballero representative of the troops that had defeated the invasion of Buenos Aires, a priest Francisco Xavier Bogarin and finally Don Fernando de la Mora, a civilian, who was linked to Paraguayan society.

Soon after he had assumed his duties, de la Mora was appointed to lead a punitive expedition against the native Mbayá people. In November 1812 he was sent to the Villa Real of Concepcion with orders to recover Fort Borbon which had been recently occupied by the Portuguese. Having noticed the withdrawal of the forces belonging to the strong neighboring to the fort of Coimbra, Mora established the City Hall of Concepcion, created by decree of the junta on 12 November 1812.

During the absence of Mora from the meetings of the junta for almost the entire year of 1812 Dr. Francia managed on to increase his own power. Knowing that Mora was opponent to his ideas, Francia responded by accusing Mora with intentions of joining Paraguay with Buenos Aires and with the loss of some secret state documents. He was referring to the additional article of the treaty of 12 October 1811 signed on Asunción with the Manuel Belgrano, which the First Triumvirate of Buenos Aires used to unjustifiably apply taxes to Paraguayan tobacco and start a trade war.

Francia, who had all the intentions of becoming the sole ruler of Paraguay, on 21 August 1813 succeeded in removing Mora from the ruling junta.

== Death ==
Mora was implicated in the failed 1820 plot against Francia and was imprisoned for the rest of his life. His exact cause of death is uncertain, but it is assumed that he died in prison.

== Tribute ==
On 6 October 1923 Municipality of Asunción decided to pay tribute to Mora by giving his name to the avenue that begins on the "General Santos" street and ends at "Defensores del Chaco" Avenue.
