= Juan Ángel Michelena =

Juan Ángel de Michelena
- Born: Juan Ángel de Michelena y Moreno; 1774; Maracaibo, Viceroyalty of New Granada
- Died: 29 September 1831 (aged 56–57); Ferrol, Spain
- Burial place: Pantheon of Illustrious Sailors
- Spouse: María del Carmen del Pino y Vera Muxica
- Military career
- Allegiance: Spain
- Branch: Spanish Navy
- Service years: 1788–1831
- Rank: Admiral
- Conflicts: Battle of Cape St. Vincent; British invasions of the River Plate; Battle of Buceo; Battle of Trocadero
- Awards: Legion of Honour; Royal and Military Order of Saint Hermenegild

Juan Ángel Michelena (1774 – 29 September 1831) was a Spanish Navy officer and colonial administrator who served in the French Revolutionary and Napoleonic Wars and the Argentine War of Independence. He also served as acting governor of Montevideo. He maintained his loyalty to the Spanish Empire during the Argentine War of Independence. In 1825, he was designated as governor of Ferrol, Galicia.

== Personal life ==
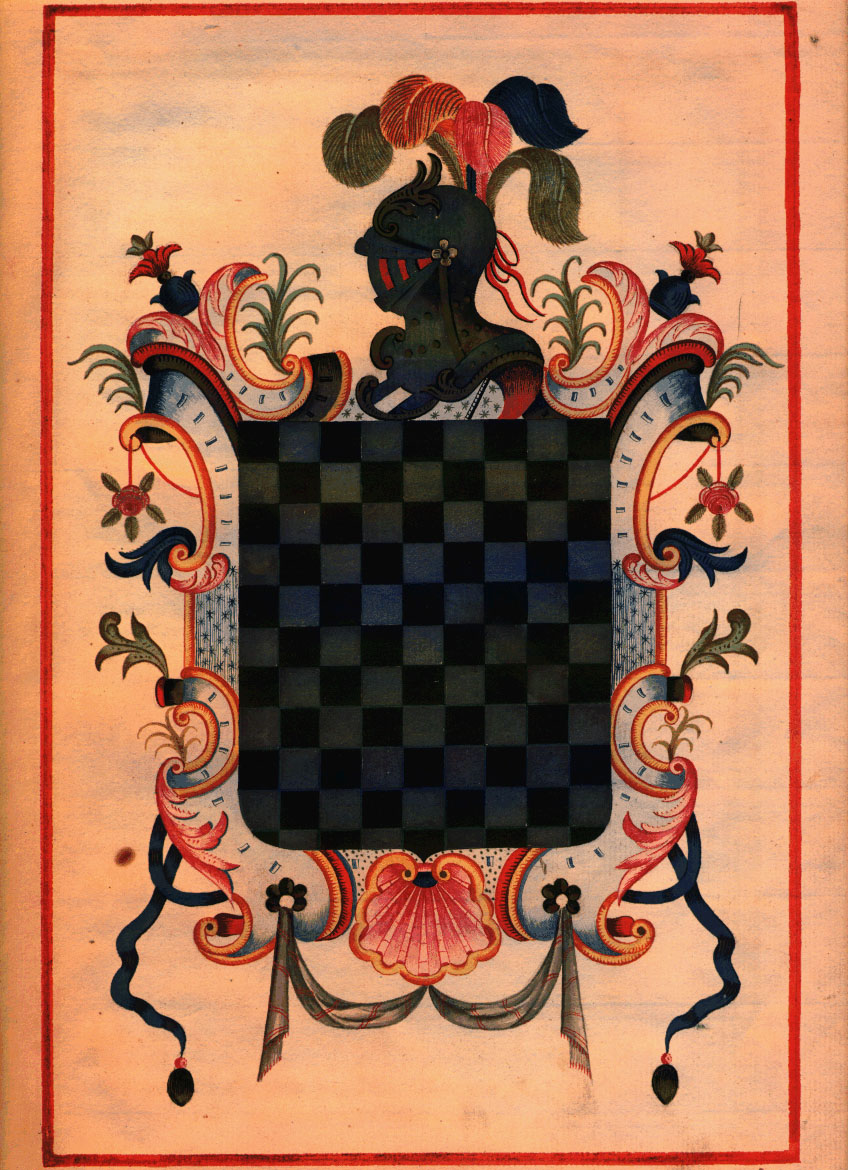
Coat of arms of Michelena's father

Michelena was born in Maracaibo (Venezuela). His father, José Ignacio de Michelena y Echeverría, was born in Cádiz, and belonged to a noble family of Basque ancestors. He had served as alcalde in the City of Caracas, and was a member of the Guipuzcoan Company. His mother, Maria Josefa Moreno de Mendoza, was born in Ceuta, the daughter of Francisco Javier Moreno de Mendoza, governor of Maracaibo, and María Teresa Rodríguez de Balbas.

Michelena was married in Buenos Aires, in the Cathedral Mayor, to María del Carmen del Pino, daughter of Joaquín del Pino and Rafaela de Vera Mujica. His wife was sister of Juana del Pino, wife of Bernardino Rivadavia. The couple bore six children between 1807 and 1821: Clara María Rafaela Ramona del Corazón de Jesús, Miguel Magín Wenceslao Joaquín Ramón, José María Alejandro Magín Ramón del Corazón de Jesús, Juan Angel Hilario Ramón Magín, Manuel Francisco Javier Arcadio Ramón Magín del Corazón de Jesús and Rafaela Genoveva Michelena del Pino.

His son, Juan Ángel Ramón Higinio Hilario Michelena del Pino, was born on January 5, 1818, in Buenos Aires, and served in the Spanish Navy. He was married in Spain to María de Rada; their son was Juan Ángel de Michelena y Rada.

== Military career ==
Michelena did his studies in Europe, traveled to Spain at an early age, and joined the Spanish Navy in the military port of Cádiz at age twelve. In 1788, he finished his elementary studies, and embarked on February 1 in the frigate Cecilia, in which he sailed towards Tangier, Cartagena, Constantinople and the coast of Syria. In 1789, he returned to Cádiz, promoted to alférez on January 13 of that same year. He served as an assistant to Juan Joaquín Moreno, captain of the ship San Lorenzo), making trips to Barcelona, Livorno and Naples with the squadron commanded by Félix Ignacio de Tejada, Captain General of the Spanish Navy.

Back in Cádiz, Michelena served two months in the Corps of Dragoons of the Spanish Navy. He later was promoted to lieutenant, and served in Havana and Puerto Rico. On February 14, 1797, he fought in the Battle of Cape St. Vincent, in which a Spanish fleet was defeated by a Royal Navy fleet under John Jervis. In 1798, he served on the ship San Pablo, commanded by Captain of the Navy Jose de Mazarredo y Salazar, in pursuit of the British squadrons blockading the port of Cádiz. He also took part in the capture of the 14-gun British sloop Pitt.

In 1803 Michelena was to the control of the brig Ligero, with which it captured a pirate ship that operated in the Mediterranean. Then went to La Coruña and crossed the Atlantic, to serve as correspondent between the Antilles, Tierra Firme and Montevideo.

He was Captain in 1805, when he came to Montevideo, serving to command of General Pascual Ruiz Huidobro. The following year he joined the campaign of Santiago de Liniers. to fight against the British invasions of the River Plate, as head of the sailors who fought on land, participating in a battle at Retiro. Later he was one of the Captains who led and brought troops to and from the Banda Oriental.

During the second British invasion of the River Plate, Michelena was commissioned to lead the schooner Remedios, with which he managed to force two British brigs to withdraw in a minor naval engagement.

In September 1807 the Viceroy Liniers, had appointed Michelena as governor in the Banda Oriental, event that causes great commotion in the Uruguayan community. Michelena finally traveled to Montevideo to take over government, after arrival was insulted and beaten in public by Francisco Javier de Elio. He remained during the following years in Montevideo, but did not support the ruling junta installed by Elio in that city in 1808. A year later, Elio was deposed by the new viceroy, Baltasar Hidalgo de Cisneros.

Michelena was in Buenos Aires when the May Revolution broke out, and had accompanied to the General Joaquin de Soria to Montevideo. In an act of stupidity that will cost you dearly, the Primera Junta did not try to prevent who Soria, carry the naval fleet with him toward Montevideo, where they formed the most powerful realist centre. Michelena had helped disarm the revolutionary attempt engineered by Colonel Prudencio Murguiondo in the Banda Oriental.

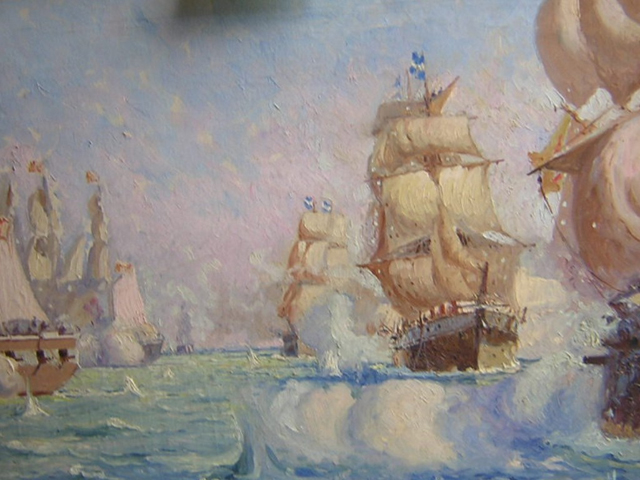
Battle of Buceo (by Justo Lynch)

In December of that same year, 1810, he led a campaign against the shores of the Uruguay River, achieving the recruitment of several towns to obedience from Montevideo, among them Concepción del Uruguay, Gualeguaychú, Paysandú, Soriano, Mercedes, and Colla. When the Uruguayans took up arms early in the next year, Michelena could not prevent the sending reinforcements by the patriots porteños, but at least greatly delayed their progress. Along with Captain Jacinto de Romarate, fought against the patriotic troops in several campaigns, and plundered the coast of the Paraná River, causing the weakening of the porteños.

In July 1811, Michelena had approached the coast of Buenos Aires commanding five Spanish ships, he had order to open fire on the city. In total thirty-one bombs, and three cannonballs, were fired at the Rio de la Plata, without reaching the coast of the city (event known as Primer Bombardeo de Buenos Aires).

In August 1812, he led a Second bombing on Buenos Aires, who only provoked some damage in coast of the river, but caused great psychological effect on the inhabitants.

In 1814, Michelena participated in the Battle of Buceo, where Royalist naval forces confronted Patriot ships led by William Brown. Michelena was one of the prisoners of the battle, when the city surrendered to General Carlos María de Alvear.

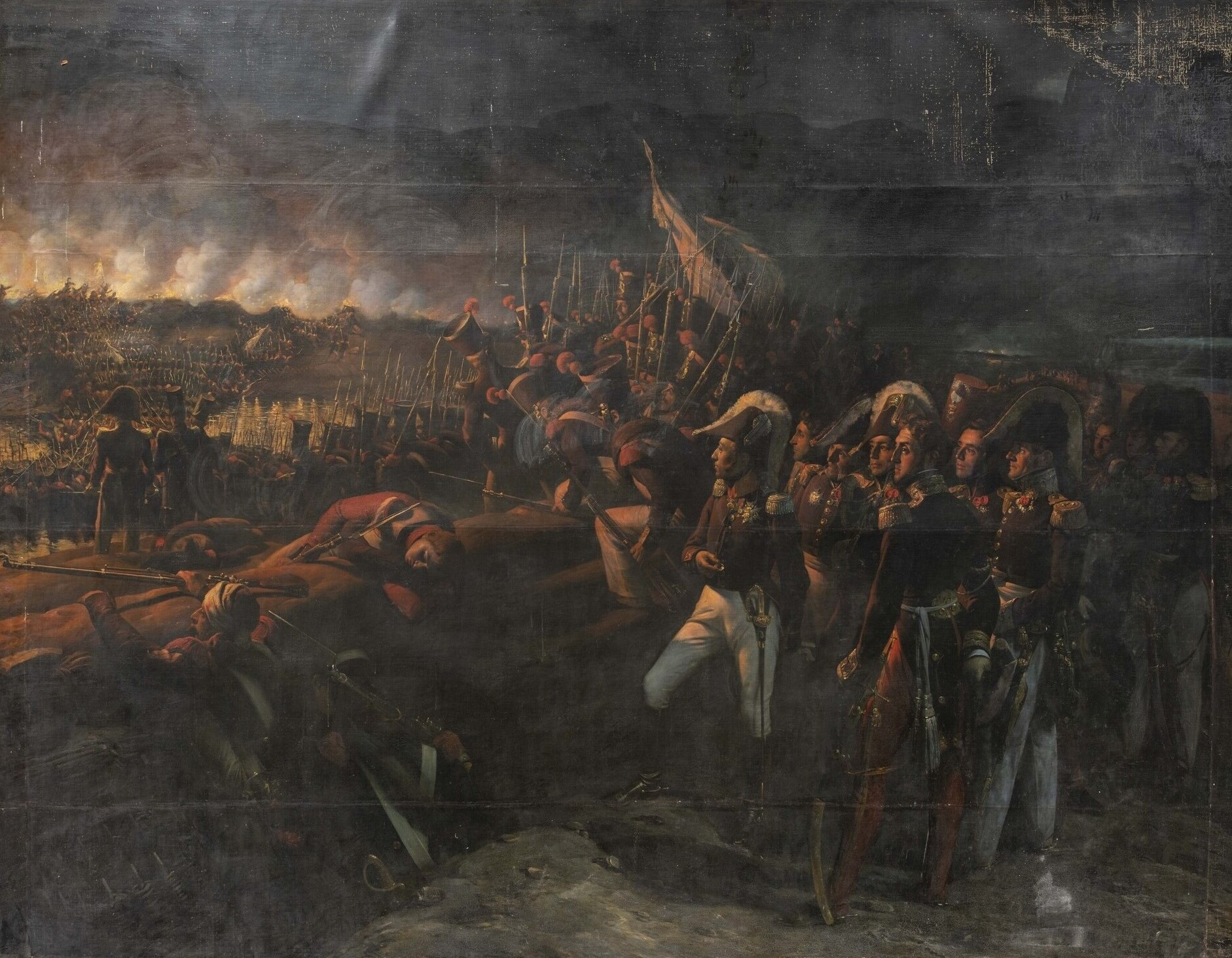
French troops attack Trocadero (1823)

On April 14, 1820, he fled to Montevideo, and from that city marched towards Rio de Janeiro, leaving South America forever in a British brig that transferred him to Gibraltar, being presented two years later in the department of Cádiz, Spain. Retired from active duty, Michelena established his residence in the town of Puerto Real. At the entrance of the French troops to the port of Cádiz, he put himself in command of Count Bordesoulle, who designates it to integrate the Navy of Sanlúcar.

In 1823, Juan Ángel Michelena served to the orders of Guy-Victor Duperré, participating in the bombing against the port of Cádiz, in order to reinstate the regime of Ferdinand VII of Spain. These actions earned him the title of knight of The Order of Saint Hermenegild, being distinguished with the Cross of the Marina Laureate and Legion of Honour of France.

In 1825, Michelena was appointed Governor of Ferrol, being promoted to the naval rank of brigadier in 1826. He died in 1831, after being elected as governor of Castellón de la Plana.
