= Battle of Campichuelo =

1810 battle during the Paraguay Campaign of the Argentine War of Independence

- Part of Paraguay campaign
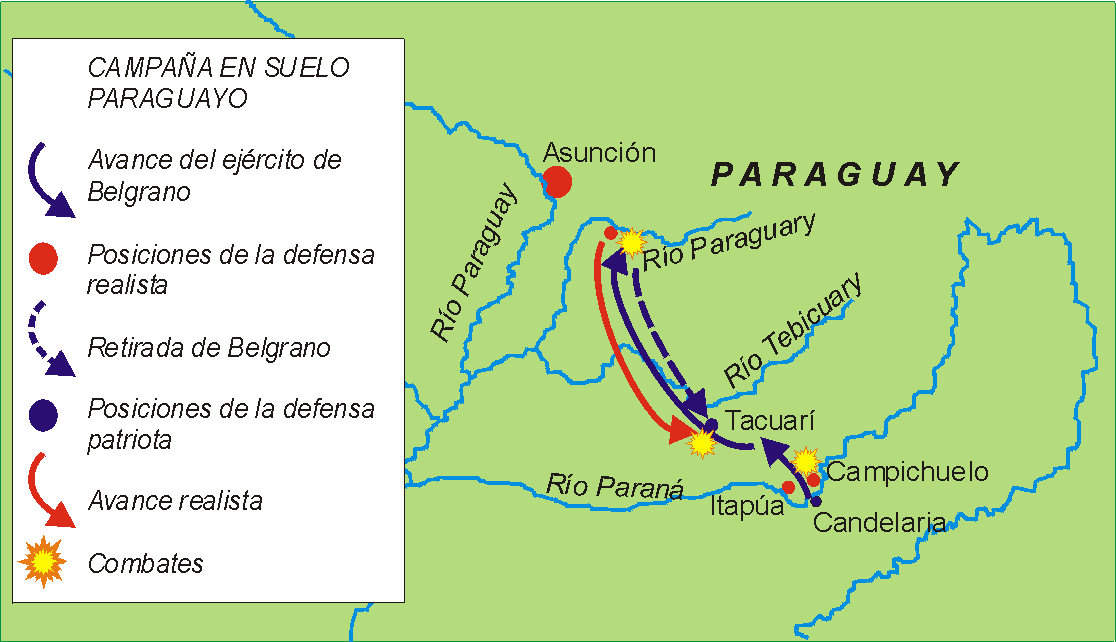
- Military operations in Paraguay (in Spanish)
Date	19 December 1810
Location	Campichuelo, near Encarnación, Paraguay
Result	Provinces of the Río the la Plata victory

Belligerents
(Spain) Provinces of the Río de la Plata (Note: The Provinces of the Río de la Plata were loyal to the Junta of Buenos Aires.)	(Spain) Intendency of Paraguay (Note: The Intendency of Paraguay was loyal to the Council of Regency of Spain and the Indies.)

Commanders and leaders
(Spain) Manuel Belgrano	(Spain) Pablo Thompson

Strength
800 soldiers	500 soldiers

The Battle of Campichuelo was a skirmish that took place on 19 December 1810 when the military expedition sent by the Primera Junta crossed the Paraná River from Candelaria to Campichuelo de la Candelaria, where a Paraguayan outpost was positioned. The action ended without casualties from either side.

== Antecedents ==
The Primera Junta, established in Buenos Aires after the May Revolution, launched a military campaign to ensure Paraguay's adherence, in the belief that a majority of Paraguayans supported it. The army was sent under Belgrano's command on 24 September.

== The battle ==
Because Paraguayans had removed all boats on the Paraná River along its borders, Belgrano's forces had to build boats from leather, some canoes and large wooden rafts suitable to carry 60 men and four cannon, as the crossing was expected to be opposed. The river was 1000 meters wide at the crossing point, and the current would carry them a league and a half downstream, to Campichuelo hill. The passage started at 11:00 pm on 18 December, when a force of 12 men surprised the enemy, taking two prisoners and some weapons. The main crossing took place from 3:00 am until 6:00 am on 19 December under the command of Major General Machain, forcing the enemy to abandon their position.
