= Manuel Michelena Iguarán =

Spanish politician (1940–2025)

Member of the Basque Parliament
- In office 22 June 2007 – 28 March 2011

Personal details
- Born: 28 October 1940 Errenteria, Gipuzkoa, Spain
- Died: 22 February 2025 (aged 84) San Sebastián, Gipuzkoa, Spain
- Party: Union of the Democratic Centre; People's Party of the Basque Country

Manuel Michelena Iguarán (28 October 1940 – 22 February 2025) was a Spanish industrial engineer and politician. He served as a member of the Basque Parliament from 2007 to 2011.

== Life and career ==
Michelena was born in the Guipuzcoan town of Errenteria on 28 October 1940. He completed his studies in Industrial Engineering. His beginnings in politics date back to the Transition, where he joined the Union of the Democratic Centre (UCD). He was later a regional deputy (1981–1982); Councillor (1999–2011); and councillor of the People's Party in the Town Halls of Usurbil (2003–2007), and Lizartza (2007–2011).

Michelena assumed leadership positions in the People's Party of the Basque Country on two occasions: replacing the parliamentarians for Gipuzkoa, María San Gil (2008) and Arantza Quiroga (2015).

Michelena died in San Sebastián on 22 February 2025, at the age of 84.
