= Paraguay campaign =

1810-1811 campaign launched by the Primera Junta against the Intendancy of Paraguay

Paraguay Campaign
- Part of the Spanish American wars of independence
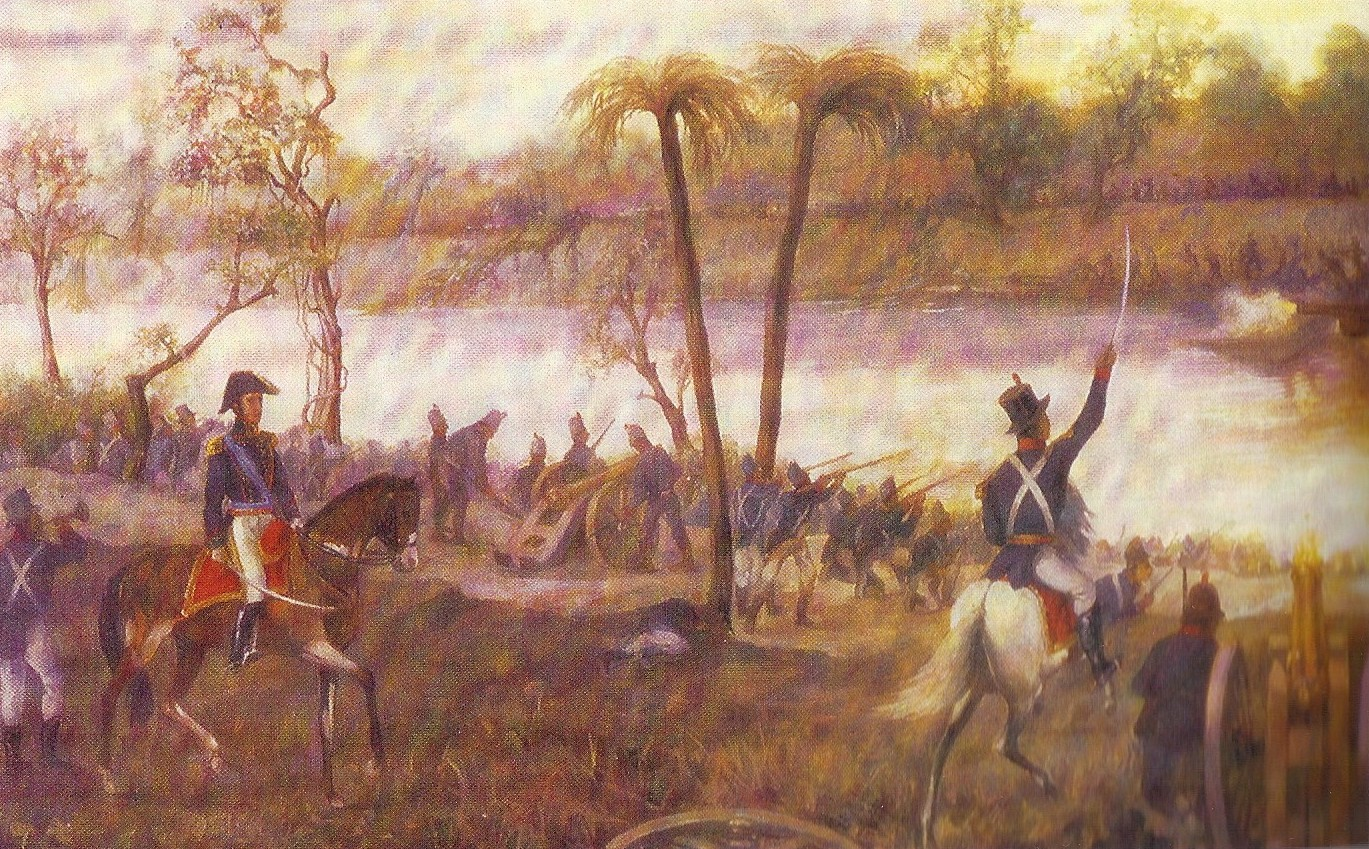
- Argentine forces crossing the Paraná River
Date	22 September 1810 – 21 March 1811
Location	Paraguay
Result	Spanish-Paraguayan victory; Paraguay achieved independence from Buenos Aires. Months later, it would proclaim independence from Spain.

Belligerents
(Spain) Provinces of the Río de la Plata (Note: The Provinces of the Río de la Plata were loyal to the Junta of Buenos Aires.)	(Spain) Intendency of Paraguay (Note: The Intendency of Paraguay was loyal to the Council of Regency of Spain and the Indies.)

Commanders and leaders
(Spain) Manuel Belgrano	(Spain) Bernardo de Velasco (Spain) Fulgencio Yegros

Strength
Around 1,000–2,000	Spanish troops: ~1,500; Paraguayan patriots: ~3,500

Casualties and losses
Around 500–1,000 men (killed, wounded and prisoners)	Around 500–1,000 men (killed, wounded and prisoners)

The Paraguay campaign (1810-1811) was a military expedition launched by Buenos Aires and commanded by Manuel Belgrano to ensure the adherence of the Intendency of Paraguay to the Primera Junta, which was established after the May Revolution. It is considered both a part of the independence of Argentina and Paraguay.

The first battles fought were the Battle of Campichuelo and Battle of Campo Maracana, in which the Junta of Buenos Aires army claimed victory. However, they were completely vanquished in the subsequent Battle of Paraguarí and Battle of Tacuarí. The campaign ended in a military failure and Paraguay breaking its links with the Spanish crown just two months after Belgrano's withdrawal, starting its course towards full independence.

== Actions of the Primera Junta ==
Three months after the creation of the Primera Junta, Manuel Belgrano was appointed Chief Commander of an army destined to gather support at Corrientes, Santa Fe, Paraguay and the Banda Oriental territories. A few days later his goal was made more specific: he must aim for Paraguay. The Junta had been informed that their image was favorable there, and a small army would suffice to take control. Trusting such information, Belgrano moved towards Paraguay with two possible goals—to guarantee loyalty for the Junta in Paraguay or promote a new government that would stay on friendly terms with Buenos Aires.

Belgrano headed north with nearly 200 men, expecting to gather more soldiers on his way to the Paraná River. Soldiers from the Blandengues regiments of San Nicolás and Santa Fe did join him en route, and later the junta sent reinforcements of another 200 soldiers. The army was welcomed by most of the population they encountered along the way, receiving donations and new recruits in most villages. Finally the small army grew to nearly 950 men, consisting of infantry and cavalry, divided into four divisions with one piece of artillery each.

== The Paraguayan Congress of July 24th, 1810 ==
"This Congress will not discuss whether it's the sodomite King (of Spain) or his weak son, our ruler. None of them have anymore power upon Paraguay. This Congress must discuss the way of protecting our independence from Brazil, Buenos Aires and Lima... Paraguay is free, is independent and it is a Republic..."

— José Gaspar Rodríguez de Francia, phD. Speech in the Paraguayan Congress of July 24th, 1810, according to F. Francisco Xavier de Bogarin.

Paraguay was a rather isolated region of the Viceroyalty of the Río de la Plata, which made the ideas of regional independence stronger than in other provinces of the Viceroyalty. The road to Paraguayan independence began at the Congress of July 24, 1810, which was called by the last colonial governor to express the province's loyalty to the Council of Regency of Spain. Paraguayans indeed refused to pledge themselves to the Primera Junta of Buenos Aires and agreed to remain loyal to the Council—yet the process of independence started here, as many Paraguayans, led by José Gaspar Rodríguez de Francia and other patriots, took control of the situation and started working to obtain independence, both from the United Provinces of the Río de la Plata and the Kingdom of Spain.

Belgrano ignored all this when he invaded Paraguay, believing that he would find a favorable political situation. There were three main political tendencies in Paraguay: those who supported the Council of Regency of the metropolis, those who supported the Junta of Buenos Aires and those who supported independence.

== The campaign ==
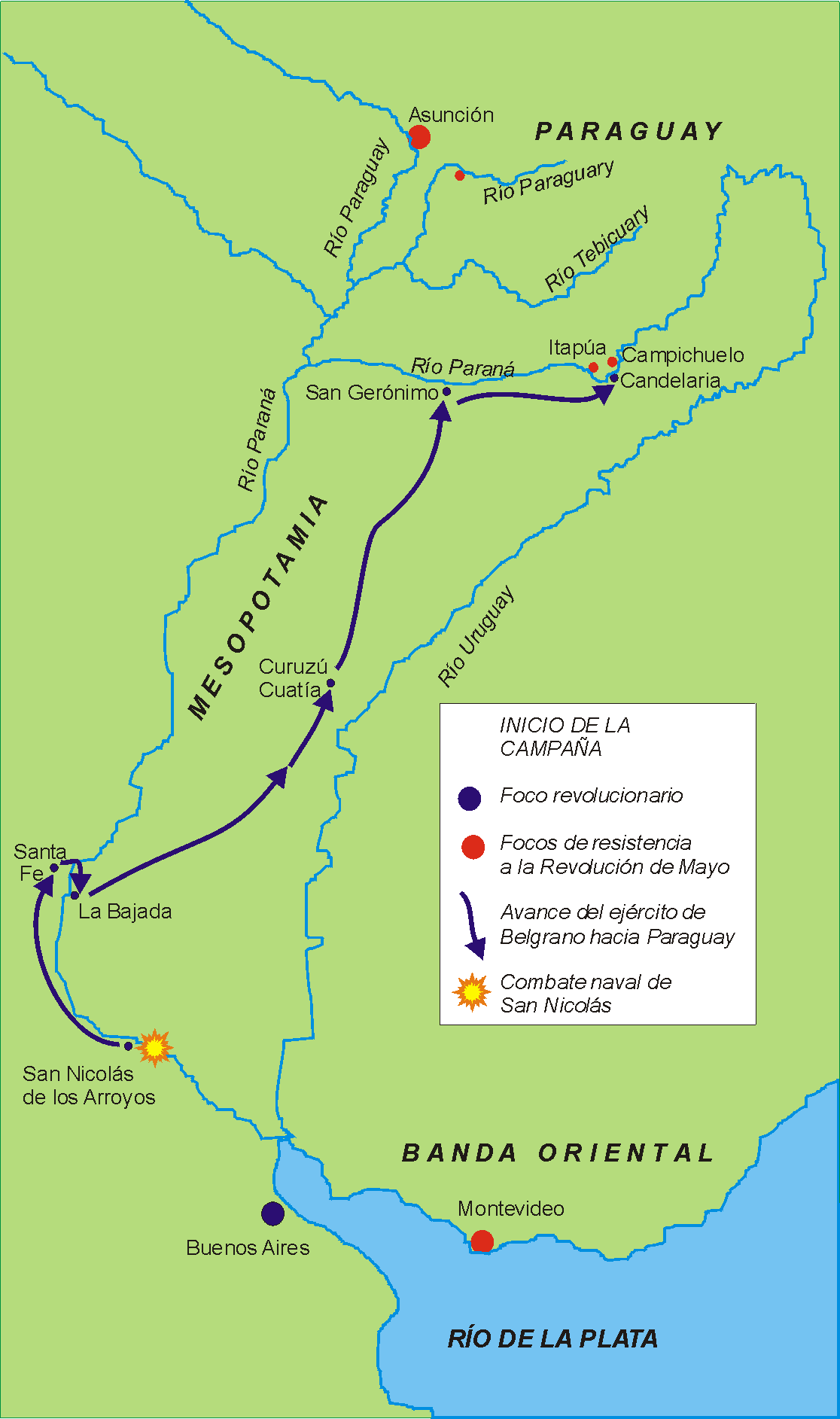
Belgrano's route to Paraguay

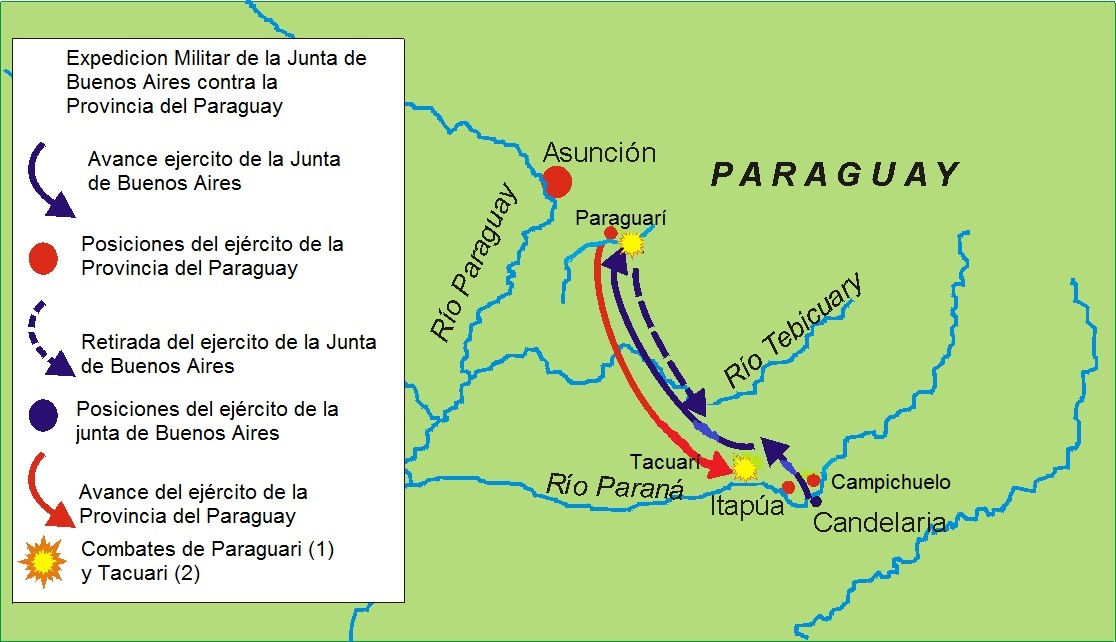
Belgrano's campaign against Paraguay

By the end of October Belgrano's army stopped at Curuzú Cuatiá, where an old border conflict between Corrientes and Yapeyu was solved. He set the territories that would belong to Curuzu Cuatiá and Mandisoví, and organized their urban layout around the chapel and the school. By November 1810 the army reached the Paraná River near Apipé island, and there Belgrano took measures to benefit the natives that were living in missions. With his authority as representative of the Junta he gave them full civil and political rights, granted lands, authorized commerce with the United Provinces and lifted the inability to take public or religious office. However, the junta later requested that he seek authorization for such changes in the future.

From that point the army moved to Candelaria, which was used as a stronghold for the attack on Paraguay. The terrain gave a clear advantage to Velazco's Paraguayan troops, who confronted Belgrano: the Paraná River, nearly 1,000 m. wide, was an effective natural barrier; once it was crossed the Argentine army would have to move for a long distance across a land without supplies. Swamps, hills, rivers and lakes would also force the army to march slowly, making a possible retreat difficult. The Parana was crossed with several boats on December 19, and a force of 54 Paraguayan soldiers was forced to flee during the Battle of Campichuelo.

Belgrano saw Velazco's army from the Mbaé hill, and despite being greatly outnumbered he ordered the attack anyway, trusting in the moral strength of his soldiers. When the Battle of Paraguarí started, Belgrano's troops had an initial advantage, but eventually Velazco's numerical superiority prevailed, thanks to the intervention of the Paraguayan patriots, around 3,500 men, resulting in the combined Paraguayan forces vastly outnumbering the Belgrano's. Even with casualties of ten dead and 120 taken prisoner, Belgrano wanted to keep on fighting, but his officers convinced him to retreat. His intent to continue was actually based on sound military tactics: while the Paraguayan forces outnumbered his, he knew that they were barely armed, while his troops had full equipment and supplies.

The army left for Tacuarí, being closely watched by the combined armies of Fulgencio Yegros and Manuel Atanasio Cabañas. Those two armies consisted of nearly 3000 troops, while Belgrano was left with barely 400. They were attacked from many sides during the Battle of Tacuarí on March 9. Greatly outnumbered and losing an unequal fight, Belgrano was requested to surrender, but refused to do so. He reorganized his remaining 235 men and ordered his secretary to burn all his documents and personal papers to prevent them from falling into enemy hands. He arranged for the troops and artillery to fire constantly, forcing the Paraguayan troops to disperse. When the fire stopped he requested an armistice, telling Cabañas that he had arrived in Paraguay to aid and not to conquer, but considering the open hostility he had found, he would leave the province. Cabañas accepted, on the condition that they left Paraguay within a day.

== Aftermath ==
The Paraguay campaign was a complete defeat for the Primera Junta from a military point of view. For Paraguay, the defeat of Belgrano resulted in independence from Buenos Aires, and was followed for independence from Spain. Paraguay and Buenos Aires maintained good relationships later, thoug not being part of the same political entity anymore.

== See also ==
- Manuel Belgrano
- Argentine War of Independence
- History of Paraguay

== Bibliography ==
- Luna, Félix (2004). Grandes protagonistas de la Historia Argentina: Manuel Belgrano (in Spanish). Buenos Aires: Grupo Editorial Planeta. ISBN 950-49-1247-8.
- García Mellid, Atilio (1964). Proceso a los Falsificadores de la Historia del Paraguay, Volumen I (in Spanish). Buenos Aires: Ediciones Theoria.
- Thompson, George (1869). The War in Paraguay. With a historical sketch of the country and its people and notes upon the military engineering of the war. London: Longmans, Green and Co.
- Bray, Arturo (1954). Hombres y Epocas del Paraguay, Primer Volúmen (in Spanish). Asunción: Ediciones Niza.
- Mitre, Bartolomé (2011). Historia de Belgrano y la Independencia Argentina, Dos Volúmenes (in Spanish and English). U.S.: Nabu Press. ISBN 9781247596389.
- Vittone, Luis (1976). Dos Siglos de Política Nacional (in Spanish). Asunción: Imprenta Militar.
- Moreno, Fulgencio R. (1926). Estudios sobre la Independencia del Paraguay, Volumen I (in Spanish). Asunción: Ediciones América.
