= Battle of Paraguarí =

1811 battle during the Paraguay Campaign of the Argentine War of Independence

Coordinates: 25°38′0″S 57°9′0″W

- Part of Paraguay campaign
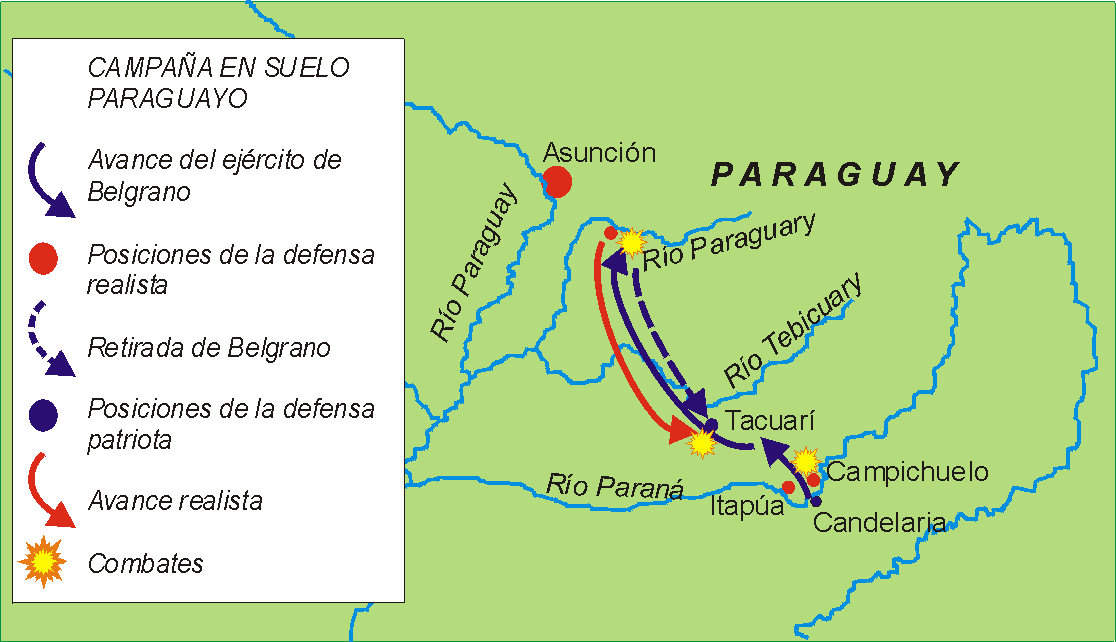
- Military operations in Paraguay (in Spanish)
Date	January 19, 1811
Location	Paraguarí, Paraguay
Result	Paraguayan victory; Belgrano forced to withdraw southward

Belligerents
(Spain) Provinces of the Río de la Plata (Note: The Provinces of the Río de la Plata were loyal to the Junta of Buenos Aires.)	(Spain) Intendency of Paraguay (Note: The Intendency of Paraguay was loyal to the Council of Regency of Spain and the Indies.)

Commanders and leaders
(Spain) Manuel Belgrano	(Spain) Bernardo de Velasco

Strength
1,000 soldiers	4,600 soldiers

Casualties and losses
120 prisoners, 10 deaths	16 prisoners, 30 deaths

The Battle of Paraguarí, also known as Battle of Cerro Porteño, took place on January 19, 1811 nearby Paraguarí between the army sent by the Primera Junta and the forces of the Intendency of Paraguay under the command of their governor Bernardo de Velasco. The battle ended with a Paraguayan victory and boosted confidence to declare independence from both Buenos Aires and Spain.

== Background ==
At the outbreak of the May Revolution in Buenos Aires, the government emerged from it, the self denominated Provisional Government Junta of the Provinces of the Río de la Plata in the name of Lord Don Ferdinand VII, invited other cities and provinces of the former Viceroyalty of the Río de la Plata to recognize their provisional authority and send deputies.

As a result of an open cabildo in Asunción, the governor of Paraguay Bernardo de Velasco, didn't recognize the Junta of Buenos Aires and swore loyalty to the Council of Regency of Spain and the Indies, which was considered an illegitimate regime by the Junta. Un aware of this, and in the belief that a majority of Paraguayans supported Buenos Aires government, the Junta sent a small military expedition commanded by General Manuel Belgrano to ensure Paraguay's adherence through negotiations or force.

Belgrano's army entered into Paraguayan territory, overcoming slight resistance in the Battle of Campichuelo. After this, they crossed the Tebicuary River on 11 January, finding abandoned villages since Velasco evacuated them with his retreat.

During the night of January 15, Belgrano sent a vanguard of 200 men and 2 guns to surprise the Paraguayans, but the attack never took place. The next morning, he was positioned himself on a hill, from where he watched the Paraguayan camp. Although the enemy force at least exceeded theirs by a ratio of ten to one, decided to attack without exhausting the possibilities to negotiate.

Although Belgrano had sent several proclamations to the Paraguayans, inviting them to recognize the Junta, Velasco banned all such pamphlets. Belgrano considered if he succeeded, it would open the entrance to Asunción. And if he was defeated, at least his army was far enough inside enemy territory to avoid being completely expelled. On the other hand, it is possible that he and his officers despised the combat capability of Paraguayans and overestimated the possibility of inspiring patriotic enthusiasm.

== The battle ==
Belgrano organized his infantry into two rows of 220 and 240 men, and placed Machain's cavalry on the right and Perdriel's on the left (100 riders each). In reserve back at Cerro Mbae, were 70 riders and militia guarding the baggage train.

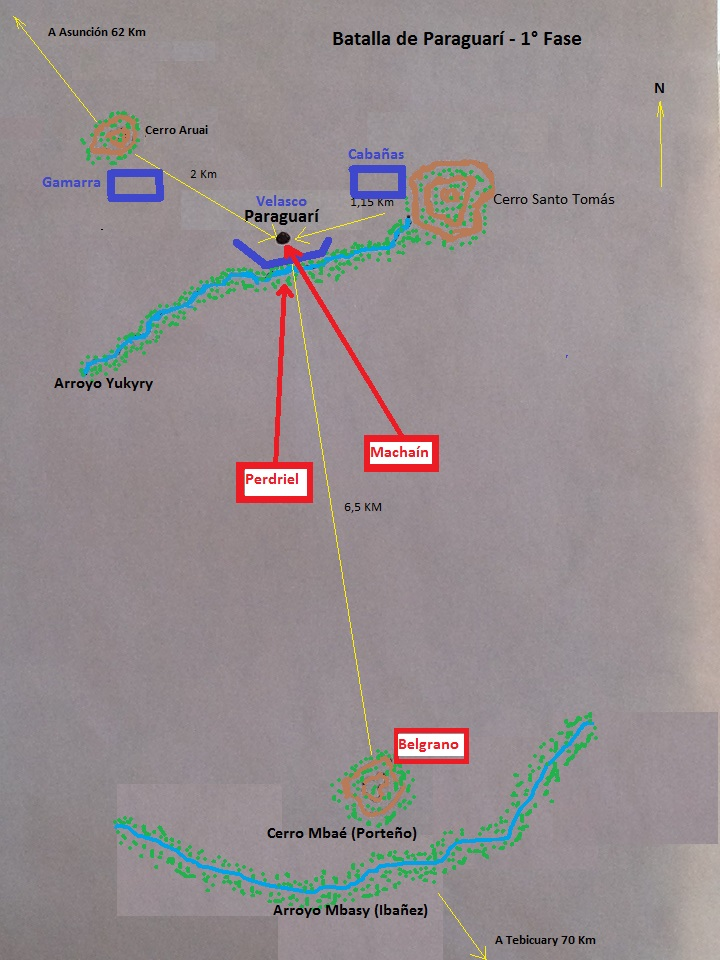
Battle of Paraguarí. Red: Belgrano's forces. Azul: Velasco's forces

After ordering that his troops mass out 3:00 in the morning on January 19, Belgrano ordered the advance. An hour later, the fighting was widespread. The attack came as a surprise to the Paraguayans, forcing them to abandon their positions. The governor Velasco fled towards Asuncion. But the cavalry, commanded by Manuel Cabañas withdrew without fighting and deployed on the flanks of the attacking army.

The patriots were distracted in looting the food stores of the Paraguayan army, so that only half of the force continued to fight, while the defenders were rearming themselves. To make matters worse, when Belgrano sent reinforcements of about 120 men, under the command of his aide Ramon Espindola, in support of Machain. Machain believing they were the enemy, ordereded a retreat.

Amidst the confusion, the Paraguayan wings commanded by Gamarra and Cabanas, surrounded Espindola and Machain. Machain escaped but Espindola was killed.

Considering that everything was lost, Belgrano ordered a withdrawal to the south.

== Consequences ==
The Battle of Paraguari was not a final victory for the Paraguayan royalists since Belgrano still had his army, but the government had been saved, and the province could not be compelled to submit to the government of Buenos Aires.

Weeks later, Belgrano would be definitively defeated at the Battle of Tacuarí and expelled from Paraguay.

Months later, Paraguay declared independence from Spain. The unitarian tendency of the successive governments of Buenos Aires, on the other hand, reinforced the decision to pursue full independence.
