= Battle of Buceo =

1814 naval battle of the Argentine War of Independence

The Battle of Buceo was a decisive naval battle which took place on 14–17 May 1814, during the Argentine War of Independence between an Argentine fleet under Irish-born naval commander William Brown and a Spanish fleet under Admiral Sierra off the coast of Montevideo, in today's Uruguay.

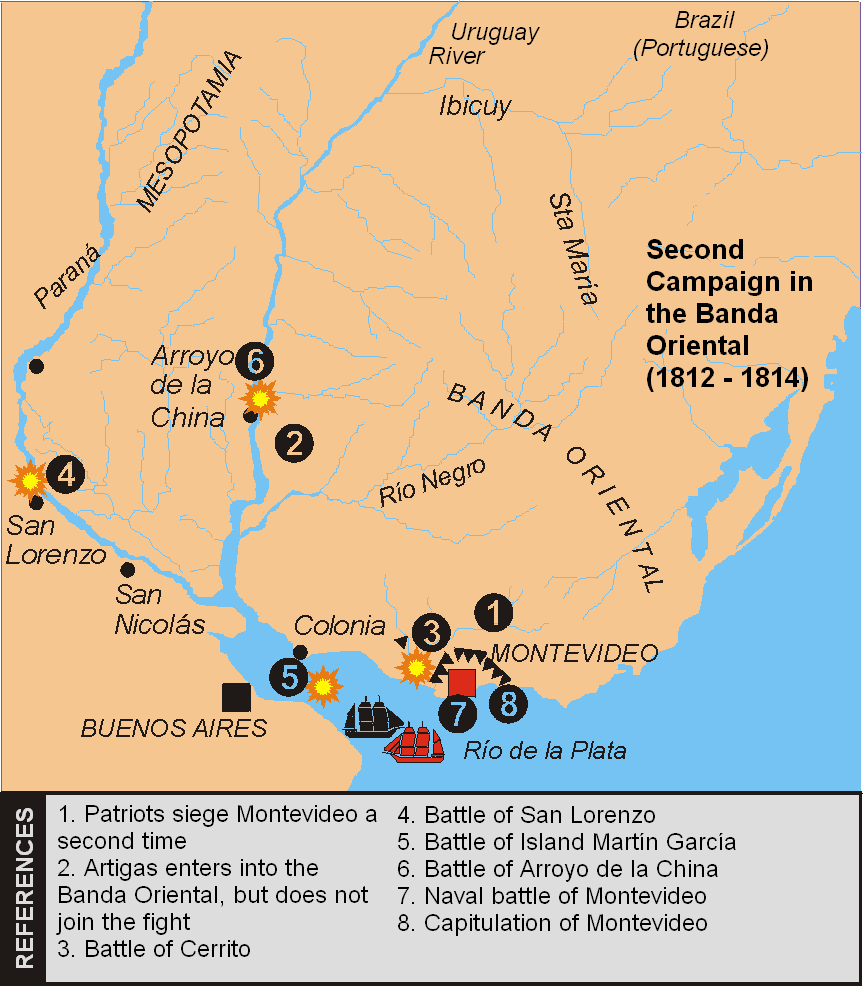
Military operations in the Eastern Band and the littoral region, 1812–14

== Outcome ==
Five Spanish ships were burned and two were captured on 17 May. The other surrendered later and 500 prisoners were taken. Argentine forces lost four men killed in action and one ship. William Brown was given the rank of admiral because of this victory.

== Ships involved ==
=== Provinces of the Río de la Plata (William Brown) ===
Hercules 32 (flag)
Zephyr 18 (King)
Nancy 10 (Leech)
Julietta 7 (McDougald)
Belfast 18 (Oliver Russell)
Agreeable 16 (Lemare)
Trinidad 12 (Wack)

=== Spain (Sienna) ===
Hyena 18 (flag)
Mercurio 32
Neptuno 28 – Captured by Belfast 16 May
Mercedes 20
Palomo 18 – Captured 16 May
San Jose 16 – Captured 16 May
Cisne 12
6 schooners

== See also ==
- Battle of Martín García (1814)
