= Intendancy of Paraguay =

Intendancy of the Spanish Empire

Intendancy of Paraguay Intendencia del Paraguay (Spanish)
- Spanish intendancy of the River Plate
- 1782–1811
- Flag of Spain Coat of arms

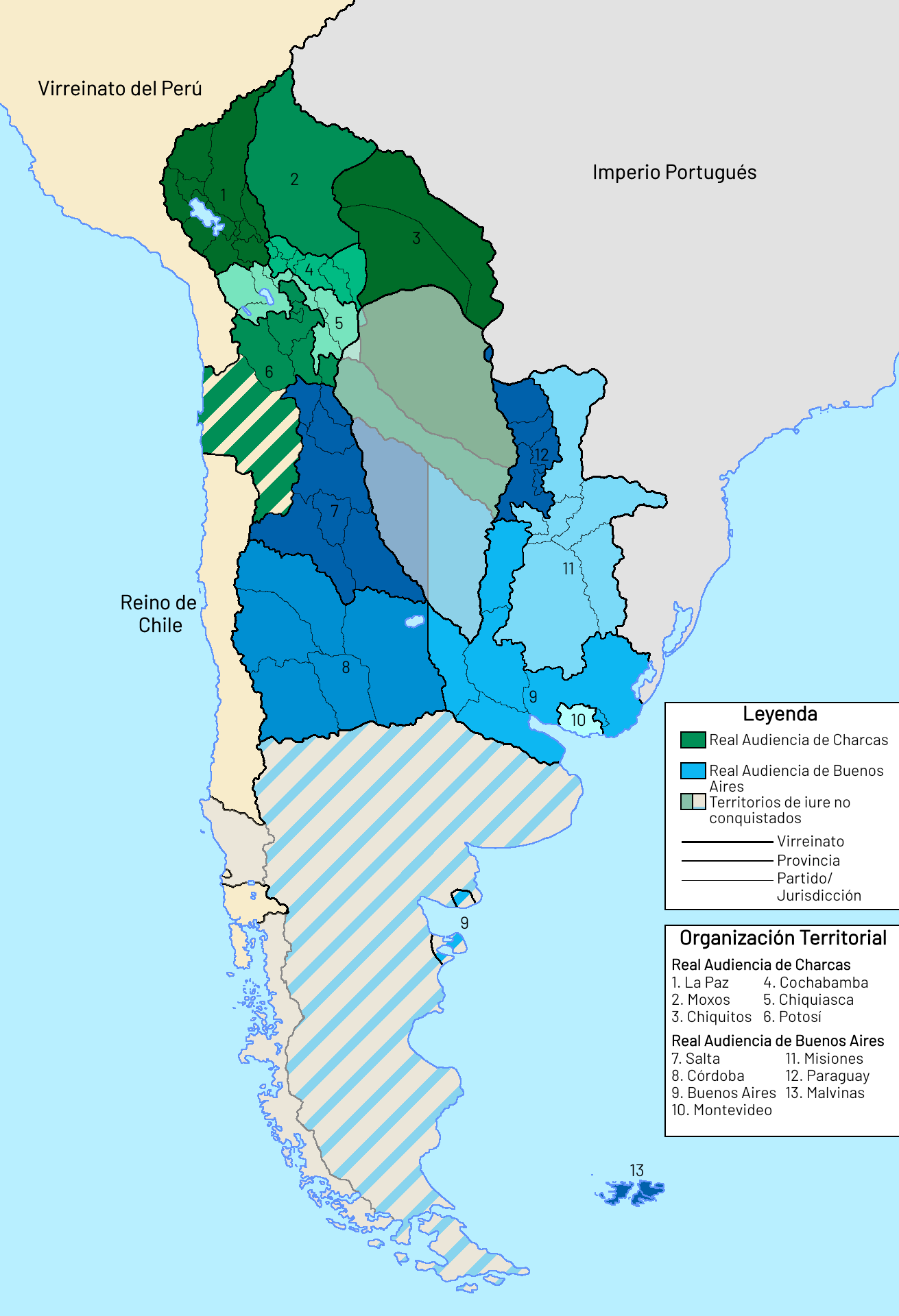
- Intendancies of the Viceroyalty of the River Plate encompassed by the audiencias of Charcas and Buenos Aires in 1783
- Capital: Asunción
- Population
  - 1785: 90,000
  - 1799: 108,070
  - 1806: 140,000
- Status: Intendancy of the Viceroyalty of the River Plate within the Kingdom of Spain and the Indies
- Government
  - Type: Intendancy
- Intendant
  - 1782–1787: P. Melo de Portugal
  - 1787-1796: Joaquín Alós y Bru
  - 1796-1806: L. de Ribera y Espinoza
  - 1806-1807: Bernardo de Velasco
  - 1807-1808: M. Gutiérrez Varona
  - 1808-1809: Eustaquio Giannini
  - 1809–1811: Bernardo de Velasco
- History
  - Established: 28 January 1782
  - May Revolution: 25 May 1810
  - Battle of Paraguarí: 19 January 1811
  - Abolished: 14 May 1811
Preceded by	Succeeded by
Governorate of Paraguay	Republic of Paraguay

The Intendancy of Paraguay (Spanish: Intendencia del Paraguay), also known as the Intendancy of Asunción (Spanish: Intendencia de Asunción) was an administrative-territorial unit that was part of the Viceroyalty of Rio de la Plata. It was created on 28 January 1782 and came to an end after the May 1811 Revolution.

== History ==
Until 1776, the whole of Southern Spanish America was ruled by the Viceroy of Peru in Lima.
Because of the vastness of its territory, the Viceroyalty of Peru was subdivided in several Governates, with its own Governor. Two of these Governates were the Governorate of the Río de la Plata and the Governorate of Paraguay.

In 1776, it was decided to split the Viceroyalty of Peru in two, and to create a new Viceroyalty of the Río de la Plata, which included these two former governates, along with other dependencies that mainly extended over the Río de la Plata Basin, roughly the present-day territories of Argentina, Chile, Bolivia, Paraguay and Uruguay.

As subdivision of the new Viceroyalty of the Río de la Plata, the Intendancy of Paraguay was created on 28 January 1782, which covered the same territory as the Governate of Paraguay, on both sides of the Paraguay River and also part of the former Guarani Missions.

The political body that controlled the government of the intendancy was the Intendant Governor (Spanish: Gobernador intendente). The only city and capital of the Intendancy was Asunción, and territorially it was divided into 4 districts: Concepción, Curuguaty, Villarrica and San Pedro de Ycuamandiyú.

The Intendancy of Paraguay existed until 1811, when the last Intendant governor, Bernardo de Velasco, was overthrown by a group of revolutionaries, marking the end of Spanish rule in these lands and marking the beginning of the events leading to the Independence of Paraguay.

=== Intendant Governors of Paraguay ===
- Pedro Melo de Portugal (1782–1787) (was already Governor of Paraguay before 1782)
- Joaquín Alós y Brú (1787–1796)
- Lázaro de Ribera y Espinoza (1796–1806)
- Bernardo de Velasco (1806–1807)
- Manuel Gutiérrez Varona, acting (1807–1808)
- Eustaquio Giannini, acting (1808–1809)
- Bernardo de Velasco (1809–1811)

== Sources ==
- Oficio de la Junta al Juez Comisionado D. Juan José Chaparro, del 26 de noviembre de 1812 describiendo las competencias de los Subdelegados de Intendencia, Archivo Nacional de Asunción, Sección Historia, Vol. 218, N. 1, Copia autorizada.
- Revista chilena de historia del derecho, Volumen 14. Pág. 91. Publicaciones del Seminario de Historia y Filosofía del Derecho de la Facultad de Ciencias Jurídicas y Sociales de la Universidad de Chile. Editor: Editorial Jurídica de Chile, 1991
- Geografía, física y esférica de las provincias del Paraguay y misiones guaraníes. Pág. 442. Autores: Félix de Azara, Rodolfo R. Schuller. Publicado en 1804
