= Bernardo de Velasco =

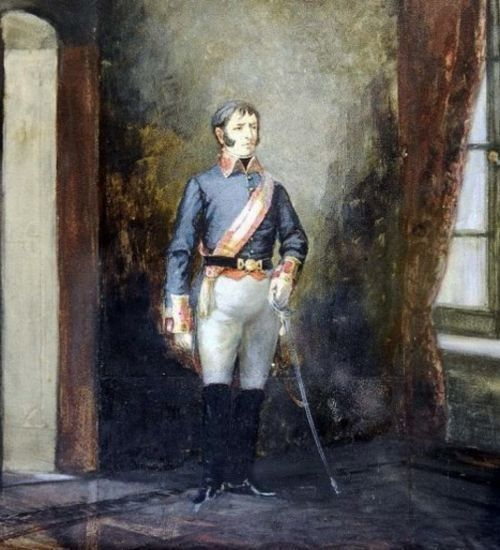
- Portrait by Guglielmo Da Re, 1890

Intendent Governor of Paraguay
- In office 5 May 1806 – 17 June 1811
- Preceded by: Lázaro de Ribera y Espinoza
- Succeeded by: Post abolished (replaced by Superior Governing Junta of the Province of Paraguay)

Military and political governor of the thirty towns of the Missions
- In office 9 October 1804 – 17 June 1811
- Monarch: Charles IV of Spain
- Preceded by: Santiago de Liniers, 1st Count of Buenos Aires

Personal details
- Born: Bernardo Luis de Velasco y Huidobro; 20 August 1742 Villadiego, Burgos, Spain
- Died: Unknown, possibly around 1821 Asunción, Paraguay
- Occupation: Military

Bernardo Luis de Velasco y Huidobro (20 August 1742 – c. 1821) was a figure in the Spanish American wars of independence, the last Spanish governor of the Intendency of Paraguay and a commander of royalist military forces in the war. He was deposed by the congress celebrated in Asunción on 17 June 1811. He was born in Villadiego, Burgos, Spain.

== Early life ==
He was the second son of Miguel Gervasio de Velasco Fernández de Humada and Josefa Gabriela de Huidobro y Mier. He was baptized on 26 August in the same year of his birth in the Church of San Lorenzo Intramuros by one of his mother's relatives, the priest Pedro de Mier y Terán. He studied mathematics in Barcelona and at the age of 25 he entered the army. He participated from 1793 to 1795 in the War of the Pyrenees against the French troops. He was a man of good appearance, courteous, affable, with classical and scientific knowledge. These characteristics, added to his military performance, figured as a favorable antecedent in the recommendation for his election among the candidates for governor of Paraguay written by his superior:

He has always had credit for higher instruction than the previous two [...] His 36 years of service are certain and he has contracted a distinguished merit of war in them.

— "Inspector general del ejército, Madrid, 17 de marzo de 1803" (17 March 1803). Inspector general del ejército. Simancas, Province of Valladolid, Spain: General Archive of Simancas, AGS.

The candidate definitely had the conditions to carry out the Bourbonic ideal of militarizing the Indian civil administration in order to achieve order, prompt obedience and discipline. Velasco did not hide his fear of governing due to his self-descriptive lack of knowledge as recorded in an expedient from c. 1804 cited by historian Ezequiel Abásolo:

Such was the situation of [...] Velasco, who at the time of being proposed to direct the destinies of the Missions, he made present "that the office of a political government" imposed him "the greatest fear, lacking the knowledge to handle the affairs" with knack, "reason why in the case of being selected by the King, he would only remain with" the consolation that the mistakes or faults committed by him would be unintentional.

— Abásolo E (2010). "La militarización borbónica de las Indias como trasfondo de las experiencias políticas revolucionarias" [The Bourbonic militarization of the Indias as background of the political revolutionary Platine experiences] (PDF). Rechtsgeschichte (16): 158.

Due to the ruinous state of the Guarani reductions after the expulsion of the Jesuits, the King Charles IV decided to create, by a Royal Decree on 28 March 1803, a military and political government of the called "thirty towns of the old Guarani Missions". For that purpose, through Royal Cédula of 17 May 1803, he named him its governor. It consisted of a particular government as it was declared autonomous and independent from the provinces of Buenos Aires and Paraguay. The Lieutenant colonel Velasco arrived in Buenos Aires in January 1804 and on 2 August, the viceroy Joaquín del Pino authorized the cost of the trip with soldiers, an adviser, servants and luggage that would join him. After remaining stopped in Yapeyú due to the rain, Velasco arrived in Candelaria on 8 October 1804. On the next day, Santiago de Liniers, interim governor, transferred him the command.

== Military and political governor of the towns of the Missions ==
Velasco was promoted to colonel in June 1804. Taking into consideration the state of the militias and the Lusitan expansionism over the zone, he proposed himself the creation of a force of 600 well-armed and disciplined soldiers, but due to a series of factors this could not overcome the third part. Another way of protecting the towns was to raise the ruinous state in which they were at the time, thus encouraging cattle raising and agriculture. He promoted education, which was extended to girls. He was one of the pioneers in smallpox vaccination. The efficient administration and his capacity for action produced an improvement in various economic aspects such as the production of leathers and yerba mate.

== Governor of the Province of Paraguay and the thirty towns of the Missions ==
The Intendant Governor of Paraguay, Lázaro de Ribera y Espinoza, had become a tyrannical, venal official, lacking sincerity and respect for his superiors. Furthermore, since 1789, he was harshly opposed to the Viceroy of the Río de la Plata Marquis of Avilés on the complex abolition of the community system of the Guarani peoples and its possible consequences. The controversy continued with the Viceroy del Pino, successor of Avilés since June 1801. In May 1803, the King disposed the abolition of the encomiendas and the liberation of the natives. Félix de Azara, the Spanish official that knew best the land, informed negatively about Ribera. He also suggested that the towns of the Missions, for military, cultural and administrative reasons, should join the Province of Paraguay under one sole governor. He proposed Colonel Velasco for the position.

Finally, King Charles IV decided by Royal Decree of 12 September 1805, to replace Lázaro de Ribera as Intendent Governor of Paraguay, by Bernardo de Velasco, who now had in his person the two governments, that of Paraguay and Misiones. He ruled until the beginning of 1807, when he was called by the Viceroy of the Río de la Plata to help organize the army to resist the British invasions of the River Plate. These invasions were repulsed and Bernardo de Velasco distinguished himself in the fighting.

During his absence he was replaced by Colonel Manuel Gutierrez Varona (1807–1808) and by Captain Eustaquio Giannini Bentallol (1808–1809). He finally returned to the government of the Province on 19 June 1809.

== Independence of Paraguay ==
The 1810 May Revolution in Buenos Aires triggered a series of events that ended with the Independence of Paraguay. First, Bernardo de Velasco repulsed an attack of the Argentinian rebels on Paraguay in the Battle of Paraguarí in January 1811. Later, in the months of March and April 1811, Velasco repressed some attempted uprisings in Asunción and kept Paraguay under the rule of the Spanish King.

The revolutionary coup of 15 May 1811 surprised him, as he was busy to contact the Portuguese to help secure Spanish power with Portuguese troops. He was forced to share power with two rebel leaders as a part of three-man junta.

On 9 June 1811 he was arrested and removed from power. Paraguay became an independent Republic, and Velasco disappeared from sight. Plans to ban him from Paraguay were not carried out, and it seems that he led a quiet life in Paraguay until his death around 1821–1822.
