= María Remedios del Valle =

Afro-Argentine camp follower turned soldier

- Official state portrait of María Remedios del Valle selected in 2021 and currently featured on 10,000-Argentine peso banknotes.
- Born: c. 1768; Buenos Aires, Viceroyalty of Peru, colonial Spanish America (present-day Argentina)
- Died: 1847 (aged 78–79); Buenos Aires, Argentine Confederation
- Military career
- Allegiance: (Argentina) United Provinces of the Río de la Plata
- Branch: Army of the North
- Service years: 1810–1818
- Nicknames: María Remedios Rosas, Remedios del Valle Rosas, Remedios Rosas
- Conflicts: Argentine war of independence; Battle of Huaqui; Jujuy Exodus; Battle of Tucumán; Battle of Salta; Battle of Vilcapugio; Battle of Ayohuma

María Remedios del Valle (ca. 1768–1847) also known as the "Madre de la Patria" (Mother of the Homeland) was a pardo soldier who participated in the Argentine War of Independence on the side of the United Provinces of the Río de la Plata.

Although initially a civilian camp follower, she joined the Army of the North and participated in several battles. She was captured by Spanish forces after the Battle of Ayohuma, but escaped. Her entire family was killed in the war. When the war ended, she returned to Buenos Aires and eventually turned to begging. Discovered by one of the generals under whom she had fought, she was approved for a pension which was paid over the last decade of her life.

Largely forgotten until the turn of the 21st century when Argentine historians began including the contributions of Black Argentines, she is now widely recognized for her contributions to the independence of the nation. Her portrait is on the 10,000 peso note released in May 2024.

== Early life ==
María Remedios del Valle was born in Buenos Aires, Argentina and was listed in her military records as a parda, a term formerly applied to triracial descendants of Europeans, Indigenous Americans, and West African slaves, that later became applied to people of mostly or entirely African descent. Testimony given in the 1828 Diario de Sesiones, a Congressional record, states that she was "sixty or more years old", placing her birth around 1768.

== Career ==
María Remedios del Valle, with her husband and two sons, accompanied the Army of the North, which had been deployed by the United Provinces of the Río de la Plata to liberate Peru and Upper Peru (now Peru and Bolivia) from Spain. This was the first military expedition to the interior and left Buenos Aires on 20 June 1810 under the command of Bernardo Joaquín de Anzoátegui captain of the Volante Artillery Battalion's 6th Company. Initially, del Valle was among the rabonas, or camp followers, who were recruited from the urban poor and rural peasantry to follow the troops and provide cooking and nursing services, carry arms and munitions, and gather intelligence which could assist the military.

The army arrived in December 1810 at Potosí. Del Valle's participation in the battles of "Huaqui (20 June 1811) and the army's subsequent retreat to Jujuy, the exodus from Jujuy (23 August 1812), the victories at Tucumán (24 September 1812) and Salta (20 February 1813), and the defeats at Vilcapugio (1 October 1813) and Ayohuma (14 November 1813)" were recorded. Prior to the Battle of Tucumán, she sought permission from General Manuel Belgrano to tend the troops who had fallen in the front lines. Belgrano denied permission, on the grounds that women were not suited for duty at the front. Ignoring his order, del Valle proceeded with her plan and was later recognized by Belgrano with the rank of captain in the army. During the Battle of Ayohuma, del Valle was wounded when she was shot by the enemy and taken as prisoner by the Spanish forces. During her captivity, she assisted several prisoners in escapes and was sentenced to be publicly flogged for nine consecutive days. She eventually escaped and returned to the army to assist with the battlefield wounded, remaining through the end of the conflict.

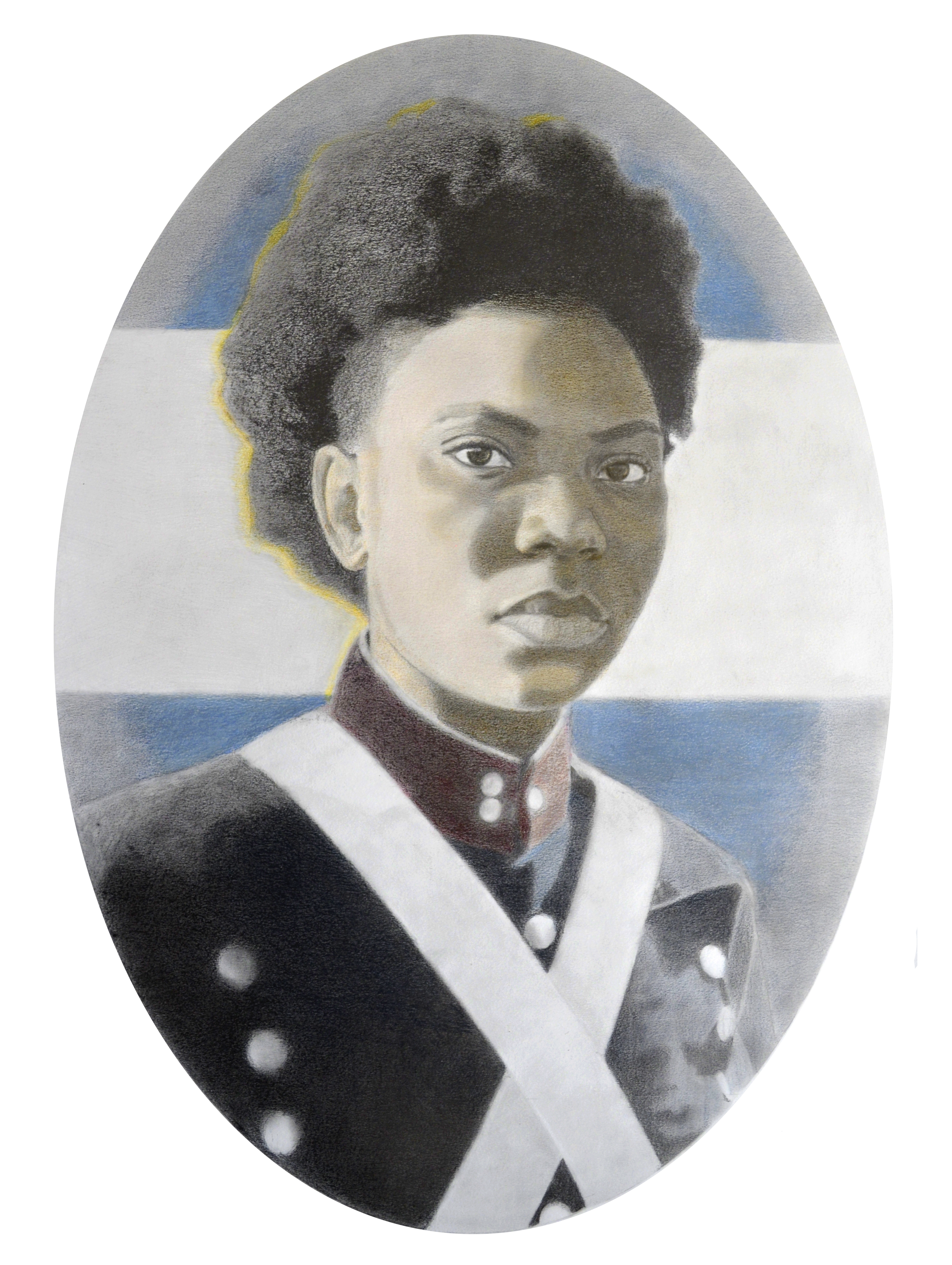
A modern depiction of del Valle

Little is known of del Valle's history after the war ended in 1818, until around 1826. It is known that her husband and two children were killed in the conflicts, though their causes of death remain unclear. On 23 October 1826, she applied for compensation for services rendered by her family during the Argentine War of Independence, but her claim was denied. Poor health and age limited her ability to provide for herself, and del Valle began begging for food at convents in the city. General Juan José Viamonte discovered her in the streets in a deplorable condition and petitioned the legislature on her behalf to provide her with a pension. Other generals showed their support for del Valle, such as Anzoátegui, who was then a captain; General Eustaquio Díaz Vélez, who testified that del Valle served as a guerrilla fighter and provider of aid to the wounded; and Colonel Hipólito Videla, who confirmed del Valle had been wounded and imprisoned at Ayohuma. An examination of del Valle's body confirmed that she had six scars evidencing she had been wounded by bullets and swords.

Tomás de Anchorena, a member of the legislature, also presented a case in her defense and the legislature agreed to grant del Valle a salary for the rank of captain of the infantry. This was later elevated to compensation as a sergeant major of the cavalry. Del Valle was placed in inactive status, with full salary corresponding to her rank in 1830. She continued receiving a pension until her death in 1847, though records show that between 1836 and 1847, payment was made to Remedios Rosas. It is thought that she changed her name in gratitude to the governor of Buenos Aires, Juan Manuel de Rosas, for the granting of her pension.

== Death and legacy ==
A note dated 8 November 1847 in the military archives pension records indicates Rosas had died. She first appeared in a history book in Argentina in the early 1930s, when Carlos Ibarguren published her story and in 1944 Buenos Aires named a street in her honour.

However, she was largely forgotten until the beginning of the 21st century, when Afro-Argentines, activists and scholars began to include the history of people who had been left out of the historiography of the country because of deliberate discrimination based on gender and race. She is now widely recognized for her contributions and numerous publications have retold her story. Since 2013, 8 November is celebrated in her honor, as the National Day of Afro-Argentines and African Culture.

In May 2022, the Mint of Argentina issued a AR$10000 banknote featuring the image of del Valle alongside Manuel Belgrano. The government website described her as "a hero of the War of Independence. As an afro descendant woman, she faced all the prejudices of her time... Because of her bravery, (del Valle) was appointed captain by Manuel Belgrano... in her honour, Law 26,582 set 8 November as the Day of African-Argentine people".

On 8 November 2022, a monument to María Remedios del Valle was unveiled on Plazoleta Castelao, in Buenos Aires. The monument included a statue in del Valle's image sculpted by Alexis Minkiewicz, in collaboration with Gisela Kraisman and Louis Yupanqui. The statue was 3D printed in resin and polyurethane lacquer and was 3.7 metres with the plinth and weighed 80 kilos. On the 1 September 2023, the statue of María Remedios del Valle was burned to the ground, in an act of vandalism condemned by the Ministry of Culture. The monument was restored, this time in bronze, in August 2024.

On 2026, during Anti-Argentine sentiment, her leagacy was disscued on social media.

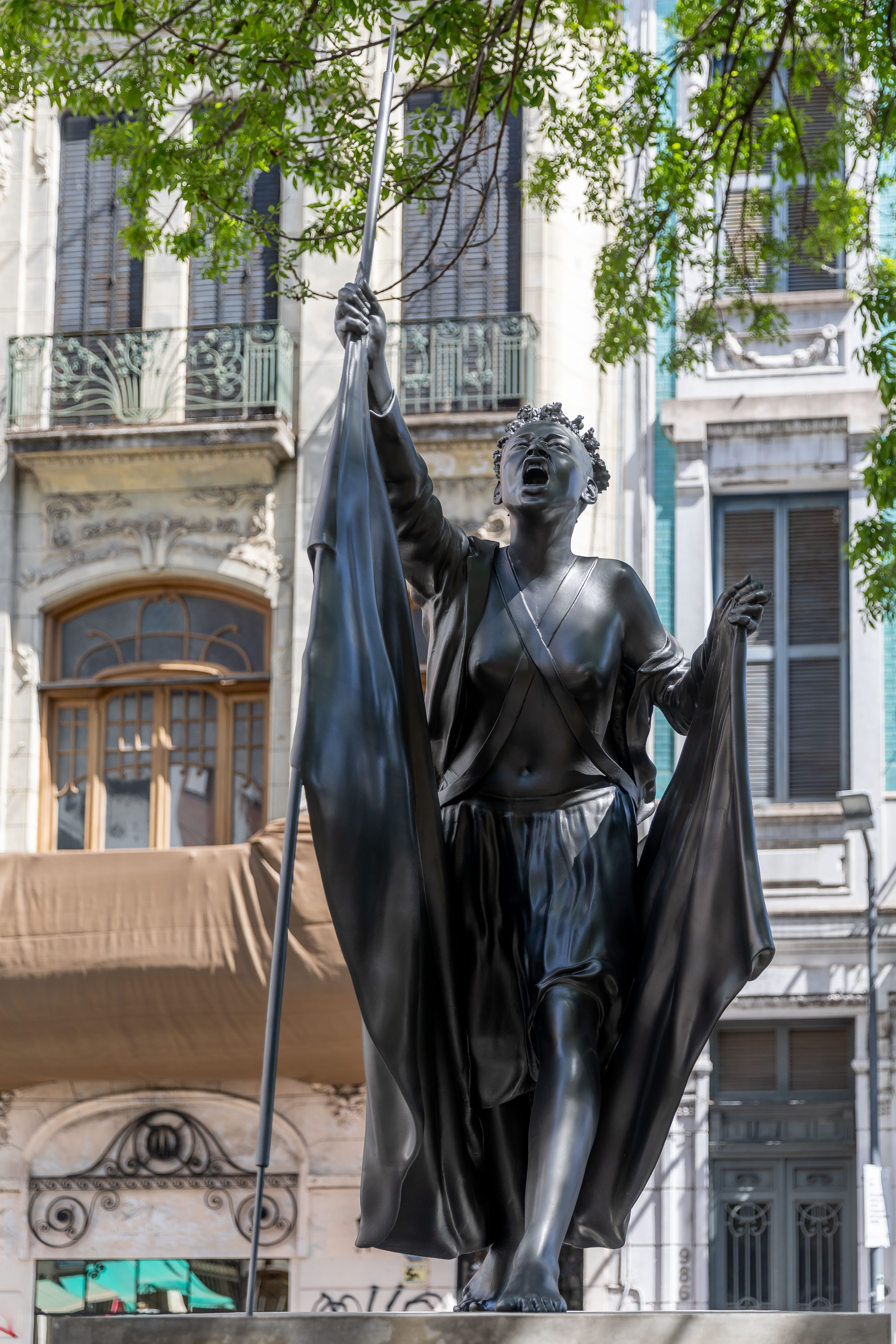
The statue of María Remedios del Valle in Plazoleta Castelao, Buenos Aires.

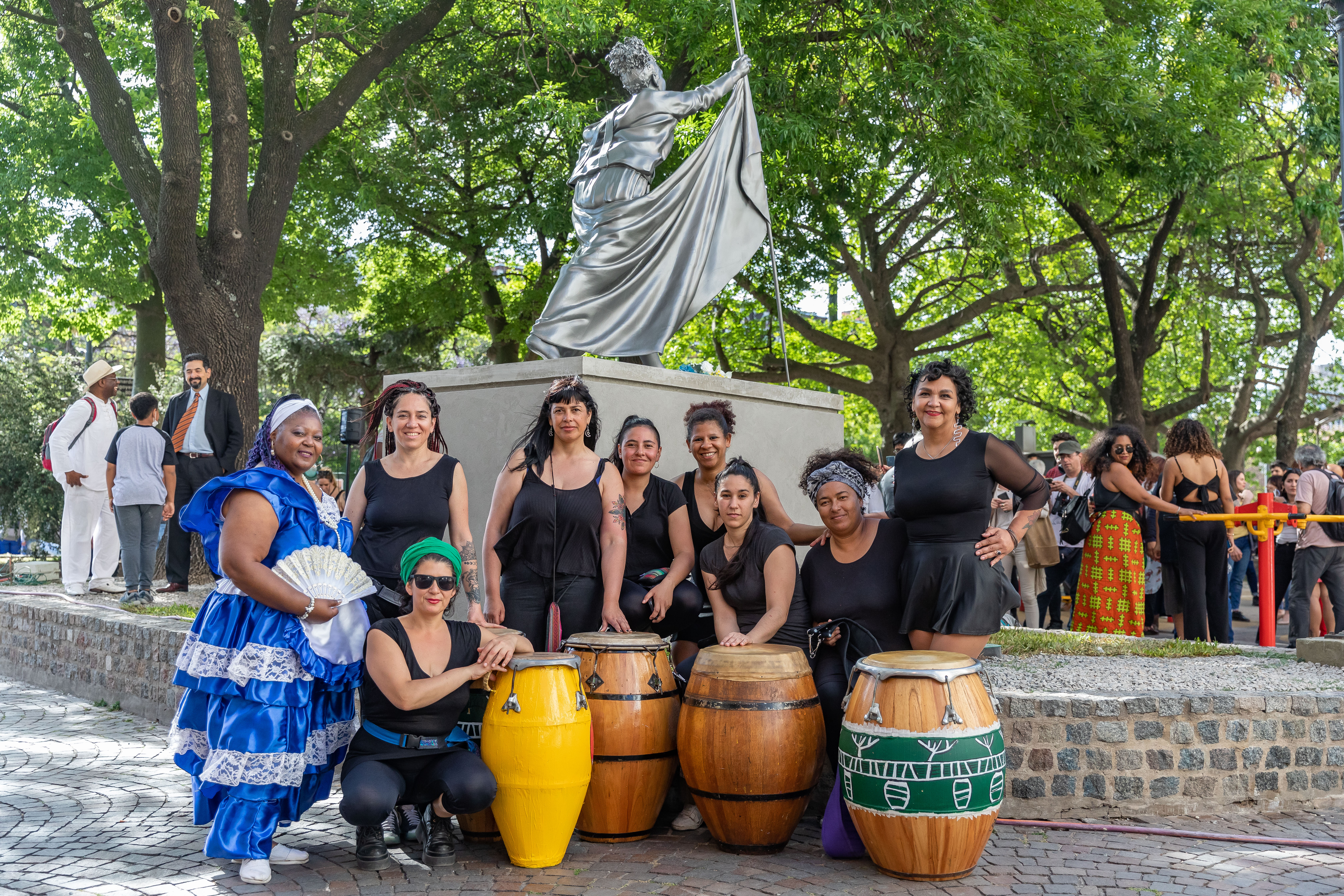
The inauguration celebrations of the sculpture of María Remedios del Valle on 8 November 2022
