= Flags from Macha =

Historical flag of Argentina

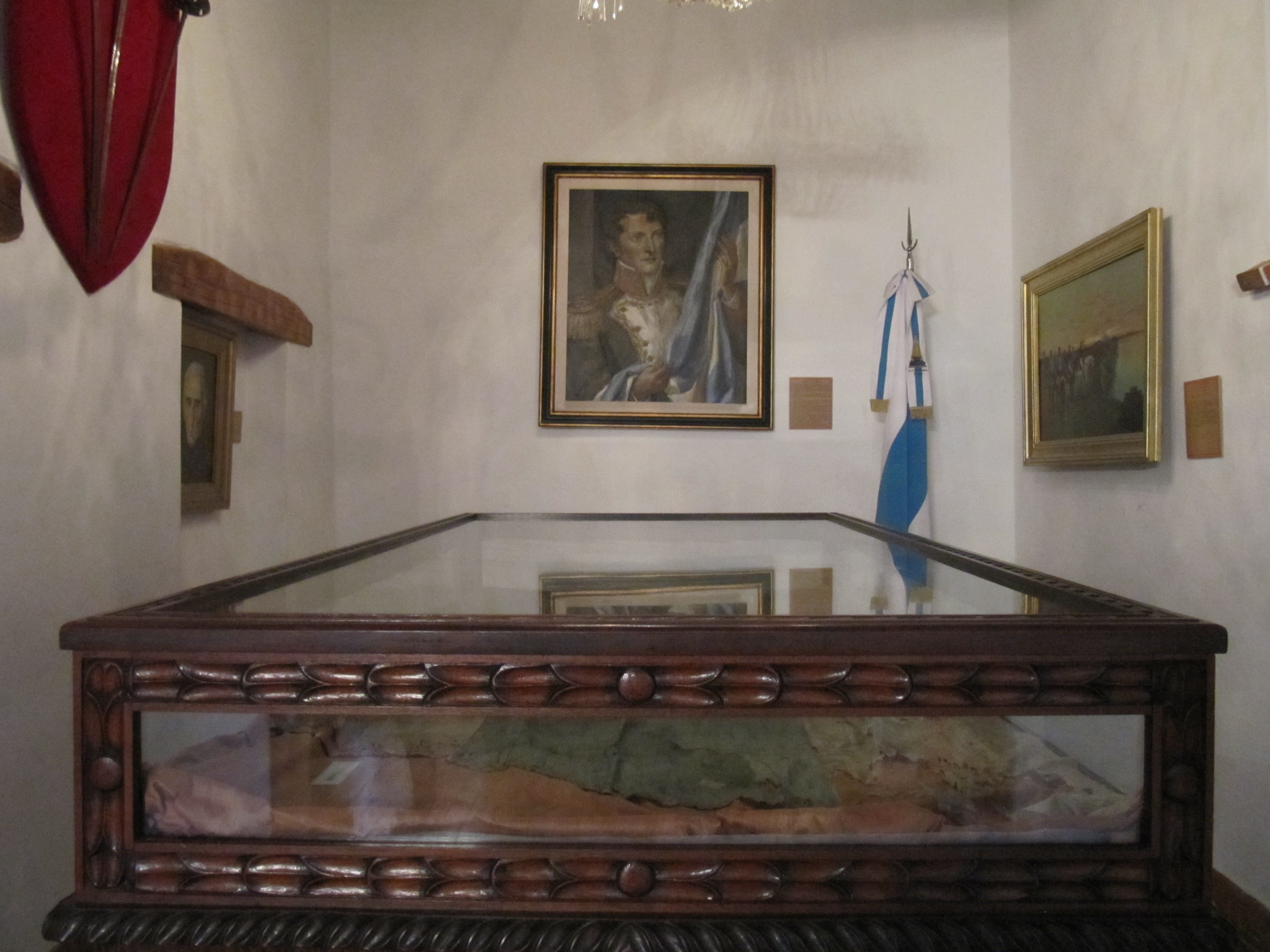
The flag from Macha kept in Sucre, Bolivia

The flags from Macha is the name given to a pair of flags of Argentina found at a chapel in the hamlet of Titiri, near the village of Macha, north of Potosí, Bolivia. They are considered to be the first physical flags created by Manuel Belgrano, who in November 1813 hid the standards to prevent them from falling into enemy hands after the United Provinces' army defeat of Ayohuma. They were discovered in 1885. Bolivia kept one of those flags at Sucre; the other was given to Argentina in 1896 and is currently kept at the National Historical Museum. Tucumán Province has used it as provincial flag since 2010. The flag preserved in Argentina is a triband of blue, white and blue bands, like the modern flag of Argentina, but the one kept in Bolivia is a triband of white, blue and white.

== History ==
The Flag of Argentina was created by Manuel Belgrano during the Argentine War of Independence. After concluding the Paraguay campaign, he moved to Rosario to build artilleries. While being in the village he noticed that both the royalist and patriotic forces were using the same colors, Spain's yellow and red. He requested to the First Triumvirate a new cockade, which was approved by a decree on February 18, 1812. The colours of this cockade were white and light blue. Encouraged by this success, he created a flag of the same colours nine days later. The flag was first flown, for the soldiers to swear allegiance to it, on 27 February 1812, on the Batería Libertad (Liberty Battery), by the Paraná River. Although it is known that this first flag had white and light blue colours, the design is unknown by historians, and could be either a blue-white-blue triband, or white-blue-white. Belgrano wrote a letter to the Triumvirate to inform it of the new flag, saying that "...being in need to raise a flag, and not having one, I made it to be done white and light blue according to the colours of the national cockade..."; which did not detail the actual design. Still uninformed of this, the Triumvirate dispatched Belgrano to Salta, to reinforce the Army of the North. This gave room to another unclear detail: whenever Belgrano left the physical flag in Rosario, or took it with him to the North.

Belgrano dispatched a letter addressed to the First Triumvirate, informing them of the newly created flag. However, unlike with the cockade, the Triumvirate did not accept the use of the flag: the international policy at the time was to state that the government was ruling on behalf of Ferdinand VII king of Spain captive of Napoleon, whereas the creation of a flag was a clear independentist act. Thus, the triumvirate sent a warning to Belgrano not to fight under the flag, but by the time the reply had arrived, Belgrano had moved to the north, following the previous orders that requested him to strengthen the patriotic position in the Upper Peru after the defeat of Juan José Castelli at the Battle of Huaqui. Still unaware about the Triumvirate's refusal, Belgrano raised the flag at San Salvador de Jujuy and had it blessed by the local church on the second anniversary of the May Revolution. Belgrano accepted the orders from the Triumvirate by time they arrived to Salta and ended using the flag. As soldiers had already made oaths to the new flag, Belgrano said that he was saving it for the circumstance of a great victory.

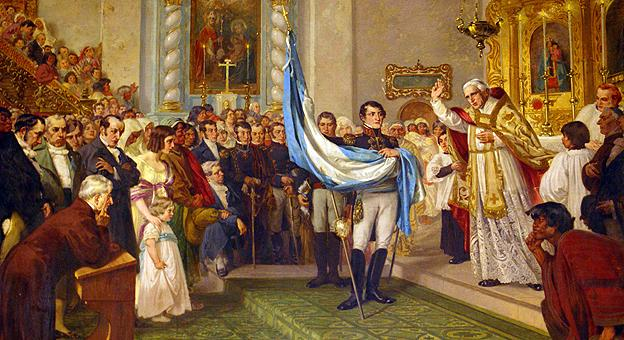
The priest Juan Ignacio Gorriti blessing the flag.

The First Triumvirate was later replaced by the Second Triumvirate, with a more liberal ideology, who called the Asamblea del Año XIII. This assembly authorized to use the flag as a War flag, but not as a national one. The first oath to the newly approved flag was on February 13, 1813, next to the Salado River, which is also known since then as "Río Juramento" ("Oath River"). The first battle fought with the approved flag was the Battle of Salta, a decisive patriotic victory that achieved the complete defeat of royalist Pío Tristán. The army moved to the north, but was defeated at the battles of Vilcapugio and Ayohuma. After those defeats, the army retreated to the south. Fearing that the enemy armies got the flags, he left them to the care of the parish priest of Macha, which hid them behind a Saint Teresa of Avila's portrait in a chapel near the small hamlet of Titiri (18°57′20″S 65°58′53.1″W). Belgrano was summoned back to Buenos Aires, and sent to Europe in diplomatic mission, and the flags were considered to be lost.

The flags were discovered many decades later, in 1885. The new priest was cleaning and restoring the chapel, and found them. The flags were moved to the "Museum of the Independence" in Sucre, which kept one of the flags. The other was delivered to Argentina in 1896, after a request from Argentine ambassador to Bolivia Adolfo Carranza. This last one is kept at the National Historical Museum, which works in restoring it.

== Preservation ==
The National Historical Museum started to restore the Flag in 2007, making a study of it. María Pía Tamborini and Patricia Lissa were in charge of the restoration.

The flag is made of silk, and only 70% of it remains. It was kept under bad conditions over the years, and the silk used was not of high quality. For this reason, the original colours could not be restored, which were indigo blue and ivory white.

The flag is kept inside a closed cabinet, at a room with low lights. It was made available to the view of the public in 2010, year of the Argentina Bicentennial.

== See also ==
- Flag of Argentina
- Manuel Belgrano

== Bibliography ==
- Torres, Eduardo Pérez (2010). Bandera de Macha: La Bandera de Belgrano (in Spanish). Salta: Hanne. ISBN 978-987-1264-34-6.
- Goman, Adolfo Mario (2007). Enigmas sobre las primeras banderas argentinas. Cuatro Vientos. ISBN 987-564-702-0 (in Spanish)
