= Flag of Tucumán =

- Flag from Macha
- Use: Civil and state flag
- Proportion: 9:14
- Adopted: April 13, 2010; 16 years ago
- Designed by: Manuel Belgrano

The flag of Tucumán Province, Argentina, is known as the flag from Macha. It consists of a light blue stripe between two white stripes at the top and bottom, which is a negative of the national flag. It was approved by the Provincial Legislature on 13 April 2010.

== Symbolism ==
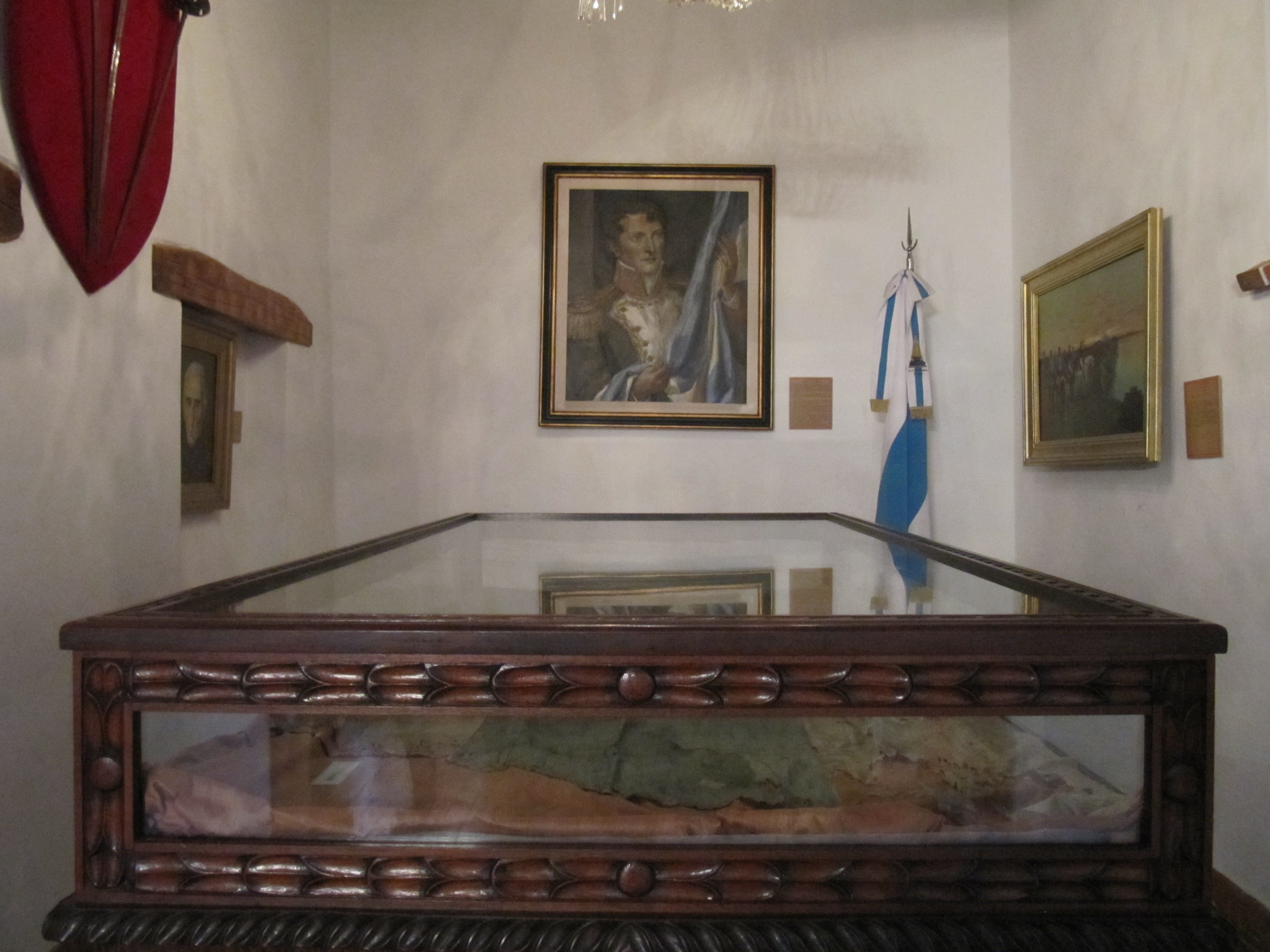
Belgrano flag displayed at the Casa de la Libertad in Sucre, Bolivia.

The flag currently used in Tucumán is identical to one of the flags used by Manuel Belgrano's troops during the Argentine War of Independence. Belgrano, who was also the initiator of the creation of the national flag, created its other variant while commanding the Army of the North. It is not known what role the flag with the reversed colors served.

Two Army of the North flags were hidden in the church in Santiago de Macha after the lost Battle of Ayohuma and were found on 16 October 1883. One of these flags was returned to Argentina in 1896, and the other, this one with the colors reversed, remains on display in Sucre, Bolivia.

== History ==
=== War of Independence ===
1812

1814

1814

The first historical mention of the Tucumán flag dates back to 1812, when the War of Independence was still ongoing. Fray Joaquín Masian, custodian of the Convent of St. Francis, noted in the archives that a new flag had been made for the school.

The school had placed a light blue and white taffeta flag with taffeta fringe and two ribbons more than four fingers wide, one white and the other light blue, hanging from a spear... paid for by the government through Thursday to walk around the square and other activities conducted at the government's request.

In 1814, the new governor Bernabé Aráoz approved the use of this flag.

=== Republic of Tucumán ===
1820–1821

After the Battle of Cepeda on 1 February 1820 the central government was dissolved. Amidst the anarchy, Aráoz declared the Republic of Tucumán, made up of Tucumán, Catamarca and Santiago del Estero. Aráoz was a member of the Federalist Party, so the party colours of navy blue and red were used. On 29 August 1821, Abraham González removed President Aráoz from power and ended the republic. The flag has been modified to reflect the proportions and shades of the national flag.

=== 1995-2008 ===
1995 (proposal)

1995-2008

In 1995, Alfredo Guido Linares, a member of parliament for the Republican Force (the party to which Antonio Bussi, who was elected governor shortly afterwards, also belonged), proposed a project inspired by the idea of Dr. Miguel Carrillo Bascary to restore the 1814 flag. A design was developed that reflects the current appearance of the national flag, i.e. the proportions of 5:8 and the light shade of blue stripes.

Ultimately, however, Bussi approved a different project, also presented by Linares. The resulting flag had an azure field with a white cross in the center. Next to the arms of the cross were written the dates 1812 and 1816, meaning the Battle of Tucumán and the Argentine Declaration of Independence respectively. Above the horizontal arms was a rising sun with ten visible alternating long and short rays. In the center, but below the horizontal arms, was the golden outline of a Historical House of Independence. On either side of it were two branches of laurel. In 1999, Bussi lost the elections, and the following Governors belonged to the Justicialist Party. The government of Julio Miranda stopped the practical use of this flag, but by repealing the previous law only on December 3, 2008. At that time, the flag was used by supporters of the Republican Force.

On 13 April 2010, when Tucumán was one of three provinces without its own flag, the use of the historic flag from Macha was approved as the new provincial flag.

== See also ==
- Flags from Macha
- List of Argentine flags
- White-blue-white flag

== Sources ==
- Cisneros, Andrés; Escudé, Carlos (2000). "La posición de Santiago del Estero". Historia General de las Relacines de la Republica Argentina.
