= Batallón de Pardos y Morenos =

- Disbanded: 1816
- Country: Argentina
- Allegiance: Spanish Empire - until 1810 (Argentina) United Provinces of the River Plate
- Branch: Argentine Army
- Type: Infantry
- Engagements: British invasions of the River Plate; Battle of Las Piedras; Battle of Tucumán; Battle of Salta; Battle of Vilcapugio; Battle of Ayohuma; Battle of Sipe-Sipe

Batallón de Pardos y Morenos was an Argentine military unit formed with soldiers of African and indigenous descent. The unit had its combat debut during the first British invasion of the River Plate. From 1810 onwards, this military unit was part of the patriot forces that fought against the Spanish in the War of Independence.

== History ==
The Batallón de Castas (Castes Battalion) was based on Compañía de Granaderos de Pardos Libres de Buenos Aires and Compañía de Granaderos de Morenos Libres de Buenos Aires. This unit was made up of former slaves, mostly of Angolan and Guinean roots, also including pardos and natives of Guaraní origin.

During the first British invasion of the River Plate, the battalion was under the command of Colonel José Ramón Baudrix, and consisted of two companies of grenadiers and seven companies of riflemen. The Casta battalion also had a slave corps, made up by four companies of slaves from Buenos Aires, which would be supplied with armaments during times of conflict.

From 1810 the Battalion was elevated to the rank of regiment, taking part of the Argentine forces during the First Upper Peru campaign. Later the regiment participated in the expedition to Paraguay led by Manuel Belgrano.

The Battalion also participated in the expeditions to the Banda Oriental del Uruguay, taken part in the Battle of Las Piedras. The Castas Regiment had an active participation of the Second and Third expedition to Upper Peru, integrating the ranks of the Army of the North, participated in the battles Tucumán, Salta, Vilcapugio, Ayohuma and Sipe-Sipe.

Among the patriots who were part of this military unit was Ramón Odocio, a lieutenant, who was a descendant of African slaves introduced into the Río de la Plata during the 18th century through the Asiento.

== Gallery ==
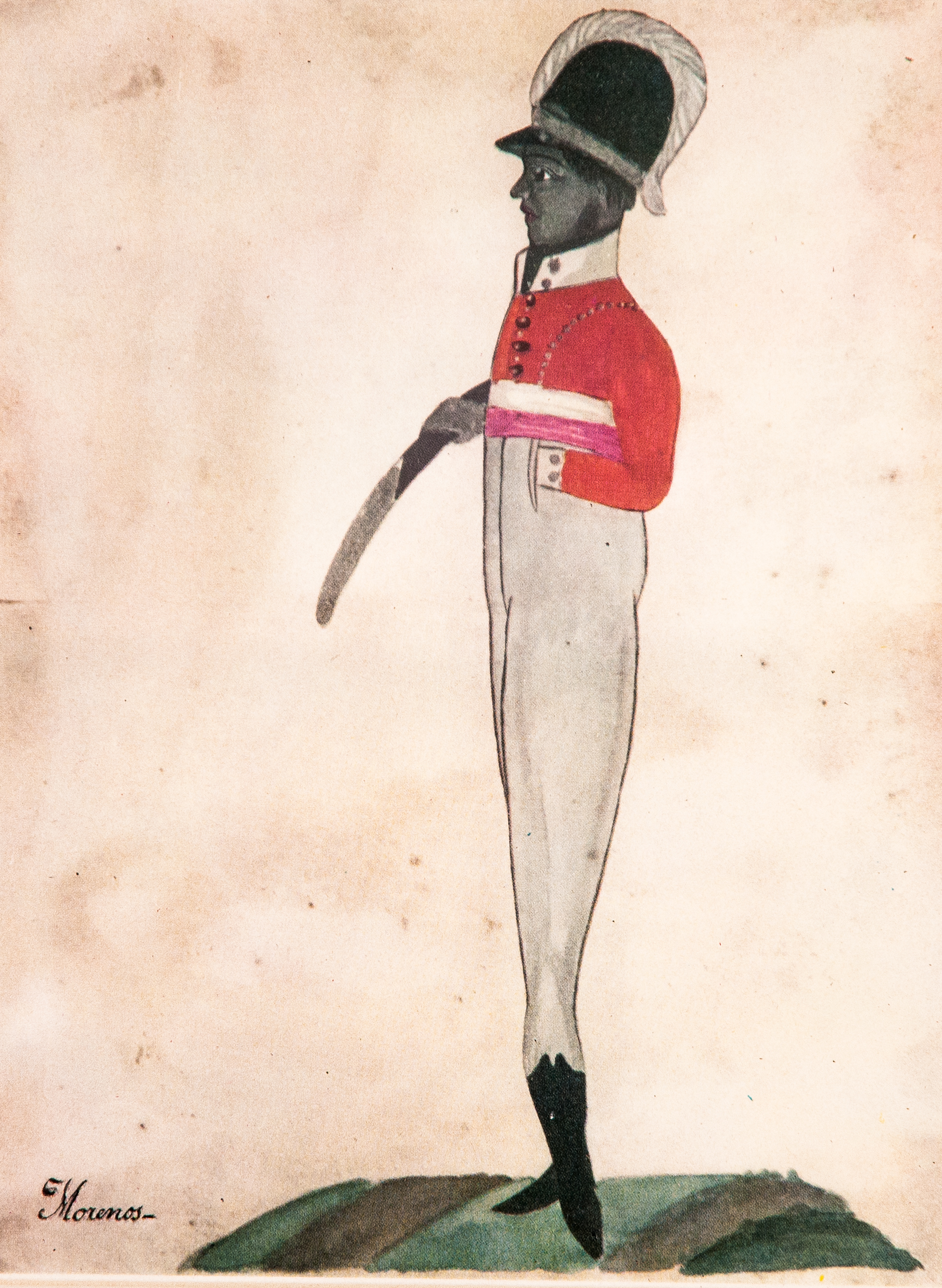
Soldiers of Morenos Battalion

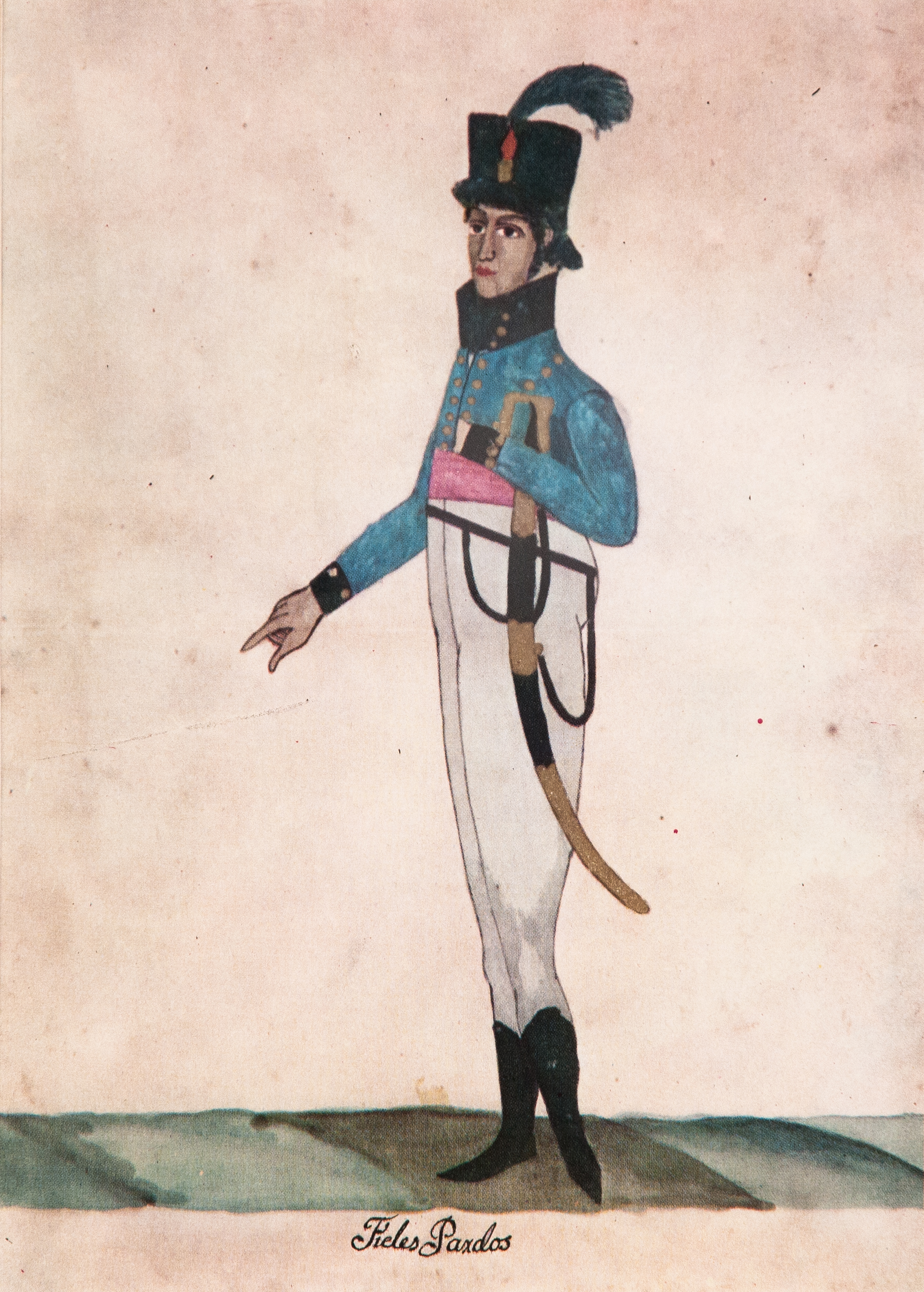
Soldier of Pardos Battalion

== See also ==
- United States Colored Troops
- Afro-Argentines
