= Action of Tambo Nuevo =

1813 action in Argentine War of Independence

- Part of Bolivian War of Independence; Argentine War of Independence
- Engraving of the action of Tambo Nuevo by Franz Van Riel
Date	23 to 25 October 1813
Location	Bolivia 19°10′31.1″S 65°53′56″W
Result	United Provinces victory

Belligerents
(Argentina) United Provinces; Republiquetas	(Spain) Viceroyalty of Peru

Commanders and leaders
(Argentina) Gregorio Aráoz de Lamadrid	(Spain) Saturnino Castro

Strength
12 cavalrymen	5 soldiers (Yocalla); 50 soldiers (Tambo Nuevo)

Casualties and losses
None	15 prisoners 2 prisoners executed
- Location within Bolivia Action of Tambo Nuevo (South America) Action of Tambo Nuevo (America)

The action of Tambo Nuevo, also known as Hazaña de los Tres Sargentos, was a successful cavalry raid carried out between 23 and 25 October 1813, during the second Upper Peru campaign of the Argentine War of Independence, by a small detachment of dragoons of the Army of the North. The targets were the headquarters of royalist Colonel Saturnino Castro at Yocalla, and later a forward outpost on Tambo Nuevo.

== Background ==
After the defeat of General Manuel Belgrano in the battle of Vilcapugio, on 1 October 1813, the bulk of the republican Army of the North withdrawn to the east, establishing its headquarters in the town of Macha. Belgrano hoped to reinforce his exhausted and demoralized troops with local draft and supplies. The royalist situation was no better, despite their recent victory. General Joaquin de la Pezuela lost more than 200 men in Vilcapugio, along with a good number of mules and horses, the main way of carrying artillery and other provisions through the rugged soil. A smaller fraction of Belgrano's army retreated to the city Potosí, under the command of General Díaz Vélez. By mid-October, Potosí was threaten from the north by a royalist squadron, led by Colonel Saturnino Castro, who seized the town of Yocalla.

== First raid ==
While honing his forces at Macha, Belgrano ordered several reconnaissance missions on the enemy. He chose one of his best cavalry officers, Lieutenant La Madrid, to collect intelligence about the royalist headquarters at Yocalla. La Madrid departed the republican camp with four dragoons and a native guide. After an icy-cold night, which ended in a heavy snowfall, the small detachment was just 400 metres away from the enemy stronghold. Not only their recce mission went unnoticed, but they also surprised a royalist patrol marching on the snow and took five prisoners. Only a troop of local natives, loyal to Pezuela, harassed La Madrid's group during their retreat along the defile of Tinguipaya, and informed Castro about his path through the mountains. When the captives were presented to Belgrano, he recognized two of them - a corporal and a soldier - as members of the royalist army defeated in Salta. These men had sworn not to turn their arms on the republicans again. To make an example, Belgrano had them executed by a shooting squad. Their bodies were later beheaded, and their heads, along with a reinforcement of eight dragoons, were sent to La Madrid, still close to the enemy.

== Tambo Nuevo ==
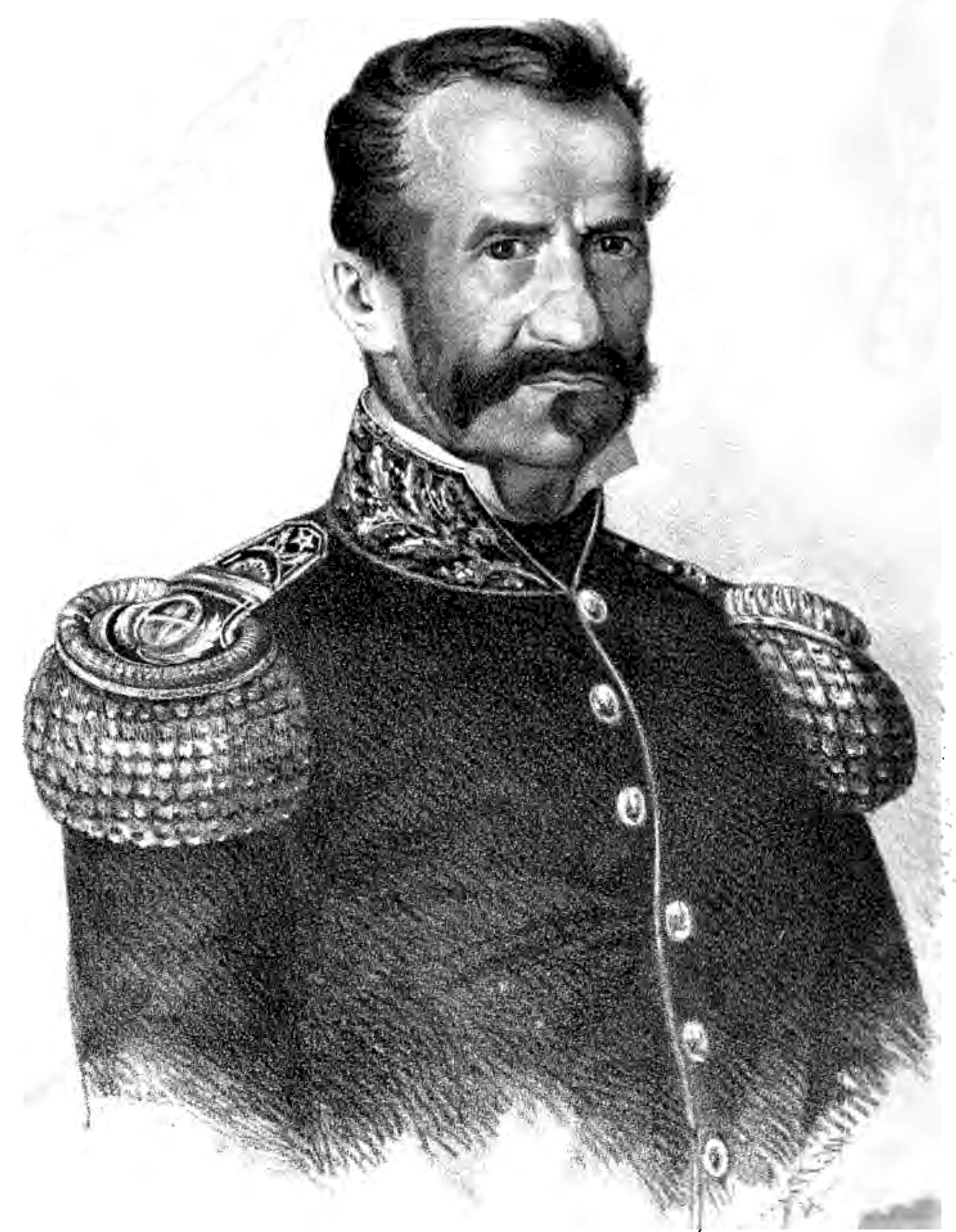
Gregorio Aráoz de la Madrid

La Madrid learned that Castro, aware of the route and movements of the Dragoons due to his local informers, had ordered a company to mount an ambush on the outpost of Tambo Nuevo, a mountain pass 25 km north of Yocalla. On the night of the 24th, La Madrid and his men climbed a hill behind the outpost. Three soldiers, acting as scouts, were the first to reach the enemy position. They found a stable of adobe sheltering at least 50 horses, and another building guarded by a sentry. After overpowering the surprised soldier, they broke into the building where they found another ten men sleeping. All of them were initially taken prisoners, but later a royalist sergeant managed to escape and gave the alarm. The rest of the company, suspecting that the republican forces outnumbered them, remained inside another building until dawn. There was a sporadic exchange of fire. At first light, La Madrid fell back to Macha with the ten captives. The three soldiers were promoted to sergeants by Belgrano, with the title of Sargentos de Tambo Nuevo.

== Aftermath ==
The small action had the unexpected effect of relieving Potosí. Indeed, Castro believed that his squadron was shadowed by a combined force of 200 men and withdrew to Condo, the headquarters of General Pezuela. This movement allowed General Díaz Vélez and his troops to join Belgrano's army in Macha. La Madrid cavalry reached the site of the battle of Vilcapugio, where he buried the corpses of several of his camarades fallen there. He chose this place to fix the severed heads of the prisoners executed by Belgrano in pikes. A banner was put on each pike with the writing por perjuros (for perjurers).

== See also ==
- Battle of Pequereque
- Battle of Vilcapugio
- Battle of Ayohuma
- Tres Sargentos
- Action of Juncalito
