= Ignacio Warnes =

Argentine soldier (1772–1816)

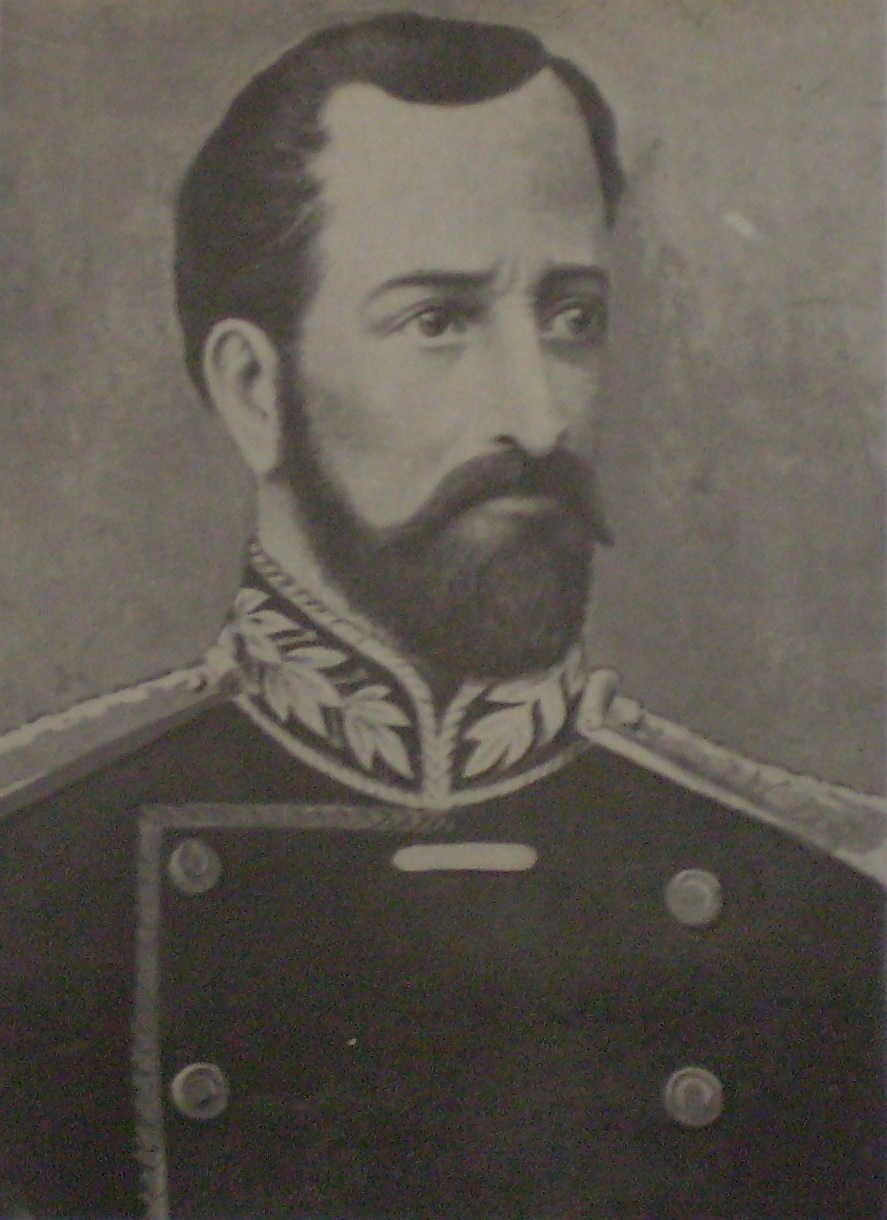
Ignacio Warnes

José Ignacio Warnes y García de Zúñiga (Buenos Aires, 1772 – Santa Cruz de la Sierra, 1816) was an Argentine soldier who fought in the Argentine War of Independence. Son of the mayor of the city of Buenos Aires Manuel Antonio Warnes y Durango and Ana Jacoba García de Zúñiga y Lizola. His sister Manuela married José Joaquín Prieto, president of Chile.

== Career ==
He enlisted in the Blandengues army regiment when very young. Between 1806 and 1807 he fought against the British invasions. In 1810 he supported the May Revolution, joining the revolutionary army with the rank of lieutenant. He was part of Manuel Belgrano's expedition, which fought the royalist army in Paraguay.

He was taken prisoner during the Paraguay campaign at Tacuarí, and was later released rejoining the forces that later would fight in the Army of the North campaigns under general Belgrano. Warnes distinguished himself at the battles of Tucumán and Salta, when the army attempted the liberation of Upper Peru (present-day Bolivia). He also fought with distinction in the defeats of Vilcapugio and Ayohuma.

== Santa Cruz de la Sierra ==
After these battles, Belgrano ordered him to command (1813) a troop to advance through the Gran Chaco to liberate Santa Cruz de la Sierra. Warnes was successful and assumed the government of the city. Theoretically he was bound to the authority of the province of Cochabamba, part of the United Provinces of the Río de la Plata, but in practice he worked with absolute independence.

He organized a local army, personally training the men and organizing local arms manufacture. While the rest of the army was retreating to Salta, Warnes maintained control of his province as military governor. He proved to be a brilliant military organizer. He created battalions of Pardos y Morenos (mulattoes), Coraceros (heavy infantry) and Cazadores (Hunters - light infantry). A little by his convictions and in order to recruit and fill the first of these battalions, he decreed the immediate release of slaves in the province.

He did not send help (nor asked) disregarding the insistent pleas from governor Arenales. Even though they disagreed, Arenales proved generous and marched his troops to help when Warnes was defeated by the royalist colonel Blanco at Angostura. Together they defeated the royalists at the battle of La Florida on 25 May 1814. During that battle, Arenales was seriously wounded when attacked by a small enemy party and left for dead, but he survived. Following that skirmish, when the battle was almost over, Warnes fought a sabre duel and killed the commander, colonel Blanco.

Reintegrated to the Army of the North, he contacted general Rondeau, offering him horses and cavalry troops, plus services of coordination and messengers. Rondeau, declined the offer and instead sent ex-governor of Córdoba Santiago Carrera to replace Warnes in the government of Santa Cruz. When Carrera arrived, Warnes' supporters revolted and killed Carrera and several of his party.

== Defeat and death ==
A few days later, when Rondeau was defeated at the Battle of Sipe Sipe, Warnes was again in charge of Santa Cruz "until when this army would return replenished...", as Rondeau told him. But the Army of the North never returned and Warnes was pressured by the royalist army ever more.

In September 1816, colonel Francisco Javier Aguilera, a Santa Cruz native defeated the rebel army at Santa Cruz. Warnes went to help with his 1,000 men and fought Aguilera at El Parí. The royalist cavalry was defeated and Aguilera lost half his men but Warnes was hit by a bullet and killed. Seeing their leader killed, led to a patriot defeat. The few survivors were taken prisoner and executed.

Aguilera entered the city with Warnes' head on a pike. Ignacio Warnes became a hero of Santa Cruz and today there is a city and a province in Bolivia that carry his name.

== Bibliography ==
- Bidondo, Emilio, La guerra de la independencia en el Alto Perú, Ed. Círculo Militar, Bs. As., 1979
- Mitre, Bartolomé, Historia de Belgrano y de la independencia argentina. Ed. Estrada, Bs. As., 1947
- O’Donell, Pacho, El grito sagrado, Ed. Sudamericana, Bs. As., 1997
- Pezuela, Joaquín, Memoria de gobierno, Escuela de Estudios Hispano-Americanos, Sevilla, 1947
