= Battle of Colonia del Sacramento =

The Battle of Colonia del Sacramento may refer to:

- Battle of Colonia del Sacramento (1807), between the British and Spanish Empires during the British invasions of the River Plate
- Battle of Colonia del Sacramento (1826), between the Empire of Brazil and the United Provinces of the River Plate during the Cisplatine War

== See also ==
- Uruguay
- Colonia del Sacramento
