= Battle of Pequereque =

1813 battle in Bolivia

- Part of Bolivian War of Independence; Argentine War of Independence
Date	19 June 1813
Location	Pequereque, Bolivia 18°49′51.16″S 66°40′57.68″W
Result	United Provinces victory

Belligerents
United Provinces; Republiquetas	Viceroyalty of Peru

Commanders and leaders
Cornelio Zelaya	Pedro A. Olañeta

Units involved
Army of Peru	Royal Army of Peru

Strength
135 cavalrymen	150–200 cavalrymen

Casualties and losses
3 dead 10 wounded	10 dead 20 wounded
- Location within Bolivia Battle of Pequereque (South America) Battle of Pequereque (America)

The Battle of Pequereque was a clash which took place on 19 June 1813, during the second Upper Peru campaign of the Argentine War of Independence, between scouting forces of the United Provinces Army of the North and the royalist Army of Peru. The republican cavalry of the Army of the North, led by Colonel Cornelio Zelaya, prevailed over the royalists, under the command of Colonel Pedro Olañeta.

== Background ==
After the capitulation of General Pio de Tristan in the battle of Salta, on 24 February 1813, the United Provinces' Army of the North gained the upper hand not only in northern Argentina, but also in southern Upper Peru (present-day Bolivia). At the same time, the royalists were experiencing a crisis of command, after the resignation of General José Manuel de Goyeneche for personal reasons. The Spanish garrisons reacted with panic after learning of Tristan's defeat and effected a massive withdrawal of their troops from Jujuy and Potosi towards Oruro, in central Upper Peru. During the early days of May the Army of the North reached Potosi, and a forward screen force of about 500 men was deployed along the route to Oruro. These troops, composed of a cavalry regiment of Dragoons, were commanded by Colonel Cornelio Zelaya.

== The action ==
The vanguard of the republican army advanced gradually from Potosi through the villages of Yocalla, Las Leñas, Tolapaca and Vilcapugio, before establishing their headquarters in the native hamlet of Ancacato, which had been partially destroyed by the royalists.

On 17 June, forced by the lack of supplies in Ancacato, a small detachment of Dragoons was sent to Challapata, some 12 km to the southwest, in search of food and other provisions. They were unaware that a royalist regiment of Cazadores, commanded by Colonel Pedro Olañeta, had captured Challapata shortly before. Two days after leaving Ancacato, the detachment was warned by a native that an enemy force was marching along the pass in the opposite direction. Zelaya immediately ordered the build-up of his forces in order to meet the royalists in a battle of encounter.

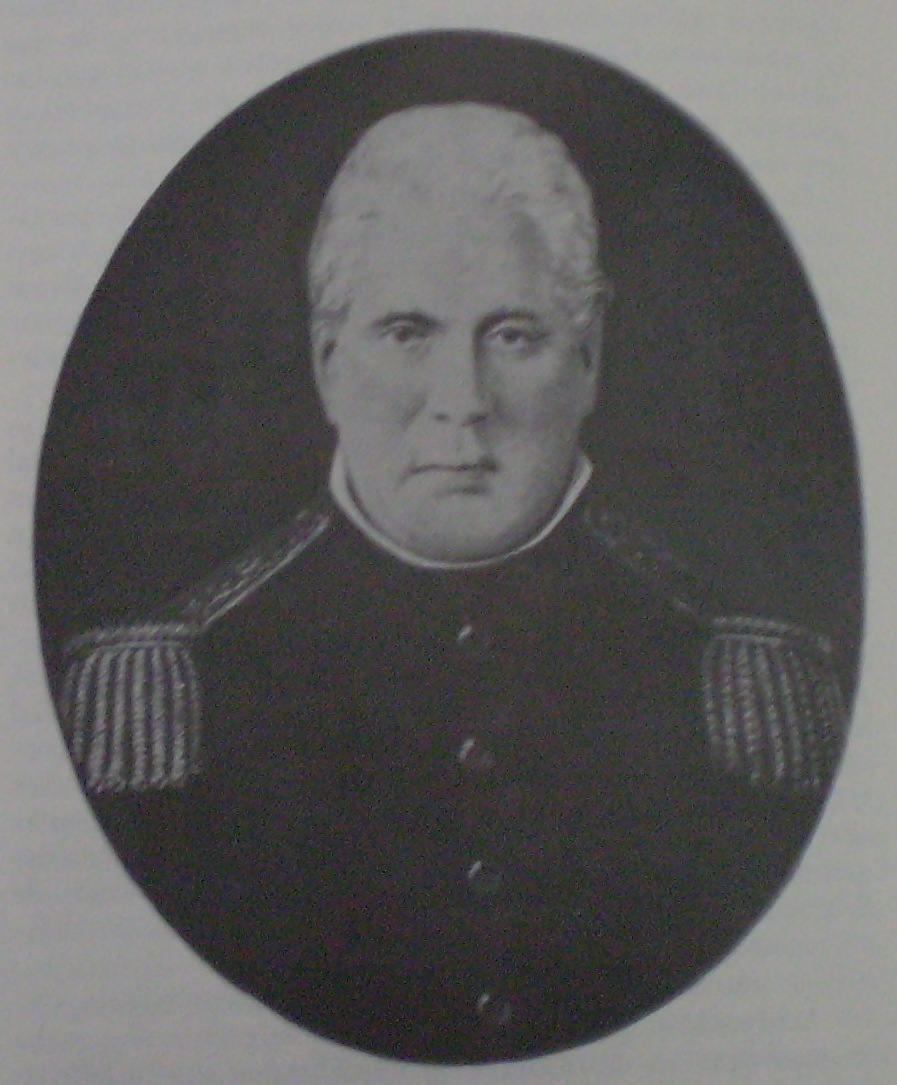
Colonel Cornelio Zelaya

Zelaya appointed one of his officers, Juan Francisco Zamudio, to lead a mounted company to face the advancing royalists, who had seized the small town of Pequereque, at the opposite end of the ravine. In the meantime, an infantry squadron was deployed in the rearguard along the pass, to prevent any hostile infiltration. The remainder of the regiment was also ordered to march on foot, to mislead the enemy about the real strength of the republicans. The engagement lasted for about five and a half hours, according to the official report sent to General Manuel Belgrano, commander in chief of the army. The royalists eventually gave up, leaving Pequereque in the hands of Zelaya and his men. Three soldiers were killed "...in cold blood after surrender", according to Zelaya's report, and 10 men were injured. He put Olañeta casualties at up to 10 dead and 20 wounded. Royalist sources seem to acknowledge that they suffered a number of casualties, without elaborating further. After holding Pequereque during a few hours, Zelaya decided to fall back to Ancacato.

== Aftermath ==
The troops of Olañeta took back Pequereque three days after the battle. The Dragoons retreated to the plain of Vilcapugio to avoid a further contact with the enemy, who by that time had gathered the bulk of their forces around Ancacato. Two days later Zelaya set his headquarters further south, at Las Leñas. Zelaya was later replaced by Colonel Juan Ramón Balcarce and sent by Belgrano to Cochabamba to recruit a bigger cavalry force from local volunteers. He would eventually join the main expeditionary force after the defeat of Vilcapugio.

== See also ==
- Battle of Vilcapugio
- Action of Tambo Nuevo
- Battle of Ayohuma
