= Martina Silva de Gurruchaga =

Argentine patriot (1790–1873)

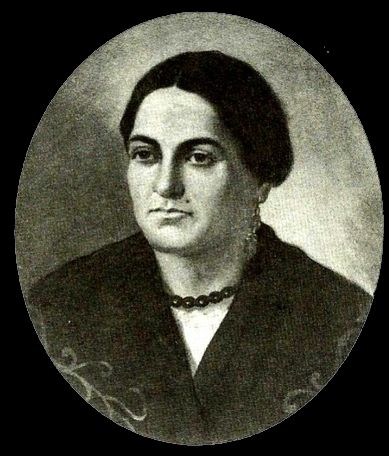
- Born: Martina Silva de Córdoba; November 3, 1790
- Died: March 5, 1873 (aged 82)
- Other names: Doña Martina Silva
- Occupation: Housewife
- Known for: Independence activism during the Argentine War of Independence

Martina Silva de Gurruchaga, also known as Doña Martina Silva, was an Argentine patriot. She was known for her actions before and during the Battle of Salta in which she earned the rank of captain.

== Biography ==
Gurruchaga (née Córdoba) was born on 3 November 1790 in Salta, then part of the Spanish Viceroyalty of the Río de la Plata. The daughter of a public official, she came from a relatively privileged background and would go on to marry a local merchant, with whom she would have six children. After the 1810 May Revolution and the subsequent outbreak of the Argentine War of Independence against Spain, Gurruchaga and her husband became strong supporters of the new Argentine government. Gurruchaga would invite pro-independence leaders to stay in her home, and organized the donation of cloth, money, and weapons for the Argentine army.

During the war, Gurruchaga's native town of Salta was occupied by a Spanish army. In 1813, an Argentine army led by Manuel Belgrano advanced towards the city, with intention of liberating it and defeating the Spanish garrison. In preparation for Belgrano's arrival, Gurruchaga armed a company of soldiers, gathered supplies, and sewed a blue and white battle flag. On the day of the Battle of Salta, she led her forces south and linked up with Belgrano, who was grateful for her assistance. The battle was a major victory for the United Provinces of Argentina, and out of gratitude for her actions, Belgrano granted Gurruchaga the ceremonial rank of captain.

Gurruchaga died on 5 March 1873, after which her remains were buried. In 1954, her ashes were re-interred in the Cathedral of Salta, becoming one of two women interred in the cathedral.
