= Jujuy Exodus =

Episode of the Argentine War of Independence

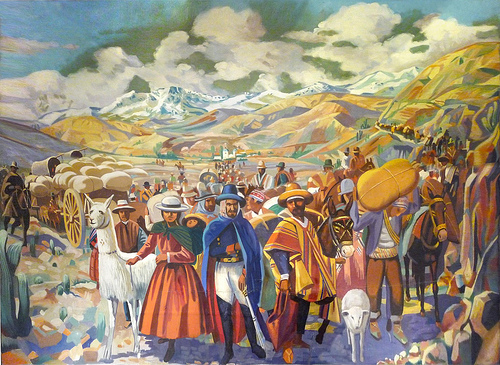
- Portrait of the Jujuy Exodus.
- Date: August 23, 1812
- Location: From San Salvador de Jujuy to Tucumán
- Participants: Population of San Salvador de Jujuy
- Outcome: Attrition of the Royalist army led to its defeat at the Battle of Salta.

The Jujuy Exodus (in Spanish, Éxodo Jujeño) was an episode of the Argentine War of Independence. It was a massive forced displacement of people from the Jujuy Province, by orders of General Manuel Belgrano, conducted by his patriot forces that were battling a Royalist army. The population was compelled to leave under the threat of execution.

== Development ==
During early 1812, Manuel Belgrano had created the cockade and Flag of Argentina near the city of Rosario, and then received order to move to the north. He would take command of the Army of the North, based in the city of San Salvador de Jujuy. The situation was not favourable: a short time before Juan José Castelli had led the First Upper Peru campaign and, despite an initial advantage and a brief time ruling the Upper Peru, faced a decisive defeat during the Battle of Huaqui. The surviving patriots and remains of the Army had retreated to the south, to Jujuy. They were lacking men, weapons and money, and had to stop a victorious army, better armed and four times bigger.

The loyalists, led by General Pío Tristán, were advancing south with 3,000 troops from today's Bolivia, into the northwest of Argentina (through Humahuaca). The revolutionaries were outnumbered 2 to 1, demoralized, badly armed, far from the assistance of the central government, and facing an outbreak of malaria without medication. In addition, many of the locals, especially of the higher classes, resented the arrival of forces from Buenos Aires and were ready to defect.

Belgrano, faced with the prospect of total defeat and territorial loss, ordered all people to pack their necessities, including food and furniture, and follow him, in carriages or on foot, together with whatever cattle and beasts of burden could endure the journey. The rest (houses, crops, food stocks, and also any objects made of iron) was to be burned, so as to deprive the loyalists of resources, following a strict scorched earth policy. On 29 July 1812 Belgrano asked the people of Jujuy to "show their heroism" and join the march of the army under his command "if, as you assure, you want to be free". The punishment for ignoring the order was execution and the destruction of the defector's properties. Belgrano labored to win the support of the populace, and later reported that most of the people had willingly followed him without the need of force.

The exodus started on 23 August and gathered people from Jujuy and Salta; people travelled south about 250 km, finally arriving at the banks of the Pasaje River, in the province of Tucumán, on the early hours of 29 August.

The Exodus is commemorated in Jujuy by traditionalist groups with an Evocative March, every 22 August since 1955. The Jujuy Province is declared honorific capital of Argentina each 23 August since 2002, by national law 25.644.

== See also ==
- Estadio 23 de Agosto
