= Action of Juncalito =

- Part of Chilean War of Independence
| Date | 10 March 1816 |
| Location | Uspallata Pass, Andes |
| Result | United Provinces victory |

Belligerents
| United Provinces | Chile |

The Action of Juncalito was a military engagement of the Chilean War of Independence, previous to the Crossing of the Andes campaign.

On March 10, 1816, nine months before the crossing of the Andes, José Félix Aldao led a group of Mounted Grenadiers to the Uspallata Pass. They had to find out whether the pass was secure or the Spanish Royalists had fortified it. They found a scout Royalist group, and managed to capture them without firing a single shot. They captured a sergeant, a corporal and 15 soldiers.

With this information, San Martín spread the news that the bulk of the army would cross to Chile by Uspallata. This was in order to deceive the Royalists in Chile, as they kept fortifying that zone, but the bulk of the Army of the Andes actually moved near the city of Mendoza.

== See also ==
- Action of Tambo Nuevo

== Bibliography ==
- Camogli, Pablo; Luciano de Privitellio (2005). Batallas por la Libertad. Buenos Aires: Aguilar. ISBN 987-04-0105-8.
