= Battle of Colonia del Sacramento (1807) =

- Part of the British invasions of the Río de la Plata
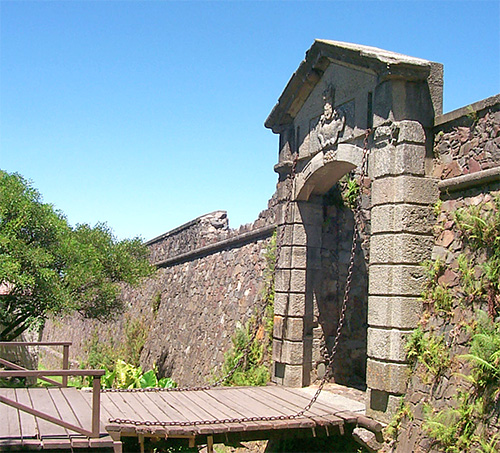
- Colonia del Sacramento fortress
Date	21/22 April 1807
Location	Colonia del sacramento, Banda Oriental, Spanish Empire 34°28′17″S 57°50′39″W
Result	British victory

Belligerents
Spain	(United Kingdom of Great Britain and Ireland) Britain

Commanders and leaders
Francisco Javier de Elio	(United Kingdom) Dennis Pack

Strength
1,500 militiamen	1,000 soldiers

Casualties and losses
8 dead 16 wounded	1 dead 3 wounded

The Battle of Colonia del Sacramento took place in the night of 21/22 April 1807, during the British invasions of the River Plate. A force of 1,500 militias led by Colonel Francisco Javier de Eíío was repelled by 1,000 British infantry and cavalry troops holding the fortress of Colonia del Sacramento and commanded by Colonel Dennis Pack.

== Background ==
After the conquest of Montevideo by the British expedition under the command of Lieutenant General John Whitelock on 3 February 1807, Rear-Admiral Charles Stirling dispatched the sloop HMS Pheasant to support the capture of the Spanish stronghold of Colonia del Sacramento, that was carried out on 16 March by infantrymen of the 2nd Battalion 95th Rifles without resistance. The commander of the fortress, Colonel Ramón del Pino, had evacuated his troops and artillery just a few hours before.

The commander of the Rifles, Colonel Dennis Pack, deployed groups of 200 or 300 men on several key points around the fortress and mounted chevauls de frise to improve the stronghold defenses. del Pino had meanwhile established his camp on the shores of Colla creek and sent local mounted guerrillas to harass British communications between Colonia and Montevideo.

== Expedition from Buenos Aires ==
Colonel Francisco Javier de Elío, the military commander of the Banda Oriental, managed to flee Montevideo and reached Buenos Aires, where he summoned the main Spanish officers to a war council which decided to gather 500 volunteers, most of them from the Patricios Regiment. de Elìo also received four cannons and two howitzers and funds up to $12000.

The expedition was eventually composed of 900 men under the supreme command of de Elío. The naval forces and the transport fleet would be led by Captain Juan Gutiérrez de la Concha and the artillery corps by Colonel Felipe Sentenach. Besides the Patricios, several militias joined de Elìo's, army, among them the Battalion of Pardos y Morenos, the Battalion of Arribeños and the tercio of Miñones of Catalonya. The fleet departed from Buenos Aires on 13 April, reaching Nueva Palmira (then Las Higueritas) on 16 April. The next day the expedition marched on foot to Calera de las Huèrfanas, where they mounted a camp. The army was reinforced by 600 Spanish stragglers from Montevideo.

== The battle ==
On 21 April, when the expedition reached Real San Carlos, de Elío learned that the British army had made a thrust to the northwest in the belief that incoming Spanish forces were approaching from that direction. de Elío, confident that the British garrison would be exhausted after a full day of march, ordered his troops to move to Colonia through the countryside at night, crossing ravines and reedbeds. The artillery train was left in Real San Carlos. The advance was, in the opinion of contemporary writers and historians like Domingo Matheu, Ignacio Nuñez, Bartolomé Mitre and Vicente Fidel López, unprofessional at best. No forward parties were sent to sweep the area, no previous reconnaissance was performed before the assault. To make things worse, a member of the Catalonian regiment accidentally discharged his rifle, putting the British on alert. Notwithstanding this incident, the Spanish infantry was able to overwhelm a British post, but no further progress was possible because the assaulting troops scattered into the settlement instead of concentrate their efforts on the enemy's positions. This manoeuver allowed a British company to attack the flanks and rout the main Spanish force. de Elìo withdrew to Real San Carlos to protect his artillery and ordered a general retreat to Calera de las Huèrfanas, 70 kilometres (43 mi) away. The Spanish expedition lost eight men and suffered 16 wounded, while one soldier from the British garrison was killed and two officers and a private injured.

== Aftermath ==
Colonel de Elìo was heavily criticized by his conduct of the action against Colonia. He was accused of mounting a reckless assault without previous knowledge of the terrain, giving the enemy more than enough time to react. After the withdrawal, de Elío established his headquarters at San Pedro, where the expeditionary army was once again attacked by the British and forced to retreat to Buenos Aires. There, they prepared for a last ditch defense.
