= Battle of Vilcapugio =

Battle fought in the Argentine War of Independence

- Part of Bolivian War of Independence; Argentine War of Independence
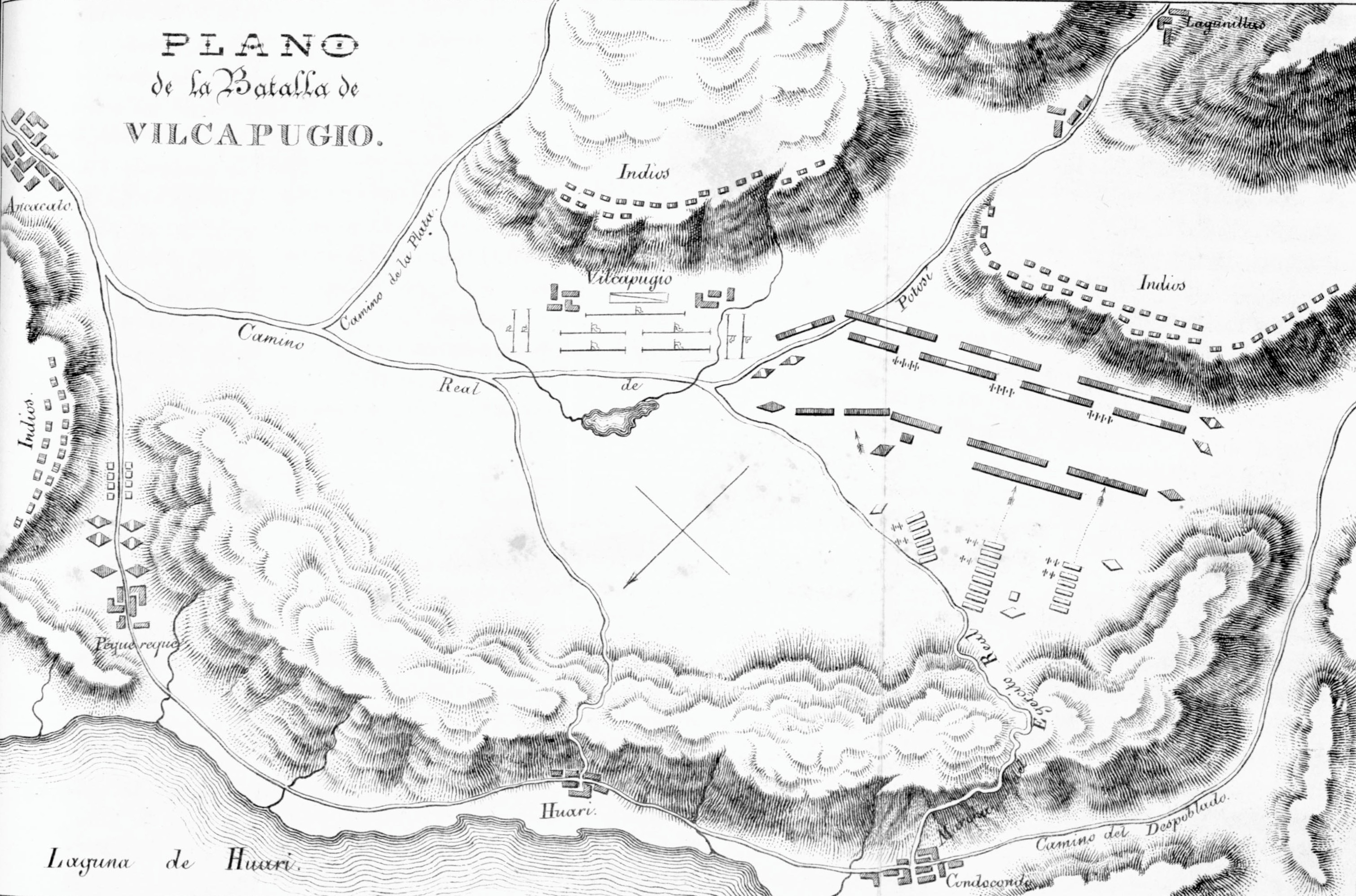
- Old map of the battle
| Date | 1 October 1813 |
| Location | Bolivia 19°2′19″S 66°33′31″W |
| Result | Royalist victory |

Belligerents
| United Provinces; Republiquetas | (Spain) Viceroyalty of Peru |

Commanders and leaders
| Manuel Belgrano | (Spain) Joaquín de la Pezuela |

Units involved
| (Argentina) Army of Peru | Royal Army of Peru |

Strength
| 3,400 soldiers 14 cannon | 3,500 soldiers 12 cannon |

Casualties and losses
| 350 dead | 200 dead |
- Location within Bolivia Battle of Vilcapugio (South America) Battle of Vilcapugio (America)

The Battle of Vilcapugio (Quechua: Sacred Well) was a major battle fought on October 1, 1813, during the second Campaign of Upper Peru in the Argentine War of Independence, where the United Provinces forces led by General Manuel Belgrano were defeated by a royalist army, led by Joaquin de la Pezuela.

== Second Upper Peru campaign ==
After the Army of the North's victories during the Battles of Tucumán and Salta, the campaign against the royalists in Upper Peru was restarted upon the insistence of the government in Buenos Aires. Despite being ill with malaria and having to command a company of new conscripts with insufficient artillery, Belgrano accepted the commanding post.

Belgrano's army was supported from Oruro province by Colonel Baltasar Cárdenas and the 2,000 poorly organized natives under his command, and Colonel Cornelio Zelaya with forces from Cochabamba. Both colonels had orders to raise the aboriginal populations against the Spanish authorities. Knowing that the royalist army did not have enough mules to move its artillery and provisions, Belgrano planned to use a pincer movement to attack, confidently believing that Pezuela's lack of mobility would be a decisive factor.

== The battle ==
At the end of September 1813, most of Belgrano's army arrived to the plain of Vilcapugio, a plateau surrounded by high mountains several miles north of Potosí. The royalist troops were encamped further west at Condo-Condo under the orders of Pazuela and Major Saturnino Castro, which allowed them to take by surprise and utterly defeat Cárdenas' native troops at Ancacato, 23 km north of Belgrano's headquarters. Castro also obtained documents from Cárdenas giving instructions to Belgrano. With these documents Pezuela was able to interrupt Belgrano's plans and began his advance on the mountains on 1 October, long before Zelaya's cavalry from Cochabamba could join the United Provinces army at Vilcapugio. Belgrano's army veterans from the North contained the left flank and center column of the royalist army and forced them to back down to the point that Pezuela had in mind, by a moment, to send a message to José Fernando Abascal, Viceroy of Peru, intimating that the battle had been lost. His own left flank, however, remained in action and defeated Belgrano's right column. Had the Northern army continued to persist in pursuing the Spanish troops, victory would have been secured, but the arrival of the royalist cavalry commanded by Saturnino Castro made the rebels panic, causing them to disperse. The royalist army reorganized itself and captured all of its artillery, continuously shelling the few soldiers left in Belgrano's encampment. As result of the battle, 350 rebels and some 200 royalists were killed.

== Aftermath ==
Belgrano and Eustaquio Díaz Vélez had decided that Vélez would march to the south to Potosí to reunite with the dispersed troops, while Belgrano would gathered the remains of his army near the town of Macha, some 65 km to the east.

Díaz Vélez took command over the troops in Potosí after Vilcapugio with the rest of the army on the left flank of the enemy. At this point the troops reorganized themselves to pursue the Campaign of Upper Peru according to the orders from the government of Buenos Aires.

== See also ==
- Battle of Pequereque
- Action of Tambo Nuevo
- Battle of Ayohuma
