= Joaquín de la Pezuela, 1st Marquess of Viluma =

Spanish military officer and viceroy

The Most Excellent The Marquess of Viluma
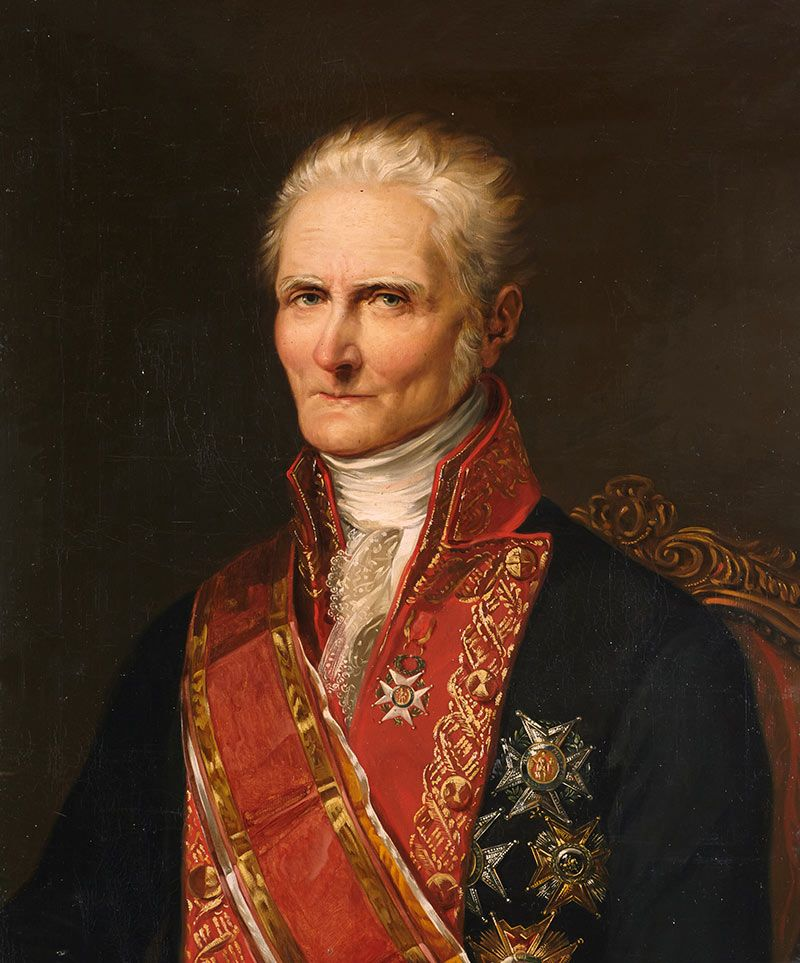
- Portrait as Captain general of New Castile, 1825

39th Viceroy of Peru
- In office July 7, 1816 – January 29, 1821
- Monarch: Ferdinand VII
- Preceded by: José Fernando de Abascal
- Succeeded by: José de la Serna

Personal details
- Born: May 21, 1761 Naval, Huesca, Spain
- Died: 1830 (aged 68–69) Madrid, Spain
- Profession: Military

Military service
- Allegiance: (Spain) Viceroyalty of Peru
- Rank: Lieutenant General
- Battles/wars: Spanish American wars of independence: Battle of Vilcapugio; Battle of Ayohuma; Battle of Sipe-Sipe

Joaquín González de la Pezuela Griñán y Sánchez de Aragón Muñoz de Velasco, 1st Marquess of Viluma, (May 21, 1761 – 1830) was a Spanish military officer and viceroy of Peru during the Peruvian War of Independence.

== Background ==
Pezuela was born into a hidalgo family originally from Santander. He attended the Artillery College in Segovia. In the army, he fought in the siege of Gibraltar, and later against the French in Guipúzcoa and Navarre, in 1793 and 1794. In 1805 he went to America as head of the army in Upper Peru (now Bolivia).

From there he went to Peru, when Viceroy José Fernando de Abascal y Sousa named him directory of the Royal Artillery. He reorganized the artillery, with emphasis on its modernization and technical aspects. In 1813 he was promoted to brigadier.

== Viceroy of Peru ==
A defender of the Spanish Crown in South America, Pezuela fought the insurgents. He defeated Manuel Belgrano on October 19, 1813, in the Battle of Vilcapugio and again on November 14, 1813, in the Battle of Ayohuma (in present-day Bolivia). After these victories he advanced to the south, occupying the cities of Jujuy (northern Argentina) on May 27, 1814, and Salta on July 25, 1814. However, he was forced to withdraw under continuing harassment by General Martín Miguel de Güemes's gauchos. He lost 1,200 men on the retreat back to Jujuy without having fought a single major battle.

In 1815 he fought José Rondeau, whom he defeated in the Battle of Sipe-Sipe or Viluma. This battle took place on November 29, 1815, near Cochabamba, Upper Peru. It is said to be one of the most serious defeats suffered by the insurgents in the Spanish American wars of independence. The insurgents lost 2,000 men and all their artillery.

For his success, in 1816 Pezuela was promoted to lieutenant general and given the title marqués de Viluma. By royal order dated October 15, 1815, he was named interim viceroy of Peru to replace Abascal. The following year he also became captain general of Peru.

In 1819 he was attacked in Callao by the squadron of Thomas Cochrane, and was forced to flee the port.

=== Coup and deposition ===
Relations between Viceroy de la Pezuela and his second in command, Lieutenant General José de la Serna deteriorated fast because De la Pezuela was an absolutist while de la Serna was a liberal. De la Serna finally asked to be relieved of command so that he could retire to Spain. Permission was received in May 1819, and in September, de la Serna resigned the command of the army to General José de Canterac. De la Serna had partisans in Lima, and upon his arrival there they demonstrated in favor of his remaining in Peru to face the threatened invasion of General José de San Martín from Chile. De la Pezuela agreed to promote de la Serna to lieutenant general and name him president of a council of war.

San Martin landed in Pisco, on September 8, 1820. De la Serna, through secret negotiations, was named commander-in-chief of the army gathered at Aznapuquio to protect the capital against San Martin's advance. He was ordered by the viceroy to march to Chancay. On January 29, 1821, the principal officers of the camp, partisans of de la Serna, petitioned Viceroy de la Pezuela to resign in favor of de la Serna. De la Pezuela refused and ordered de la Serna to subdue the mutiny, but de la Serna claimed to be unable to do so. The viceroy, seeing his authority evaporate, turned over the executive power on the evening of the same day. Later, the results of this coup were recognized by Spain.

== Later life ==
Pezuela returned to Spain in 1825, where he was captain general of New Castile. He died in Madrid in 1830. His eldest son was Manuel de la Pezuela, 2nd Marquess of Viluma, and his second son Juan de la Pezuela y Cevallos. His nephew was Manuel de la Pezuela y Lobo-Cabrilla, a conservative politician, who was minister of the navy and of commerce in the Spanish cabinet, and later a senator. As minister of the navy, he developed the concept of an ocean-going torpedo gunboat. As a result, naval officer Fernando Villaamil conceived the ocean going torpedo gunboat Destructor, built in 1885 in Britain and a precursor of the modern destroyers. He also approved the funds for Isaac Peral's project of an electric-powered submarine, the first of its kind.

== See also ==
- Mariano Osorio

Government offices
Preceded by José Fernando de Abascal	Viceroy of Peru; 1816–1821	Succeeded by José de la Serna
