= Battle of Ayohuma =

1813 battle in Spanish American Wars of Independence

- Part of Bolivian War of Independence; Argentine War of Independence; Spanish American Wars of Independence
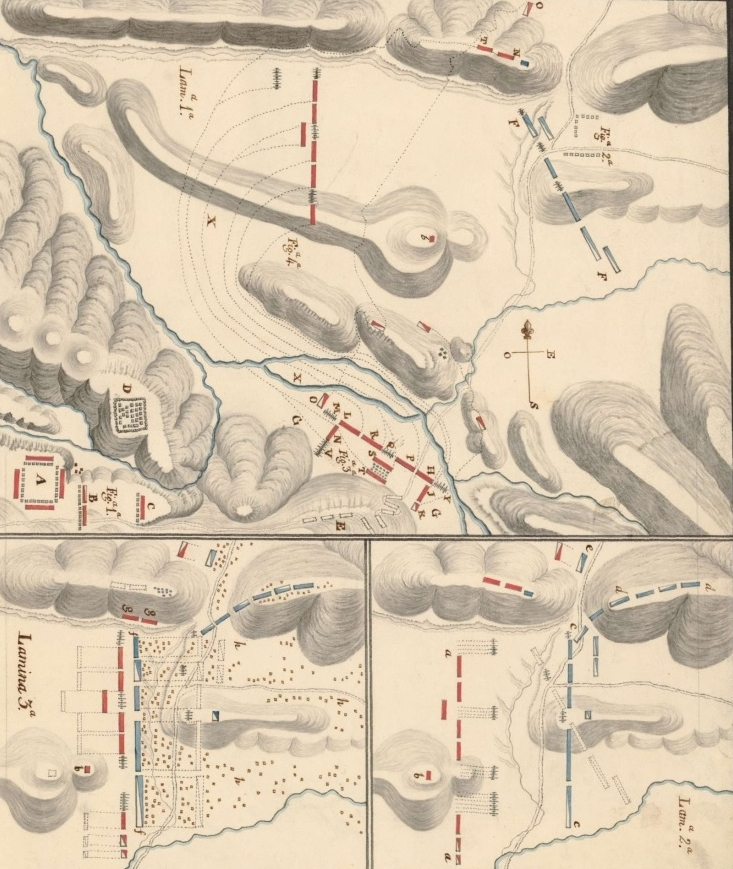
- Old map of the battle, drawn by first hand witness Francisco de Mendizábal
Date	14 November 1813
Location	Bolivia 18°51′19″S 66°7′36″W
Result	Royalist victory Withdrawal of the Army of the North towards Jujuy and Salta

Belligerents
United Provinces; Republiquetas	(Spain) Viceroyalty of Peru

Commanders and leaders
Manuel Belgrano	(Spain) Joaquín de la Pezuela

Units involved
(Argentina) Army of Peru	Royal Army of Peru

Strength
3,400 soldiers 8 cannon	3,500 soldiers 18 cannon

Casualties and losses
300 dead 200 wounded 600 prisoners	42 dead 96 wounded
- Location within Bolivia Battle of Ayohuma (South America) Battle of Ayohuma (America)

The Battle of Ayohuma ("dead man's head" in Quechua) was a military action fought on 14 November 1813 during the Spanish American wars of independence. The forces of the Royal Army of Viceroyalty of Peru, commanded by Spaniard General Joaquín de la Pezuela defeated the Army of the North, led by General Manuel Belgrano in their second Upper Peru Campaign of the Argentine War of Independence.

== Background ==
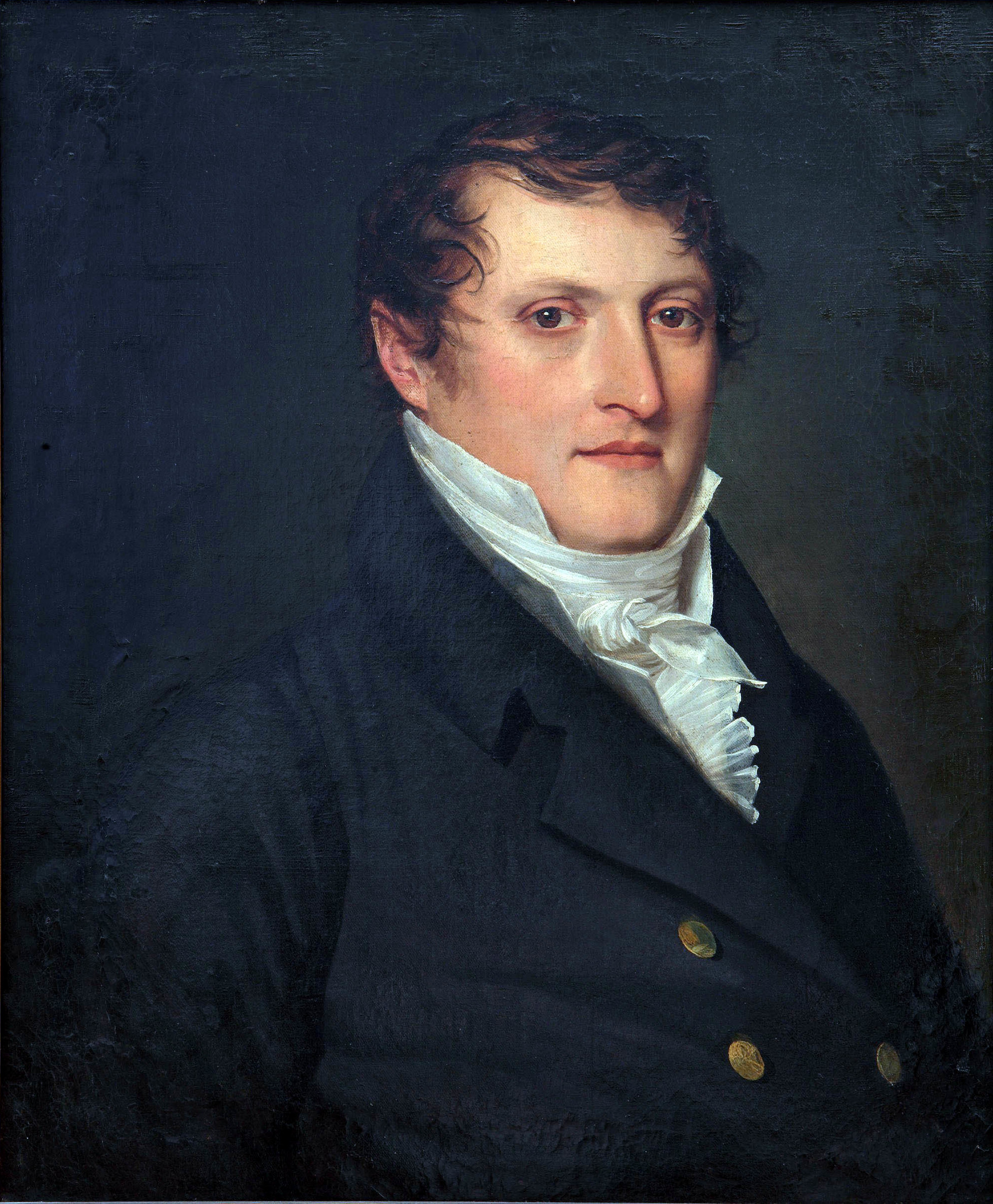
Leader of the Independentist Army of the North, General Manuel Belgrano

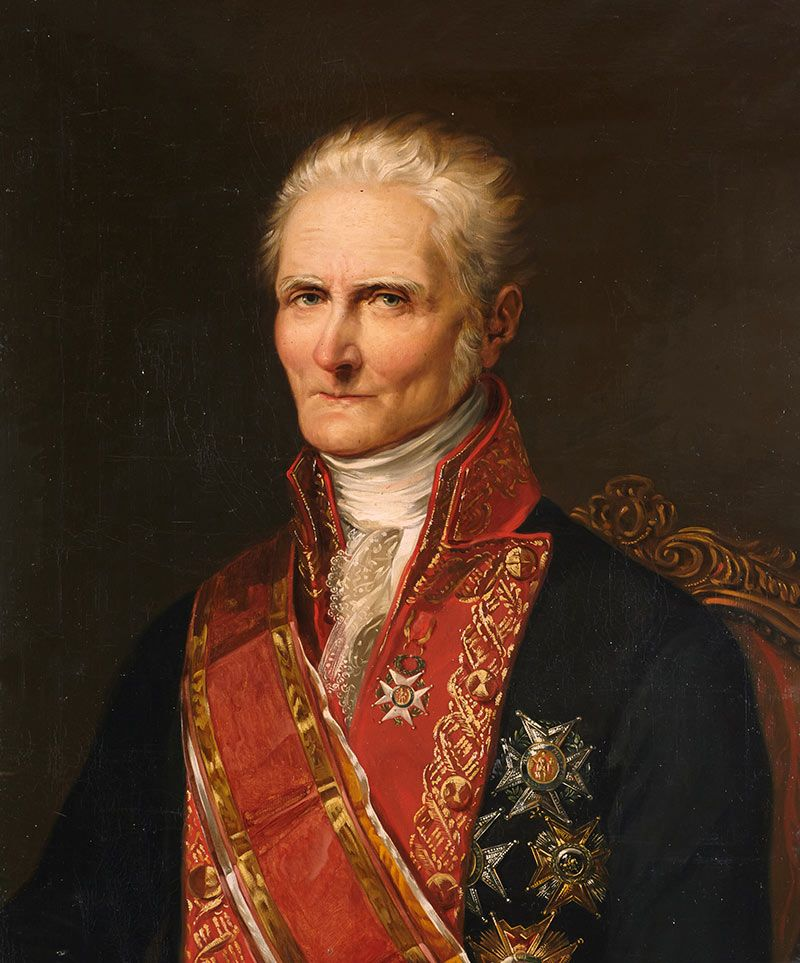
Leader of the victorious royalist forces, Spaniard General Joaquín de la Pezuela

After the rout of the United Provinces' army at Vilcapugio on 1 October 1813, Belgrano established his headquarters at Santiago de Macha. There he reorganized his forces, obtaining help from Francisco Ocampo (then President of Charcas), and from other provinces of Upper Peru (Cochabamba, Santa Cruz de la Sierra, and Chayanta). At the end of October 1813, the Army of the North included around 3,400 men, of which barely 1,000 were veterans, the rest being recruits or men drafted from the native population after the initial defeat. An important fraction of the patriot army, under the command of General Díaz Vélez had remained isolated at Potosí in the aftermath of Vilcapugio, but was able to reunite with Belgrano after a small action at Tambo Nuevo relieved them from the pressure of the royalist army.

Despite their recent victory, Pezuela's troops were short of horses, mules and supplies. They had sought refuge on the Condo-Condo heights, where, being surrounded by hostile populations and still recovering from the casualties suffered at Vilcapugio, they could not readily take the offensive against the Army of the North. However, on 29 October, Pezuela's army left their camp in Condo-Condo in order to attack the patriots before they could obtain further reinforcements. On 12 November, they arrived at Toquirí, a mountain dominating the small plain of Ayohuma, half a league from the village of the same name.

In the meantime, at his headquarters just two leagues away from Toquirí, on 8 November, Belgrano had discussed his plans with his officials. The majority of them wanted to withdraw to Potosí, but the general convinced his officers to fight. That night the army left Macha, reaching Ayohuma during the next morning.

== Battle ==
The armies that were about to face each other exhibited a significant disproportion. While Belgrano's cavalry outnumbered the royalists' two-to-one, Pezuela had twice as much infantry and 18 pieces of artillery, against only eight short-range guns carried by Belgrano's troops.

At dawn of 14 November the royalists began their descent from their high position and by mid-morning they had deployed the core of their forces on the plain. Belgrano's troops were meanwhile attending Mass, even if aware of the enemy movements. Some officers suggested to Belgrano an early cavalry assault on the enemy troops as these were still negotiating the steep terrain of the mountain slope, but the general opted for a head-on action on the plain. An hour later, Pezuela had completed his maneuver; instead of pushing a frontal assault, the royalist army outflanked the patriots on their right, crossing a range of hills that hidden them from their enemy and forcing Belgrano to hastily redeploy his troops in that direction. In the opinion of then Lieutenant Gregorio Aráoz de Lamadrid, one of Belgrano's best officers, this move proved decisive for the outcome of the battle. Then, Pezuela's artillery opened fire, blasting holes in the patriot ranks. In a hail of enemy fire, Belgrano ordered the advance of his infantry and cavalry toward the enemy right flank, but they could not overcome both the rugged terrain and Pezuela's entrenchments. To make matters worse, Belgrano' light guns were no match for the royalist artillery. Belgrano was forced to retreat. By a trumpet call and waving the United Provinces flag on the top of a hill, he managed to gather some 500 men, leaving around 300 dead, 200 injured, 600 prisoners and almost all his guns on the battlefield. The battle lasted seven hours.

Among the dead was the commander of the Batallón de Castas ("Castes' Battalion"), Colonel José Superí, who was killed by the royalist artillery. His battalion was made of soldiers of African and mulatto descent. José María Paz, an officer who would later play a key role in the Argentine Civil Wars, had to rescue his brother, Captain Julián Paz, when the latter's horse was killed by gunfire while crossing a stream. Colonel Cornelio Zelaya, one of the best cavalry officers in the Army of the North, along with a few horsemen under his command, fought a rearguard action that allowed the orderly withdrawal of the bulk of Belgrano's forces. Three mulatto auxiliary women, María Remedios del Valle and her two daughters, became famous for their efforts to provide water to the troops and assist wounded soldiers on the battlefield in spite of the heavy royalist bombardment, and they are since remembered as the Niñas de Ayohuma ("Maidens of Ayohuma") in Argentina.

== Aftermath ==
Belgrano's 500 survivors retreated to Potosí, but the city had to be quickly evacuated on 18 November due to the approaching royalist forces. Belgrano moved back to Tucumán, where on 30 January 1814, he resigned the command of the Northern Army to General San Martín. He would later write about the tactical superiority of the Spaniard officers as compared to his limited knowledge of warfare.

== See also ==
- Battle of Pequereque
- Battle of Vilcapugio
- Action of Tambo Nuevo
- Flag of Macha

== External links and references ==
- García Camba, Andrés (1846). Memorias para la Historia de las armas españolas en el Perú. Sociedad tipográfica de Hortelano y compañia, V. I. (in Spanish)
- Goman, Adolfo Mario (2007). Enigmas sobre las primeras banderas argentinas. Cuatro Vientos. ISBN 987-564-702-0 (in Spanish)
- Paz, José María (1855). Memorias postumas (in Spanish). la Revista.
