= Santiago de Macha =

Coordinates: 18°49′2.75″S 66°2′14.50″W

Santiago de Macha or Macha is a Bolivian locality in the department of Potosí, Chayanta Province, Colquechaca Municipality, Macha Canton. Macha had a population of 1,850 in 2001 and the canton was inhabited by 8,769 people. Most of the young adults works abroad, and the marketplace of the village opens only on Sunday. The main economic activity of Macha is subsistence agriculture.

Every 3 May, Santiago de Macha hosts the religious festival of Tinku, an aymará ritual consisting in a fist fighting challenge between two rival groups.

Rebel leader Túpac Katari was born in Macha in 1750. Between October and November 1813 the town was the headquarters of the Army of the North, commanded by General Manuel Belgrano during the war of independence against the Spanish rule.

== Climate ==
Climate data for Santiago de Macha, elevation 3,480 m (11,420 ft), (1983–2002)
Month	Jan	Feb	Mar	Apr	May	Jun	Jul	Aug	Sep	Oct	Nov	Dec	Year
Record high °C (°F)	29.5 (85.1)	29.9 (85.8)	31.0 (87.8)	30.5 (86.9)	29.0 (84.2)	26.3 (79.3)	25.0 (77.0)	27.0 (80.6)	30.0 (86.0)	31.4 (88.5)	30.0 (86.0)	29.9 (85.8)	31.4 (88.5)
Mean daily maximum °C (°F)	19.7 (67.5)	19.5 (67.1)	20.5 (68.9)	21.6 (70.9)	20.6 (69.1)	19.2 (66.6)	19.5 (67.1)	20.3 (68.5)	21.4 (70.5)	21.7 (71.1)	21.0 (69.8)	19.6 (67.3)	20.4 (68.7)
Daily mean °C (°F)	13.4 (56.1)	12.8 (55.0)	13.0 (55.4)	12.6 (54.7)	10.1 (50.2)	8.7 (47.7)	8.4 (47.1)	10.0 (50.0)	11.8 (53.2)	13.2 (55.8)	13.4 (56.1)	13.6 (56.5)	11.8 (53.2)
Mean daily minimum °C (°F)	7.1 (44.8)	6.0 (42.8)	5.4 (41.7)	3.4 (38.1)	−0.5 (31.1)	−2.0 (28.4)	−2.7 (27.1)	−0.2 (31.6)	2.1 (35.8)	4.6 (40.3)	5.8 (42.4)	6.6 (43.9)	3.0 (37.3)
Record low °C (°F)	−1.1 (30.0)	−2.1 (28.2)	−1.7 (28.9)	−7.0 (19.4)	−9.5 (14.9)	−10.0 (14.0)	−11.5 (11.3)	−8.5 (16.7)	−7.0 (19.4)	−6.0 (21.2)	−2.9 (26.8)	0.0 (32.0)	−11.5 (11.3)
Average precipitation mm (inches)	104.6 (4.12)	68.2 (2.69)	59.9 (2.36)	17.5 (0.69)	2.4 (0.09)	1.8 (0.07)	1.4 (0.06)	5.0 (0.20)	13.2 (0.52)	25.6 (1.01)	47.2 (1.86)	63.1 (2.48)	409.9 (16.15)
Average precipitation days	18.7	13.8	12.8	4.8	0.9	0.6	0.2	1.5	2.8	4.8	8.3	12.4	81.6
Source: Servicio Nacional de Meteorología e Hidrología de Bolivia
