= Battle of Salta =

1813 battle of the Argentine War of Independence

- Part of the Argentine War of Independence
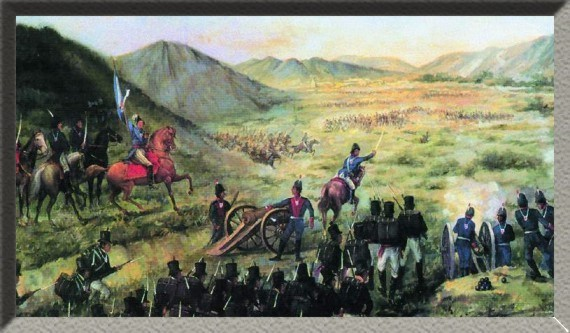
- Battle of Salta
Date	February 20, 1813
Location	Salta, Salta Province, Argentina 24°43′53.01″S 65°23′46.08″W
Result	Decisive United Provinces victory

Belligerents
United Provinces	(Spain) Viceroyalty of Peru

Commanders and leaders
Manuel Belgrano	(Spain) Pío de Tristán (surrendered)

Units involved
(Argentina) Army of Peru	Royal Army of Peru

Strength
3,000 soldiers 12 cannons	3,400 soldiers 10 cannons

Casualties and losses
103 dead 433 injured	481 dead 114 injured 2,776 prisoners 10 cannons 2,118 muskets
- Location within Argentina Battle of Salta (South America) Battle of Salta (America)

The Battle of Salta took place on February 20, 1813, on the plains of Castañares, north of the present-day Argentine city of Salta, during the Argentine War of Independence. The Army of the North, under the command of general Manuel Belgrano, defeated for the second time the royalist troops of general Pío de Tristán, after their victory in the previous September at the Battle of Tucumán. The unconditional surrender of the royalist troops ensured Argentine control over most of the northern territories of the former Viceroyalty of the Río de la Plata.

== Background ==
Belgrano had taken advantage of the victory at Tucumán to reinforce his army. In four months he improved the discipline of his troops, improved training and recruited sufficient men so as to duplicate their numbers. The artillery abandoned by Tristán in the previous battle helped Belgrano to fill his lack of equipment. At the beginning of January, he started a slow march towards Salta. On February 11, on the banks of the Juramento River, the army swore an oath of loyalty to the Assembly of the Year XIII which had started sessions in Buenos Aires a few days before, and to the national flag.

Tristán, in the meantime, had taken the time to fortify Portezuelo pass, the only access to the city through the hills from the southeast, a tactical advantage that supposedly would make the attempt impossible, except for the local area knowledge that the new conscripts brought to the rebels. Captain Apolinario Saravia, a local from Salta, offered to guide the army through a high path that led to Chachapoyas, which would allow them to connect with the north road that went to Jujuy, in an area where there were no similar fortifications. Under cover of rain the rebel army made a slow march through the rough terrain, hindered by the difficulty off moving equipment and artillery. On February 18 they reached a field where they encamped, while the captain, disguised as a native wrangler guided a mule train loaded with firewood to the city, with the intention of reconnoitering the positions taken by Tristán's army. A company of volunteers led by a local noblewoman, Martina Silva de Gurruchaga, also arrived to support Belgrano.

== Battle ==
On the 19th thanks to the intelligence from Saravia, the army marched on the morning with the intention of attacking the enemy troops the next morning at dawn. Tristán received news of the advance, and placed his troops to resist, placing a column of fusiliers on the side of San Bernardo hill, reinforced his left flank, and placed the 10 artillery pieces he had. On the morning of February 20 he ordered a march in formation, with the infantry on the center, one column of cavalry on each flank and a strong reserve led by Martín Dorrego. The first encounter went for the defenders, as the left-flank cavalry had difficulties reaching the enemy shooters due to the highly steeped terrain. Before noon Belgrano ordered an attack by the reserves on those positions, while the artillery used grapeshot on the enemy. Dorrego, at the head of the cavalry led an advance towards the fence that surrounded the city. The tactic was successful; columns of infantry under the command of Carlos Forest, Francisco Pico and José Superí broke the enemy lines and entered the city streets, closing the royalist retreat on the center. The retreat was hindered by the same fence they had erected as part of their fortifications. Finally they congregated on the main square, where Tristán decided to surrender, ordering the ringing of the church's bells. An envoy negotiated with General Belgrano that the next day the royalists would abandon the city on formation, with war honors, after relinquishing their weapons. Belgrano guaranteed their integrity and freedom in exchange for swearing not to raise arms against the rebels. Tristán later on would change sides and fight for the independentists in Bolivia. The prisoners captured before the surrender were later freed in exchange for the men that Goyeneche had captured in Upper Peru.

The 2,786 men remaining with Tristán surrendered the next day, giving up more than 2,000 muskets, swords, pistols, carbines, 10 cannons and their supplies. The generosity of Belgrano, who embraced Tristán and allowed him to keep his command symbols – they were personal friends, having been classmates at the University of Salamanca, been roommates in Madrid and loved the same woman – would cause surprise in Buenos Aires, but the decisive victory silenced the critics and earned him a prize of 40,000 pesos granted by the Assembly. Belgrano declined, asking that the money be used instead to build schools in Tucumán, Salta, Jujuy and Tarija.

Governor Feliciano Chiclana placed a wooden cross on the common grave where the 480 royalist and 103 independentist troops were buried with the inscription "A los vencedores y vencidos" (To the victors and the vanquished). Today the place is marked by the February 20th monument, designed by Torquat Tasso and made of stone from a local quarry. The reliefs on the sides were designed by the famous sculptor and local salteña Lola Mora.

Belgrano's army would continue to the north, to fight the forces of Joaquín de la Pezuela. Two major defeats at Vilcapugio and Ayohuma, would end the second campaign of the Army of the North.

== Bibliography ==
- Camogli, Pablo; Luciano de Privitellio (2005). Batallas por la Libertad (in Spanish). Buenos Aires: Aguilar. ISBN 987-04-0105-8.
