= Rise of the Argentine Republic =

Part of the history of Argentina

The Battle of San Lorenzo, showing the Libertador José de San Martín, trapped under his dead horse during the battle while is saved by Juan Bautista Cabral. The battle had a great symbolic, tactical and political impact, being the baptism of fire for the Grenadiers Regiment and the only battle of San Martin in Argentine territory.

The rise of the Argentine Republic was a process that took place in the first half of the 19th century in Argentina. The Republic has its origins on the territory of the Viceroyalty of the Río de la Plata, a colony of the Spanish Empire. The King of Spain appointed a viceroy to oversee the governance of the colony. The 1810 May Revolution staged a coup d'état and deposed the viceroy and, along with the Argentine war of independence, started a process of rupture with the Spanish monarchy with the formal Declaration of Independence in 1816 creating an independent republican state. All proposals to organize a local monarchy (as in the contemporary Empire of Brazil or the First Mexican Empire) failed, and no local monarch was ever crowned.

The national organization saw disputes about the type of relation that Buenos Aires should maintain with the other provinces, either as a centralised government or as a federation. The supporters of each project clashed in the Argentine Civil Wars in two camps known as the Unitarians and the Federalists. Some provinces of the former viceroyalty (turned first into the United Provinces of the Río de la Plata and then into the Argentine Confederation) tried to secede, some of them remained as independent countries up to modern day (Bolivia and Paraguay) and some rejoined Argentina (Republic of Entre Ríos). Two unitarian constitutions were promulgated and then rejected; the definitive one would be the federal Argentine Constitution of 1853, which is still in force.

== Background ==
The first political event that shaped the future country of Argentina was the creation of the Viceroyalty of the Río de la Plata. So far, the territories in it were neglected provinces of the Viceroyalty of Peru: as the Río de la Plata Basin did not have any precious metals or organized indigenous populations to exploit, all ships traded with Peru and New Spain instead. The viceroyalty sought to complement the existing trade routes with new ones, entering South America through the Río de la Plata. The new system did not work as expected, as Spain soon diverted most of its resources to the Napoleonic Wars. Trade with the Americas was hampered, and when Britain got a clear naval supremacy after the battle of Trafalgar, it almost ended.

The American and French Revolutions gave room to the Age of Enlightenment, a new era of ideas that rejected the absolute monarchies and favored liberalism instead. Spain sought to prevent the expansion of the new ideas across its territories, but many criollos came into contact with them during their university studies, either at the University of Chuquisaca or at Spain itself. Both in Spain and the Americas, people longed for a new type of government, such as a constitutional monarchy.

The ill-fated British invasions of the Río de la Plata set a precedent in weakening the monarchic authority. The viceroy, Rafael de Sobremonte, fled to Córdoba during the conflict, but could not return to Buenos Aires after the liberation: an open cabildo gave Santiago de Liniers (who led the Spanish forces in the conflict) the military authority over the city, while it prepared for a British counter-attack, and ordered Sobremonte to stay out. Liniers was later appointed viceroy and this appointment was confirmed by the Spanish king afterwards. This was the first time that the viceroy was deposed by local institutions, and not by the Spanish king himself.

== Power vacuum ==
The 1808 Peninsular War was triggered by an event of huge political weight: the king of Spain, Ferdinand VII, was captured and imprisoned by the French armies of Napoleon. The Supreme Central and Governing Junta of the Kingdom claimed sovereignty, and waged the war against the French. The viceroyalty was then divided in political factions with different political opinions about the legitimacy of the Junta. Conservatives thought that, in political terms, the Junta should be acknowledged as the king would be, and the remainder of the political organization of the Spanish Empire should stay unchanged. A group influenced by the French ideas instead thought that the Junta lacked the king's authority and each province should be free to appoint their own government Junta.

The first one to take this ideas into action was Francisco Javier de Elío, governor of the Banda Oriental, with an enmity with viceroy Liniers. Elío appointed himself as the head of a Junta in Montevideo, thus acting with autonomy from Liniers. However, he did not declare the independence of the Banda Oriental, nor rejected completely Liniers' authority. He was allied with Martín de Álzaga in Buenos Aires, who organized a mutiny against Liniers. His project was to replace Liniers with a Junta, ruling nominally in the name of Ferdinand VII, and declare independence once Spain was completely invaded by the French forces. The mutiny, however, was defeated by military bodies supporting Liniers, who stayed in power. The failed mutiny increased the power of criollos in the society: the peninsular military bodies, who supported the mutiny, were disbanded, and the only remaining ones were those of criollos.

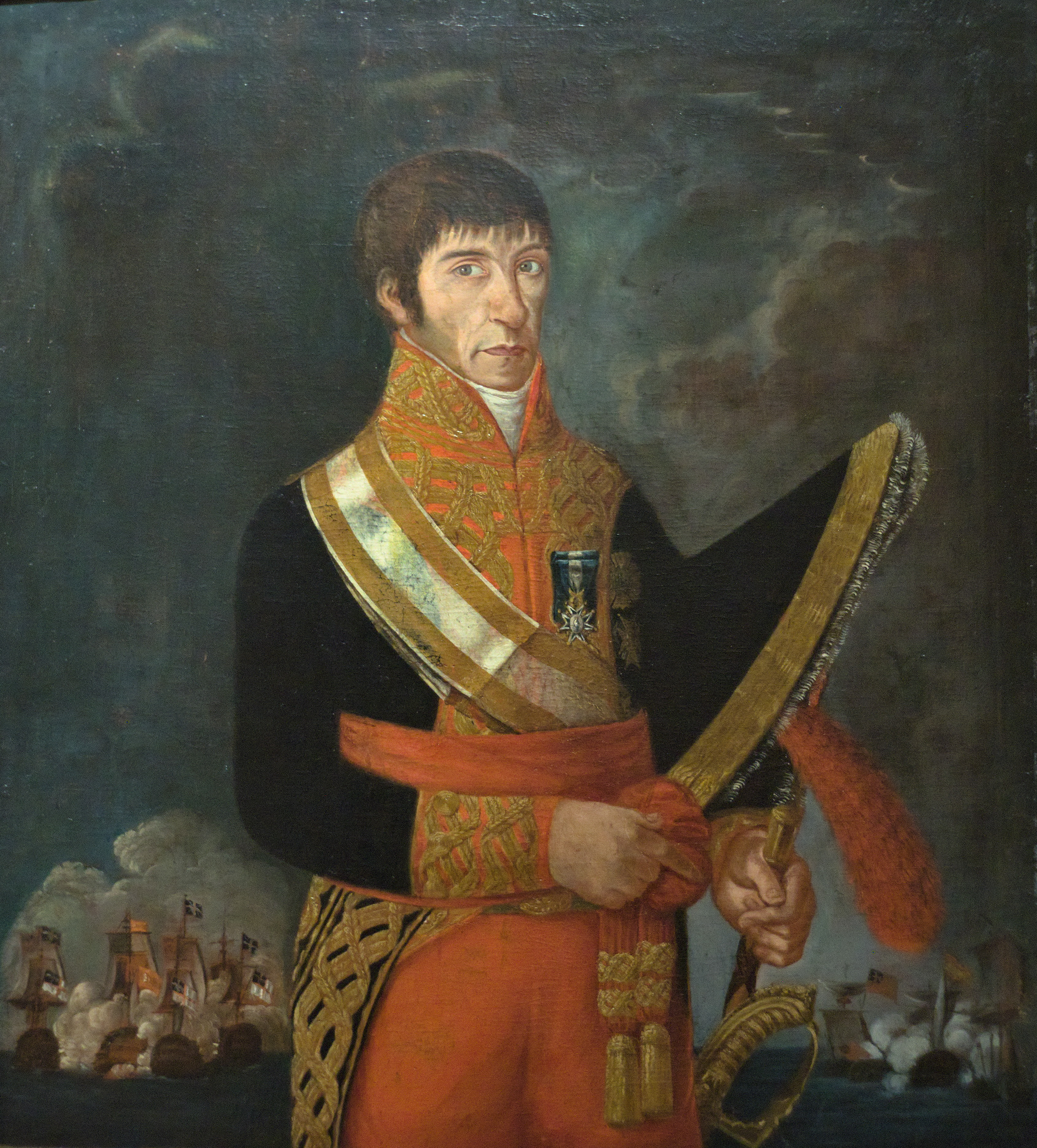
Baltasar Hidalgo de Cisneros, the last viceroy ruling in Buenos Aires

Carlota Joaquina, the sister of Ferdinand VII and wife of Portuguese prince regent John, who was in Brazil after fleeing the Napoleonic invasion of Portugal, avoided the capture of the Spanish royal family and attempted to take charge of the Spanish viceroyalties as regent. This political project, known as Carlotism, begun in hopes of preventing a French invasion of the Americas. A small secret society of criollos, composed of politicians such as Manuel Belgrano and Juan José Castelli, and military officers such as Antonio Beruti and Hipólito Vieytes, supported this project. They considered it an opportunity to get a local government instead of a European one, or a step towards a possible declaration of independence. The project was resisted by viceroy Liniers, most peninsulars, and some criollos, including Mariano Moreno, Juan José Paso, and Cornelio Saavedra. They suspected that it concealed Portuguese expansionist ambitions over the region. The supporters of Carlota Joaquina intended her to head a constitutional monarchy, whereas she wanted to govern as an absolute monarch; these conflicting goals undermined the project and caused it to fail. Britain, which had a strong influence in the politics of the Portuguese Empire, opposed the project as well: the British wanted to prevent Spain from splitting into many kingdoms, and considered Carlota Joaquina unable to prevent this.The disputes between Álzaga and Liniers were noticed by the Central Junta, which appointed a new viceroy instead of Liniers: Baltasar Hidalgo de Cisneros. The criollos resisted his appointment, arguing that Liniers had been confirmed as viceroy by the king, whereas Cisneros lacked such legitimacy. Manuel Belgrano urged Liniers to resist against Cisneros, with the support of the loyal military bodies under his command. Liniers, however, rejected the proposal and handed the government to Cisneros without resistance. Javier de Elío accepted the authority of the new viceroy and dissolved the Junta of Montevideo. Cisneros rearmed the disbanded peninsular militias and pardoned those responsible for the mutiny.

The example of Elío and Álzaga, however, was soon followed in Upper Peru. On 25 May 1809, the Chuquisaca Revolution deposed Ramón García de León y Pizarro as Governor of Chuquisaca and replaced him with Juan Antonio Álvarez de Arenales. On July 16 the La Paz revolution, led by Colonel Pedro Domingo Murillo, deposed the governor of La Paz and elected the Junta Tuitiva de los Derechos del Pueblo. La Paz declared itself independent from Spain, but Chiquisaca did not, and did not recognize the Junta Tuitiva. However, both Juntas were immediately defeated by the reactions from Lima and Buenos Aires, and the government returned to its previous state.

== Revolution and Freedom ==
=== May Revolution ===
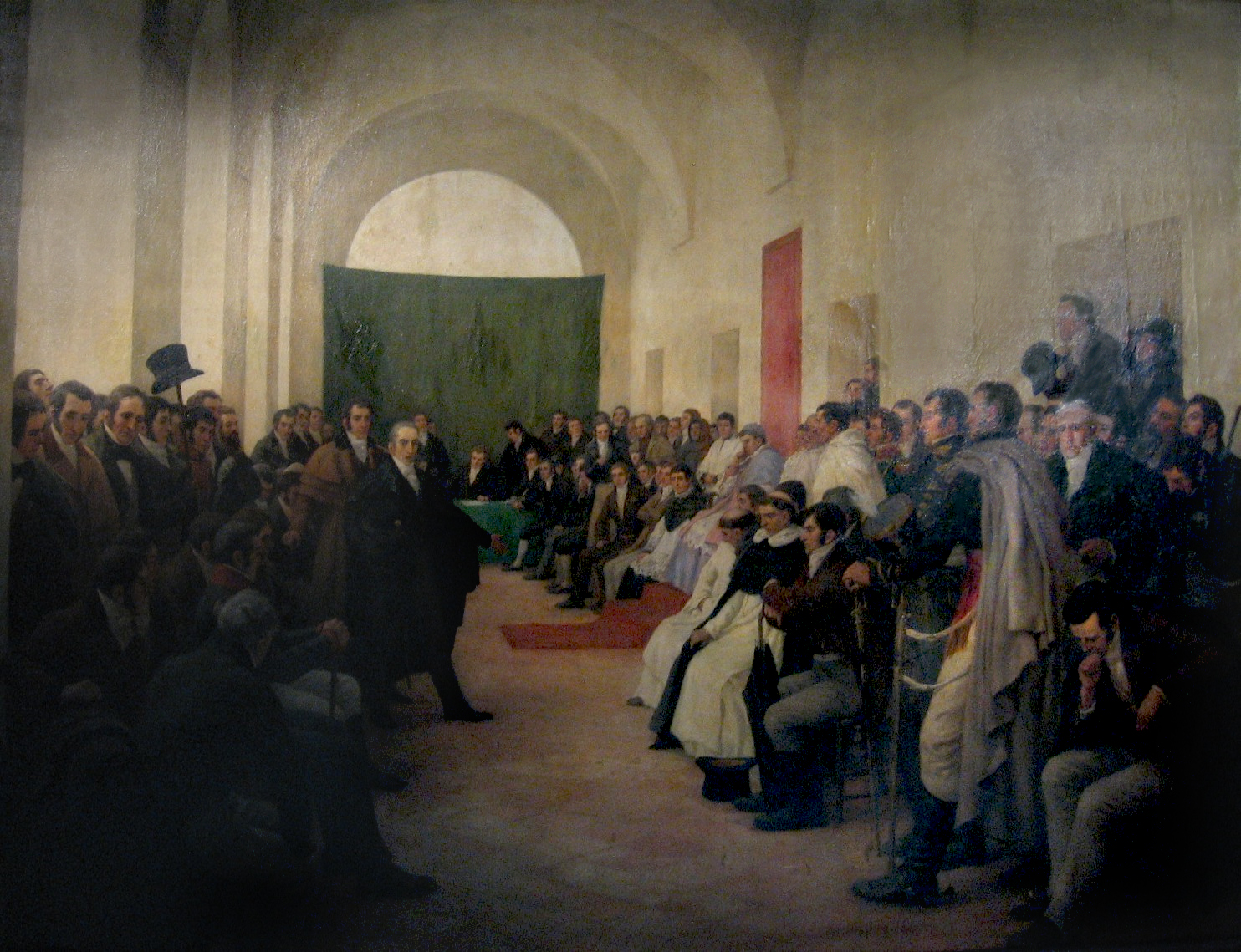
The open cabildo of May 22, a turning point of the May Revolution

The patriots in Buenos Aires finally took action against viceroy Cisneros when a ship from Europe informed that Seville had been conquered and the Junta disestablished, only Cádiz and the island of León were still standing, but their final defeat seemed imminent. Cisneros tried to conceal the news, but they spread anyway. He then proposed to prevent rushed actions, and suggested to establish a government body with the governors of other Spanish territories, such as Abascal or Nieto. Patriots made secret meetings to discuss the alternatives, and organized a joint plan: the military would deny Cisneros support against riots on the grounds that his authority ended with the fall of the Junta that had appointed him, and the politicians would request an open cabildo to discuss how to face the new scenario.

Once securing Cisneros' approval, they organized a demonstration in front of the cabildo, to make sure that Cisneros kept his word, and manipulated the attendance list to the assembly to prevent a similar move by the Cabildo. Thus, the open Cabildo allowed people from lower classes or not recognized as neighbours, contrary to established practices. The open cabildo, celebrated on May 22, discussed the different proposals: to maintain the status quo, to appoint other people to rule with Cisneros, to remove him and appoint a new governor, to appoint a government junta, etc. The dismissal of Cisneros and the appointment of a Junta got the majority of votes. The members of the Junta would be chosen by the Cabildo.

However, the Cabildo attempted to thwart the result of the open cabildo, and appointed Cisneros as head of the new Junta. He made the oath of office, but the appointment was seen as a betrayal of the Cabildo, causing huge demonstrations. By the night of May 24, Cisneros resigned, along with the criollo members of the Junta, Saavedra and Castelli. But the following day the Cabildo did not accept Cisneros' resignation, and ordered the military bodies to suppress the demonstrations by force. The military commanders denied such support, and stated that even if they accepted, their soldiers would mutiny against such orders. The demonstration broke into the Cabildo and overran some of its sections, so the members of the Cabildo finally agreed to accept Cisneros' resignation. The composition of the new Junta came from a document with hundreds of signatures; but who actually proposed the names remains unknown. The Primera Junta was thus the government that replaced Cisneros, ending the authority of the viceroys.

=== Primera Junta ===
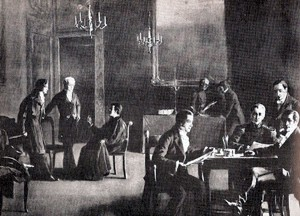
A meeting of the Primera Junta

The Primera Junta was initially resisted by the Cabildo and the Royal Audiencia, still loyal to the absolutist factions, and by other provinces who did not accept its authority. The Royal Audiencia secretly swore allegiance to the Regency Council, a new Junta created in Spain; this was done in defiance to the Primera Junta, who did not accept its authority over the Americas. As a result, the members of the Audiencia were exiled to Spain, along with Cisneros, with the pretext that there was a threat to their lives. Manuel Belgrano led a military campaign against Paraguay, and Juan José Castelli another one to Córdoba and the Upper Peru.

The Junta got divided between factions supporting the president Cornelio Saavedra and the secretary Mariano Moreno, who favored moderated and radical reforms respectively. Saavedra prevailed over Moreno by increasing the members of the Junta with the deputies that came from other provinces, which left him in a minority. Moreno resigned, and died during a diplomatic journey to Britain.

=== Junta Grande ===
The Primera Junta, with the new members, was renamed to Junta Grande. It promoted the creation of local Juntas at the other cities, replacing their governors. The departure of Mariano Moreno did not stop the disputes between his followers and those who supported Saavedra. Moreno's supporters organized an uprising. The military groups loyal to Saavedra, however, knew about it and stop it beforehand, and then requested the removal of all of the members of the Junta who were supporters of Moreno.

The high number of members of the Junta, however, slowed down its work as an executive power. The military defeats of Castelli and Belgrano, and the threat of the royalists at the Banda Oriental, prompted a change in the system of government. The executive power was then held by the First Triumvirate, while the Junta initially stayed as a legislative body, but it was disestablished after conflicting relations with the triumvirate.

=== First triumvirate ===
The Cabildo created a new executive power, the First Triumvirate, composed of three members: Manuel de Sarratea, Feliciano Chiclana and Juan José Paso. They were all natives of Buenos Aires, with no members from other cities. The Junta Grande, now working as a legislative power, drafted a set of rules for the division of powers, setting the rules, limits and purposes of the Triumvirate (executive), the Junta itself (legislative) and the Royal Audiencia (judiciary). However, this draft was repealed by the Triumvirate, which thought that the Junta held too much power. The Junta was disestablished soon afterward, and the deputies from other cities were removed from Buenos Aires.

The triumvirate undid the creation of local juntas at the provinces, instead favoring the rule of governors appointed from Buenos Aires. It also delayed the declaration of independence and the sanction of a constitution. The relation with the provinces shifted to a strong centralism, generating the resistance of José Gervasio Artigas at the Banda Oriental. Artigas organized the Federal League in response, with the Banda Oriental, the Argentine Mesopotamia, Santa Fe and Córdoba united against Buenos Aires under federalist principles.

The former supporters of Moreno united with José de San Martín, Carlos María de Alvear and other veterans of the Peninsular War, and with the Lodge of Rational Knights created by them. Together, they organized the Revolution of October 8, 1812, to oust the triumvirate from government.

== Sovereignty and independence ==
=== Second triumvirate and Assembly of the Year XIII ===
Once in government, the second triumvirate called for the Assembly of Year XIII, a constituent body with deputies from the other provinces that would write a national constitution. The Assembly did not claim their sovereignty to be derived from the king, but from the people, in a strong movement towards popular sovereignty; the mentions to Ferdinand VII were removed from public documents as well. By that time, Ferdinand VII had returned to the throne of Spain, and began the absolutist restoration. The assembly chose the national coat of arms, the national anthem, allowed the use of the modern flag of Argentina as a war flag, and printed money. However, it did not declare independence.

The deputies from the Banda Oriental were rejected, increasing the conflicts with Artigas. His deputies had instructions to promote a declaration of independence and promote republicanism and federalism as types of government.

The Assembly initially had a higher authority than the triumvirate, but to help in the warfare, it granted it higher power afterwards. In need of an even stronger government, it replaced the triumvirate as executive power with the Supreme Director, a unipersonal office.

=== Congress of Tucumán ===
The Supreme Director of the United Provinces of the Río de la Plata replaced the role of the triumvirate. The first one was Gervasio Antonio de Posadas, the uncle of Carlos María de Alvear, replaced by Alvear himself some time afterwards. Facing an adverse context in the war of independence, Alvear considered turning the United Provinces into a British protectorate, which motivated a coup against him.

The Assembly of the Year XIII was closed, but a new one was formed later, the Congress of Tucumán. To avoid the animosity against Buenos Aires, it was not located in that city but in Tucumán. The Congress did not include deputies from the provinces ruled by Artigas, and included others from provinces which are currently part of Bolivia. The Congress finally declared the independence of the United Provinces. There was a plan to move the capital to Cusco and crown an Inca as king, which was resisted by Buenos Aires. The Congress then moved to Buenos Aires, which could influence them better. The Inca plan was forgotten, and the Congress drafted the 1819 constitution. This constitution did not choose a specific type of government, but the elites in Buenos Aires thought to bring a European prince to Buenos Aires and appoint him king. Estanislao López and Francisco Ramírez resisted the project, and attacked Buenos Aires. Neither San Martín nor Belgrano provided military help. Buenos Aires fell in the battle of Cepeda, which ended the authority of the Supreme Directors. The defeat started the Anarchy of the year XX, a period where the provinces would rule themselves without a national head of state.

== Anarchy ==
With the defeat of Buenos Aires in Cepeda, the country was left without a head of state. An open cabildo in Buenos Aires elected a new governor, Manuel de Sarratea, who negotiated the Treaty of Pilar with Ramírez and López. The treaty guaranteed national unity and a federalist system of government, the end of hostilities between the provinces, and called for a new congress to decide a new national government. This congress, however, was never called because of the ongoing wars. The Banda Oriental was invaded by the United Kingdom of Portugal, Brazil and the Algarves, but Ramírez and López feared that by joining the war their provinces would be invaded as well, so instead they agreed on a defense pact with Buenos Aires. This pact would be ratified by the quadrilateral treaty of 1822. During this period, the provinces maintained national unity though treaties, being ruled by caudillos.

Buenos Aires lost the authority to appoint governors in the provinces, which increased their autonomy. Santa Fe was the first province to write a provincial constitution. Ramírez proclaimed the independence of the Republic of Entre Ríos, with the intention to annex Paraguay and Buenos Aires and liberate the Banda Oriental with their combined forces, but this short-lived project ended after his assassination. The province of Corrientes was split from Entre Ríos after the disestablishment of the proposed state.

== First presidential attempt ==
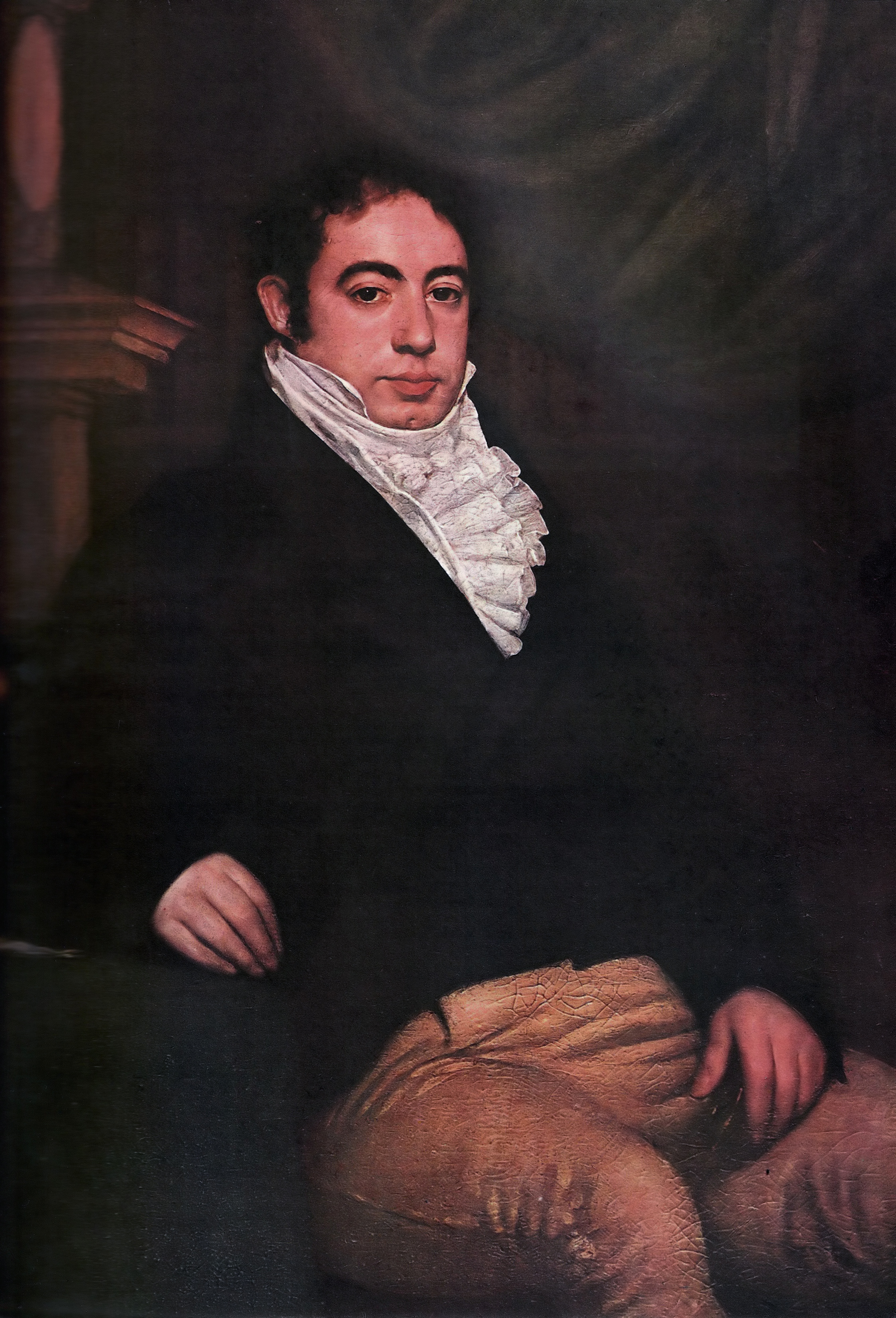
Bernardino Rivadavia, first president of Argentina

The Banda oriental, which had been annexed into the Kingdom of Brazil and renamed as Cisplatina, was liberated by the Thirty-Three Orientals, and proclaimed its adhesion to the United Provinces. The now Empire of Brazil did not recognize it, leading to the Cisplatine War. It was thought then in Buenos Aires that to wage the war the country should have a proper head of state, so a new congress began to write a constitution for this, which would be enacted in 1826. However, because of the urgency, Bernardino Rivadavia was not appointed president after the promulgation of said constitution, but through a special law that created the office of president.

The new constitution was a republican one, defining the existence and function of the three powers. It referenced the country as "Argentina".

Rivadavia and the 1826 constitution found strong resistance from both unitarians and federalists. The unitarians did not support the law that turned Buenos Aires into the capital city of Argentina and nationalized its port, as the Buenos Aires province would lose the exclusive benefit from it. The federalists did not accept that the president would have the power to appoint provincial governors. His authority was further weakened by the outcome of the war: despite some military victories against Brazil, Rivadavia wanted the army to return and protect him from an attack from the other provinces, so he ordered to hasten a treaty ending the war. This treaty did not formalize the region as an Argentine province, but as the independent country of Uruguay. Highly unpopular, Rivadavia resigned and left to Europe. The 1826 constitution was repealed, and the political organization returned to its previous state.

== Execution of Dorrego ==
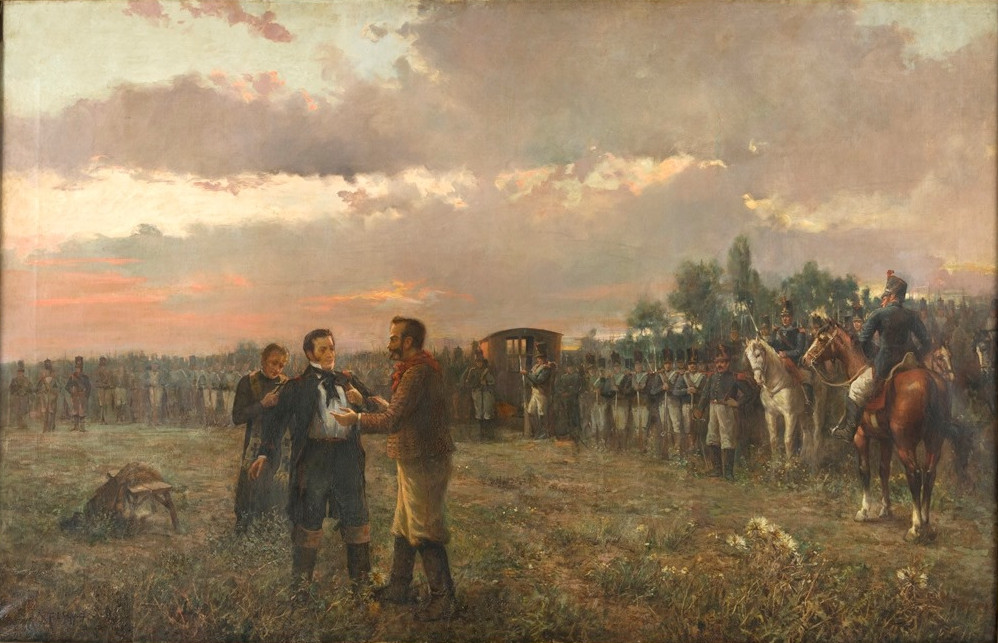
Execution of Manuel Dorrego

With the office of president abolished, the provinces ruled themselves once more. Manuel Dorrego was appointed governor of Buenos Aires. In the lack of a proper head of state, the governor of Buenos Aires received some powers to fill that void, such as managing international relations or paying the foreign debt.

Dorrego's rule was short-lived. When the armies returned from the war, they organized a coup against Dorrego, headed by Juan Lavalle. Lavalle captured and executed Dorrego, appointed himself governor of Buenos Aires, closed the legislature and began a campaign against federalists, together with José María Paz. Lavalle was not recognized as a legitimate governor by the other provinces, and sought the support of José de San Martín, who had returned from Europe, to aid him in the war against Brazil. San Martín refused to help Lavalle at all, and returned to Europe. The hacendado Juan Manuel de Rosas organized a militia with people from the countryside to stand against Lavalle, while Estanislao López dealt with Paz. Lavalle was defeated by Rosas, who restored the legislature. Juan José Viamonte was appointed governor, and then Rosas himself.

== The Federal pact ==
José María Paz expanded his influence across the northern provinces, creating the Unitarian League. The provinces of Buenos Aires, Santa Fe and Entre Ríos signed the Federal Pact in response, and quickly defeated the Unitarian League by capturing Paz. The Federal Pact was kept for national organization after the unitarian defeat. The provinces of Córdoba, Santiago del Estero, La Rioja and Cuyo joined the Federal Pact in 1831, Catamarca, Tucumán and Salta also joined following year. The pact served both as a military alliance (both against non-signing provinces that attacked them, or against other countries) and as a sort of constitution.

The Federal Pact had an article declaring that a new constituent assembly should be called to write a constitution as soon as the military threats were defeated. The defeat of Paz and the expansion of the Federal Pact further ushered in a period of economic and political stability. As a result, federalists were divided between two political trends: those who wanted the calling of such Constituent Assembly, and those who supported Rosas in delaying it. Rosas thought that the best way to organize the Argentine Confederation was as a federation of federated states, similar to the states of the United States; each one should write its own local constitution and organize itself, and a national constitution should be written at the end, without being rushed.

== The Rosas era ==
Rosas resigned as governor, and moved to the south. The later conflicts between Rosist and anti-Rosist federals led to the Revolution of the Restorers, which ousted Juan Ramón Balcarce and replaced him with the Rosist Juan José Viamonte.

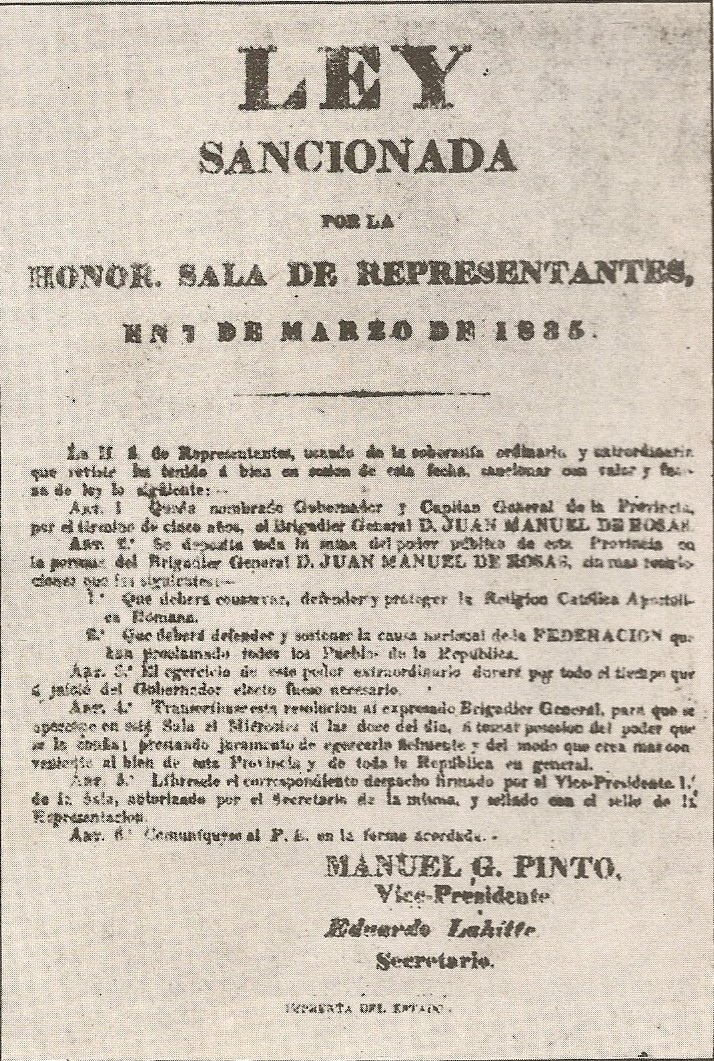
The Buenos Aires legislature released the sum of public power on Rosas

The weak governments of Balcarce and Viamonte led the legislature to request Rosas to take the government once more. For doing so he requested the sum of public power, which the legislature denied four times. Rosas even resigned as commander of militias to influence the legislature. The context changed with the social commotion generated by the death of Facundo Quiroga, responsibility for which is disputed (different authors attribute it to Estanislao López, the Reinafé brothers, or even Rosas himself). The legislature then accepted to give him the sum of public power. Even so, Rosas requested confirmation on whenever the people agreed with it, so the legislature organized a referendum about it. Every free man at the age of majority living in the city was allowed to vote for "Yes" or "No"; 9,316 votes supported the release of the sum of public power on Rosas, and only 4 rejected it. There are divided opinions on the topic: Domingo Faustino Sarmiento compared Rosas with historical dictators, while José de San Martín considered that the situation in the country was so chaotic that a strong authority was needed to create order.

Although slavery was not abolished during Rosas' rule, Afro Argentines had a positive image of him. He allowed them to gather in groups related to their African origin, and financed their activities. Troop formations included many of them, because joining the army was one of the ways to become a free negro, and in many cases slave owners were forced to release them to strengthen the armies. There was an army made specifically of free blacks, the "Fourth Battalion of Active Militia". The liberal policy towards slaves generated controversy with neighbouring Brazil, because fugitive slaves from Brazil saw Argentina as a safe haven: they were recognized as free men at the moment they crossed the Argentine border, and by joining the armies they were protected from persecution of their former masters.

The people who opposed Rosas formed a group called Asociacion de Mayo or May Brotherhood. It was a literary group that became politically active and aimed at exposing Rosas' actions. Some of the literature against him includes The Slaughter House, Socialist Dogma, Amalia and Facundo. Meetings which had high attendance at first soon had few members attending out of fear of prosecution. Rosas' opponents during his rule were dissidents, such as José María Paz, Salvador M. del Carril, Juan Bautista Alberdi, Esteban Echeverria, Bartolomé Mitre and Domingo Faustino Sarmiento. Rosas political opponents were exiled to other countries, such as Uruguay and Chile.

The 17 year long rule of Rosas was influenced by permanent warfare, both from unitarians and by other countries. The Peru–Bolivian Confederation, allied with France, declared the War of the Confederation against Argentina and Chile; France supported it by imposing a naval blockade over Buenos Aires, which was maintained even after the Peru-Bolivian defeat. The French helped Fructuoso Rivera to oust the Uruguayan president Manuel Oribe from power, so that Rivera helped them against Rosas. France gave up the blockade, but Rosas still supported Oribe in the Uruguayan Civil War to reestablish his rule in Uruguay. The conflict against Rivera led to a renewed conflict with France, this time allied with Britain. The Anglo-French blockade of the Río de la Plata was defeated as well. Justo José de Urquiza, governor of Entre Ríos, thought by then that it was the time required by the Federal Pact to establish a Constitution, but Rosas still kept his idea of doing it after all provinces had already organized themselves. With the bulk of the army of the Confederation on his side and allied with Brazil and Uruguayan forces, Urquiza defeated both the army of Oribe laying siege to Montevideo and then Rosas himself in the battle of Caseros.

== The 1853 Constitution ==
Urquiza united the provinces in the San Nicolás Agreement, seeking consensus for the new constitution. The Constituent Assembly met in Santa Fe and wrote the Argentine Constitution of 1853. The constitution established a representative, republican and federal government. The legislative power was bicameral, and the executive power was held by a president, elected by an electoral college, with a six-year term and with no chance of reelection. The judiciary was accepted as an independent power. The Catholicism was appointed the official religion of the country, but allowing freedom of religion.

== See also ==
- Religion in the United Provinces of the Río de la Plata
- Argentine War of Independence
