= Second Triumvirate (Argentina) =

1812–1814 governing body

Second Triumvirate Segundo Triunvirato
- United Provinces of the Río de la Plata

Type
- Type: Triumvirate

History
- Established: 1812
- Disbanded: 1814
- Preceded by: First Triumvirate
- Succeeded by: Supreme Director of the United Provinces of the Río de la Plata
- Seats: 3

Footnotes
- See also: Asamblea del Año XIII

The Second Triumvirate (Spanish: Segundo Triunvirato) was the governing body of the United Provinces of the Río de la Plata (present-day Argentina and Uruguay) that followed the First Triumvirate in 1812, shortly after the May Revolution, and lasted 2 years.

== History ==
The second triumvirate was formed after the Revolution of 8 October 1812, when the generals José de San Martín and Carlos María de Alvear joined forces with former supporters of Mariano Moreno and deposed the First Triumvirate. When the members of the First Triumvirate were deposed, the Cabildo appointed new ones. Nicolás Rodríguez Peña was appointed by 172 votes against 12, Antonio Álvarez Jonte by 147 against 35, and Juan José Paso by 96 against 87. The new triumvirate called the Assembly of Year XIII, a popular request that the First Triumvirate had refused to follow. The Triumvirate began its functions on 8 October 1812.

The second triumvirate took measures against the members of the first triumvirate. Pueyrredón was exiled to San Luis, and Rivadavia was imprisoned and put on trial. Chiclana was put on trial, found innocent, and then appointed as governor of Salta. Sarratea, under protection of the British diplomacy, did not face any reprisals.

The main actions of the Triumvirate were:

- to establish a commission on 4 December 1812 for the creation of the Constitution of Argentina
- to issue a call for the Assembly of Year XIII on 31 January 1813.
- to create the Province of Cuyo (the present-day provinces of Mendoza, San Juan and San Luis) on 14 November 1813.

As the 1813 Assembly decided to replace the Triumvirate with a one-person Supreme Director, it ceased its functions on 22 January 1814, and Gervasio Antonio de Posadas assumed control as the first Supreme Director of the United Provinces of the Río de la Plata. One year later, on 31 January 1815, he was replaced by his nephew Carlos María de Alvear, relying on the support of the powerful Logia Lautaro.

== Members ==
Second Triumvirate original members
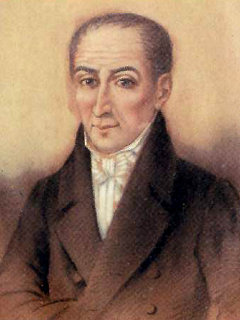
Juan José Paso

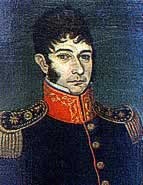
Nicolás Rodríguez Peña

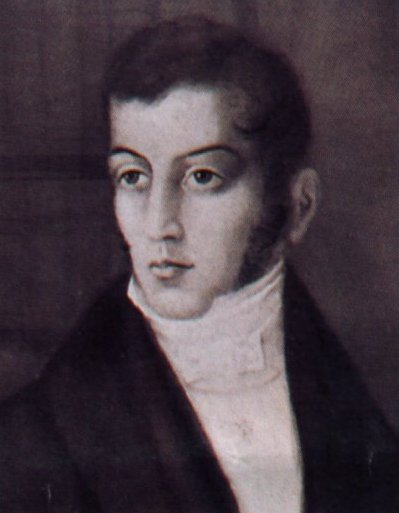
Antonio Álvarez Jonte

== Bibliography ==
- Segreti, Carlos (1980). La aurora de la Independencia. Memorial de la Patria (in Spanish). Vol. Tomo II. Buenos Aires: Editorial La Bastilla.
- Ternavasio, Marcela (2007). Gobernar la Revolución (in Spanish). Buenos Aires: Editorial Siglo Veintiuno.
- Galasso, Norberto (2009). Seamos Libres y lo demás no importa nada. Buenos Aires: Colihue. ISBN 978-950-581-779-5.
