= Nicolás Rodríguez Peña =

Argentine politician (1775–1853)

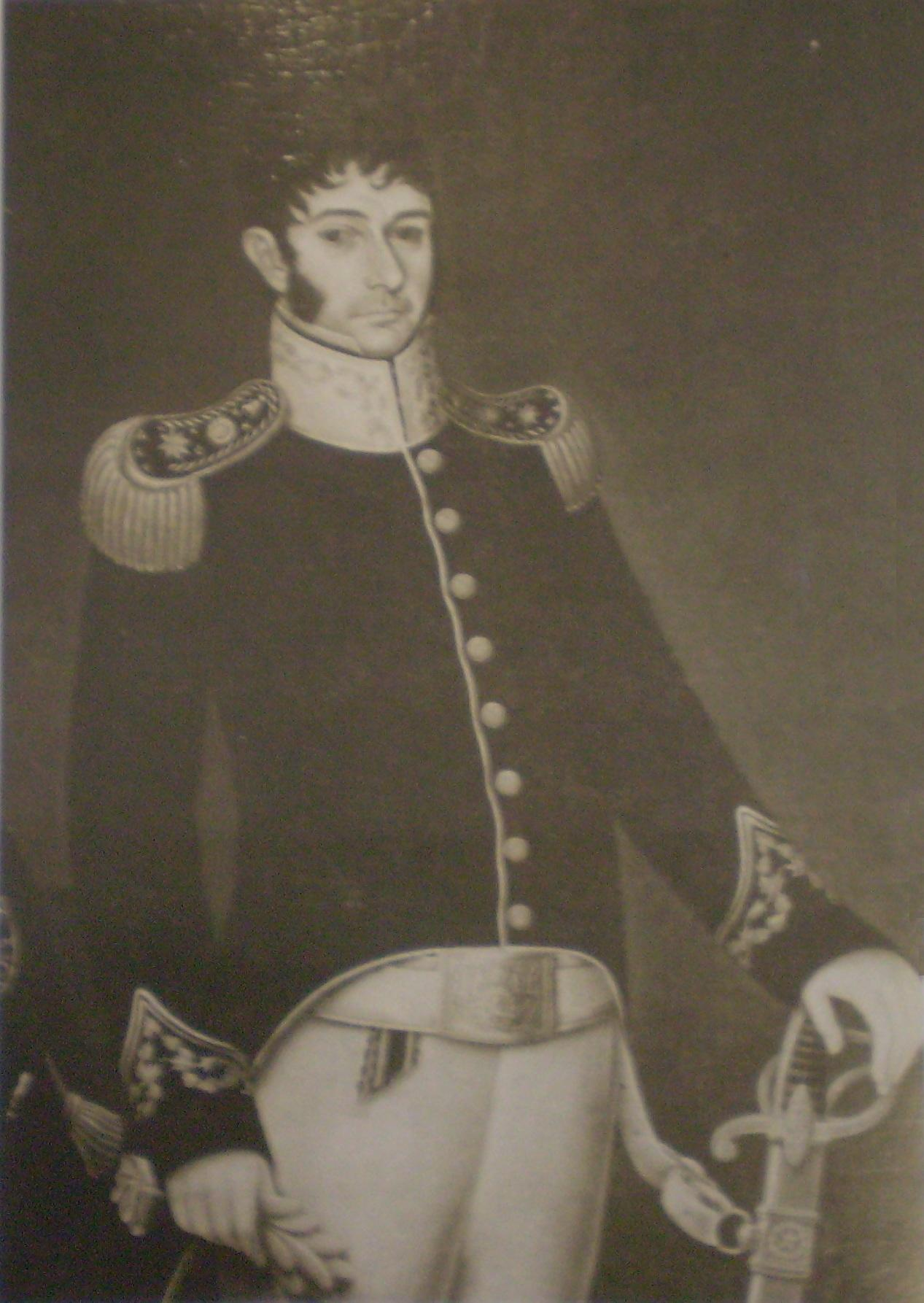

Member of the Second Triumvirate
- In office 8 October 1812 – 31 January 1814 Serving with Juan José Paso, Antonio A. Jonte
- Preceded by: First Triumvirate
- Succeeded by: Office abolished

Personal details
- Born: 30 April 1775 Buenos Aires, Viceroyalty of Peru
- Died: 3 December 1853 (aged 78) Santiago, Chile
- Spouse: Maria Casilda de Igarzabal
- Education: Real Colegio San Carlos
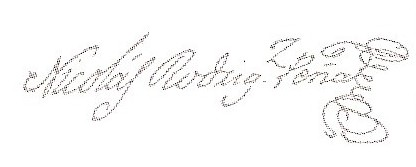
- Signature

Nicolás Rodriguez Peña (30 April 1775 – 3 December 1853) was an Argentine politician. Born in Buenos Aires in April 1775, he worked in commerce which allowed him to amass a considerable fortune. Among his several successful businesses, he had a soap factory partnership with Hipólito Vieytes, which was a centre of conspirators during the revolution against Spanish rule. In 1805 he was a member of the "Independence Lodge", a masonic lodge, along with other prominent revolutionary patriots such as Juan José Castelli and Manuel Belgrano. This group used to meet in his ranch, then situated in what today is Rodríguez Peña square in Buenos Aires.

He was a member of the local militia in the British invasions of the Río de la Plata (1806 and 1807), and after taking part as promoter and financier of the May Revolution, he collaborated in the formation of the Primera Junta. Was secretary to Castelli, and went with him in the liberation army's expedition to Córdoba, where he authorized the death by firing squad of the previous viceroy Santiago de Liniers. After fighting at the Battle of Suipacha he entered Upper Peru, where he was for a short time governor of La Paz.

Returning to Buenos Aires in February, he took the place of Mariano Moreno at the First Junta ("Primera Junta"). He was deposed by the revolution of April 1811 and confined to San Juan Province. Rodríguez Peña returned later the same year to Buenos Aires, returning to commerce once again. He joined the Logia Lautaro, directed by Carlos María de Alvear. Due to the revolution of October 1812, he was elected member of the Second Triumvirate, a government just created by the Constitutional Congress.

When the Triumvirate was dissolved, the Supreme Director, Gervasio Antonio de Posadas, selected him to preside the State Council ("Consejo de Estado"). He was also assigned as a colonel in the army. In 1814 he was named first governor delegate of the Eastern Province (present-day Uruguay), a post he held for only a short time.

After the fall of Director Alvear, he was charged, judged, and exiled, and was allowed to live in San Juan. In 1816 he went back to Buenos Aires, but the new Supreme Director, Juan Martín de Pueyrredón, forced him to return to exile in San Juan where he helped José de San Martín organize the Army of the Andes for the crossing into Chile.

After the Battle of Chacabuco he exiled himself in Santiago de Chile, where he remained until his death in December 1853. His remains were interred in La Recoleta Cemetery in Buenos Aires.

Peña was married to Maria Casilda de Igarzabal. Their son, Demetrio Rodríguez Peña was a prominent writer.
