= Antonio Álvarez Jonte =

Argentine politician

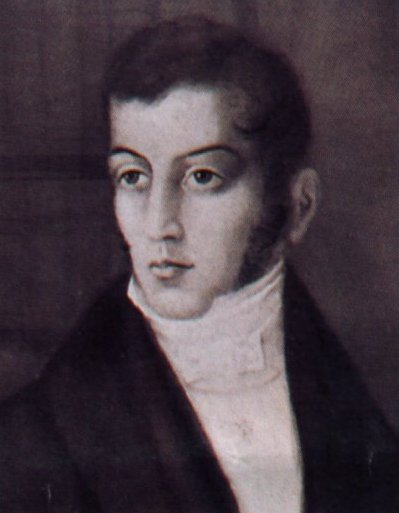

Personal details
- Born: 1784 Madrid, Spain
- Died: October 18, 1820 (aged 35–36) Pisco, Peru
- Profession: politician

Antonio Álvarez Jonte (1784 – October 18, 1820) was an Argentine politician. He was born in Madrid and moved with parents to Córdoba when young. He studied law at Córdoba University and obtained his doctorate at the Real Universidad de San Felipe in Santiago. He opened a law practice in Buenos Aires, and lived there at the time of the British invasions. He offered his services as volunteer in the militia but was declined due to poor health.

== Second Tiumvirate ==
Álvarez Jonte took part on the preparations for the May Revolution in 1810. After the revolution, the newly constituted Primera Junta sent him to Chile to try to foment a similar revolution there. This happened in October 1810, and Álvarez Jonte became the first Argentine ambassador to this country.

Towards the end of 1810 he was in Buenos Aires and he joined Mariano Moreno's revolutionary group. The Junta named him member of the Cabildo, where he pressed to dissolve the governing Junta when news of the Battle of Huaqui disaster arrived. He supported the formation of the First Triumvirate, and by their initiative he was named again rector of the Cabildo for the year 1812. He moved to the opposition when the government of Rivadavia dissolved the first national assembly in 1812.

Álvarez Jonte joined the Lautaro lodge, founded by Alvear and San Martín, and supported the October 1812 revolution, (started by San Martín after the arrival of the news of the military victory at the Battle of Tucumán). By this movement the First Triumvirate was dissolved and replaced by a Second Triumvirate, formed by Juan José Paso, Nicolás Rodríguez Peña, and Álvarez Jonte. A short while later Paso was replaced by José Julián Pérez, and a few months later, Rodríguez Peña was replaced by Gervasio Posadas, Alvear's uncle.

In reality, the government was controlled by the Lautaro Lodge and by Alvear. The Triumvirate called for a National Constitutional Assembly, dominated by Buenos Aires where most of the deputies from the interior of the country were named by the Lodge, in Buenos Aires. The Assembly did not meet its objectives, not having declared independence from Spain, nor sanctioning any constitution.

By the end of 1813, Juan Larrea (a rich and influential friend of Alvear and of British commerce) replace Álvarez Jonte, who was named to lead the commission investigating the military defeats at Vilcapugio and Ayohuma.

== Collaboration with San Martín ==
Álvarez Jonte travelled to Tucumán to start the investigations and legal proceedings, but later he declined to judge general Belgrano. In early 1814 he reorganized the government of Tucumán Province. Was then named as military comptroller to the Army of the North during the short period where its commander in chief was San Martín. Álvarez Jonte then returned to Buenos Aires, where he served as general war comptroller, and worked in this post during the brief government of Alvear.

After the mutiny that led to the Alvear's fall from government, he was exiled to London. There he joined the local Lautaro Lodge and dedicated himself to the formation of a navy squadron for Chile, recently liberated from Spain by San Martín, supporting the latter's plans to attack the Viceroyalty of Peru by sea.

He arrived in Chile with Admiral Thomas Cochrane in November 1818, with the navy's ships intended to move the Army of the Andes to Peru. Even though he fell ill, he was named army comptroller and secretary to San Martín. He accompanied Cochrane in the first naval campaign to the port of El Callao.

In August 1820 he embarked with San Martín towards Peru again. A short time after arriving, he fell gravely ill (probably of tuberculosis) and died in October 1820 in the port of Pisco.

An avenue in Buenos Aires's Monte Castro neighborhood, is named after him.
