= Juan José Paso =

Argentine politician

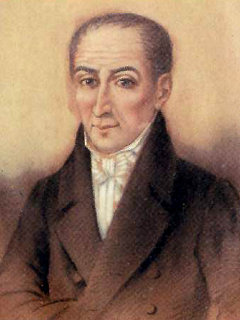

Member of the Primera Junta and the Junta Grande
- In office 25 May 1810 – December 1811
- President: Cornelio Saavedra

Member of the First Triumvirate
- In office 23 September 1811 – 23 March 1812 Serving with Feliciano Chiclana, Manuel de Sarratea
- Succeeded by: Juan Martín de Pueyrredón

Member of the Second Triumvirate
- In office 8 October 1812 – 20 February 1813 Serving with Antonio Álvarez Jonte, Nicolás Rodríguez Peña
- Succeeded by: José Julián Pérez

Representative to the Congress of Tucumán
- In office 24 March 1816 – 11 February 1820

Personal details
- Born: 2 January 1758 Buenos Aires
- Died: 10 September 1833 (aged 75) Buenos Aires

Juan José Esteban Paso, (January 2, 1758, Buenos Aires – September 10, 1833) was an Argentine politician who participated in the events that started the Argentine War of Independence known as May Revolution of 1810.

== Biography ==
=== Early life ===
Juan José Paso is the son of Domingo de Passo. Domingo left Spain and moved to Buenos Aires in 1750. He worked as a baker; Buenos Aires had a scarce production of bread at the time. Domingo got married with María Manuela Fernández Escandón on March 8, 1755. Domingo became a vecino after his marriage. Their son Juan José Esteban Paso was born on January 2, 1758, and baptized five days later. The place of Paso's initial education is unknown, but it was not the Real Colegio San Carlos, as he is not among its recorded list of students.

Paso studied at the University of Córdoba and graduated in Theology in 1779. Back in Buenos Aires, he was named professor of philosophy at the Colegio Real de San Carlos (Royal School of San Carlos). In 1783 he moved to the Upper Peru and studied law in the University of Chuquisaca; only to return to Buenos Aires as a lawyer in 1803. After the British invasions of the Río de la Plata he pursued a political career as a revolutionary leader moved by the new national identity that was growing among the 'criollos'.

Like many other nineteenth century Argentines prominent in public life, he was a freemason.

=== Juntas ===
Paso assisted with the Cabildo Abierto of May 22, 1810 and supported the faction that sought the dismissal of viceroy Baltasar Hidalgo de Cisneros, convincing many others with a fervent speech. He participated in the creation of the First Junta (Primera Junta) government on May 25 and was named Secretary of the Junta along with Mariano Moreno, with whom he shared political points of view. He was sent by the Junta to Montevideo (today's Uruguay capital city) to spread the ideas of the revolution.

Paso was also part of the First Triumvirate and the Second Triumvirate that ruled the United Provinces of the Río de la Plata (Argentina) between 1811 and 1814. During this period he participated in the Asamblea del año XIII and was sent to Chile as a representative. But the negotiations with Chilean patriots failed and the Capitaincy of Chile refused to take part in the Union.

=== Congress of Tucumán ===
In 1815 Paso was named assistant to the Supreme Director and war consultant. He was later elected a representative to the Congress of Tucumán that declared the Argentine Independence on July 9, 1816. As Secretary to this Congress, Paso had the honor of reading the independence act. However, he was then imprisoned and charged of treason for supporting the monarchist faction that wanted a monarchy as government for the new nation. He was quickly released along with the other monarchist deputies.

=== Buenos Aires' legislature ===
Elected a member of the Buenos Aires Province Legislature in 1822, Paso later became president of that body. In 1824, he was again elected representative for the National Congress and supported the nomination of Bernardino Rivadavia as the first President of Argentina.

He retired from politics in 1826 disgusted with the violent disagreements among the provinces that divided themselves between Unitarians and Federalists.

== Bibliography ==
- Tanzi, Héctor (1998). Juan José Paso, el político. Argentina: Ciudad Argentina. ISBN 987-507-067-X.
