= Feliciano Chiclana =

Argentine lawyer, soldier and judge

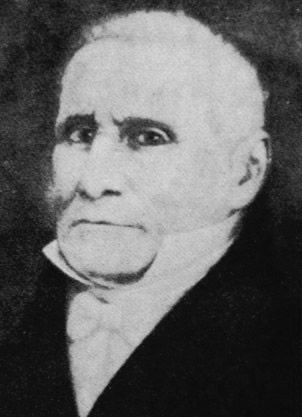
- Portrait of Feliciano Chiclana

Member of the First Triumvirate
- In office September 23, 1811 – October 8, 1812 Serving with Manuel de Sarratea, Juan José Paso, Juan Martín de Pueyrredón

Personal details
- Born: June 9, 1761 Buenos Aires
- Died: September 17, 1826 (aged 65) Buenos Aires
- Resting place: La Recoleta cemetery
- Party: Patriot
- Other political affiliations: Saavedrism
- Education: Real Colegio San Carlos

Military service
- Allegiance: Viceroyalty of the Río de la Plata, United Provinces of the Río de la Plata
- Years of service: 1806-1822
- Rank: Colonel
- Battles/wars: British invasions of the Río de la Plata; Argentine War of Independence

Feliciano Antonio Chiclana (June 9, 1761 in Buenos Aires – September 17, 1826 in Buenos Aires) was an Argentine lawyer, soldier, and judge.

== Biography ==
Feliciano Chiclana studied at the Colegio de San Carlos and in 1783 he finished with a law degree at the Universidad de Chile.

In 1791 he returned to Buenos Aires where he became the secretary to the mayor of the Buenos Aires Cabildo. During the British invasions of the Río de la Plata in 1806 he fought as captain of the 1st Patricians' Infantry Regiment. After the reconquest of the city he joined the party of General Cornelio Saavedra.

In 1810, he helped in the planning for the May Revolution as legal counsel to the Cabildo. He was part of the group of moderates which wanted the Cabildo to assume command of the government during the Napoleonic invasion of Spain, only to return it later to the Spanish Crown. Therefore, on May 22, 1810 he voted to depose the viceroy.

The Primera Junta named him comptroller of the Auxiliary Army of Upper Peru with the rank of Colonel and in August 1810 he was named governor of Salta Province (which is now Jujuy Province).

In November 1810 he received orders from Buenos Aires to leave his current post and assume a new post as the new governor of Potosí and in 1811 he returned to Buenos Aires and became a part of the First Triumvirate, along with Juan José Paso and Manuel de Sarratea. He was a triumvir until he was deposed on October 8, 1812.

In November 1812 he was again named governor of Salta where he worked closely with Manuel Belgrano during the second Upper Peru campaign. He reported to the government of Buenos Aires since the people of Salta flew the modern flag of Argentina during the third commemoration of the May Revolution. He remained governor of Salta until October 26, 1813 when he was succeeded by Francisco Fernández de la Cruz.

Between 1814 and 1816 he was in charge of provisioning the Auxiliary Army of Upper Peru;

In 1817 he was politically opposed by the Supreme director Juan Martín de Pueyrredón and was exiled to Baltimore in the United States of America.

In 1818 he was allowed to return to Argentina, only to be exiled again, this time to Mendoza, but due to illness he was not able to make the trip.

Finally, in 1819, retaining his rank of colonel, he was ordered on his last mission, to negotiate peace with the native tribe of the Ranquel. He managed to forge a peace treaty with the tribe.

He retired from the army in 1822 and died in Buenos Aires in September 1826. He is interred in the La Recoleta Cemetery in Buenos Aires.

== Bibliography ==
- Perazzo, Alberto Rubén (2006). Nuestras banderas: vexilología argentina. Argentina: Editorial Dunken. ISBN 987-02-1809-1.
- Fernández, Jorge (2006). Historia Argentina: 1810-1930. Argentina: Universidad Nacional del Litoral. ISBN 987-508-331-3.
