= Juan Pedro Aguirre =

Argentine revolutionary, financier and interim Supreme Director

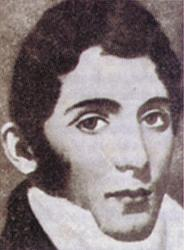
- Aguirre's portrait

Interim Supreme Director of the United Provinces of the Río de la Plata
- In office 1 February 1820 – 5 February 1820
- Preceded by: José Rondeau
- Succeeded by: Office abolished

Personal details
- Born: Juan Pedro Julián Aguirre y López de Anaya; October 19, 1781 Buenos Aires
- Died: July 17, 1837 (aged 55) Buenos Aires
- Profession: Soldier; public financer

Juan Pedro Julián Aguirre y López de Anaya (19 October 1781 – 17 July 1837) was an Argentine revolutionary and politician who briefly served as the last Supreme Director of the United Provinces of the Río de la Plata in February 1820. A leading figure in early republican finance, he presided over the Bank of Buenos Aires (1822–1824) and became the first president of the Banco Nacional (1826), created during the Rivadavia reforms.

== Biography ==
Aguirre was born in Buenos Aires on 19 October 1781 and died in the same city on 17 July 1837. He took part in the political process opened by the May Revolution and pursued a military and civic career in Buenos Aires.

In early 1820, during the crisis following the Battle of Cepeda, the Congress designated him interim Supreme Director. He served from 1 to 11 February 1820, after which the directorial regime was dissolved and the office abolished.

Aguirre played prominent roles in public finance. He served on and chaired bodies linked to the management of public credit, including the commission related to the Baring Brothers loan contracted in the mid-1820s. He was president of the Bank of Buenos Aires (also known as the Banco de Descuentos) in the early 1820s and, after the institutional reform of 1826, became the first president of the Banco Nacional, a mixed-capital bank with emission and minting functions.

== Legacy ==
Contemporary and later accounts identify Aguirre as a transitional head of state at the end of the directorial period and as a key organizer of early national banking and public credit during the reform cycle of 1822–1826.

== See also ==
- List of heads of state of Argentina
