= Gervasio Antonio de Posadas =

1st Supreme Director of the United Provinces of the Río de la Plata (1757–1833)

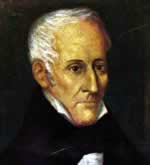

Supreme Director of the United Provinces of the Río de la Plata
- In office 31 January 1814 – 9 January 1815
- Preceded by: Second Triumvirate
- Succeeded by: Carlos María de Alvear

Triumvir of the Second Triumvirate
- In office 19 August 1813 – 31 January 1814
- Preceded by: Antonio Álvarez Jonte
- Succeeded by: Office suppressed

Personal details
- Born: 18 June 1757 Buenos Aires
- Died: 2 July 1833 (aged 76) Buenos Aires
- Profession: Lawyer

Gervasio Antonio de Posadas y Dávila (18 June 1757 – 2 July 1833) was an Argentine lawyer and statesman who served as the first Supreme Director of the United Provinces of the Río de la Plata from 31 January 1814 to 9 January 1815, after having been a member of the Second Triumvirate in 1813–1814.

== Early life and legal career ==
Posadas studied at the Franciscan convent school in Buenos Aires and later trained in law under Manuel José de Lavardén. In 1789 he was appointed escribano mayor (notary general) of the bishopric, a post he held until the events of May 1810. He briefly served as procurador (solicitor) of Buenos Aires in mid-1810.

== Political rise and the Second Triumvirate ==
On 19 August 1813 Posadas joined the Second Triumvirate, replacing Antonio Álvarez Jonte; he served until the Assembly concentrated executive power in a single person in January 1814. On 31 January 1814 he took office as Supreme Director of the United Provinces.

== Supreme Director (1814–1815) ==
=== Naval campaign and the fall of Montevideo ===
Under Posadas, the revolutionary fleet commanded by Guillermo Brown won decisive actions in 1814 (notably the Battle of Buceo), which led to the capitulation of Montevideo on 23 June 1814 and the end of royalist control of the principal naval base in the estuary.

=== Conflict with Artigas and the Federal League ===
Shortly after assuming office Posadas issued a decree on 11 February 1814 declaring José Gervasio Artigas "infamous, deprived of his posts, outside the law and an enemy of the fatherland", and offering a reward of 6,000 pesos for his capture, dead or alive. The measure deepened the conflict between the central government and the Liga Federal.

=== Administrative measures ===
On 10 September 1814 Posadas decreed the separation of the territories of Entre Ríos and Corrientes from the Buenos Aires intendancy, establishing them as provinces of the state and fixing their boundaries (including the annexation of the Misiones pueblos to Corrientes). The full text of the decree survives.

=== Appointments and organization ===
During his one-year term Posadas appointed José de San Martín Governor-Intendant of Cuyo (10 August 1814), a post from which San Martín organized the Army of the Andes. He also promoted the creation and equipping of a riverine fleet, a key factor in the 1814 campaign.

=== International context ===
In Europe Ferdinand VII of Spain was restored to the throne in 1814, returning to Madrid in May and re-establishing absolutist rule, developments that reshaped metropolitan policy toward Spanish America.

=== Resignation ===
Amid military tensions with the Ejército del Norte and intensifying internal conflict in the Littoral, Posadas resigned on 9 January 1815; he was succeeded by his nephew Carlos María de Alvear.

== Imprisonment and later life ==
After Alvear's fall in April 1815 Posadas was imprisoned and confined in multiple locations. In his Autobiografía he recalled having occupied "22 different jails" over six years before being released around mid-1821. He began drafting his memoirs in 1829; a later edition of his Memorias was published in 1920. Posadas died in Buenos Aires on 2 July 1833.

== Legacy ==
In 1879 the city of Posadas was named in his honor.

== Works ==
- Autobiografía (manuscript; excerpts published in Biblioteca de Mayo, Senate of Argentina, 1960).
- Memorias de Gervasio Antonio Posadas... (1920).
