= First Triumvirate (Argentina) =

1811–12 executive body

The First Triumvirate (Spanish: Primer Triunvirato) was the executive body of government that replaced the Junta Grande in the United Provinces of the Río de la Plata (modern-day Argentina). It started its functions on 23 September 1811, and was replaced on 8 October 1812.

== Origin ==
After the defeat of the patriotic forces at the Battle of Huaqui on 20 June 1811, the already damaged prestige of the Junta Grande received a fatal blow.

The Junta's President, Cornelio Saavedra, decided to take responsibility for the Army of the North (Spanish: Ejército del Norte) so he left office to be personally in charge of the Army. His departure gave room to the faction that supported liberal Mariano Moreno to take advantage of his absence and try to force the dissolution of the Junta.

A Triumvirate was chosen to wield the executive power. However, this Triumvirate was controlled by a Junta Conservadora (English: Conservative Junta), composed of the members of the recently dissolved Junta.

== End ==
The actions of its members were limited by successive struggles of power. With this government the morenistas successfully neutralized their opposition, but the internal struggles, the menace of an invasion from Brazil and the military misadventures of Manuel Belgrano in the north undermined their power.

José de San Martín, with the members of the Logia Lautaro (Lautaro Lodge) and the Sociedad Patriótica (Patriotic Society) which was formed by morenistas coincided on giving privilege to the organization of a liberation army and declaration of Independence. It was then when the destitution of the Triumvirate members and to return to the line of action impulsed by the Society. The Lautaro Lodge, on the other hand, mobilized its troops and the Patriotic Society recurred to public petitions and mobilization of the population.

The triumvirate was then replaced by the Second Triumvirate.

== Members ==
- Feliciano Chiclana, Juan José Paso and Manuel de Sarratea.
- Secretaries without right to vote: Bernardino Rivadavia, Julián Pérez and Vicente López y Planes.

First Triumvirate original members
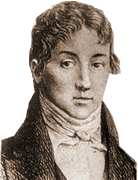
Manuel de Sarratea (1774–1849)

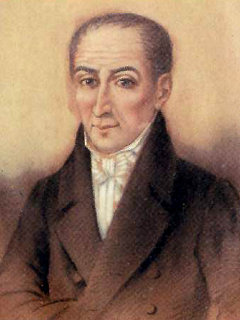
Juan José Paso (1758–1833)

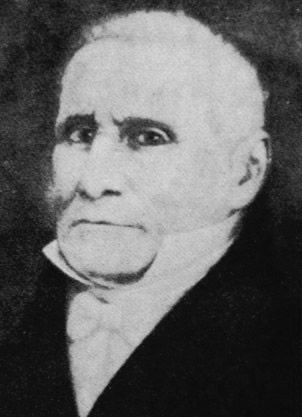
Feliciano Chiclana (1761–1826)

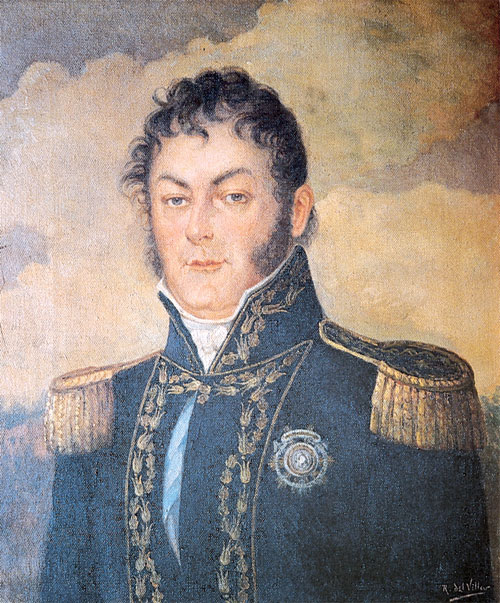
Juan Martín de Pueyrredón (1777–1850)
(replacement for Paso)

== See also ==
- 1811 Provisional Statute

== Bibliography ==
- Busaniche, José Luis (1969). Historia argentina (in Spanish). Buenos Aires: Ed. Solar.
- Lozier Almazán, Bernardo (1998). Martín de Álzaga (in Spanish). Buenos Aires: Ed. Ciudad Argentina.
- Mitre, Bartolomé (1968). Historia de San Martín y de la emancipación sudamericana (in Spanish). Buenos Aires: Ed. Eudeba.
- Segreti, Carlos S. A. (1980). La aurora de la Independencia - Memorial de la Patria (in Spanish). Buenos Aires: Ed. La Bastilla.
- Sierra, Vicente D. (1973). Historia de la Argentina (in Spanish). Buenos Aires: Ed. Garriga.
- Ternavasio, Marcela (2007). Gobernar la Revolución (in Spanish). Buenos Aires: Ed. Siglo Veintiuno.
- Bra, Gerardo. "El Motín de las Trenzas". Revista Todo es Historia (in Spanish) (187).
- Fernández, Alejandro E.; Aníbal Jáuregui; Darío Roldán. "Un golpe militar en el camino hacia la independencia". Revista Todo es Historia (in Spanish) (192).
- Heredia, Edmundo. "Expediciones reconquistadoras españolas al Río de la Plata (1811-1814)". Revista Todo es Historia (in Spanish) (201).
