= Supreme Director of the United Provinces of the Río de la Plata =

Former Argentine government position

The Supreme Director of the United Provinces of the Río de la Plata (Spanish: Director Supremo de las Provincias Unidas del Río de la Plata) was a title given to the executive officers of the United Provinces of the Río de la Plata according to the form of government established in 1814 by the Asamblea del Año XIII (Assembly of Year XIII). The supreme director was to wield power for a term of two years.

The assembly hoped to confront the royalists, who had been emboldened by internal dissension within the patriotic faction. To prevent abuses of power, the directorship would be combined with a state council of nine members and would be required to answer to a congress empowered to carry out legislation.

After the resignation of José Rondeau following the unitarian defeat at the Battle of Cepeda, the office of Supreme Director was briefly assumed by Juan Pedro Aguirre. He endorsed the Buenos Aires Cabildo to name a governor for the province of Buenos Aires as the national congress dissolved itself on 16 February 1820, effectively ending the centralism in the national government and giving way to a new federal reorganization for the country, which was immediately formalized by the Treaty of Pilar on 23 February 1820.

For the traditional liberal historiography, exemplified by Bartolomé Mitre's works, the aftermath of the dissolution of the centralist government led to the Anarquía del año 20 (Anarchy of the 1820s). Until 1826 there would not be any central authority among the provinces of Argentina.

== List of Supreme Directors ==
| Took office | Left office | Supreme Director | Ref. |
|---|---|---|---|
| January 31, 1814 | January 15, 1815 | Gervasio Antonio de Posadas | |
| January 15, 1815 | April 15, 1815 | Carlos María de Alvear | |
| April 18, 1815 | April 20, 1815 | Juan José Viamonte | |
| April 20, 1815 | April 20, 1815 | José Rondeau | |
| April 20, 1815 | April 17, 1816 | Ignacio Álvarez Thomas | |
| April 17, 1816 | July 12, 1816 | Antonio González de Balcarce | |
| May 3, 1816 | June 9, 1819 | Juan Martín de Pueyrredón | |
| June 9, 1819 | February 11, 1820 | José Rondeau | |
| February 11, 1820 | February 16, 1820 | Juan Pedro Aguirre | |

== See also ==
- List of heads of state of Argentina
- President of Argentina
