= Carlos María de Alvear =

2nd Supreme Director of the United Provinces of the Río de la Plata

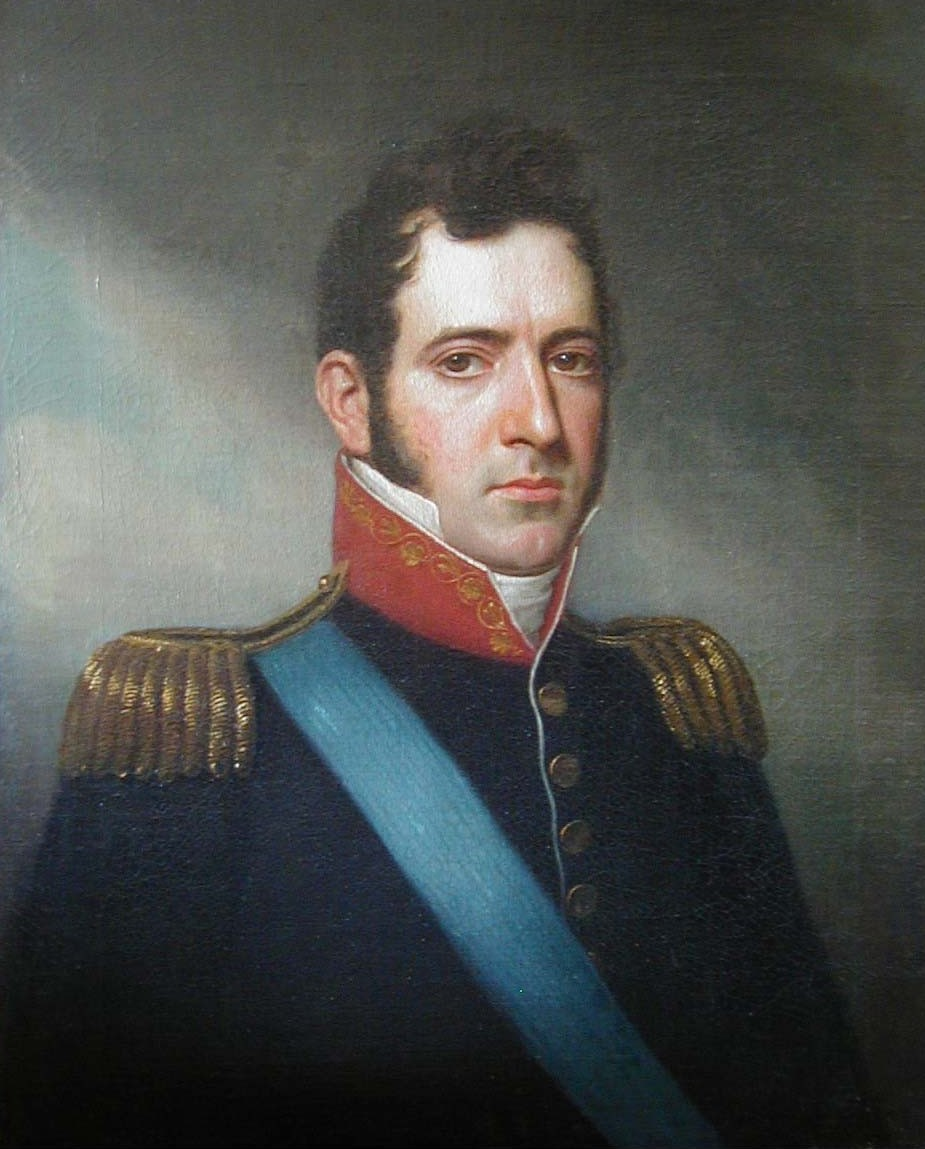
- Carlos María de Alvear (1860), in a portrait by an unknown artist

Supreme Director of the United Provinces of the Río de la Plata
- In office 9 January 1815 – 15 April 1815
- Preceded by: Gervasio Antonio de Posadas
- Succeeded by: Ignacio Álvarez Thomas (interim)

Personal details
- Born: Carlos Antonio del Santo Ángel Guardián de Alvear y Balbastro; 25 October 1789 Santo Ángel (present-day Santo Ângelo), Rio Grande do Sul
- Died: 3 November 1852 (aged 63) New York City, United States
- Resting place: La Recoleta Cemetery, Buenos Aires
- Party: Unitarian Party
- Other political affiliations: Lautaro Lodge
- Spouse: María del Carmen Sáenz de la Quintanilla
- Children: María Carlota; Emilio Marcelo; Camilio Urbelino; Carlos F.; Torcuato Antonio; Joaquina del Carmen; Virginia Mercedes; Diego; Juan Nepomuceno; León Gabino
- Profession: Soldier, Politician

Carlos María de Alvear (25 October 1789 – 3 November 1852) was an Argentine soldier, statesman and diplomat who served as the second Supreme Director of the United Provinces of the Río de la Plata from 9 January to 15 April 1815. He played a leading role in the capitulation of royalist-held Montevideo in June 1814 and later commanded the republican army in the Cisplatine War, winning the Battle of Ituzaingó (20 February 1827).

== Early life ==
Alvear was born in Santo Ángel (today Santo Ângelo, Brazil), son of Spanish naval officer Diego de Alvear y Ponce de León and María Balbastro. An authority record of the Archivo General de la Nación gives his full baptismal name as Carlos Antonio José Gabino del Ángel de la Guarda Alvear.

In 1804 he travelled with his family to Spain in a four-frigate convoy. On 5 October 1804, off Cape Santa María, a British squadron intercepted the Spanish ships; the frigate Nuestra Señora de las Mercedes exploded during the action, killing Alvear’s mother and siblings. Contemporary and later accounts note that Carlos, then a teenager, was aboard the flagship Medea with his father and witnessed the explosion.

== War of Independence ==
After service in Spain during the Peninsular War, Alvear went to Buenos Aires with other officers in 1812. The National Historical Museum notes his participation among the officers associated with the so-called Lautaro Lodge, a secret society that supported the revolutionary government.

He was active in operations around Montevideo. Following decisive naval victories by Guillermo Brown in May 1814, negotiations and military pressure led to the capitulation of Montevideo in late June; Alvear entered the city with the besieging army on 23 June 1814.

== Supreme Director (1815) ==
On 9 January 1815 the Assembly chose Alvear as Supreme Director; he resigned in mid-April amid military unrest and political opposition. Archival research compiled by Archontology indicates that a provisional executive named by the Assembly did not take office and that the directorship remained vacant until Ignacio Álvarez Thomas assumed as interim Director on 6 May 1815.

== Exile and return ==
After resigning, Alvear left the country and lived in Brazil and the Banda Oriental before returning in the early 1820s.

== Minister of War and the Cisplatine War ==
In 1826 President Bernardino Rivadavia appointed Alvear Minister of War and Navy and shortly thereafter general-in-chief in the war against the Empire of Brazil. On 20 February 1827 he commanded the United Provinces’ army to victory at Ituzaingó, the largest engagement of the war.

== Diplomatic career and later life ==
Alvear undertook diplomatic missions to Europe and the United States. He presented his credentials at Washington on 11 October 1824 as minister plenipotentiary, holding interviews with President James Monroe; scholarship has examined his role within the diplomatic context surrounding the later Monroe Doctrine. He later served again as Argentina’s minister to the United States under Juan Manuel de Rosas. Alvear died in New York City on 3 November 1852 and was buried at La Recoleta Cemetery in Buenos Aires.

== Legacy ==
Assessments of Alvear have varied widely in Argentine historiography, from severe criticism of his brief directorship to recognition of his military leadership during the Cisplatine War.
