= Juan Martín de Pueyrredón =

Argentine general and politician (1777–1850)

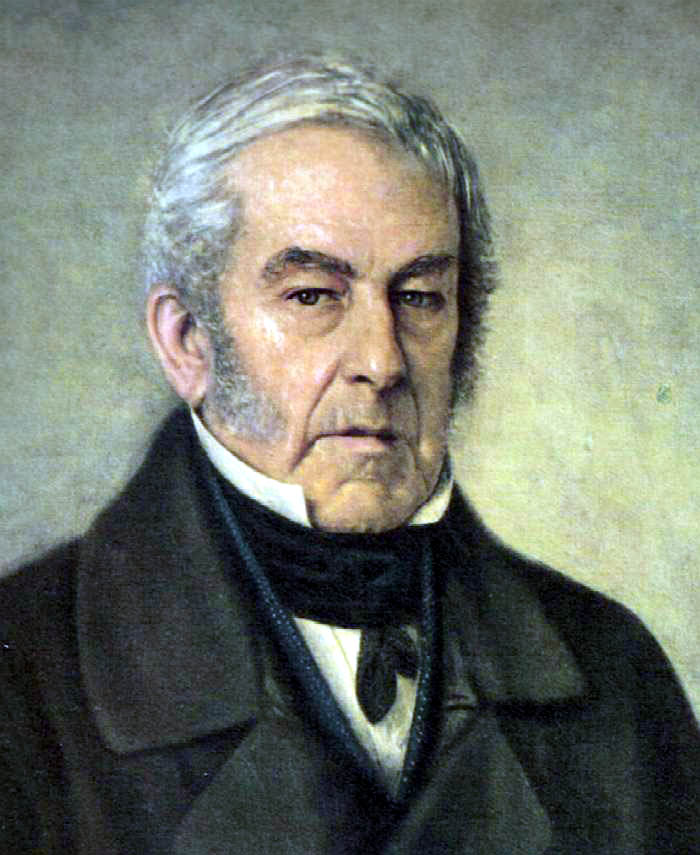
- Portrait of Pueyrredón, 1849

Supreme Director of the United Provinces of the Río de la Plata
- In office 9 July 1816 – 9 June 1819
- Preceded by: Antonio González de Balcarce
- Succeeded by: José Rondeau

Personal details
- Born: 18 December 1777 Buenos Aires
- Died: 13 March 1850 (aged 72) San Isidro
- Party: Unitarian Party
- Profession: Military officer; politician
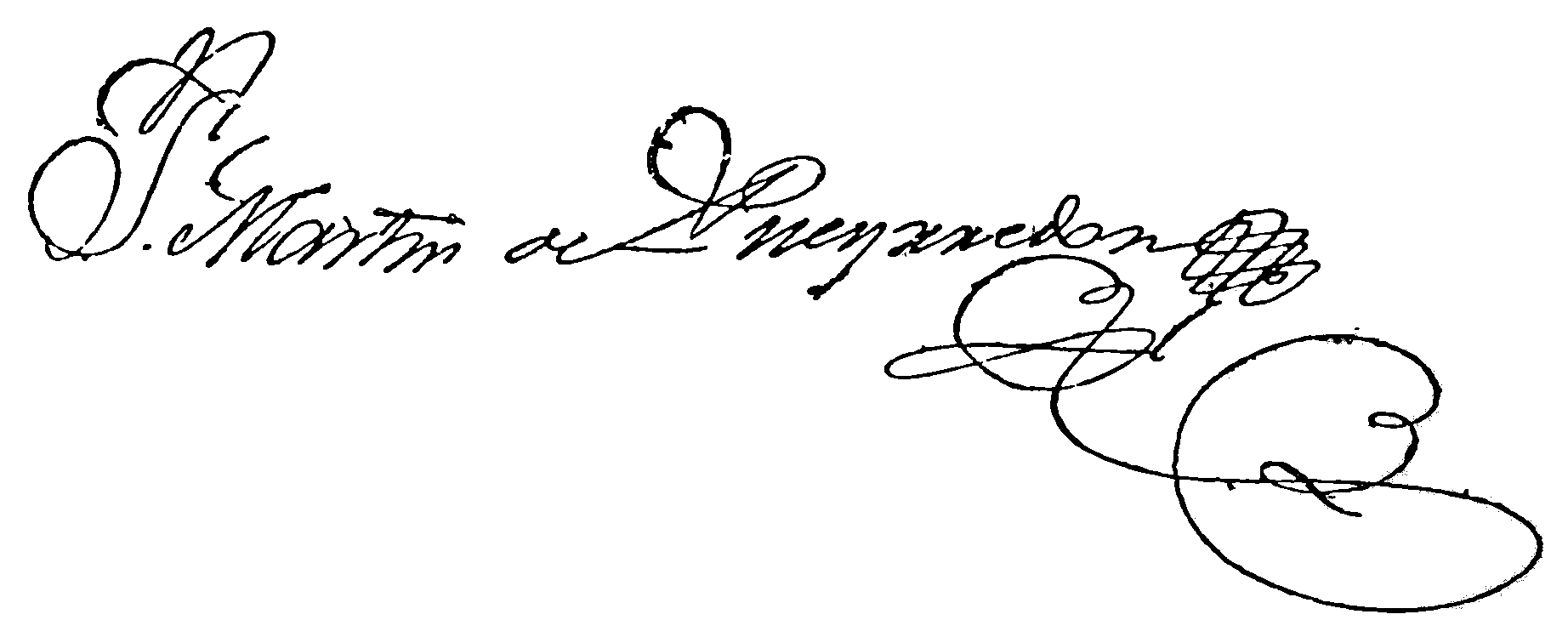
- Signature

Juan Martín de Pueyrredón y O'Dogan (December 18, 1777 – March 13, 1850) was an Argentine general and politician of the early 19th century. He was appointed Supreme Director of the United Provinces of the Río de la Plata after the Argentine Declaration of Independence.

== Biography ==
=== Early life ===
Pueyrredón was born in Buenos Aires, the fifth of eight sons of Juan Martín de Pueyrredón y Labroucherie, and his wife, María Rita Damasia O'Doggan y Soria. Pueyrredon's father was a French merchant who established himself in Cádiz with his brother, and later in Buenos Aires, where he married his wife, who was of Spanish and partial Irish descent. He was educated at the Royal College until the death of his father in 1791. María became the head of the family, assisted by Anselmo Sáenz Valiente in business, and withdrew Juan Martín from his studies at the age of 14. He then moved to live with a relative in Cádiz, Spain to learn about commerce. His first business took him to Madrid and France. He returned briefly to Buenos Aires to deal with his father's will, and married his cousin Dolores Pueyrredón, daughter of Diego de Pueyrredón y Labrucherie and Maman Mairoluo, in Spain in 1803. They returned to Buenos Aires, but Dolores miscarried during the trip. Pueyrredón thought of returning to Spain with her, hoping to restore her health by visiting her family, but she miscarried again and her health worsened, until she died in May 1805.

=== British invasions ===
Buenos Aires was invaded by British forces in 1806, during the first of two British invasions of the Río de la Plata. Pueyrredón was among the criollos who did not believe that the British would help them to become independent from Spain. He moved to Montevideo and got an interview with governor Pascual Ruiz Huidobro. Huidobro authorized him to organize a resistance, so he returned to Buenos Aires and secretly prepared an army at the Perdriel ranch. The British, however, discovered it and defeated the half-prepared army. Pueyrredón escaped to Colonia del Sacramento and joined Santiago de Liniers, whose army would eventually defeat the British.

In 1807, he was sent as representative of Buenos Aires to Spain again, but returned in 1809 via Brazil to Buenos Aires, where he subsequently participated in the independentist movement. After the May Revolution of 1810, which gave birth to the first local government junta, he was appointed governor of Córdoba, and in 1812 he became the leader of the independent forces and a member of the short-lived First Triumvirate. From 1812 to 1815, he was exiled in San Luis.

=== Supreme director ===
In 1816, Pueyrredón was elected Supreme Director of the United Provinces of the Río de la Plata. He strongly supported José de San Martín's military campaign in Chile, and also founded the first national bank of Argentina and the national mint. After the declaration of a Unitarian constitution, revolts forced him to resign as Supreme Director in 1819 and go into exile in Montevideo. He subsequently played a very small role in politics, most notably serving in 1829 as a mediator between Juan Manuel de Rosas and Juan Lavalle. He died in retirement on his ranch in San Isidro, Buenos Aires.

== Personal life ==
During his time in San Luis, Pueyrredón had an illegitimate daughter, Virginia, with Juana Sánchez. Another daughter of him, María de los Angeles Pueyrredón (1798-1863), married Antonio Antonini Tagliafico (ca. 1791-1865, son of the revolutionary Santiago Antonini (1768-1831)) on March 15, 1815, at the Iglesia de la Merced, witnessed by General D. Juan Martín de Pueyrredón and Doña Manuela Garayo.

In 1815, at the age of 39, he married his 14-year-old second wife María Calixta Tellechea y Caviedes; Rivadavia, Pueyrredón and Chiclana of the First Triumvirate had had her father executed three years before as a member of the royalist conspiracy of Martín de Alzaga. The Pueyrredóns' only male child and one daughter, Virginia Pueyrredon, married to Cnel. Jose Maria Pelliza Gomez de Rospigliosi in San Isidro. Prilidiano was born in Buenos Aires on January 24, 1823. He became a civil engineer and artist, and has been called the first Argentine painter; he had no children. From 1835 to 1849, Pueyrredón and his family lived in Europe.

== Bibliography ==
- Luna, Félix (1999). Grandes protagonistas de la historia argentina: Juan Martín de Pueyrredón (in Spanish). Buenos Aires: Editorial Planeta. ISBN 950-49-0469-6.
