= Lautaro Lodge =

Masonic lodge

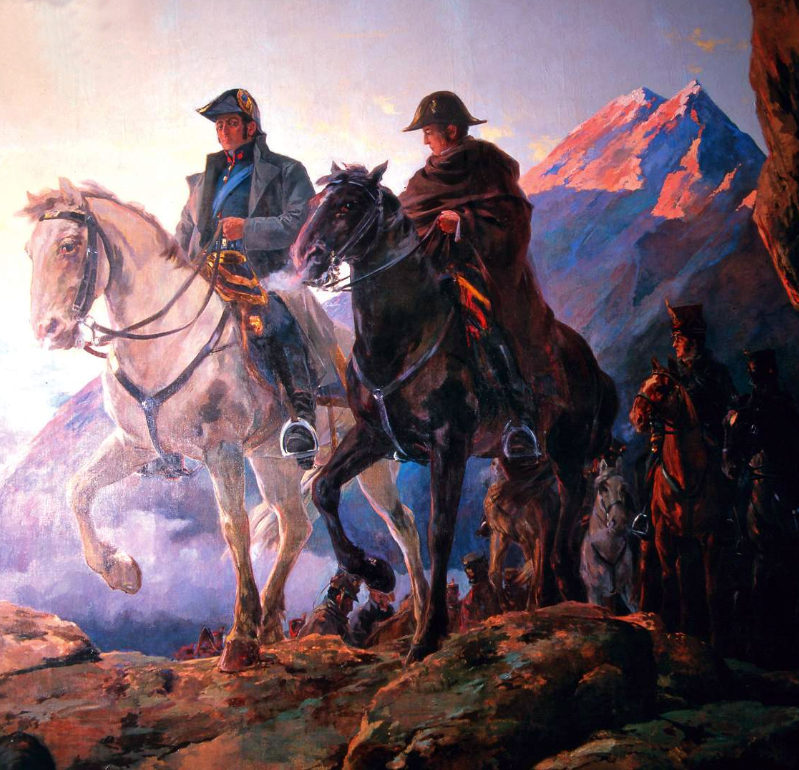
José de San Martín and Bernardo O'Higgins, members of the Lautaro Lodge, during the Crossing of the Andes, which would allow the consolidation of the independence of the new republics of the Southern Cone

The Lautaro Lodge (Spanish: Logia Lautaro) was a revolutionary masonic lodge active in Latin American politics in the 19th century. It was initially known as the Lodge of Rational Knights (Spanish: Logia de los Caballeros Racionales). Its initial purposes were to apply the goals of the Spanish Enlightenment, and when Spain began the Absolutist Restoration they promoted instead the emancipation of the South American colonies.

== Creation in Europe ==
It was for many years believed to have been founded as an extension of the British lodge "The Great American Reunion", created by Venezuelan revolutionary Francisco de Miranda. However, recent research suggests that the Lodge was founded in Cádiz, Spain, and that Miranda was not amongst its founders, as he himself was living in Paris at the time, from where he returned to London in January 1798. As with other secret societies, such details are difficult to investigate by historians, given the secrecy of their activities. Both lodges had just a superficial compromise with freemasonry, taking advantage of their secret societies merely as a tool to promote liberal agendas, evading punishment from absolutist governments of the time.

== Buenos Aires ==
A number of officers from the Peninsular War, such as José de San Martín, Carlos María de Alvear, José Matías Zapiola, Francisco Chilavert and Eduardo Kailitz left Cádiz and moved to Buenos Aires. They began to organise a secret lodge, similar to the one in Cádiz. There were other secret lodges already working in Buenos Aires: the anglophile lodges "Hiram sons" and "Southern Star", and the "Patriotic Society" that united the former supporters of Mariano Moreno. This last lodge, opposed to the first two ones, was integrated into the new one created by the Spanish generals.

== Name ==
Although the lodge is most commonly known as "Lautaro", it did not employ that name during all of its existence. The name made reference to Mapuche leader Lautaro, which made sense in Santiago de Chile in the 1817–1820 period, but not in Buenos Aires in 1812 and much less in Europe. Historian Vicente Fidel López points that "Lautaro" was really a masonic code meaning "Expedition to Chile", but similarly, Chile was not a military target for Buenos Aires in 1812. By that point, Chile was still in the Patria Vieja period, and would not fall into royalist control until the 1814 Disaster of Rancagua. Although the secrecy makes difficult to investigate the purposes or even the name, Alcibíades Lappas considers instead that the lodge was named "Lodge of Rational Knights" in 1812, just like the Cádiz one, and that San Martín renamed it "Lautaro" when he recreated it in 1815, after the fall of Alvear.
