= Cabildo of Buenos Aires =

- Cabildo de Buenos Aires
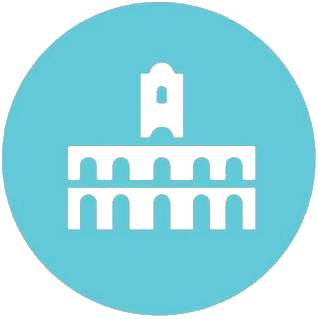

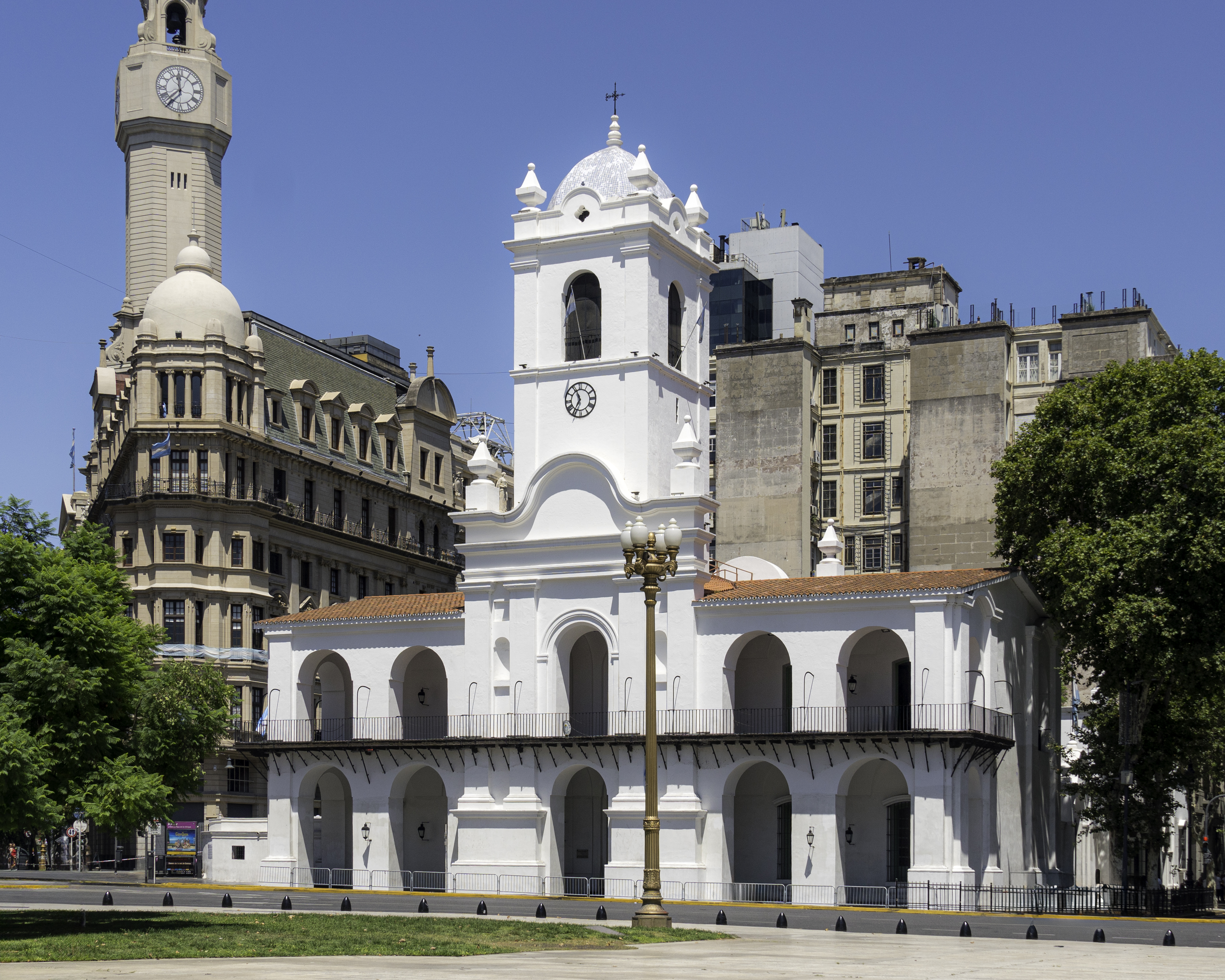
- The east façade opposite Plaza de Mayo
- Interactive map of the Cabildo of Buenos Aires area
- Former names: Cabildo de la ciudad de la Trinidad y Puerto de Santa María de Buenos Aires

General information
- Type: Historic museum
- Architectural style: Baroque
- Location: Bolívar 65, Buenos Aires, Argentina
- Coordinates: 34°36′32″S 58°22′25″W
- Completed: 1748
- Renovated: 1880, 1940
- Demolished: 1889, 1931
- Owner: Government of Argentina

Design and construction
- Architects: Andrea Bianchi (original building, 1748); Pedro Benoit (refurbishment, 1879); Mario Buschiazzo (reconstruction, 1940)

Website
- cabildonacional.cultura.gob.ar

National Historic Monument of Argentina
- Designated: 1933

The Cabildo of Buenos Aires (Spanish: Cabildo de Buenos Aires) is the public building in the city of Buenos Aires, Argentina, that was used as a seat of the town council during the colonial era and the government house of the Viceroyalty of the Río de la Plata.

The building was also seat of other institutions such as the Royal Audience of Buenos Aires, the highest court for appeal of second instance in the territory, operated from April 6, 1661 to January 23, 1812, when it was replaced by an Appeals Chamber. On September 13, 1810, the Primera Junta created the Public Library of Buenos Aires, being the Cabildo its first location for two years. The institution that was housed for the longest in the building was the Buenos Aires prison, from 1608 to 1877, when the prisoners were transferred to the new National Penitentiary on Las Heras Street, when it was inaugurated.

The Cabildo was declared National Historic Monument in 1933 and was opened to public as a museum in 1938.

== History ==
=== First construction ===
Mayor Manuel de Frías proposed the building of the cabildo in what is now the Plaza de Mayo on March 3, 1608, since the government of the city lacked such a building. Its construction was financed with taxes from the port of Buenos Aires, the building was finished in 1610 but was soon found to be too small and had to be expanded.

The construction of the two humble rooms (the Chapter House and the Prison) was in charge of the builder Juan Méndez, while Hernando de la Cueva was in charge of the braces, Pedro Ramírez of the doors and windows, Hernando Álvarez of the plastering and whitewashing. and some Brazilian roof weavers.

In 1612 the works on the Cabildo were completed, which facilities would later be rented. After two years, and due to the number of prisoners housed, the Cabildo became small and had to be used entirely as a prison, so the meetings of authorities were held in the governor's house and later in the fort.

Because of the lack of maintenance, the building soon fell into deterioration. The original Cabildo began to collapse in 1632, so the construction of a new one was undertaken, which only began in 1635 and lasted for more than five years due to lack of funds. In May 1682, the authorities proposed the construction of a two-floor building, but the project did not progress. As the population began to grow, the building could not hold such a number of people.

=== Second construction ===
A project by engineer Domingo Petrarca in 1722 was rejected considering it too expensive. On July 23, 1725, construction of the new building began, according to plans by the Jesuit architects Giovanni Battista Primoli and Andrea Bianchi. Bianchi was responsible for the design of the most notable part: the facade. However the construction was postponed with the departure of the architects to the city of Córdoba in 1728, where they took over works on the Cathedral. Work on the Cabildo was restarted in 1731, by Miguel Acosta and Julián Preciado. In August 1731 the works were restarted, which were suspended again in 1732 due to lack of budget. Thus, the building was handed over for use in 1748, and the tower was added in 1773, although according to other sources, it could have been built in 1764.

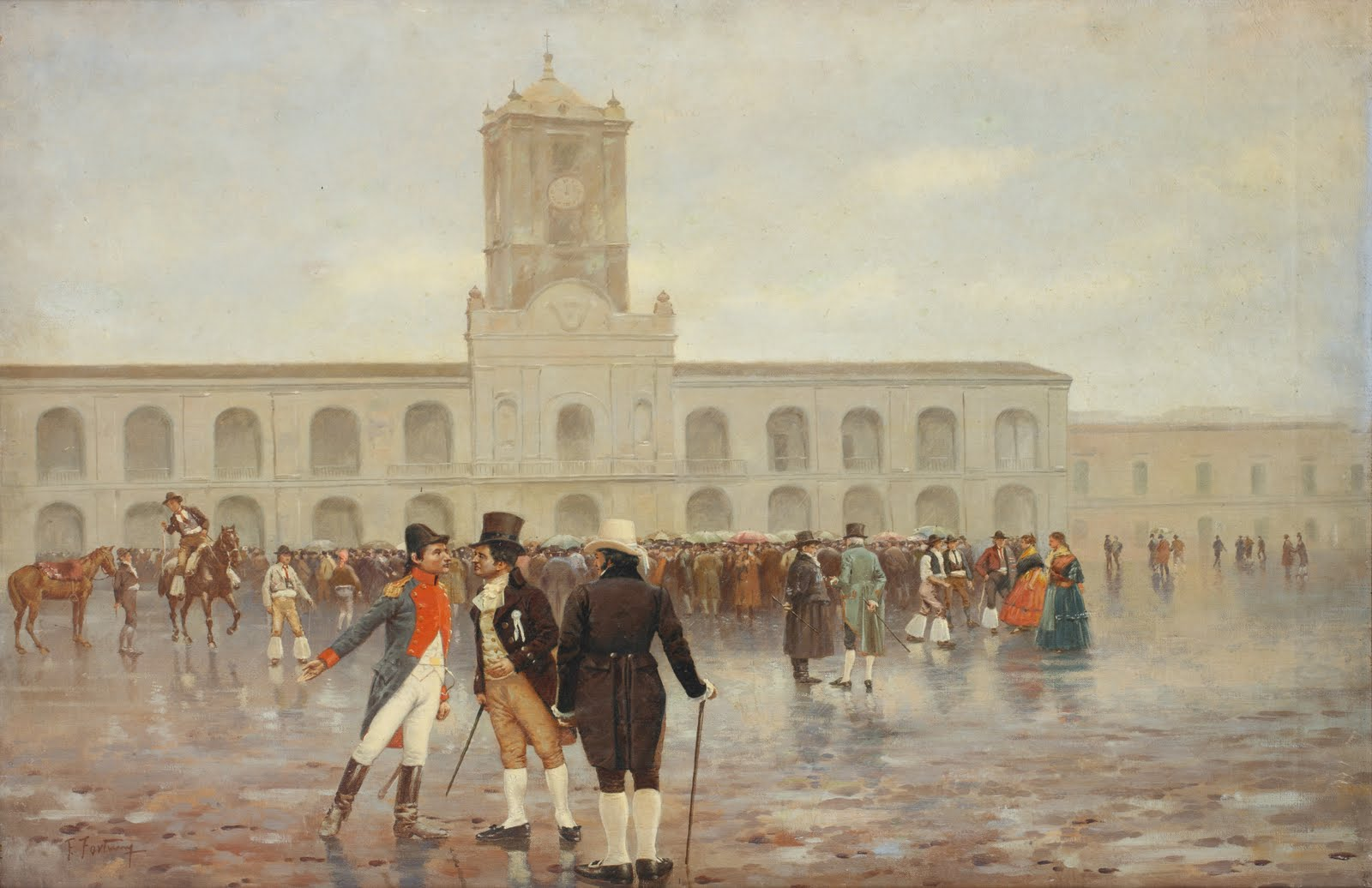
The Cabildo depicted on The May Revolution, oil painting by Francisco Fortuny

After the May Revolution in 1810, when the building served as seat for the congressmen that established the first Argentine government, the cabildo as a political institution continued operating until 1821, when it was dissolved. After that, the historic building continued operating as an administrative office. In 1860, the clock on the tower was replaced by one acquired from English manaufacturer Thwaites & Reed, while the original clock was moved to the Iglesia de Balvanera also in Buenos Aires.

In 1879, the project advanced to install the Civil Chamber in the old building, since the Judiciary did not yet have its own building. Architect Pedro Benoit planned a total renovation that included the elevation of the tower (ten meters) and placing a tiled dome in Nordic style. Colonial red tiles were removed from the roof while the balconies were decorated with balustrades. The entire facade was refurbished to make it look in Italian style. The new Cabildo facade was finished in 1880.

=== Demolition and rebuilding ===
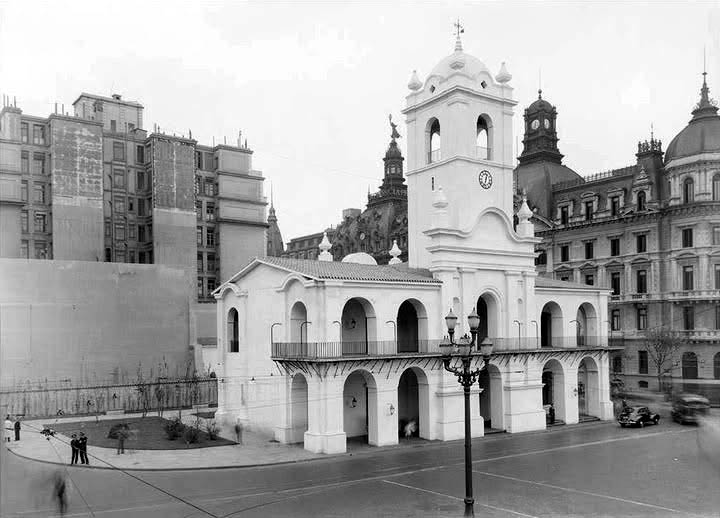
Cabildo in 1940, when the reconstruction projected by Mario Buschiazzo finished

In 1889, due to the opening of Avenida de Mayo, three arches on the north side of the building were demolished, with works carried out by architect Juan Antonio Buschiazzo. The tower built by Benoit was also demolished alleging that its excessive weight endangered the stability of the construction. In this way the building lost its frontal symmetry, until in August 1931, when José Félix Uriburu was de facto president, the other three arches on the south side were demolished to harmonize the building with the Julio A. Roca street, despite the widespread protests. Only five of the original arches remained.

The Cabildo was declared National Historic Monument by Law 11,688 in May 1933

Between 1939 and 1940, the architect Mario Buschiazzo reconstructed the colonial features of the Cabildo using various original documents. The tower, the red tiles, the iron bars on the windows and the wooden windows and doors were all reinstalled, using replicas. The last stage of the reconstruction was carried out by architect Alejandro Bustillo. The Cabildo was reinaugurated in October 1940.

=== Museum ===
In 1938, the Cabildo was opened as a museum. Currently named "National Museum of the Cabildo and the May Revolution" (Spanish: Museo Nacional del Cabildo y la Revolución de Mayo), objects in exhibition include paintings, artifacts, clothes, and jewelry of the 18th century. The courtyard (patio) of the cabildo still has its 1835 ornamental water well (aljibe).

== Galleries ==
=== Historical images ===
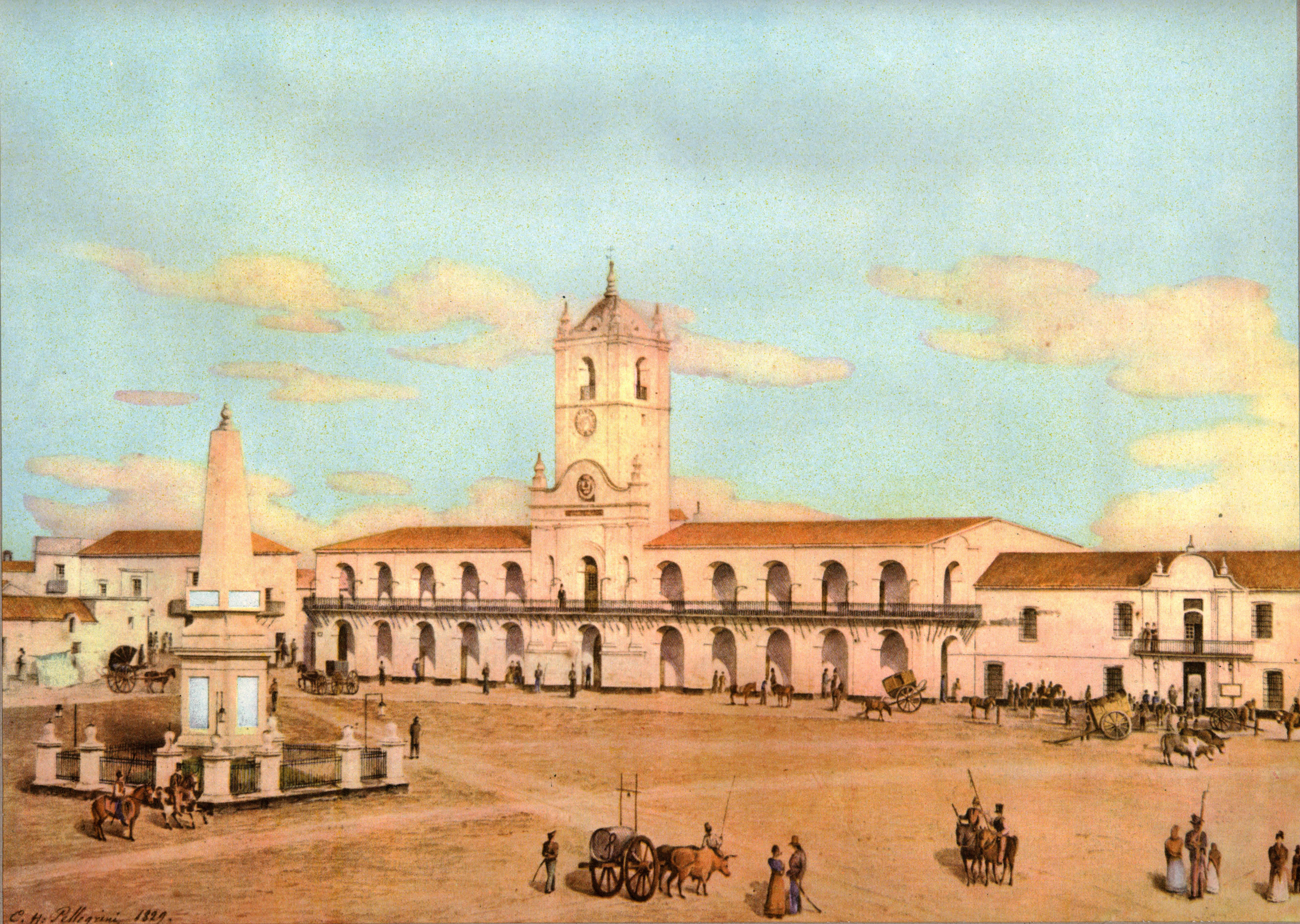
Painting by Charles Pellegrini, 1829

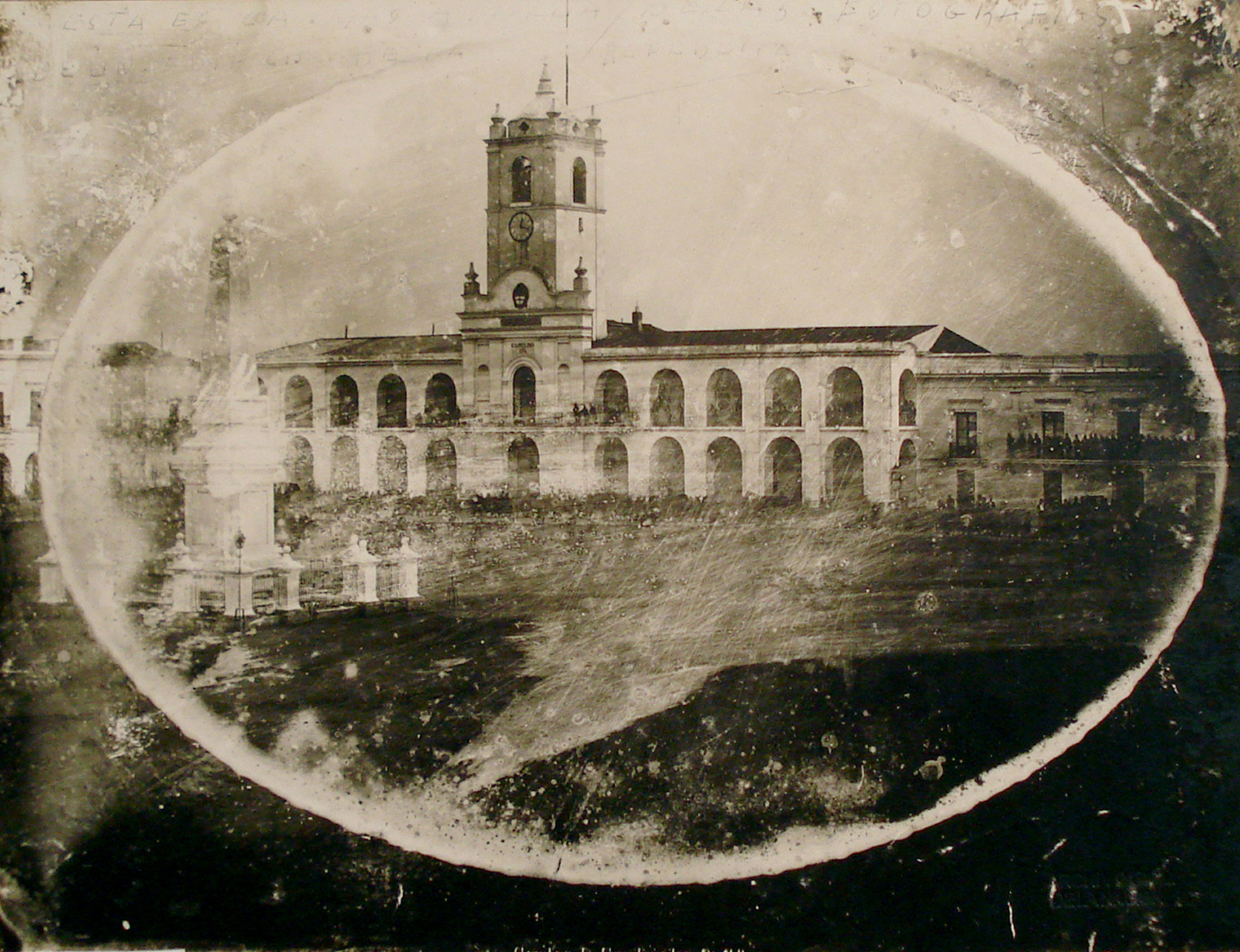
First photograph, c. 1852

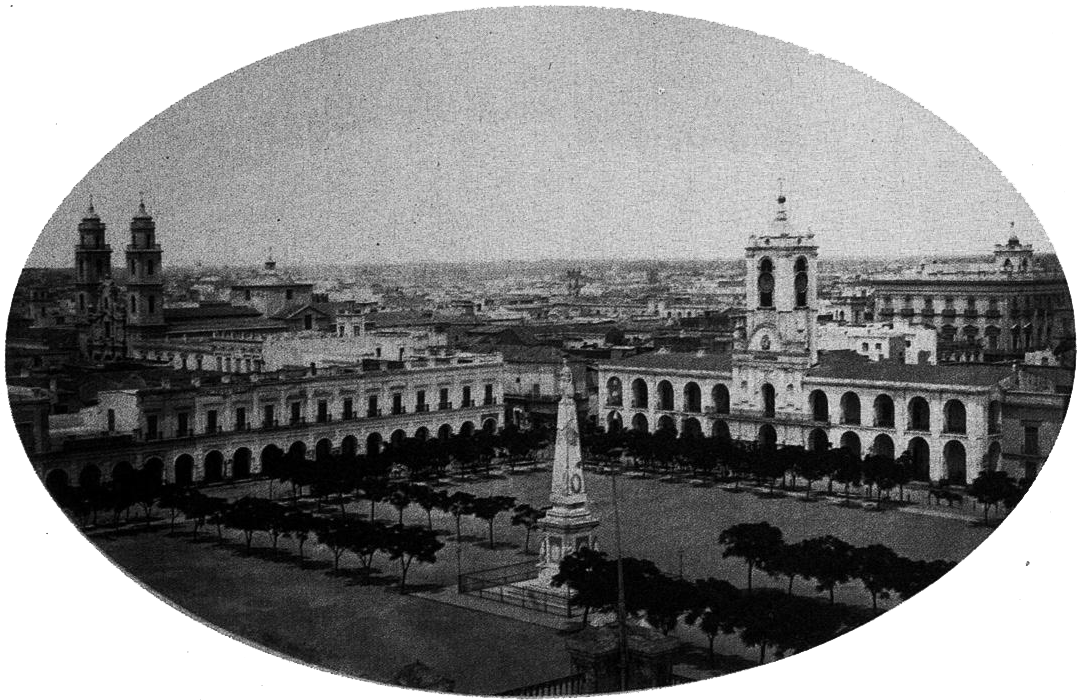
1867 (right)

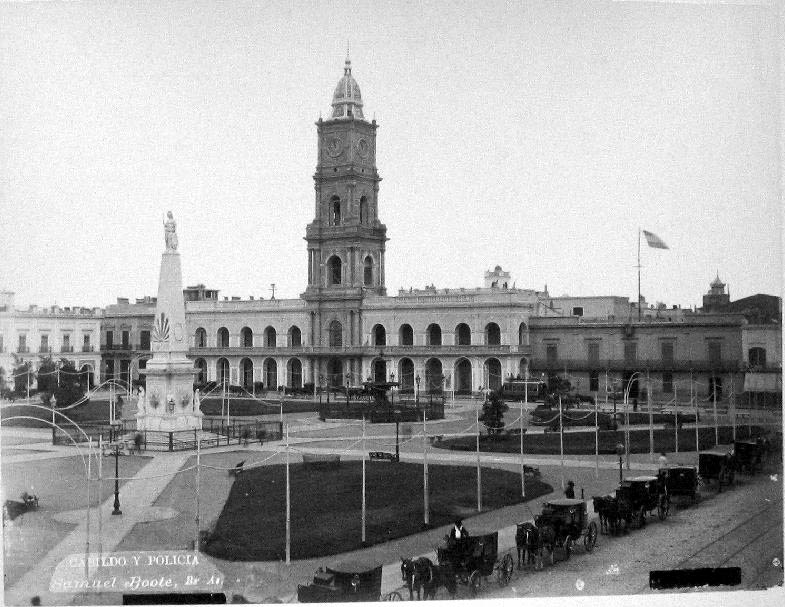
After the refurbishments of 1879

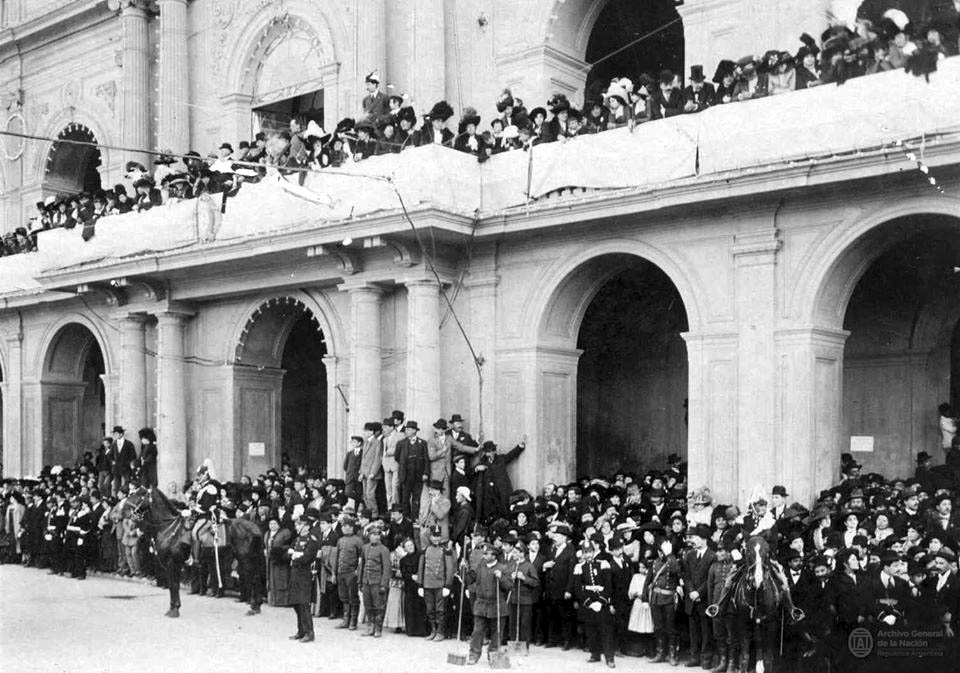
During the Centennial of Argentina

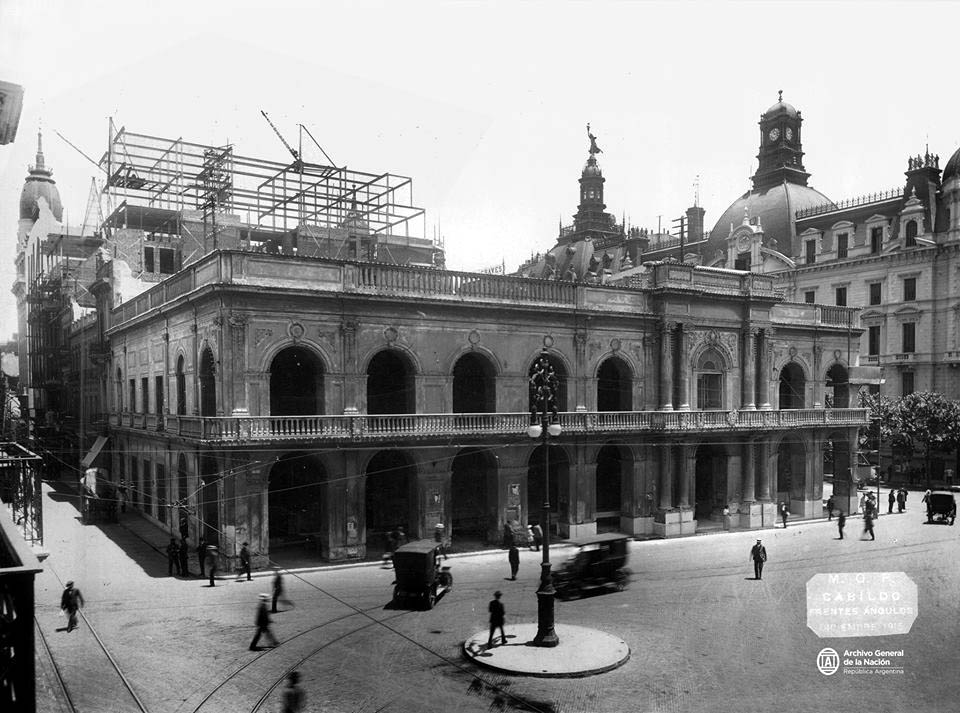
In 1915, with north arcs demolished

=== Modern images ===
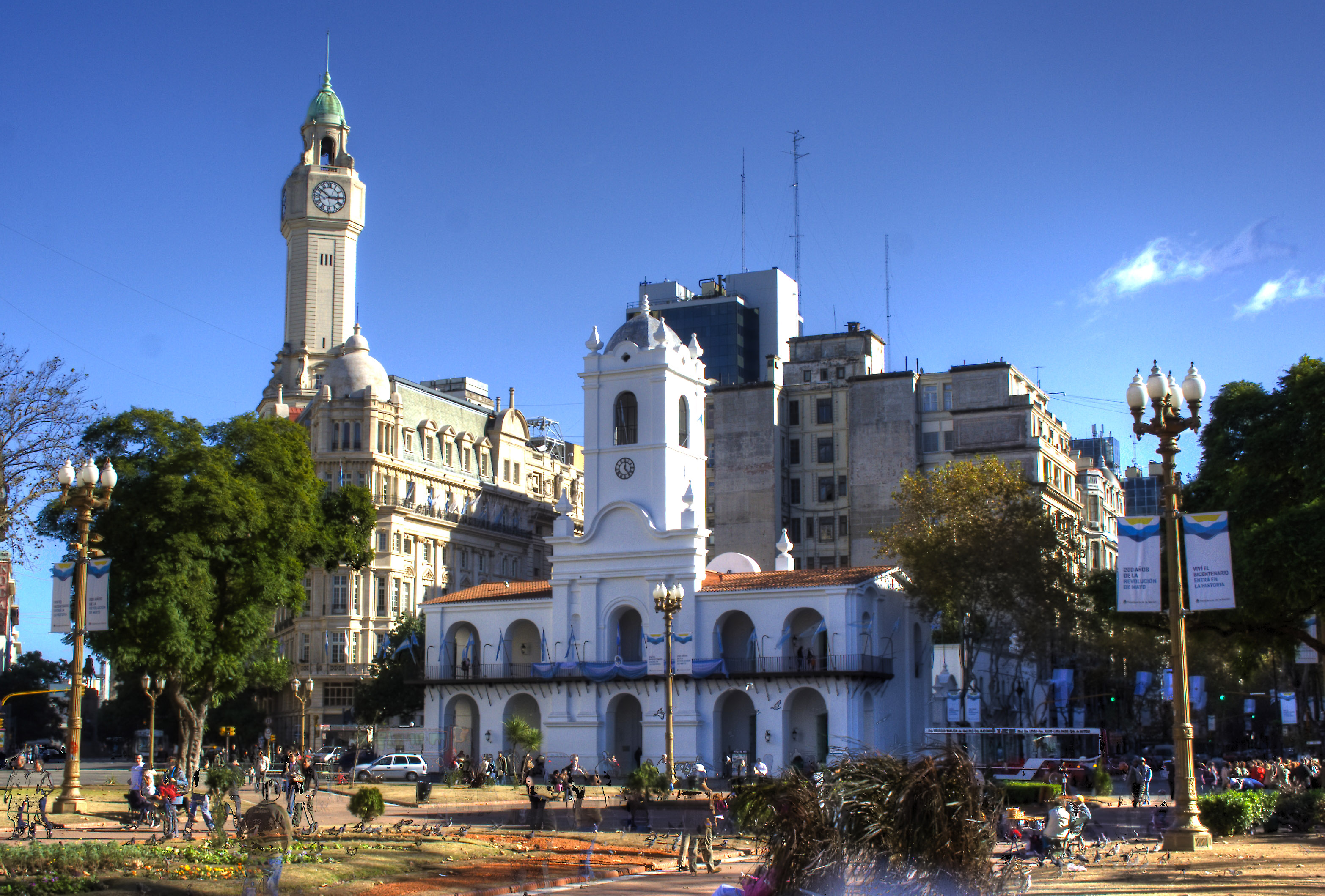
View from the Plaza de Mayo

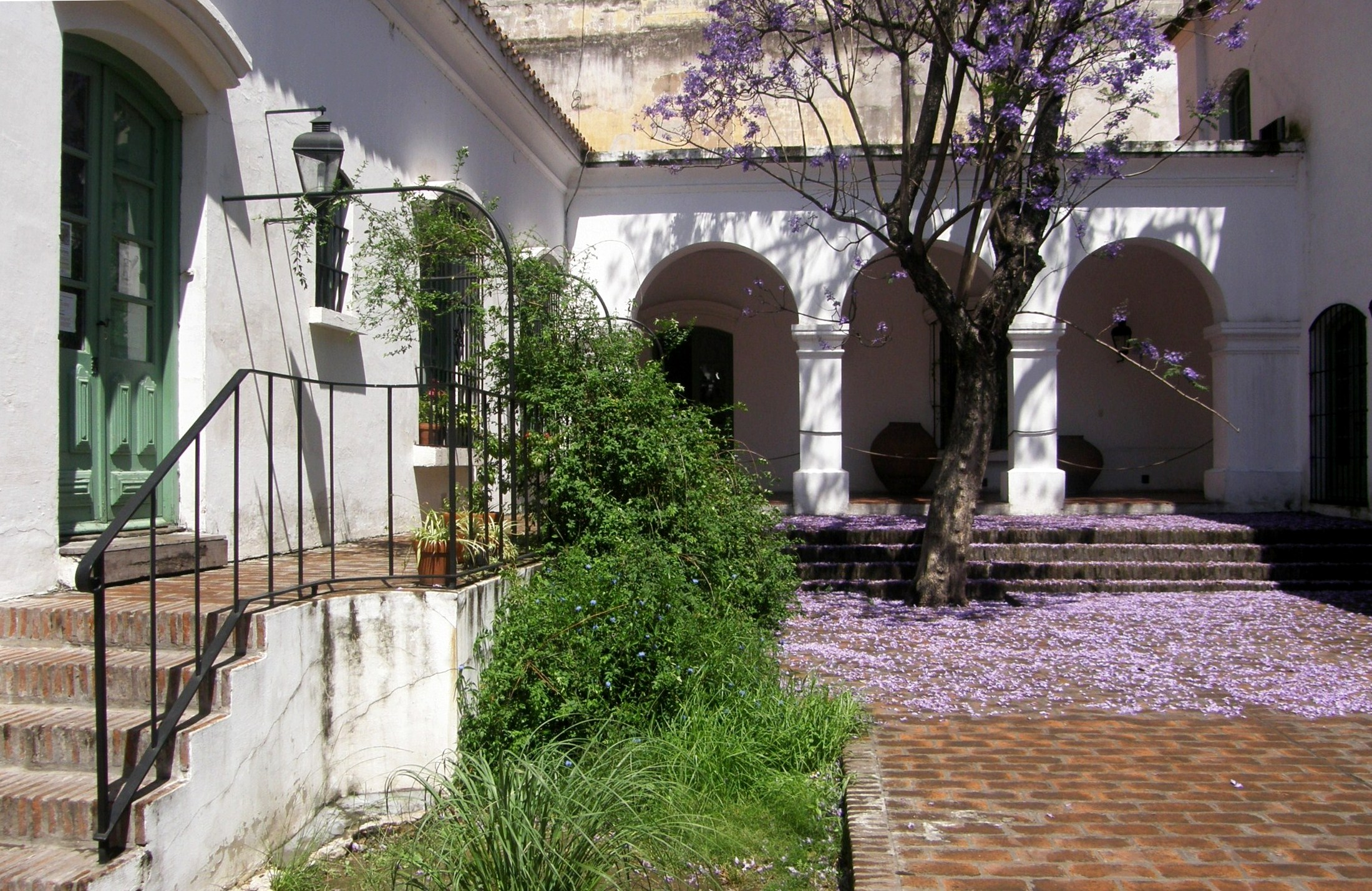
Patio

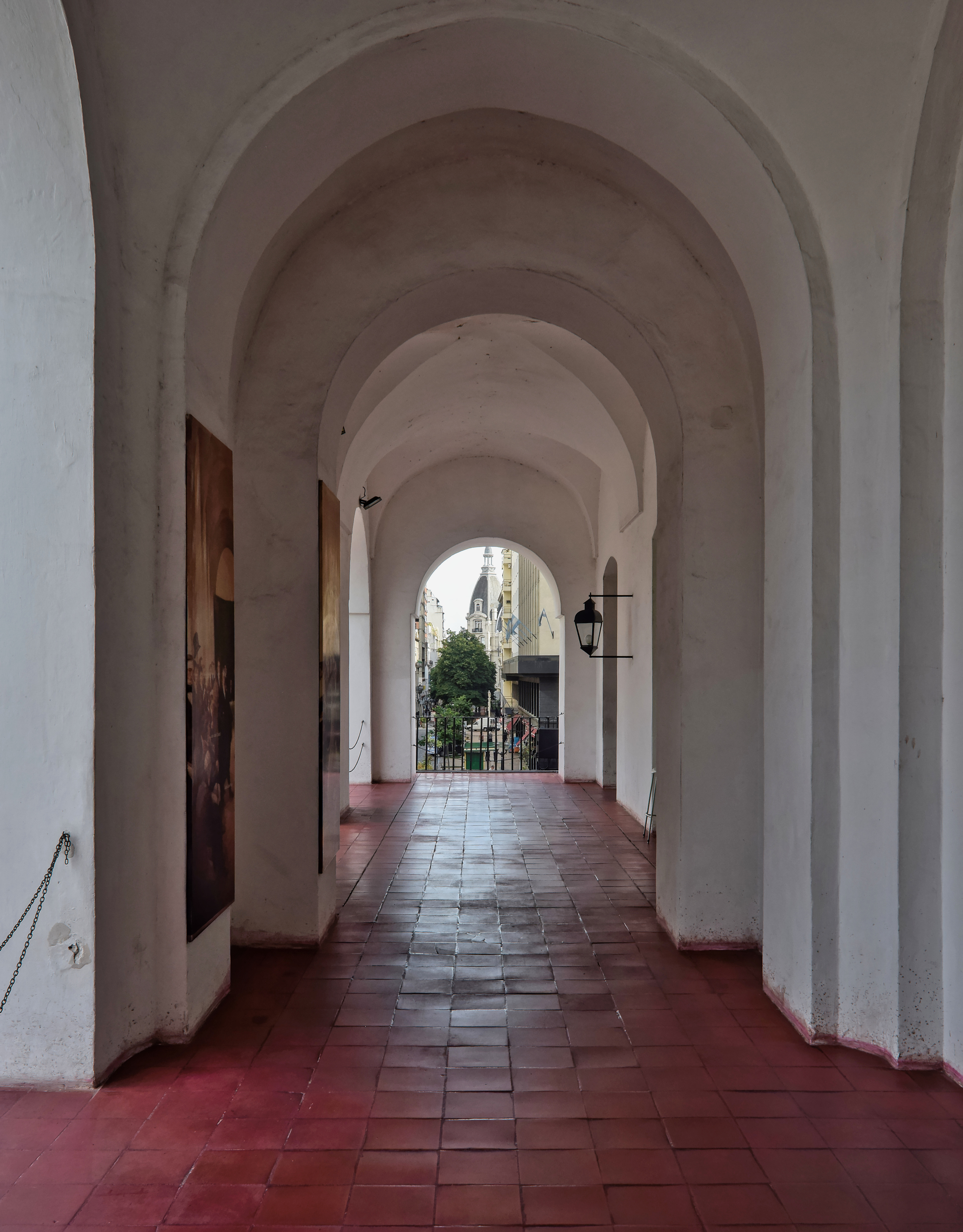
Corridor

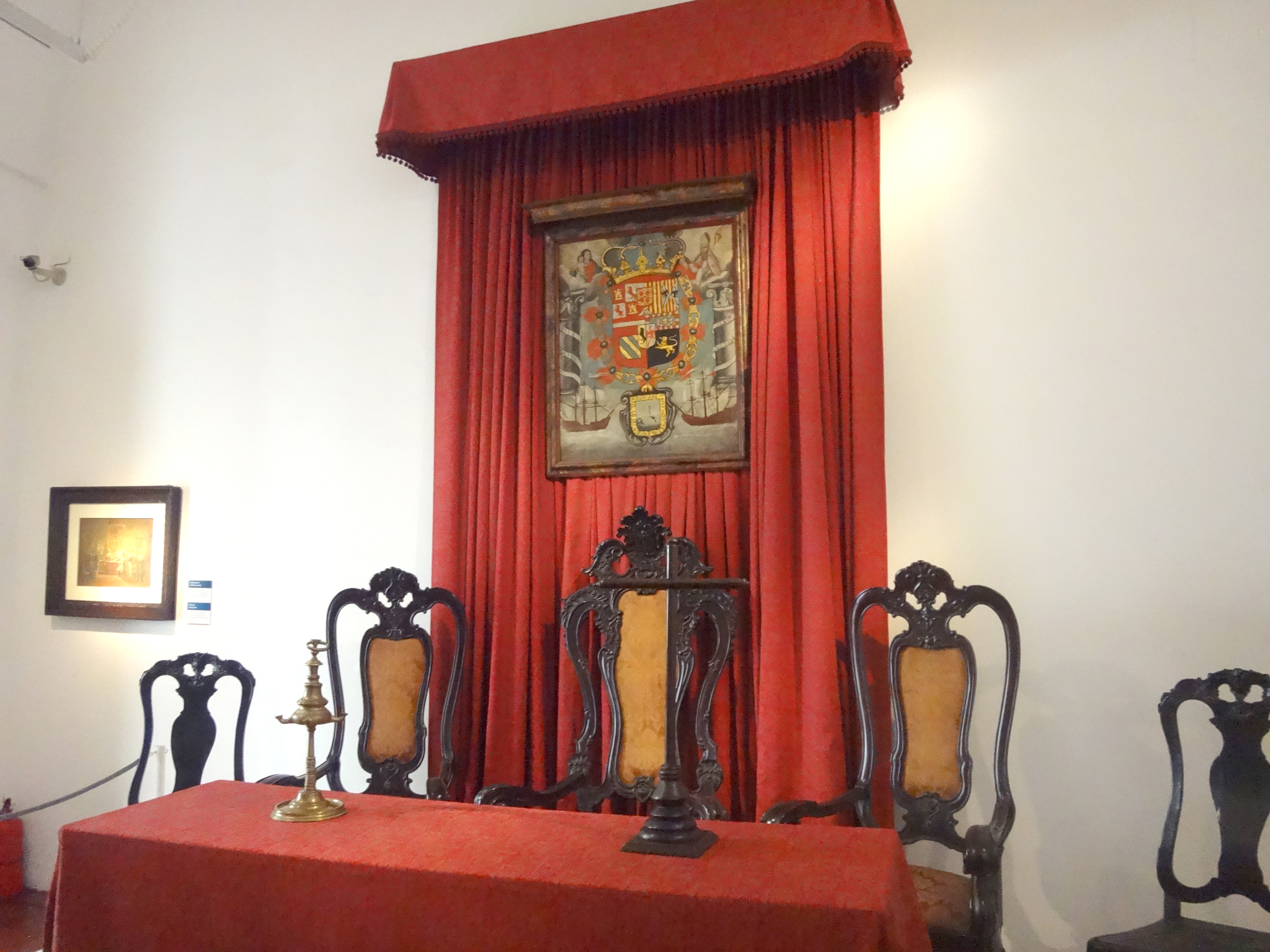
Room

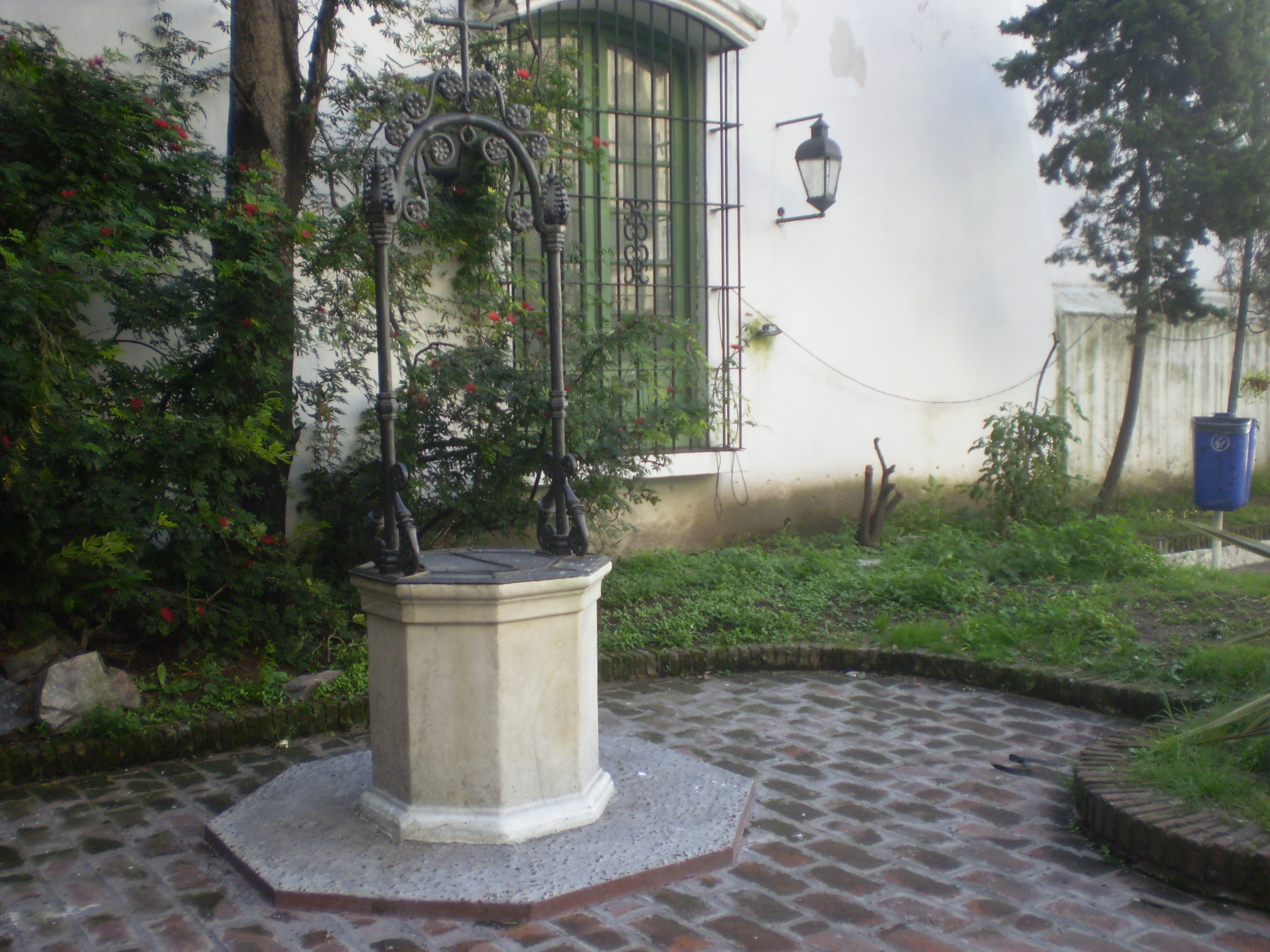
Aljibe

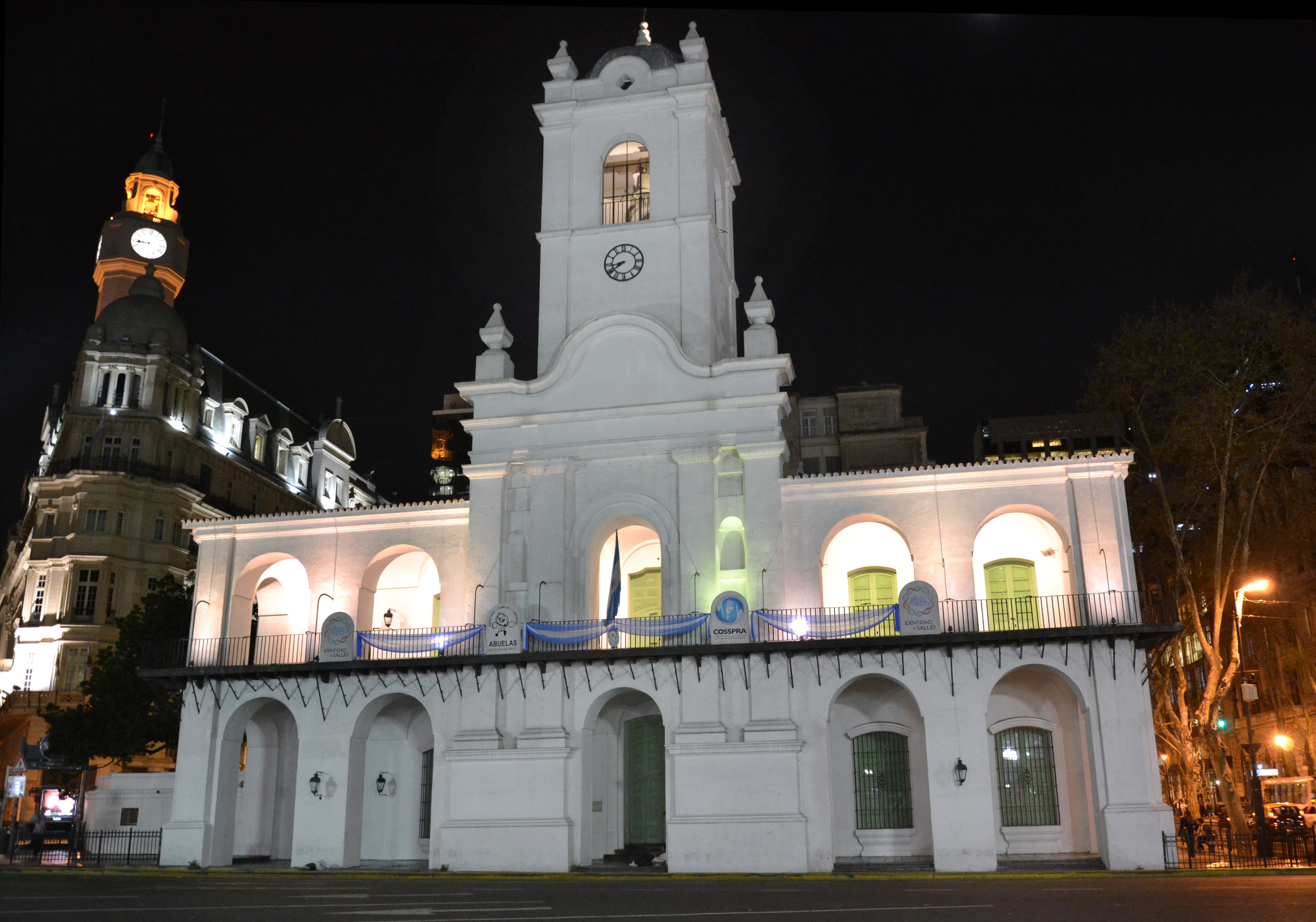
At night
