= Operations plan =

Secret document attributed to Mariano Moreno

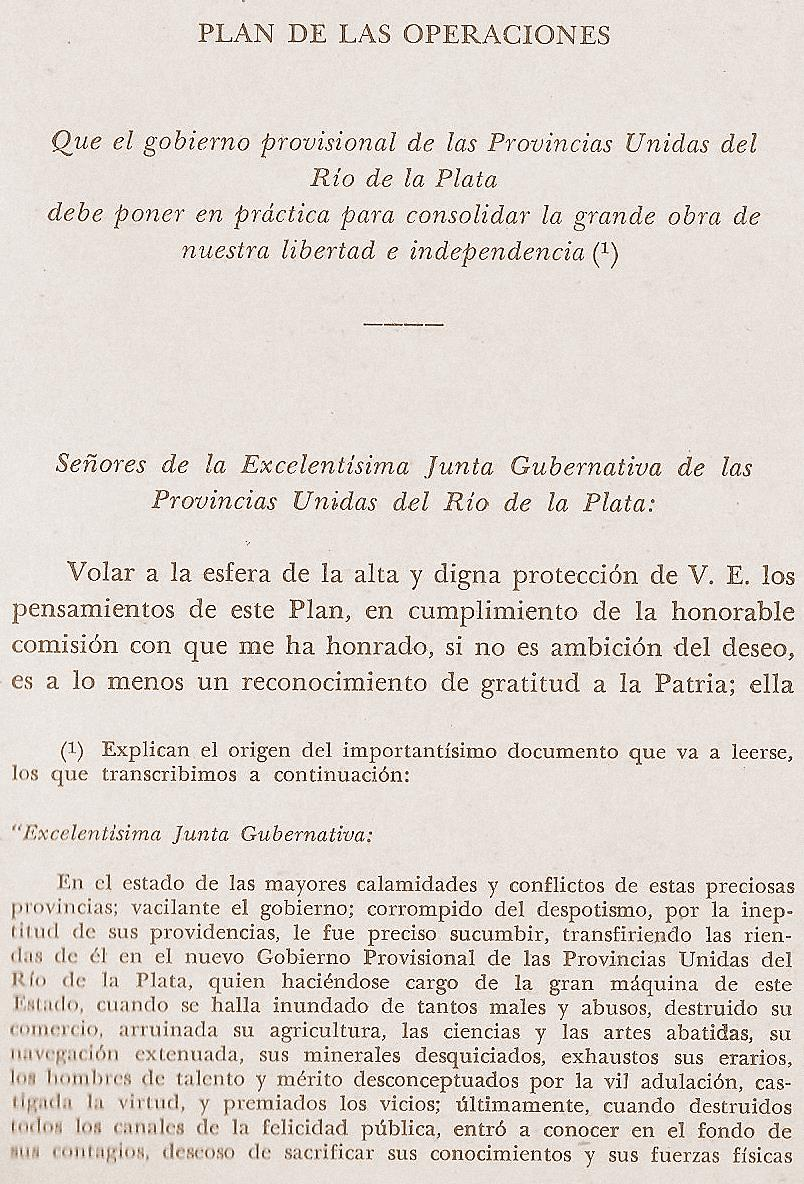
- First page of the Operations plan
- Original title: Plan de Operaciones
- Created: 1810
- Location: Unknown
- Author: Mariano Moreno
- Signatories: Primera Junta
- Purpose: Secret government platform for the Primera Junta

The Operations plan (Spanish: Plan de Operaciones) is a secret document attributed to Mariano Moreno, that set harsh ways for the Primera Junta, the first de facto independent government of Argentina in the 19th century, to achieve its goals. Some historians consider it a literary forgery, and others consider it true.

== Creation ==
According to historians who consider the document to be real, the need for it would have been the result of a meeting of Moreno, Manuel Belgrano, and Juan José Castelli, the latter two requesting Moreno to write it; by August 31, 1810, he proposed it to the whole Junta.

== Content ==
=== Actions against royalists ===
Mariano Moreno did not consider necessary to take any measures against absolutist monarchy itself. He thought that, in the wake of the events of the Peninsular War, the House of Bourbon had destroyed itself, and it would be enough to simply let it stay that way. The document states the need to defeat the royalist forces and therefore proposes many possible actions similar to those employed by Jacobins during the Reign of Terror of the French Revolution. It rejected the use of political moderation, considering that it would be dangerous during revolutionary times. It compared the South American revolution, still in its early steps, with the French and North American ones, and even the revolution in Spain itself, pointing that none of those relied solely in conspirations or secret meetings.

The document divides people into three main groups, loyals, open enemies and neutrals. It proposes to give privileges to the loyals, and fill the state offices with them, but using circumstantial honours rather than rushed promotions. Moreno made an exception with moderated supporters driven by a desire of honours or recognition, he considered that they may be useful at a later stage of the revolution, but not at the early ones. Peninsulars, on the other hand, should be carefully monitored, and punished at the slightest proof of action against the Junta; and executed when they were rich or influential. For this end, the Junta would need to create an espionage network. Top military or political personnel, such as enemy governors or generals, should be executed after their capture. This policy towards peninsulars is coherent with the actions taken against the Liniers counter-revolution, and similar to the one employed by Simón Bolívar in the North shortly after. In respect to the press, the document proposed to give broad press coverage to the news that may benefit the government and conceal the ones that may harm it.

Moreno thought that a blockade against Montevideo would not be effective, for the Montevidean naval supremacy over Buenos Aires. He proposed instead to weaken Montevideo by getting the support of the nearby smaller cities and villages. Moreno thought as well that José Gervasio Artigas and José Rondeau would be invaluable allies, and that Buenos Aires should use any resource at its disposal to have them join the fight against absolutism. Once the city was captured, he proposed to confiscate the ships and properties of royalists. All the people that could not prove loyalty to the cause would be banished to the Malvinas or Carmen de Patagones, or drafted in the army for 15 years; the old people would be only banished, but spared from prison or hard works.

He also noticed the internal conflicts at Chile and Paraguay, and urged to provide support to the local patriots against the local royalists.

The text was abolitionist as well. It proposed to end the slave trade, and emancipate the slaves with peninsular masters. To avoid conflicts with patriots owners of slaves, those slaves would be drafted into the militias, with the option of becoming free negros after their military service.

=== International relations ===
On the level of international relations, Mariano Moreno rejected the slavery in Brazil, a neighbour Portuguese colony. He proposed to distribute large numbers of Gazeta de Buenos Ayres newspapers, filled with libertarian ideas and translated to Portuguese language, and provide military support to the slaves that may riot. He considered a great menace the risk of a complete Spanish defeat in the Peninsular War or a restoration of absolutism and regarded Britain as a potential ally against such menaces. During a conflict, Britain would be able to provide them with weapons, and other goods that were not produced locally. Critics of Moreno consider him an Anglophile because of this proposal, but the same documents warns later against the risk of Britain having too much influence in the economic life of the country. He also criticized the relation between Britain and Portugal, considering that Portugal was subject to a "shameful slavery" to Britain, and that the British influence in Brazil was so high that the Portuguese colonies may eventually become British ones. Moreno held the same ideas about being friendly but cautious with Britain in the pages of the Gazeta newspaper.

In respect to the relation with Spain, Moreno thought that a premature declaration of independence would not be appropriate, and advised to wait for the revolution to strengthen and to see the final outcome of the Peninsular War. He thought that it was advisable to proclaim loyalty to Ferdinand VII at every document, as it would ease the relation with foreign countries, and Spain itself would doubt which party, the patriots or the royalists, was more loyal to the king.

=== Economy ===
In the economic field, it addressed the lack of a bourgeoisie that may turn the political changes into economic development and proposed to overcome such lack with an active state intervention. Mariano Moreno proposed that the state destined 200 or 300 million to create factories, manufacturing, arts, agriculture, navigation, and other critical areas. There would be no risk of bankruptcy because the state would manage those businesses. With the money generated from those activities, the state would then seek seeds and tools, and ultimately allow the continent to be economically self-reliant. The initial money that the state would need to become such an active economic force would come from the mines in Potosi, where the slavers had nearly 500 or 600 million. Moreno proposed simply to confiscate it, and nationalize the mines. He reasoned that five or six thousand people would be harmed by such action, but eighty or a hundred thousands would be benefited. The state would not manage those areas indefinitely; Moreno proposed that this should be done only until there was a strong economic activity in each area, and then the state would just watch the activities, making sure that they followed laws enacted for the common good of society.

The early 19th-century liberalism did not promote confiscation among their common proposals, but a similar antecedent of this proposal was the Conspiracy of the Equals, promoted by François-Noël Babeuf during the French Revolution. Moreno thought that state-sized fortunes managed by a few individuals were detrimental to civil society, and those individuals would tend to take up the roles of the state in their own benefit, but without fixing the problems of society at large.

The document proposed as well to avoid exporting money, and to include high tariffs to the import of luxury goods. This is often seen as a contradiction with The Representation of the Hacendados, but both ones request different things. The Representation opposed the absolute prohibition to trade with Britain, which is not the same as allowing it but following a protectionist policy. As secretary, Moreno reduced the tariffs over national exports, but kept high ones for imports, which would only be removed during the First Triumvirate, years later.

== Controversy ==
The first copy of the Plan was found in the Archives of Indias of Sevilla (Spain) by Eduardo Madero, who was studying the history of the port of Buenos Aires. He sent it to Argentina. Bartolomé Mitre received it but lost it, in unknown circumstances. Norberto Piñeiro found a second one, but instead of sending it back to Buenos Aires, he published it. Other historians would later draw relations between the Plan and the government acts of the Junta such as the execution of Santiago de Liniers after the Liniers Counter-revolution or the work of Castelli at the Upper Peru.

Historian Paul Groussac and later Ricardo Levene accused the document of being a forgery, written by an enemy of the revolution in order to discredit it. Levene also insisted in that the copy found was not handwritten by Mariano Moreno but by Andrés Álvarez de Toledo. Supporters of the document accepted it, stating that the document found was not the original but a copy, and that it was not something unexpected that the copy was handwritten by another man. The original document, handwritten by Mariano Moreno, has not been discovered yet.

No other texts of the time written by the members of the Junta, either public or private, make mention to the Operations plan. However, Enrique Ruiz Guiñazú published in 1952 a pair of letters of Carlota Joaquina and Ferdinand VII, where both members of the house of Bourbon make direct reference to the plan written by Moreno. Carlota also cited in it parts of such document, which are coherent with the copy found by Piñeiro.

Later, some authors question the authorship of Moreno, and stated that some expressions or redaction styles may suggest it to be the work of Manuel Belgrano or Hipólito Vieytes. Supporters of the document like Norberto Galasso accept a middle ground option: the document may be the result of a collaborative writing instead that of a single author, even if Moreno wrote most of it.

== See also ==
- Mariano Moreno
- Primera Junta
- May Revolution
