= Mariano Moreno =

Argentine lawyer, journalist, and politician

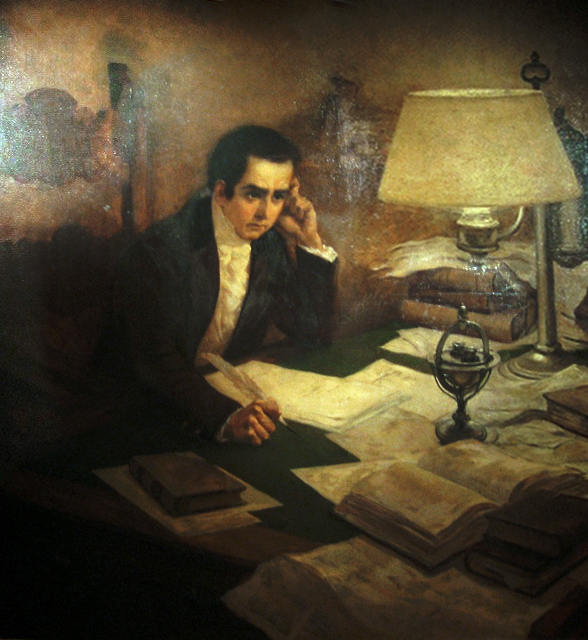
- Mariano Moreno en su mesa de trabajo, canonical aspect of Mariano Moreno, as designed by Adolfo Carranza and Pedro Subercaseaux

Secretary of War and Government of the Primera Junta
- In office 1810–1811
- President: Cornelio Saavedra

Personal details
- Born: September 23, 1778 Buenos Aires, Viceroyalty of the Río de la Plata
- Died: March 4, 1811 (aged 32) Atlantic Ocean
- Party: Patriot
- Other political affiliations: Alzaguism
- Spouse: María Guadalupe Cuenca
- Relations: Manuel Moreno
- Education: St Francis Xavier University of Chuquisaca
- Occupation: Lawyer
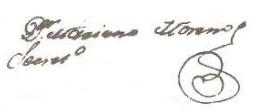
- Signature

Mariano Moreno (Spanish pronunciation: [maˈɾjano moˈɾeno]; September 23, 1778 – March 4, 1811) was an Argentine lawyer, journalist, and politician. He played a decisive role in the Primera Junta, the first national government of Argentina, created after the May Revolution.

Moreno was born in Buenos Aires in 1778. His father was Manuel Moreno y Argumosa, born in Santander, Spain, who arrived in the city in 1776 and married Ana María del Valle. Mariano was the firstborn of the Moreno family and had thirteen brothers. During his youth he studied Latin, logic, and philosophy at San Carlos Royal College under Mariano Medrano, followed by college studies of law at Chuquisaca. During these studies, he learned the new ideas of the Spanish Enlightenment. He married María Guadalupe Cuenca and returned to Buenos Aires, becoming a prominent lawyer for the Cabildo. Unlike most other criollos, he rejected the Carlotist project and the administration of Santiago de Liniers, joining instead the ill-fated mutiny of Álzaga against him. He worked for the next viceroy, Baltasar Hidalgo de Cisneros. He wrote the economic paper The Representation of the Landowners, which persuaded the viceroy to open trade with Britain.

Although he was not prominently involved in the May Revolution that deposed Cisneros, he was appointed as secretary of war of the new government, the Primera Junta. Along with Juan José Castelli, he promoted harsh policies against the supporters of the former government and the strengthening of the new one. These policies were detailed in a secret document, the Operations plan; some historians dispute its authorship. Moreno organized military campaigns to Paraguay and Upper Peru and ensured the execution of Santiago de Liniers after the defeat of his counter-revolution. He established the first Argentine newspaper, La Gazeta de Buenos Ayres, and translated Jean-Jacques Rousseau's The Social Contract into Spanish.

When the Junta achieved the first military victories, President Cornelio Saavedra opposed Moreno, favoring moderate policies instead. Allied with Gregorio Funes, Saavedra expanded the number of members of the Junta to leave Morenism in a minority. With disputes still going on, Moreno was appointed to a diplomatic mission to Britain but died at sea on the way there. His brother Manuel Moreno alleged that he was poisoned. His supporters were still an influential political party for some years after his death. Historians hold several perspectives about the role and historical significance of Moreno, from hagiography to repudiation. He is considered the precursor of Argentine journalism.

== Birth and studies ==
Mariano Moreno was the eldest of 14 children of poor parents, Manuel Moreno y Argumosa (born in Santander, Spain) and Ana María del Valle. He studied at Colegio Grande de San Carlos, but without living in it, as his family could not afford the price. He graduated with an honorary diploma. He met influential people within the literary field, who helped him to continue his studies at the University of Chuquisaca, even when his father could not afford the cost.

This was the only large university in South America at the time. He studied the books of Montesquieu, Voltaire, Denis Diderot, Jean-Jacques Rousseau, and other European philosophers of the Age of Enlightenment. He studied English and French languages as well, to understand authors from Britain and France. This allowed him to work as a translator, and he spent several years working with Rousseau's The Social Contract. Moreno was convinced that society could be changed by the power of intelligence and reason.

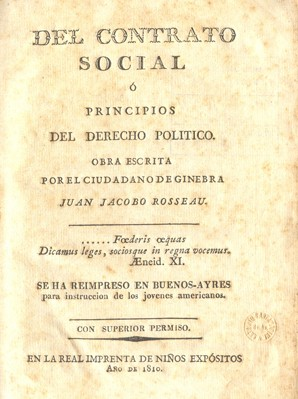
Jean-Jacques Rousseau's The Social Contract, translated into Spanish by Mariano Moreno

He also studied philosophical texts of the Spanish Enlightenment under the tutelage of the priest Terrazas and aspired to implement the new ideas in his country. He wrote a thesis with strong criticism of the native slavery at the mines of Potosí, influenced by the Spanish jurist Juan de Solorzano Pereira, the foremost publisher of Indian Law, and Victoria Villalva, fiscal of the Audiencia of Charcas and defender of the indigenous cause.

He started his professional career between 1803 and 1804, in the office of Augustine Gascón, officiating as labor counselor for Indians. As a result, he confronted powerful people like the mayors of Cochabamba and Chayanta. He left the city after being threatened and returned to Buenos Aires in 1805 with his wife Maria Guadalupe Cuenca and their newborn son. Once in the city, he became a reporter of the hearings of the Royal Audiencia, a local appeallate court. The Buenos Aires Cabildo, the local council, hired him as an advisor as well. He defended Melchor Fernández, aggrieved by Bishop Benito Lue y Riega, in one of his first cases. In another of his early disputes, he backed the Cabildo in denying the appointment as an ensign of the young Bernardino Rivadavia.

A British army invaded Buenos Aires in 1806, as part of the British invasions of the Río de la Plata. Although Moreno was not actively involved with the military counter-offensive which forced them to surrender, he expressed his loyalty to the Spanish crown in writing. He wrote a diary that noted all the events, so that, in the future, his countrymen would know the circumstances which occurred in the city that allowed for an invasion to succeed. The British launched a new offensive in 1807, this time capturing Montevideo. They published a bilingual English–Spanish newspaper known as "The Southern Star" or "La estrella del sur" (the newspaper used both names in conjunction). It advocated free trade and promoted Latin American independence from Spain under British protection.

The Royal Audiencia of Buenos Aires banned the newspaper and requested Moreno to write articles refuting those of the publication. Moreno refused because, although he remained loyal to the Spanish crown, he agreed with some of the criticisms made by the newspaper against the Spanish colonial government. Fearing a new attack to Buenos Aires, Moreno left the city with his whole family and relocated in the countryside. His house in Buenos Aires, left unoccupied, was later used to keep prisoner William Carr Beresford, the British commander of the first invasion. Several friends of Moreno helped Beresford to escape and move to Montevideo, but it is unknown if Moreno was aware of the plan.

== First political activities ==
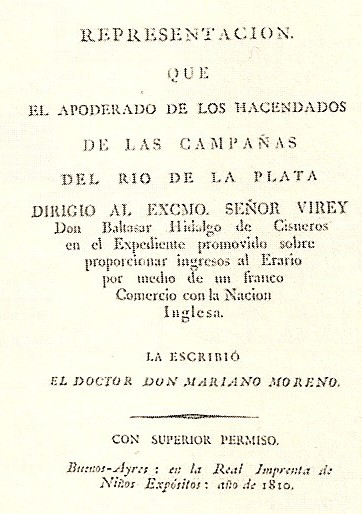
The Representation of the Landowners, economic paper written by Mariano Moreno

Although Mariano Moreno was a criollo, a Spanish citizen born in the Americas, he did not work with the other criollos of Buenos Aires who sought to promote political changes against the privileges of the Spanish-born. Unlike the criollo politicians Manuel Belgrano and Juan José Castelli, he did not support viceroy Liniers or the Carlotist project, which sought the coronation of Carlota of Spain in the Americas. He joined mayor Martín de Álzaga instead, which allowed him to serve as a legal adviser of the Cabildo. In that capacity, he wrote a petition to the King of Spain, so that the Buenos Aires Cabildo was named Protector of the Cabildos of the Viceroyalty of the Río de la Plata. As a result, all petitions from local cabildos to the King or the Viceroy would be channeled through the Cabildo at the capital.

Martín de Álzaga organized a mutiny on January 1, 1809, and Moreno joined it. Álzaga aspired to replace Viceroy Santiago de Liniers with a government Junta, after learning of the capture of the Spanish King Ferdinand VII during the Peninsular War and the creation of the Junta of Seville. If it prevailed, Mariano Moreno would have been part of the new Junta. The mutiny was defeated by the swift reaction of Cornelio Saavedra, in command of the Regiment of Patricians, who dispersed the crowd and persuaded Liniers not to abdicate. It is disputed by historians whenever the mutiny had similar or opposite goals to those of the May Revolution that would take place a year later. The historians who support the latter perspective try to make attempts to excuse or justify Moreno's involvement; those who support the former consider instead that Moreno was a revolutionary a year before most other Argentines. Moreno was Álzaga's lawyer in the trial that followed, which was labeled a trial for "independentism". Liniers did not extend the trial to Moreno himself, for reasons unknown.

Liniers was succeeded by Baltasar Hidalgo de Cisneros a few months later, who pardoned the mutineers to reduce political conflicts. Cisneros allowed free trade as well, as instructed by the Junta of Seville, which benefited British merchants; Britain was allied with Spain in the Peninsular War. The agents of the Consulate of Cadiz asserted that this would hurt the local economy, moral values, social usages, religious practices, and the loyalty to Spain and its monarchy. As a result, Cisneros closed trade again, restoring the Spanish monopsony. A group of hacendados (owners of haciendas), who did not feel adequately represented at the Cabildo, asked Moreno to defend them. Moreno wrote The Representation of the Landowners, a report that represented the export interest of the landowners, encouraged free trade and condemned the privileges of the merchants benefited from the monopsony. It is considered the most comprehensive economic report from the time of the viceroyalty. It represented the new European economic ideas and noted that the legal monopsony with Spain did not prevent British goods from being smuggled into Latin America. Several authors have questioned Moreno's authorship of the paper, considering it instead an update of another, previously drafted by Manuel Belgrano, Secretary of the Commerce Consulate of Buenos Aires, written to make a similar request to the former viceroy Liniers.

== Primera Junta ==
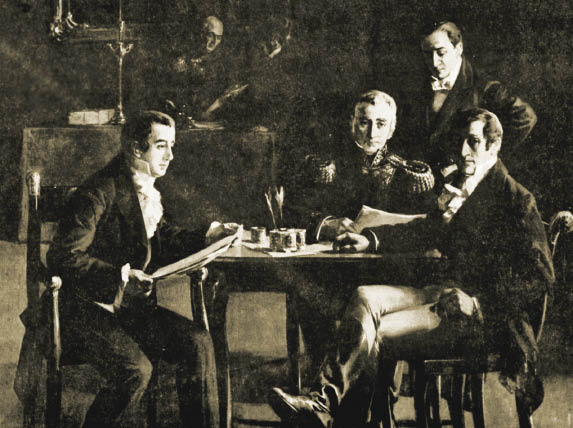
Mariano Moreno (left) as a member of the Primera Junta.

Mariano Moreno had several contacts with groups seeking the removal of Cisneros but was not strongly involved with the May Revolution, which considered the fall of the Junta of Seville a reason to depose the viceroy and create a local junta. At the time, Moreno was still loyal to Álzaga. He attended the May 22 open Cabildo, but according to the father of Vicente Fidel López and the father-in-law of Bartolomé Mitre (both direct witness) he stayed silent at one side and did not join the debate. He voted for Saavedra's proposal: to remove viceroy Cisneros and replace him with a Junta. Manuel Hermenegildo Aguirre, captain of hussars, proposed that the Cabildo take the reins of government, with five men appointed as counselors, Moreno among them. However, nobody else voted for that proposal, and it was the only one that included him. Moreno felt betrayed when the Cabildo twisted the results of the open Cabildo and created a Junta that would be headed by Cisneros. He refused any further contacts with the revolutionaries and stayed home during the remaining events. The definitive members of the Junta came from a popular petition signed on May 25, which was given to the Cabildo. The reasons for Moreno's inclusion in the list are unclear, as with all other members of the Junta. A commonly accepted theory considers it to be a balance between Carlotists and Alzaguists.

The Junta faced strong opposition from the beginning: it was resisted locally by the Cabildo and the Royal Audiencia, still loyal to the absolutist factions; the nearby plazas of Montevideo and Paraguay did not recognize it, and Santiago de Liniers organized a counter-revolution at Córdoba. Mariano Moreno, an unimportant politician up to that point, became the leader of the most radical supporters of the Junta. He was supported by the popular leaders Domingo French and Antonio Beruti, Dupuy, Donado, Orma, and Cardozo; and priests like Grela and Aparicio. Historian Carlos Ibarguren described that Morenist youths roamed the streets preaching new ideas to each pedestrian they found, turned the "Marcos" coffee shop into a political hall, and proposed that all social classes should be illustrated. Manuel Belgrano and Juan José Castelli supported Moreno within the Junta, and French was promoted to Colonel of the regiment "América". This regiment, also known as "The Star" because of a star that they wore on their sleeves, was composed of radical youths led by French during the riots of the May Revolution.

Moreno established the official newspaper Gazeta de Buenos Ayres through a June 2 decree and managed its contents. The first newspapers were available to the public five days later. He issued a freedom of the press decree, which allowed the press to publish anything that did not offend public morals or attack the Revolution or the government. Moreno published some works of Gaspar de Jovellanos and his translation of Jean-Jacques Rousseau's The Social Contract. In this later work, he skipped the chapter about religion, suggesting that the author "has raved in religious matters". This was done to prevent religious disputes among patriots. This publication was criticized by conservatives such as Tomás de Anchorena, who said that it could generate popular unrest. As with the Junta itself, Moreno's writings maintained loyalty to Ferdinand VII. It is unclear to historians whether he was concealing pro-independence ambitions, or was truly loyal to the deposed king. However, he made specific references to independentism as early as November 1810. In reference to the Courts of Cádiz that would write a Constitution, he said that the Congress "may establish an absolute disposal of our beloved Ferdinand", meaning that the right of self-determination would allow even that. He did not think the monarchical authority to be absolute, but subject to popular sovereignty, so that a monarch may lose his authority if he worked against the common good of the people. He also considered that if Ferdinand VII returned to the throne, he would not be able to challenge a Constitution written in his absence. However, he wrote that as a hypothetical scenario, to describe the strength of a Constitution, not as a likely possibility.

Moreno issued several decrees during his first days in government. He ordered punishment for anyone attempting to generate disputes, and for those concealing conspiracies against the Junta or other people. The military bodies of "Pardos" and "Morenos", composed of indigenous peoples, were reformed to have military ranks similar to those of the Spanish military bodies. He did this by invoking the rulings of the Catholic Monarchs during the early Spanish colonization of the Americas.

=== Actions against royalists ===
Execution of Santiago de Liniers

Although the Junta of Seville was defeated, a new one was created afterward, the Regency Council. The Primera Junta did not swear loyalty to it, but the Royal Audiencia did so in defiance of the local authority. The Junta summoned them, along with former viceroy Cisneros, and exiled them to Spain with the pretext that there was a threat to their lives. The Junta appointed new members for the Audiencia loyal to the revolution. Moreno wrote in the Gazeta that the Audiencia attacked the good faith of the government and that the Junta left their usual moderation for the safety of the people.

The Junta was rejected in Montevideo, as was the exile of Cisneros and the former Audiencia. Moreno reacted immediately, replying to the Montevidean concerns. He supported the legitimacy of the Primera Junta by criticizing the Regency Council and stating that the overseas Spanish territories were equally capable of creating Juntas, as it was debated during the open cabildo. He also called for unity and support of the metropolis, and that both cities recognize Ferdinand VII as their legitimate monarch. He argued that the Junta treated the exiles initially with moderation, but their obstinacy, particularly on the part of Cisneros, generated popular discontent. Matías Irigoyen told the same thing to the British diplomat Lord Strangford in Rio de Janeiro.

==== First Expedition ====
The first one, headed by Francisco Ortiz de Ocampo, would move to Córdoba and attack the counter-revolution organized by the former viceroy Santiago de Liniers; they next went to Upper Peru. Ocampo's initial orders were to capture the counter-revolutionary leaders and send them to Buenos Aires so that they could be judged. When the counter-revolution became stronger Moreno called the Junta and, with support from Castelli and Paso, proposed that the enemy leaders should be shot as soon as they were captured instead of brought to trial. The Junta accepted the new proposal and delivered it to Ocampo.

The counter-revolution was defeated the following August, but Ocampo did not execute his prisoners. Gregorio Funes, head of the patriotic party of Córdoba, persuaded him to spare them because the prisoners were popular in Córdoba and the people would not support their deaths. Besides Liniers, the prisoners included the governor of Córdoba and the bishop of the city. Ocampo stuck to the initial orders and delivered the prisoners to the city. Moreno did not accept it and told Ocampo that a general should simply obey orders. He called a new meeting of the Junta, and produced a paper left at his home which said, "If Liniers does not die, LET HIM LIVE!" (note: the second part was written in capital letters in the original). The Junta agreed to fire Ocampo and replace him with Castelli, with Nicolás Rodríguez Peña as secretary and Domingo French leading the escort. They intercepted the convoy at Cabeza de Tigre and executed them, except for Bishop Orellana, because of his religious endowment. The Auxiliary Army, commanded by Ocampo and Castelli, was renamed as the Army of the North and launched the First Upper Peru campaign. Moreno gave harsh new instructions for it; namely:

- monitor the activities of the rich;
- kill Goyeneche, Nieto, Paula Sanz and the bishop on sight; and
- allow soldiers to pillage the enemies at the first patriot victory, to generate terror.

The context was not favorable: only Cochabamba and Charcas made a genuine support of the revolution, and some indigenous people hesitated in joining, fearing the consequences of a possible royalist counter-attack. The Morenist projects for Upper Peru, which included the emancipation of the indigenous peoples and the nationalization of the mines of Potosi, were resisted by the local populations that were benefiting from the system already in force. Castelli proposed to advance the military campaign even closer to Lima, but Moreno asked him to stay at his position.

==== Second Expedition ====
The other military expedition moved to Paraguay, commanded by Manuel Belgrano. Following instructions from Moreno, he helped the natives at the missions in Corrientes, on his way to Paraguay. He gave them full civil and political rights, granted lands, authorized commerce with the United Provinces, removed taxes for ten years, abolished any type of torture, and lifted restrictions on taking public or religious office.

Moreno promoted stronger measures against the royalists. In July, he gave orders to the neighboring mayors to prevent the creation of secret groups, or activities that could promote alienation. He promoted a new decree of the Junta that called for trial and confiscation of goods for anyone that left the city without authorization, kept military weapons in secret, promoted popular alienation or discontent against the government, or wrote letters to people in other cities for such a purpose. Serious cases were usually punished with execution or exile. Some rich people exiled by this decree were Francisco Beláustegui, Olaguer Reynals, Norberto de Quirno y Echeandía, and Pablo Villariño. Manuel Andrés Arroyo y Pinedo, another rich man, blamed Moreno for these actions, accusing him of equaling disagreement with anti-patriotism, and felt that the ideas of egalitarianism would only cause great evils. Those measures were also criticized by moderate supporters of the revolution, such as Gregorio Funes from Córdoba, who rejected the lack of proper trials, or Dámaso Uriburu, from Salta, who compared Moreno, Castelli, and Vieytes with the French Jacobins.

By this time, Moreno thought that the only way to secure the Revolution would be if it was successful throughout the continent. However, he considered that Latin American integration should be achieved peacefully among equals, and not as the result of a conquest campaign. He wrote at the Gazeta that "even as pure as our intentions may be, it would be dangerous if the freedom of America was just our own work. Such a circumstance could lead to a real despotism and the Peruvian peoples would not improve having porteño oppressors instead of European ones." He made positive comments about the rebellions at Cochabamba and Chile.

=== Operations plan ===
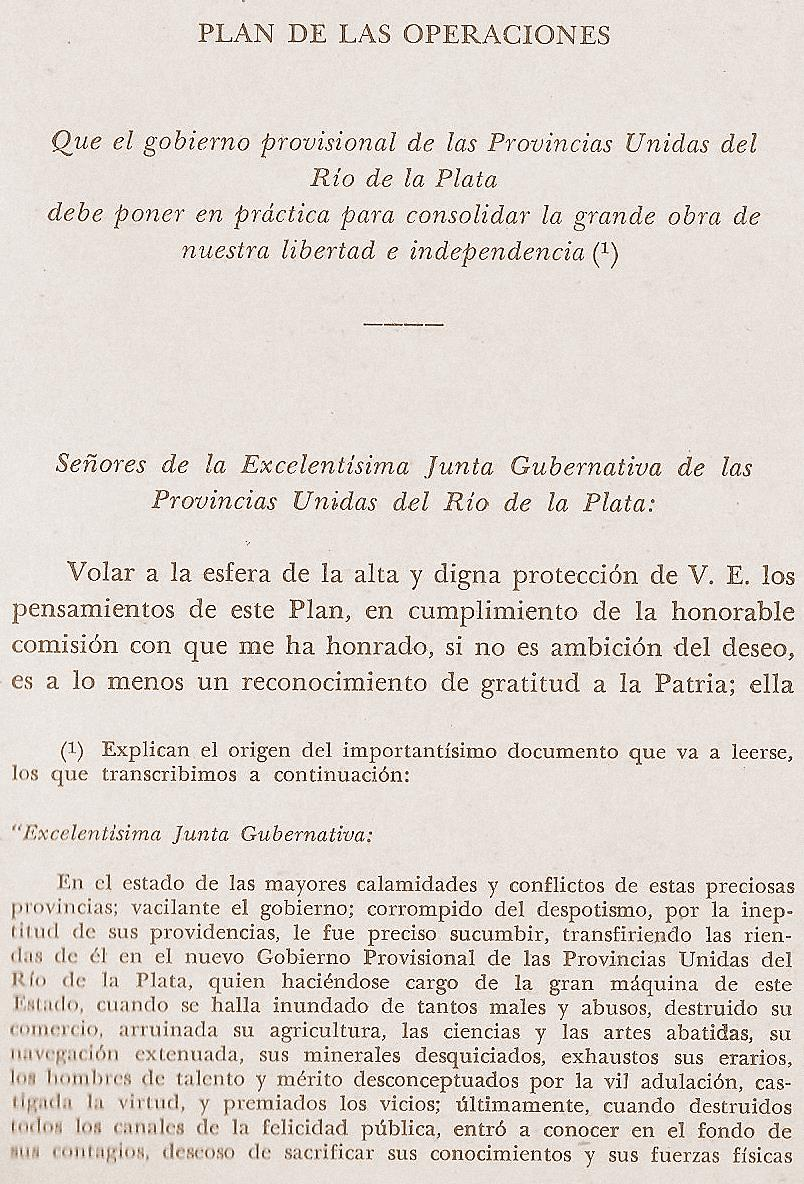
The first page of the Operations plan

Following a proposal of Manuel Belgrano, the Junta wrote a political platform setting broad goals and procedures to follow to achieve its objectives. The creation of this document, whose name is often summarized simply as the "Operations plan", was trusted to Mariano Moreno. There have been disputes about the authenticity of this document. Some historians like Paul Groussac suspect that the document was a literary forgery, prepared by a Spaniard at the Court of Portugal to discredit the Junta. Supporters of the truthfulness of the document like Norberto Piñeiro, allege that the content would be consistent with government actions taken by the Primera Junta.

The document states the need to defeat the royalist forces and therefore proposes many possible actions similar to those employed by Jacobins during the Reign of Terror of the French Revolution. It rejected the use of political moderation, considering that it would be dangerous during revolutionary times. It compared the South American revolution, still in its early stages, with the French and North American ones, and even the revolution in Spain itself, pointing out that none of those relied solely upon conspiracies or secret meetings. The document proposes to favor patriots and fill the state offices with them. Peninsulars, on the other hand, should be carefully monitored, and punished at the slightest proof of action against the Junta, and executed if they were rich or influential. For this end, the Junta would need to create an espionage network. This policy towards peninsulars is coherent with the actions taken against the Liniers Counter-revolution and similar to the one employed by Simón Bolívar in the North shortly after. Moreno thought that José Gervasio Artigas would be an invaluable ally and that Buenos Aires should use any resource at its disposal to have him join the fight against absolutism. He noted the internal conflicts in Chile and Paraguay and urged support of local patriots against local royalists.

On the level of international relations, Mariano Moreno rejected slavery in Brazil, a neighboring Portuguese colony. He proposed to distribute large numbers of Gazeta de Buenos Ayres newspapers, filled with libertarian ideas and translated into Portuguese, and provide military support to the slaves if they should riot. He considered the risk of a complete Spanish defeat in the Peninsular War or a restoration of absolutism great menaces and regarded Britain as a potential ally against them. During a conflict, Britain would be able to supply them with weaponry and other goods not produced locally. Despite his Anglophile leanings, the same document also warned against the possibility of allowing Britain too much influence in the national economy. He criticized the relationship between Britain and Portugal, in particular the junior position of Portugal in regards to her alliance with Britain and claimed that British influence in Brazil was so high that the colony might eventually become British instead. Moreno held the same ideas about being simultaneously friendly and reserved with Britain in the pages of the Gazeta newspaper.

In the economic field, the document addressed the lack of a bourgeoisie that could turn the political changes into economic development and proposed to overcome this lack with strong state interventionism. Mariano Moreno proposed that the state invest 200 or 300 million in factories, manufacturing, arts, agriculture, navigation, and other critical areas. There would be no risk of bankruptcy because the state would manage the businesses. With the money generated, the state would then seek seeds and tools and ultimately allow the continent to be economically autarchic. The initial money that the state would need to become such an active economic force would come from the mines in Potosi, where the slavers had nearly 500 or 600 million. Moreno proposed simply to confiscate the money and nationalize the mines. He reasoned that five or six thousand people would be harmed by such action, but eighty or a hundred thousand would benefit. The state would not manage those areas indefinitely; Moreno proposed that this should be done only until there was a strong economic activity in each area, and then the state would just observe, making sure that they followed the laws enacted for the common good of society.

Early 19th-century liberalism did not promote confiscation among their common proposals, but an antecedent of this proposal was the Conspiracy of the Equals, promoted by François-Noël Babeuf during the French Revolution. Moreno thought that state-sized fortunes managed by a few individuals were detrimental to civil society, and those individuals would tend to manage the economy for their own benefit, without fixing the problems of society at large.

The document proposed to avoid exporting money and to include high tariffs on the import of luxury goods. This is often seen as a contradiction of The Representation of the Hacendados, but each request different things. The Representation opposed the absolute prohibition of trade with Britain, which is not the same than allowing it while following a protectionist policy. As secretary, Moreno reduced the tariffs on national exports but kept high ones for imports.

=== Internal disputes ===
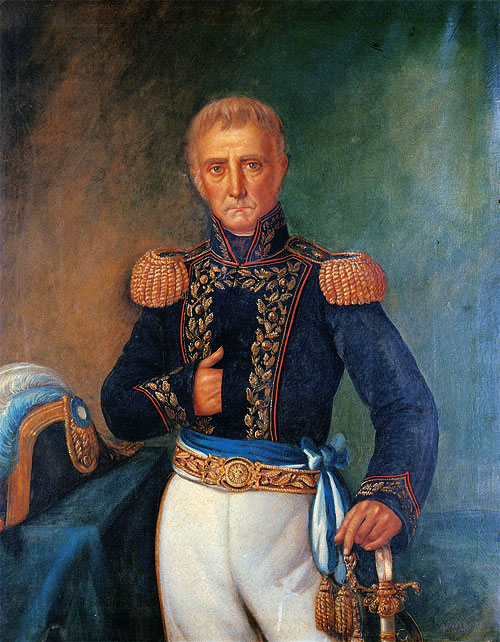
Cornelio Saavedra, president of the Primera Junta

Mariano Moreno and Cornelio Saavedra had disagreements about the events of the May Revolution and the way to run the government; their disputes became public shortly after the creation of the Junta. Saavedra was the president, and Moreno was a secretary with the support of other vocal members. Ignacio Núñez describes how Morenists felt that the President was attempting to restore in his office the authority of the viceroys, thus downgrading the importance of the other members of the Junta at public events; while Saavedrists considered that the Secretary was overstepping his authority and did not allow even the appointment of a janitor that was not of his liking. However, Domingo Matheu would clarify in his memoirs that their initial concerns with Saavedra were based more on his desire for honors and privileges than for a real power struggle. Núñez described how Moreno was resisted by some criollos who initially supported the revolution without being aware of the long-term consequences. He was resisted by criollos alarmed by his straightforward way of talking about concepts like self-determination, tyranny, slavery, and freedom. Theologians resented that Moreno cited authors like Rousseau, Voltaire, or Montesquieu rather than Christian philosophers like Saint Augustine or Saint Thomas. He was also resisted by conservative lawyers and by most of the military.

By October, Moreno's measures started to generate resistance among some who initially supported the May Revolution. Traders did not like the protectionist policy, and some members of the military had close ties with rich people and opposed their punishment. On October 16 it was discovered that ten members of the Cabildo had sworn loyalty to the Regency Council the past July, and they were all jailed. This included Julián Leiva and Juan José de Lezica. Moreno and Saavedra had a dispute when the Junta was deciding what to do. Moreno proposed executing them as a deterrent, accusing them of working with the Montevideo Cabildo, the enemy of the Junta. Saavedra replied that the government should promote leniency, and rejected the use of the Patricians Regiment to carry out such executions. The prisoners were finally exiled to Luján, Ranchos, and Salto, and Leiva was housed by Gregorio Funes in Córdoba.

By this point, the only military support for Moreno was Domingo French, head of "The Star" regiment. Castelli and Belgrano supported him but were far away from the capital on their respective military campaigns. The activists of the May Revolution supported him as well, as did other members of the Junta and other patriots like Vieytes and Nicolás Rodríguez Peña. Saavedra kept the strong support of the Regiment of Patricians and added that of the merchants and even some supporters of the former regime who deemed the moderated Saavedra a lesser evil. Moreno sought to modify the military balance of power by reforming the promotion rules. Up until that point, the sons of officials were automatically granted the status of cadet and were promoted just by seniority; Moreno arranged that promotions were earned by military merits instead. However, in the short run, this measure worked against him, as it antagonized members of the military who got promoted precisely because of such rules. He also thought that support from the lower classes was instrumental to the success of the Revolution, and wrote letters to Chiclana instructing him to generate such support at Upper Peru. Such popular involvement would take time to consolidate: the Guerra Gaucha, the War of the Republiquetas, and the rise of José Gervasio Artigas took place later, not as of 1810.

Saavedra increased his resistance to Moreno's proposals after the victory at the Battle of Suipacha, considering that the revolution had defeated its enemies and should relax its severity in consequence. The Regiment of Patricians hosted a banquet celebration at the barracks, restricting attendance to the military and supporters of Saavedra. Moreno was not allowed to pass by the guards at the door, which generated a small incident. That same night, Officer Atanasio Duarte, who was drunk, gave a crown of sugar to Saavedra's wife and saluted Saavedra as if he was the new king or emperor of the Americas. The next day, when Moreno heard about the incident, he wrote the "Honours Suppression decree", which suppressed the ceremony usually reserved for the president of the Junta and inherited privileges of the office of viceroy. Duarte was exiled, and Moreno's act was justified by stating that "An inhabitant of Buenos Aires neither drunk nor asleep should be expressed against the freedom of his country". Saavedra signed the decree without complaint, but Gregorio Funes felt that the Patricians resented Moreno because of this.

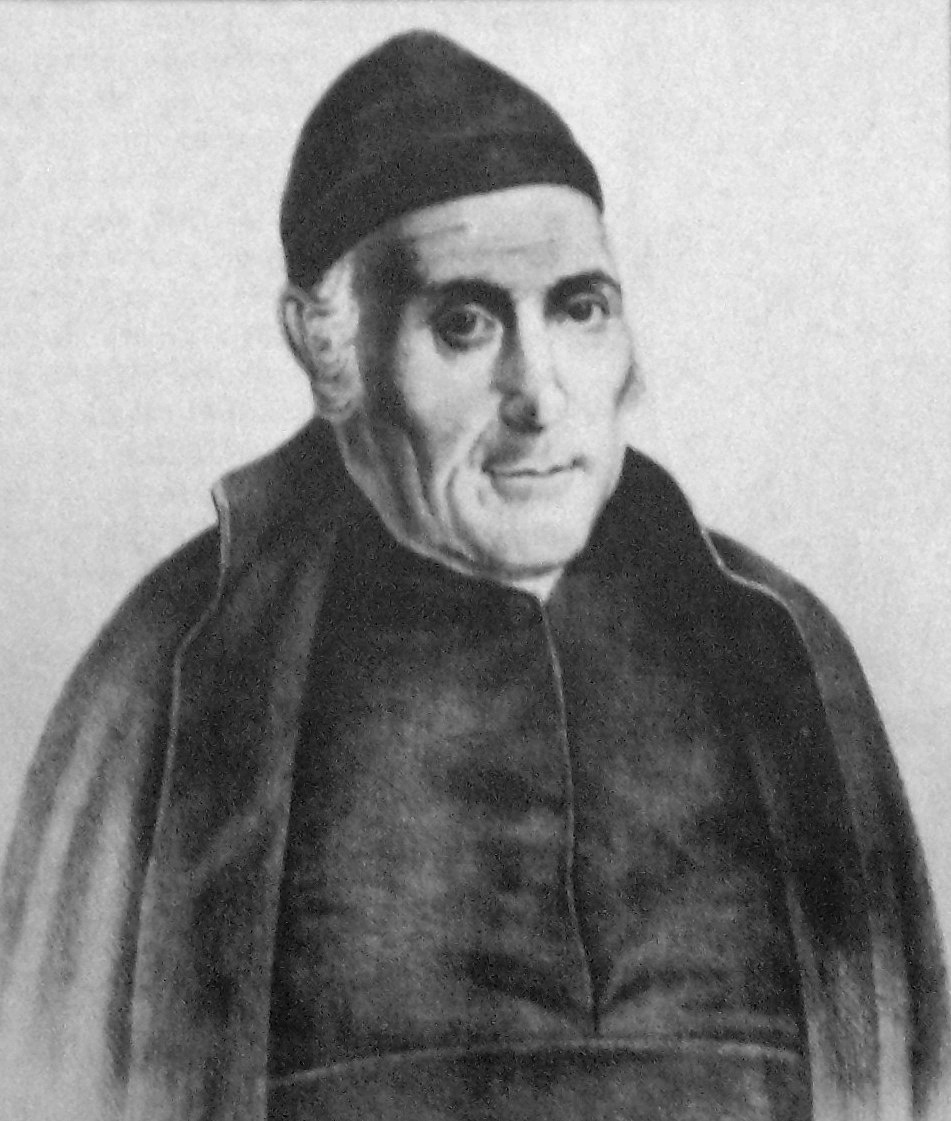
Gregorio Funes, from Córdoba, joined Saavedra against Moreno.

The conflicts between Moreno and Saavedra generated international reactions. Lord Strangford complained about the later actions of the Junta, such as the execution of Liniers, which were seen as more violent than the initial ones. Brazil was also concerned because many copies of the Gazeta were being distributed in Rio Grande do Sul, influencing their slaves with libertarian ideas. The Brazilian government sent Carlos José Guezzi to Buenos Aires, with the purpose of mediating in the conflict with the royalists at Montevideo and to ratify the aspirations of Carlota Joaquina to rule as regent. He met Saavedra in his first interview, in July, and got a positive impression of him. Saavedra said that if Carlota's rights were confirmed by the Spanish monarchy, Buenos Aires would support her, even if it meant they had to stand against the other provinces. The following month he requested a representative for the Court of Brazil, offered Carlota's mediation with Montevideo, and pointed out that Brazil had forces near the frontier, awaiting orders to attack the revolution. This time, Moreno resisted. Moreno rejected sending a representative and told him that the Junta did not work for the interests of Brazil, but for those of the United Provinces. He rejected the mediation as well, considering that no mediation was possible under a military threat. Guezzi was immediately sent back to Rio de Janeiro on the first available ship. He described Moreno as "the Robespierre of the day", and accused the Junta of attempting to build a republic.

In December, the deputies of the other provinces convened by the circular of May 27 arrived in Buenos Aires. Most of them were closer to the ideas of Saavedra, and Gregorio Funes became highly influential over them. They did not agree about which body they should join: the deputies wanted to join the Junta, while Moreno thought that they should start a constituent assembly. Funes, allied with Saavedra, calculated that they could stop Moreno by joining the Junta, as his proposals would be agreed to by a minority. The Junta, with both its original members and the deputies, discussed the topic on December 18. Funes said that Buenos Aires had no right to rule the other provinces without their consent, and got the support of the other members. He said that there was popular discontent with the Junta. The supporters of Moreno said that such discontent was only among some rebels, and Moreno said that it was only the discontent of the Patricians in respect of the Suppressions decree. However, only Paso voted with him, and the deputies joined the Junta. Moreno resigned, but his resignation was rejected. His opposition to the incorporation of the deputies is seen by some historians as an initial step in the conflict between Buenos Aires and the other provinces, which dominated politics in Argentina during the following decades. Some call it a precursor of the Unitarian Party, while others find his words or actions more consistent with the Federalist Party. However, historians Paul Groussac and Norberto Piñeiro feel it is inappropriate to extrapolate so far into the future. Piñeiro considered it an error to label Moreno as federal or unitary, proving that this organization been prioritized over the secondary aspect of centralism or federalism, while Groussac similarly notes that Moreno devoted all his energies to the immediate problem of achieving independence without giving much thought to possible long-term scenarios.

== Political decline and death ==
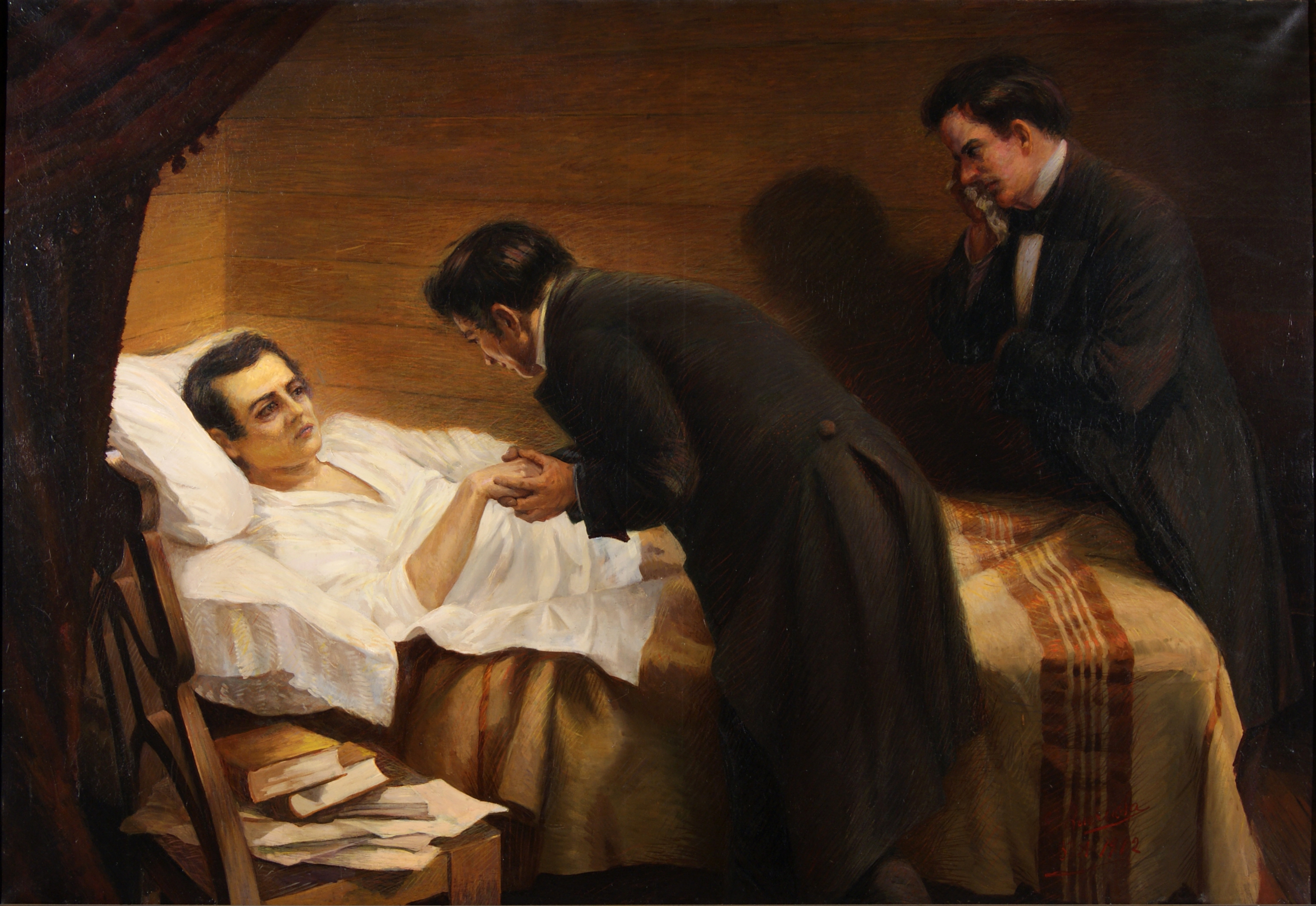
Death of Mariano Moreno.

Hipólito Vieytes was about to make a diplomatic mission to Britain, but Moreno requested that he should be given the appointment instead. Saavedra accepted immediately. He traveled to Britain with his brother Manuel Moreno and his secretary Tomás Guido, on the schooner Fame. His health declined and there was no doctor on board, but the captain refused requests to sail into some ports which were positioned along the route such as in Rio de Janeiro or Cape Town. The ship's captain, Walter Bathurst, gave him an emetic in common use at that time, prepared with four grams of antimony potassium tartrate. Moreno suffered great convulsions after ingesting the emetic and considered that in his state he could not have ingested more than the quarter of a gram without effect. He died shortly afterwards. His body was wrapped in a Union Jack and thrown into the sea, after a volley of musketry.

Manuel Moreno speculated later that he was poisoned by the captain. Manuel Moreno was unsure of whether the captain really gave him that substance, or if he substituted something else, or gave an even higher dose. Circumstances did not allow an autopsy to be performed. Further points used to sustain the idea of a murder are the captain's refusal to land elsewhere, his slow sailing, his administration of the emetic in secrecy, and that he didn't return to Buenos Aires with the ship. Enrique de Gandía pointed to an irregular ruling of the Junta that appointed a man named Curtis as Moreno's replacement for the diplomatic mission in the case of Moreno's death. The son of Mariano Moreno commented to the historian Adolfo Saldías that his mother, Guadalupe Cuenca, received an anonymous gift of a mourning hand fan and handkerchief, with instructions to use them soon. By that time, the murder of Moreno was a common assumption, and it was mentioned during the trial of residence of the members of the Junta. Juan Madera stated at the trial that Moreno may have requested to go to Britain because he was afraid of being murdered and that he may have stated this during the meeting when the Junta discussed his resignation. Modern author Manuel Luis Martín studied the health of both Moreno and his family and concluded that he died of natural causes.

== Legacy ==
Despite the death of Mariano Moreno, his supporters were still an influential party in Buenos Aires. Morenists accused Saavedra and Funes of plotting to allow the coronation of Carlota and organized a rebellion with "The Star" Regiment. However, the Saavedrists became aware of it and organized another rebellion on May 5 and 6, 1811. This rebellion requested strong changes in the government: the removal of Morenists Nicolás Rodríguez Peña, Hipólito Vieytes, Miguel Azcuénaga, and Juan Larrea from the Junta; the exile of Domingo French, Antonio Beruti, Agustín Donado, Gervasio Posadas and Ramón Vieytes; and the return and trial of Manuel Belgrano. Thus, the Morenist party was set apart from the government.

The Saavedrist hegemony was short-lived. The military defeats of Castelli and Belgrano started a new political crisis, and the First Triumvirate replaced the Junta Grande as the executive power, and then closed it completely. The former supporters of Moreno (Belgrano, Dupuy, Tomás Guido, Beruti, Monteagudo, French, Vicente López) would later support the campaign of José de San Martín. The Argentine war of independence would give room to the Argentine Civil War between unitarians and federals. Saavedrists like Martín Rodríguez, Ortiz de Ocampo, de la Cruz—and even Saavedra himself—became unitarians. Manuel Moreno, French, Agrelo, Vicente López, and Pancho Planes opposed both the First Triumvirate and the presidency of unitarian Bernardino Rivadavia. Manuel Moreno and Tomás Guido, in particular, worked in the government of the most powerful federal leader, Juan Manuel de Rosas.

The National Library of the Argentine Republic is named for him.

=== Historical perspectives ===
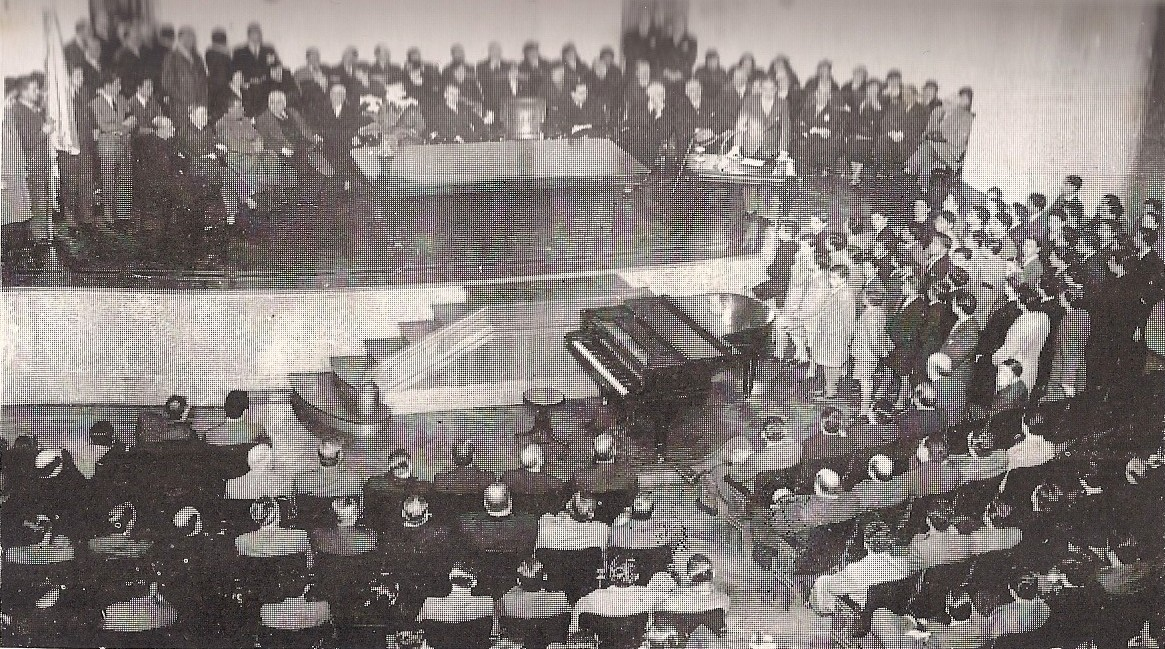
Argentine historian Ricardo Levene during a conference about Mariano Moreno.

Early Argentine historians described Mariano Moreno as the leader of the Revolution and a great historical man. Later liberal historians would embellish this portrayal even more. An example of this tendency is La Revolución de Mayo y Mariano Moreno by Ricardo Levene. Biographers would describe him as a serene statesman, a notable economist, a decided democrat, and a great leader. For those historians, Moreno would have been an Anglophile, and "The Representation of the Hacendados", the government platform of the May Revolution.

Subsequently, revisionist authors would formulate accusations against him, while promoting Saavedra as a popular leader. According to those authors, Moreno was in the employ of the British, a demagogic caudillo, a paranoid, a mere man of theoretical ideas applying European principles that failed in the local context, wrongly portrayed as the leader of the Revolution by the liberal historiography. Año X by Hugo Wast is considered the harshest work against Moreno. Moreno was still considered an Anglophile but in a negative light. They blamed Moreno for the harsh policies of the Junta, considering him a terrorist or a predecessor of Marxism; liberal historians usually concealed these policies.

Modern authors like Ernesto Palacio, Norberto Galasso, and Jorge Abelardo Ramos have attempted to rehabilitate the image of Moreno by avoiding both extremes: the sweet liberal Moreno and the horrible one written by revisionists. Those historians do not consider Bernardino Rivadavia a successor of Moreno, and the proposals to seek an alliance with Britain are not seen as the product of Moreno's Anglophilia, but just an example of the limited options available to the Primera Junta. Similarly, they do not attribute much influence to the Representation..., considering it a mere work for a client that did not really influence Cisneros, who would have allowed free trade for international contexts. The harsh policies are acknowledged, but not attributed specifically to Moreno, but rather to the whole Junta, and compared with similar royalist measures used to punish the Chuquisaca, the La Paz revolution, and the indigenous rebellion of Túpac Amaru II.

Moreno is also known as an liberal. Unlike Álzaga, Moreno advocated for free trade.

=== Journalism ===
Mariano Moreno is regarded as the first Argentine journalist, as he created the Gazeta de Buenos Ayres. June 7, the day this newspaper was first available to the public, is recognized in Argentina as "Journalist's Day" since 1938. The Gazeta, however, was not the first newspaper in Buenos Aires, but the first one since the May Revolution. The first newspaper was the Telégrafo Mercantil (1801), followed by the Semanario de Agricultura Industria y Comercio (1802) and the Correo de Comercio de Buenos Aires (1810), edited during the colonial period.

Moreno was the only one to sign the decree that established the newspaper, but the text implies that it was the result of a discussion of the whole Junta, and not just his initiative. A fellow member of the Junta, Manuel Alberti, was appointed as the director of the newspaper. However, Alberti never actually directed the newspaper; Moreno did. Historian Guillermo Furlong considers that it was really Alberti who directed the newspaper, but the memoirs of José Pedro Agrelo (a later director), Tomás Guido, and Saavedra confirm that the newspaper was managed by Moreno. Moreno has also been promoted as a supporter of the freedom of the press, but the Gazeta was actually a state-sponsored newspaper, and the Junta allowed such freedom only for information that was not against the interests of the government. According to Norberto Galasso, that situation would today be considered media bias.

== Personal life ==
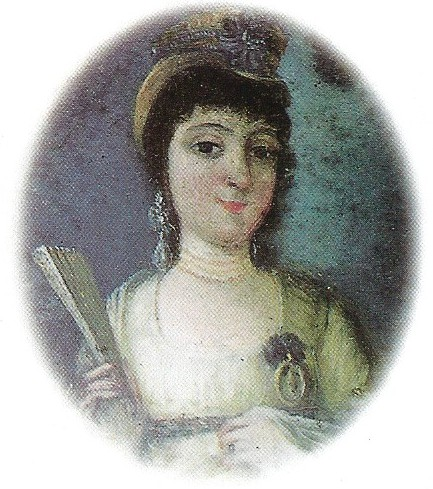
María Guadalupe Cuenca, wife of Mariano Moreno

The Moreno family was poor but could afford a house and some slaves. Ana María del Valle y Ramos, Mariano's mother, was one of the few literate women in Buenos Aires. Mariano Moreno was the firstborn of fourteen children. Mariano moved to Chuquisaca with his brother Manuel Moreno and their friend Tomás Guido once the family raised the money. The long and difficult journey gave Mariano a rheumatism attack; he had to stay in bed for fifteen days on arrival. He had further attacks years later. Moreno met María Guadalupe Cuenca in this city, after seeing a miniature portrait of her at a silversmith's house. Both Moreno and María were expected by their families to follow religious studies, and Moreno's father did not authorize a change. Moreno studied laws all the same and married María in secret to avoid family resistance. They had a single son, named Mariano like the father.

When Moreno left for Europe on a diplomatic mission in 1811, his wife and son stayed in Buenos Aires. María wrote many letters to Moreno, with descriptions of ongoing events in the city. Most of them were written when Moreno was already dead; she did not learn of his fate until the following August when a letter arrived from Manuel Moreno. She requested a widow's pension from the First Triumvirate, which was in power by then; its value was thirty pesos.

=== Beliefs ===
Mariano Moreno studied French and Spanish authors of the Age of Enlightenment during his studies at Chuquisaca. Jean-Jacques Rousseau's The Social Contract was the main influence; he translated this work into Spanish and used it to justify the actions of the Primera Junta. Contemporary people as Ignacio Núñez and Tomás de Anchorena acknowledged him as the translator. However, as the main page said that the work was "reprinted in Buenos Ayres", some historians doubt whether it was actually Moreno's work. Vicente Fidel López claimed that Moreno reprinted the translation made by the Spaniard Gaspar Melchor de Jovellanos, but the two translations differ. Paul Groussac thought it was a reprint of an Asturian translation, and Ricardo Levene said that Moreno was not the translator, but neither gave any indication as to who they thought had completed it. Enrique de Gandía considers that the comments of contemporary people and the lack of an earlier similar translation of Rousseau's work allow us to conclude that Moreno must have been the translator, at least until an earlier translation is found.

Despite his interest in French authors, Mariano Moreno was not Francophile or afrancesado. He kept a strong Spanish cultural heritage, and both Levene and Abelardo Ramos agree that his stay in Chuquisaca influenced him more than the books. In line with the Spanish Enlightenment, Moreno kept strong religious beliefs. He removed the chapter from Rousseau's work that is critical of religion, and never became a Freemason. He gave up his religious studies to study law and get married, but never actually became a priest, so there was no defrocking. He studied with priests such as Terrazas, who approved and perhaps even encouraged the change of vocation.

=== Physical aspect ===
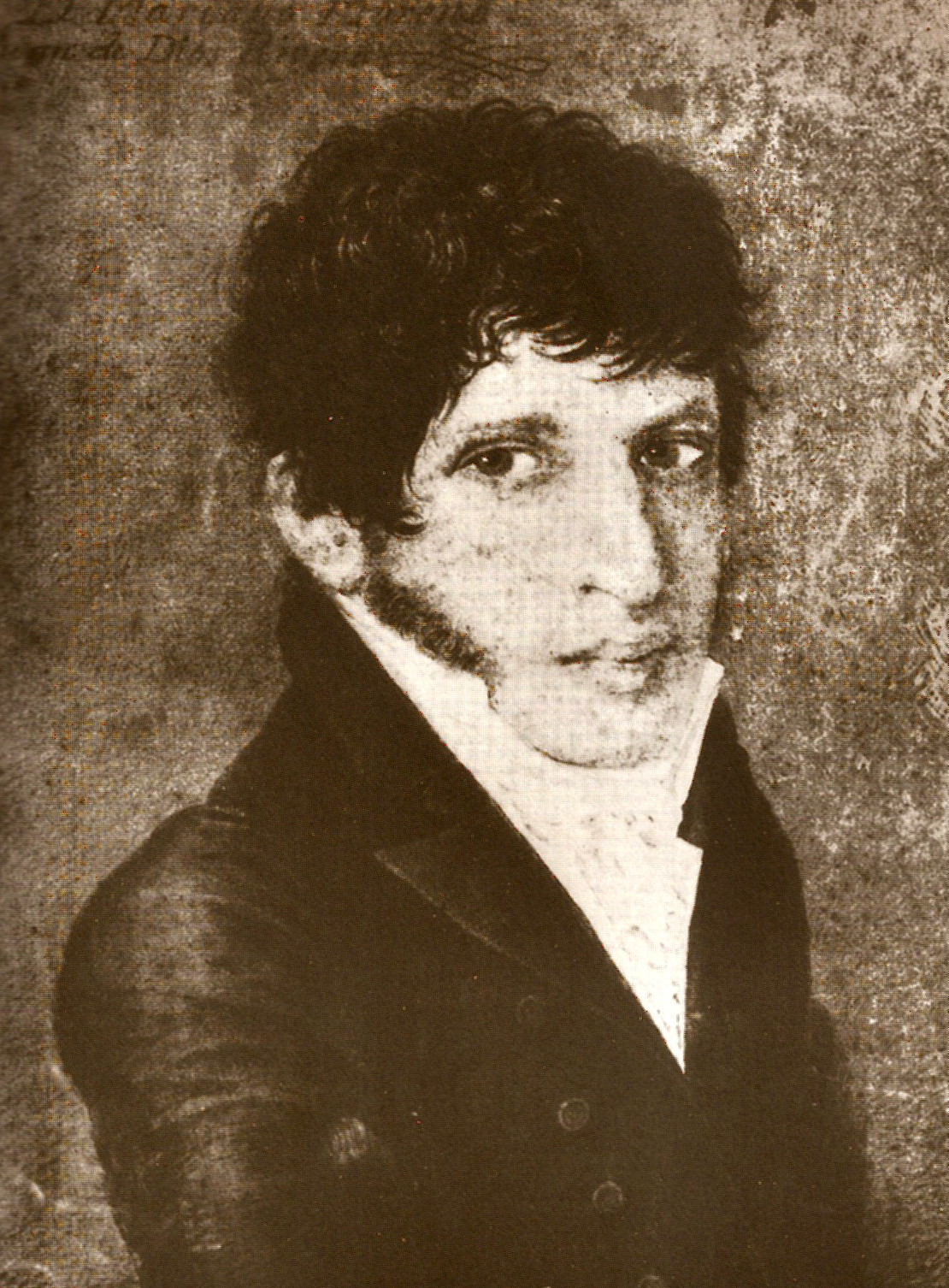
Portrait of Moreno made by painter Juan de Dios Rivera. It is thought to be a realistic representation.

The canonical image of Mariano Moreno is the one from the portrait Mariano Moreno en su mesa de trabajo (Spanish: Mariano Moreno at his work desk). It was done by the Chilean artist Pedro Subercaseaux during the centennial of the May Revolution in 1910. The historian Adolfo Carranza asked him to design various allegorical pictures of the event. Carranza belonged to the mainstream line of historians who professed great admiration for Moreno, who he described as follows: "He was the soul of the government of the revolution of May, his nerve, the distinguished statesman of the group managing the ship attacked the absolutism and doubt, anxious to reach the goal of his aspirations and his destiny. Moreno was the compass and that also grabbed the helm, as he was the strongest and the ablest of those who came to direct it". He asked for a picture that was consistent with this image. The portrait depicts him as a friendly man with an open and round face, a wide forehead, and a serene look. Subsequent interpretations, like those of Antonio Estrada, would follow this style, as would portraits of other members of the Junta. However, as this portrait was made a hundred years after the death of the subject, with no known depictions done during his lifetime, it was thus based on the artist's imagination. It was known that Moreno had clearly visible smallpox scars from the age of eight, but not to the point where they disfigured his face.

Later a portrait of Moreno was discovered that had been done from life, by the Peruvian silversmith Juan de Dios Rivera. This portrait was painted between 1808 or 1809, before Moreno's appointment as secretary of the Junta. It is now considered to be the closest representation of Moreno's real appearance. In this portrait, he is depicted with an elongated face, abundant hair, long sideburns, big eyes, and a pointy nose.

== Bibliography ==
- Balmaceda, Daniel (2010). Historias de Corceles y de Acero (in Spanish). Buenos Aires: Editorial Sudamericana. ISBN 978-950-07-3180-5.
- Chávez, Julio César (1957). Castelli, el adalid de Mayo. Buenos Aires: Ediciones Leviatan.
- many authors (1968). Crónica Histórica Argentina (in Spanish). Buenos Aires: Editorial Códex S.A.
- Ferla, Salvador (1974). Historia argentina con drama y humor (in Spanish). Buenos Aires: Granica.
- Galasso, Norberto (2004). Mariano Moreno – El sabiecito del sur. Buenos Aires: Colihue. ISBN 950-581-799-1.
- Ibarguren, Carlos (1938). Juan Manuel de Rosas: su vida, su drama, su tiempo. Buenos Aires: Editorial Sopena Argentina.
- Ibarguren, Federico (1964). Las etapas de Mayo y el verdadero Moreno. Argentina: Ediciones Theoría.
- Julio Mario Luqui-Lagleyze Lagleyze, Julio Luqui (2010). Grandes biografías de los 200 años: Mariano Moreno. Buenos Aires: Clarín. ISBN 978-987-07-0838-4.
- Justo, Liborio (1968). Nuestra patria vasalla. Buenos Aires: Editorial Schapire.
- Luna, Félix (2004). Grandes protagonistas de la Historia Argentina: Mariano Moreno (in Spanish). Buenos Aires: La Nación. ISBN 950-49-1248-6.
- Moreno, Mariano; Norberto Piñeiro; Paul Groussac (2008). Plan de Operaciones. Argentina: Ediciones Biblioteca Nacional. ISBN 978-987-9350-22-5.
- National Academy of History of Argentina (2010). Revolución en el Plata (in Spanish). Buenos Aires: Emece. ISBN 978-950-04-3258-0.
- Núñez, Ignacio (1857). Noticias históricas de la República Argentina. Buenos Aires: Impr. de Mayo.
- Pigna, Felipe (2007). Los mitos de la historia argentina (in Spanish) (26 ed.). Argentina: Grupo Editorial Norma. ISBN 978-987-545-149-0.
- Pueyrredón, Carlos A. (1953). La revolución de Mayo según amplia documentación de la época. Buenos Aires: Ediciones Peuser.
- Scenna, Miguel Ángel (2009). Mariano Moreno. Buenos Aires: H. Garetto Editor. ISBN 978-987-1494-05-4.
- Wiñazki, Miguel (2007). Moreno: El fuego que inventó la patria. Buenos Aires: Marea Editorial. ISBN 978-987-1307-01-2.
