= My Mortal Enemy =

1926 novel by Willa Cather

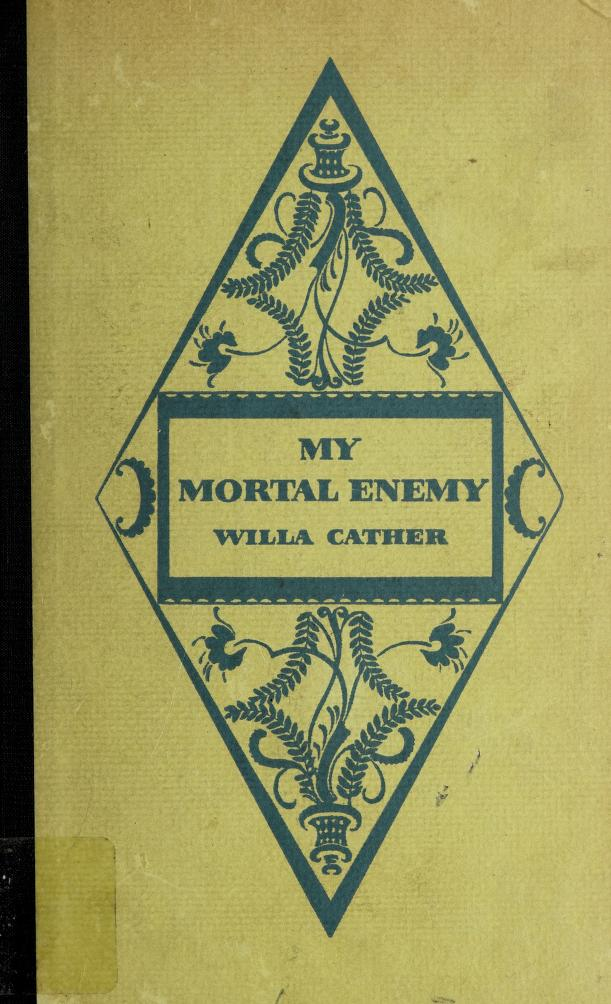
- First edition
- Author: Willa Cather
- Language: English
- Publisher: Alfred A. Knopf
- Publication date: 1926
- Publication place: United States
- Media type: Print (hardback & paperback)
- Text: My Mortal Enemy at Wikisource

My Mortal Enemy is the eighth novel by American author Willa Cather. It was first published in 1926.

== Plot summary ==
Myra Henshawe and her husband Oswald return to their fictional hometown of Parthia, Illinois, to visit their relatives. Nellie and Aunt Lydia then leave to spend the Christmas holiday in New York City with them. They live on Madison Square. They dine with Ewan Gray, a friend who has an infatuation with another actress, Esther Sinclair. Oswald receives silver buttons for his shirt from an old Western acquaintance, and asks Lydia to pretend she gave them to him to thwart his wife's jealousy. Later Myra and Nellie go to the opera; in a lodge they spot an erstwhile friend of Myra's, which makes her sad. Later they take a hansom around a park and chance upon a rich acquaintance of Myra's, which leads her to be scornful over her own poverty. They spend Christmas dinner with friends of the Henshawes, both artists and people of privilege. Later they spend New Year's Eve with artists again. A few days later Nellie witnesses the Henshawes argue; the husband takes her out to lunch. Soon after, she and her aunt are to return to Illinois. On the train, they are joined by Myra, who has argued with her husband again and is going to visit a friend in Pittsburgh for a change of scenery.

Ten years later, Nellie moved into a shabby flat in a little town on the west coast, and bumps into the Henshawes. Myra is now bedridden and Oswald works full-time; their upstairs neighbours are atrociously noisy, regardless of Myra's illness. Nellie takes to visiting her at tea-time; she also takes her out by the sea. Myra expresses her regrets over her husband. (If she had not married him, her great-uncle would have bequeathed her his fortune. Instead, she eloped and he gave it away to the church.) Oswald takes to having lunch with a young woman. Once, Nellie asks her why she is so harsh on her husband, and Myra dismisses her. Shortly after, her condition gets worse. She dismisses everyone and runs away; she is found dead by the seaside the following day. Her husband expresses no remorse about his wife; he loved her despite her difficult conduct. After her death he moves to Alaska and later Nellie hears about his death.

== Characters ==
- Myra Henshawe, maiden name Driscoll. She lives in New York City. She was brought up by her great-uncle.
- Oswald Henshawe His mother was German and his father an Ulster Protestant who didn't get on with Myra's great-uncle. He went to Harvard and then New York City.
- Aunt Lydia She has three sons.
- Cousin Bert
- Nellie Birdseye. Later Myra calls her Mrs Casey.
- Willy Bunch, the janitor's son.
- John Driscoll, Myra's father. He died when she was very young.
- Uncle Rob
- Ewan Gray, a stage actor. He is Scottish and was reportedly wild in his youth.
- Esther Sinclair, a woman of good family whom Ewan likes.
- Mrs Hewes, Madame Modjedska's housekeeper.
- Anne Aylward, a poet.
- Jefferson de Angelais, a stage actor.
- Helena Modjeska, Countess Bozenta-Chlapowska.
- Emelia, a Polish singer.
- Coquelin, an actor.
- The Poindexters, upstairs neighbours.
- Biddy Stirling, a librarian.
- Father Fay, a Catholic priest, who gives Myra the last rites.
- Billy, the son of a friend of Myra's, who killed himself at age 23 because of a 'sordid love affair'.
- A young woman whom Oswald goes to the restaurant with while his wife is ill.

== Allusions to other works ==
- The Bible is mentioned with regard to the Sacred Heart.
- Literature is mentioned with regard to Charles Perrault's Sleeping Beauty, William Shakespeare's King Lear, Richard II and King John, Heinrich Heine, and Walt Whitman.
- Drama is mentioned with regard to Sarah Bernhardt's Hamlet.
- Music is mentioned with regard to Jean de Reszke, Helena Modjeska, Ambroise Thomas's Hamlet, Vincenzo Bellini's Norma, and Franz Schubert.

== Literary significance and criticism ==
Cather scholar Laura Winters suggested that the novel 'represents the bitter apotheosis of the issues of exile Cather worked on all of her life'.

Literary analyst Merrill Skaggs identified editor Viola Roseboro' as Cather's probable inspiration for Myra Henshawe, and posited that although Cather said the inspiration for Henshawe had died in 1911, this was a reference to Roseboro' having left McClure's Magazine (former workplace of both Roseboro' and Cather) in that year.
