= Julián Álvarez (disambiguation) =

Julián Alvarez (born 2000) is an Argentine footballer.

Julián Álvarez may also refer to:

- Julián Álvarez (lawyer) (1788–1843), Argentine and Uruguayan lawyer and politician

== See also ==
- Julión Álvarez (born 1983), Mexican singer
- Julia Alvarez (born 1950), American poet, novelist, and essayist
- Julio Álvarez (born 1981), Venezuelan professional footballer
