= Groussac Refuge =

Groussac Refuge Refugio naval Groussac
- Refuge
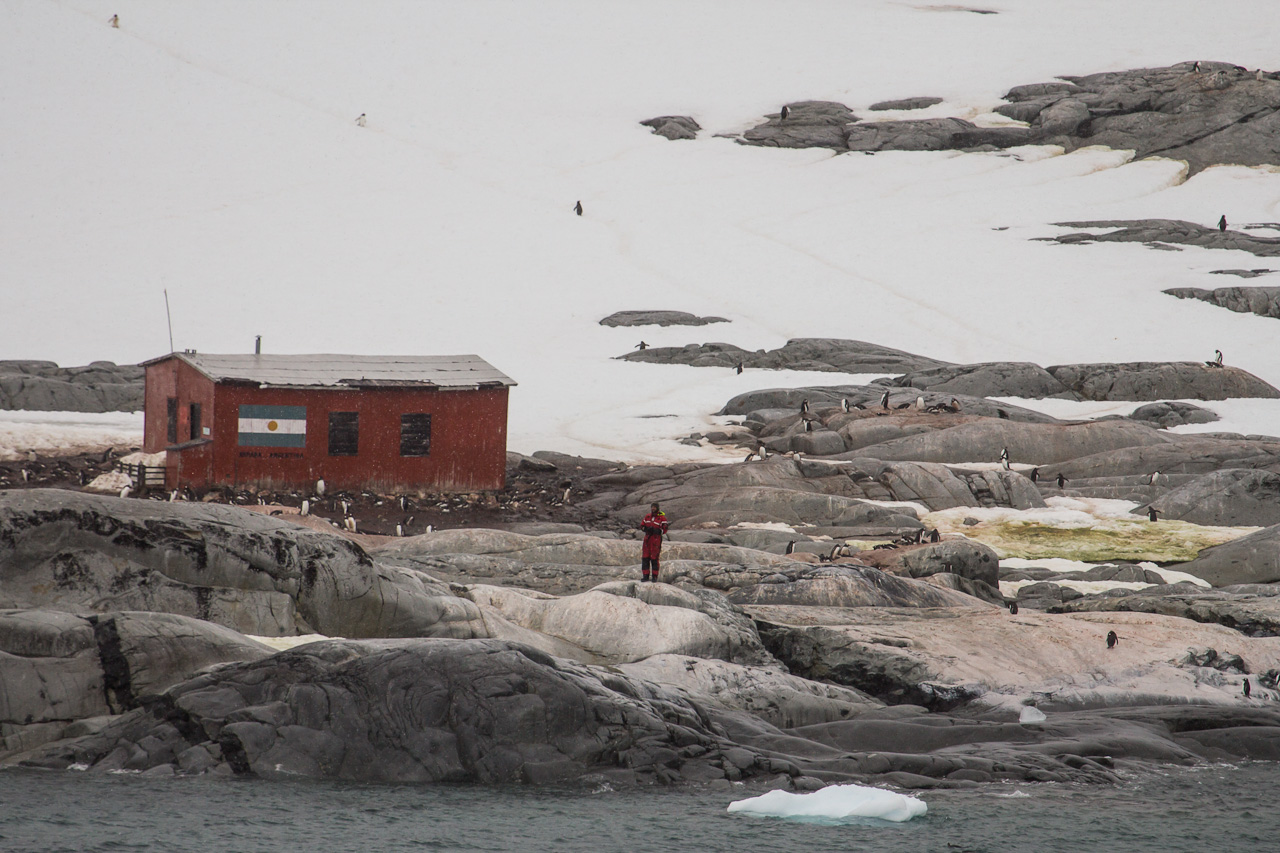
- Groussac Naval Refuge in 2013
- Country: Argentina
- Location in Antarctic Peninsula: Petermann Island; Graham Land; Antarctica
- Administered by: Argentine Navy
- Established: 1955
- Named after: Paul Groussac
- Type: Seasonal
- Status: Operational

The Groussac Refuge (Spanish: Refugio naval Groussac, originally Refugio naval Hipólito Bouchard) is an Argentine shelter in Antarctica located on the south coast of Port Circumcision, on Petermann Island, off the west coast of the Antarctic Peninsula. It was inaugurated on February 6, 1955, and is operated by the Argentine Navy.

== Location ==
The refuge sits in the middle of a colony of Antarctic gentoo penguins (Pygoscelis papua ellsworthi). This is one of the furthest south breeding locations for this species.

The average sea level in the area is 1.22 meters.

== Name ==
The refuge bears its current name in honor of Paul Groussac (1848–1929), French writer and historian based in Argentina, author of a statement on the Argentine claim to the Malvinas Islands (Falkland Islands) and biographies of Argentine heroes.

== History ==
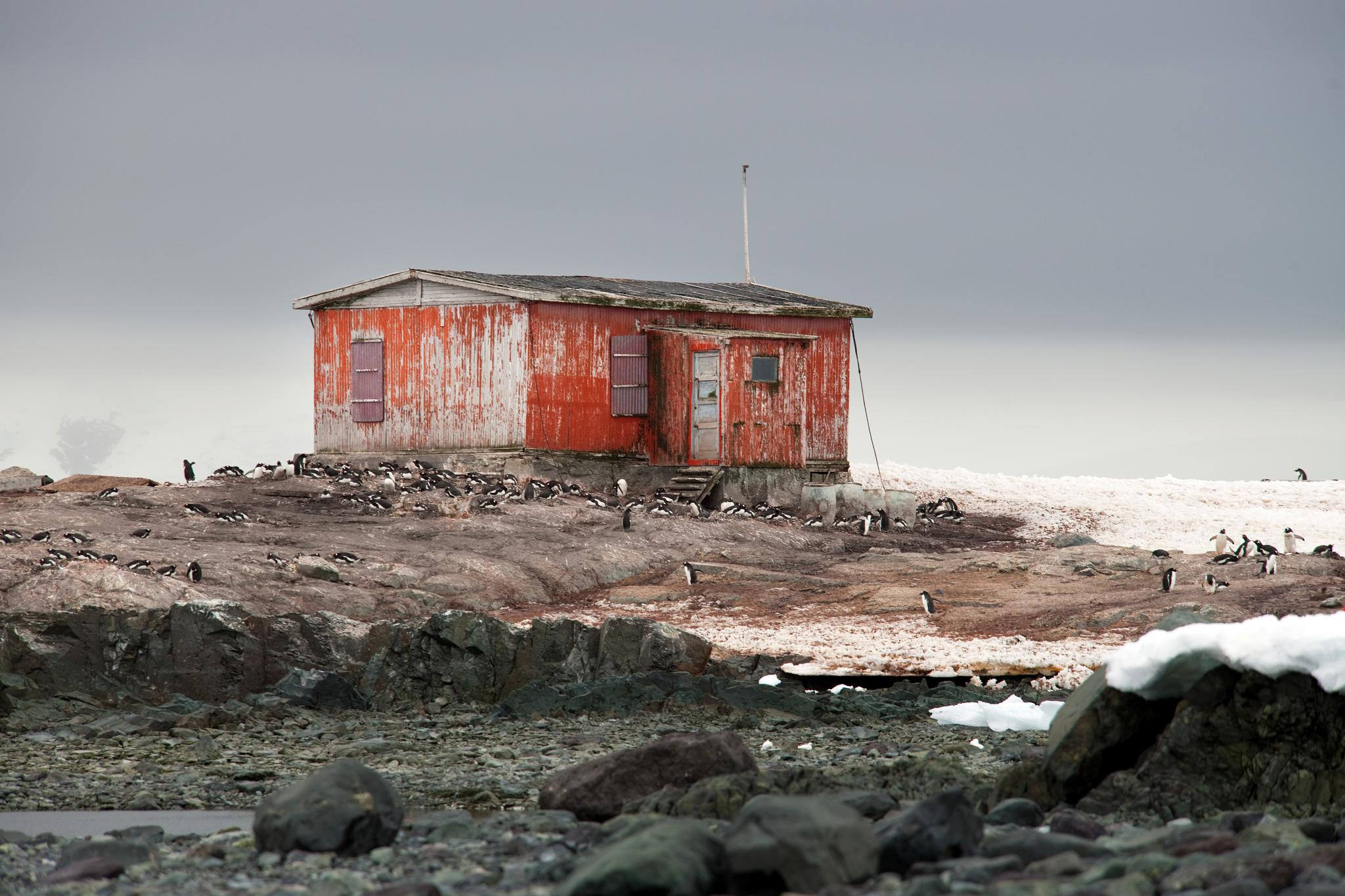
Refuge hut

The refuge consists of a wooden building with a warehouse that can store supplies for three people for three months. It was used during the summers of 1954–1955, 1956-1957 and 1957–1958, including the period of the International Geophysical Year, during which it functioned as a base for making surface meteorological observations and observations on sea level fluctuations.

Amateur radio transmissions have been made from the shelter in 1998, 1999, 2000, 2001, 2002 and 2011.

The shelter was periodically occupied by British Antarctic Survey staff from Faraday Base.

After not receiving maintenance since 2007, in January 2018 it was opened and repaired by a crew of 8 men.

== Sources ==
- Dubrovin, L.I.; Petrov, V.N. (1967), Scientific Stations in Antarctica 1882-1963. (PDF)
- Efemérides - 6 de febrero, Sitio web oficial de la Armada Argentina, archived from the original on 2015-04-18
- Faraday Station F — History, British Antarctic Survey, archived from the original on 18 May 2013
- Miguel Ángel Otero Soliño (7 May 2014), Refugio Naval Groussac en la Antártida (in Spanish)
- Tablas de marea para la Antártida (octubre 2013 - diciembre 2014) (PDF) (in Spanish), Servicio de Hidrografía Naval, p. 3, archived from the original (PDF) on 24 September 2015
- W.A.P. Worldwide Antarctic Program - W.A.C.A. Worked Antarctic Callsigns Award (PDF), Waponline, archived from the original (PDF) on 12 July 2015
