= Diego Ulloa =

Chilean footballer (born 2003)

Personal information
- Full name: Diego Ismael Ulloa Nuñez
- Date of birth: 16 June 2003 (age 23)
- Place of birth: Recoleta, Santiago, Chile
- Height: 1.78 m (5 ft 10 in)
- Position: Defender

Team information
- Current team: Colo-Colo
- Number: 26

Youth career
- Colo-Colo

Senior career*
Years	Team	Apps	(Gls)
2022–	Colo-Colo	21	(0)
2022	→ Deportes La Serena (loan)	3	(0)
2023	→ Barnechea (loan)	28	(1)
2024–2025	→ Unión La Calera (loan)	47	(1)

International career^{‡}
2021–2022	Chile U20	2	(0)
2026–	Chile	5	(1)
- * Club domestic league appearances and goals as of 13 September 2026 ‡ National team caps and goals as of 6 October 2026

Diego Ismael Ulloa Nuñez (born 16 June 2003) is a Chilean footballer who plays as a defender for Chilean Primera División side Colo-Colo and the Chile national team. Mainly a left-back, he can also operate as a centre-back.

== Club career ==
Born in Recoleta commune, Santiago de Chile, Ulloa is a product of Colo-Colo. In January 2022, Ulloa was loaned out to Deportes La Serena in the Chilean Primera División and made his professional debut in the 3–0 away loss against O'Higgins on 5 February. The next season, he was loaned out to Barnechea in the Chilean second level, with whom he got consistency.

In January 2024, Ulloa was loaned out to Unión La Calera in the Chilean top division. The next year, he continued on loan with them until the end of the season.

== International career ==
Ulloa represented the Chile national U20 team under Patricio Ormazábal in 2021 and 2022.

At senior level, Ulloa received his first call-up for the 2026 FIFA Series matches against Cape Verde and New Zealand on 27 and 30 March 2026, respectively. He made his debut in the first match by replacing Gabriel Suazo at the minute 85.

== Personal life ==
Ulloa is the nephew of the professional footballer Ignacio Núñez.

His younger brother, Cristóbal, is a left-back from the Universidad de Chile youth ranks.

== Career statistics ==
=== International ===
As of match played 6 October 2026

Appearances and goals by national team and year
National team	Year	Apps	Goals
Chile	2026	4	1
Total		4	1

Scores and results list Chile's goal tally first, score column indicates score after each Ulloa goal.

List of international goals scored by Diego Ulloa
No.	Date	Venue	Opponent	Score	Result	Competition
1	29 September 2026	Energizer Park, St. Louis, United States	United States	1–1	2–4	Friendly
