= Manuel Moreno (politician) =

Argentine politician

Manuel Moreno (1782–1857) was an Argentine politician, brother of Mariano Moreno. He was one of the founders of the Federal Party in the province of Buenos Aires.

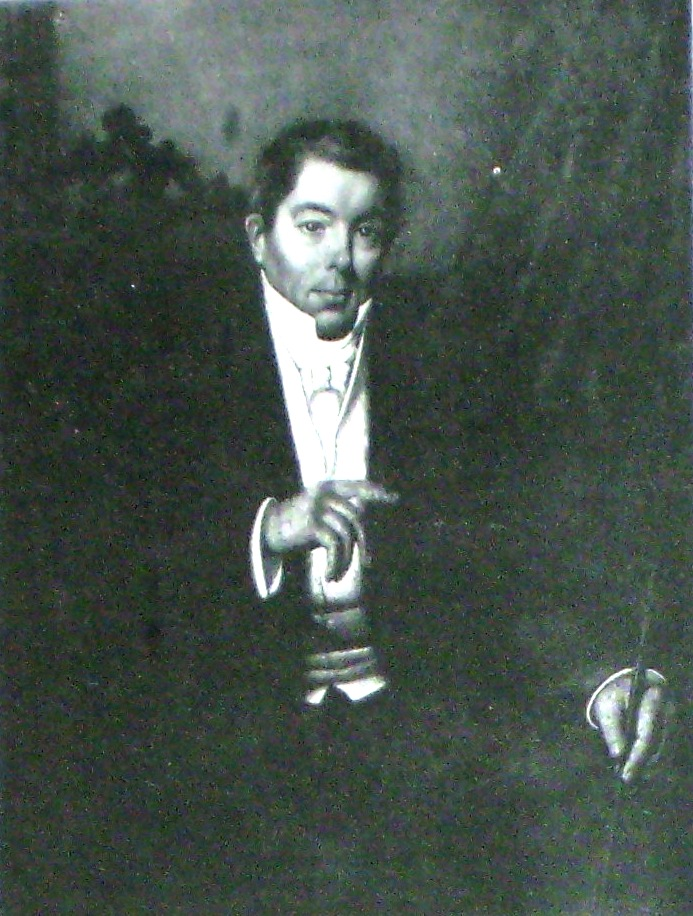
Manuel Moreno

== Biography ==
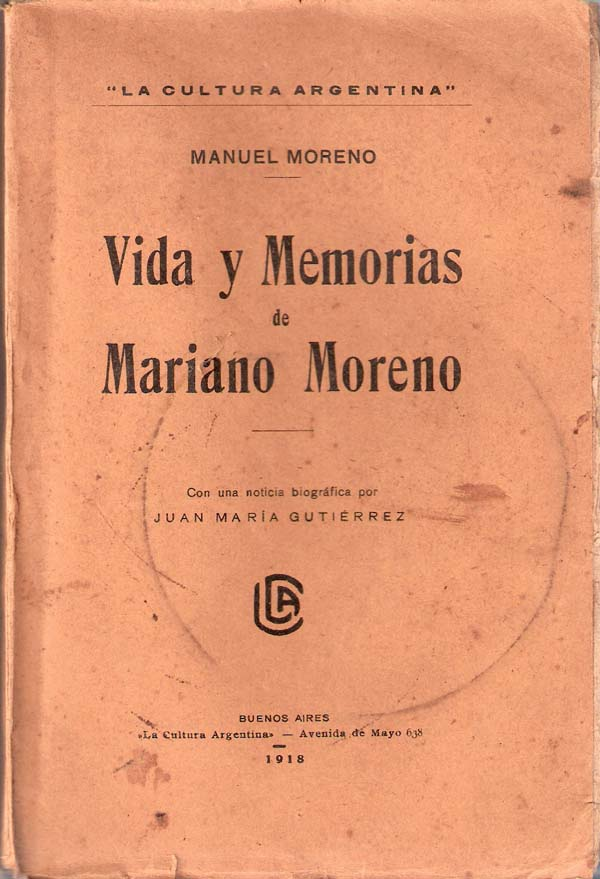
Cover of Mariano Moreno's biography by his brother Manuel Moreno

Manuel Moreno was born in Buenos Aires in 1781, and studied at Real Colegio de San Carlos. He started to work in the colonial government by 1800, and joined his brother Mariano Moreno on his mission to London. However, Mariano died on board the ship, which inspired Manuel to write a biography of his life. He wrote them quickly, in order to be able to publish them in London, and used it as a force to promote the Revolution in Europe.

He returned in 1813, and was appointed as state secretary by the Second Triumvirate. In 1817, he was jailed and banished to the United States, where he graduated in medicine at the Maryland university. He returned in 1821 and worked in the Public Library, and it is believed that he was the first person to teach about chemistry in Buenos Aires.

Later, he joined the Legislature, where he held his position for a number of terms. He represented the Banda Oriental in the Constitutional Assembly of 1824, and supported the enactment of a federalist government. Moreno was elected a Foreign Honorary Member of the American Academy of Arts and Sciences and a member of the American Antiquarian Society in 1825. He moved to England and Juan Manuel de Rosas appointed him as minister plenipotentiary in 1832. He wrote many formal complaints to the British over Argentine claims to the Falkland Islands after 1833, which were rejected by the British government. He returned to Buenos Aires in 1853, dying four years later.

== Bibliography ==
- Gelman, Jorge; Raúl Fradkin (2010). Doscientos años pensando la Revolución de Mayo. Buenos Aires: Sudamericana. pp. 52, 53. ISBN 978-950-07-3179-9.
