= Mariano Moreno en su mesa de trabajo =

Painting by Pedro Subercaseaux

Mariano Moreno at his work desk
- Mariano Moreno en su mesa de trabajo (Spanish)
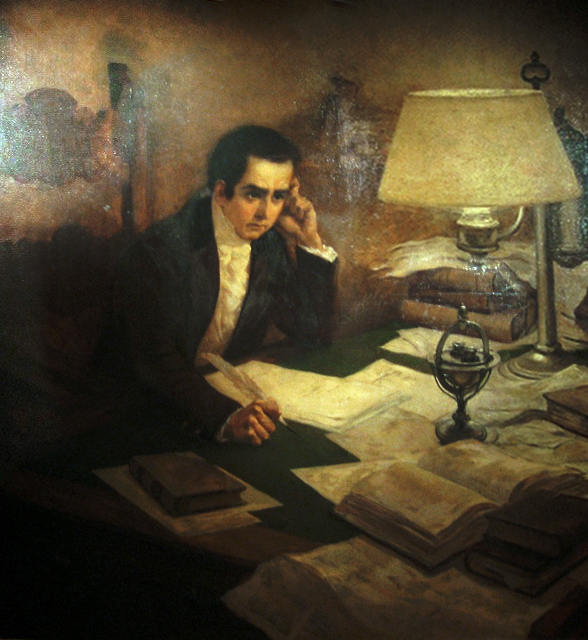
- Artist: Pedro Subercaseaux
- Location: National Historical Museum

Mariano Moreno en su mesa de trabajo (Spanish: Mariano Moreno at his work desk) is a portrait by the Chilean artist Pedro Subercaseaux. It shows the artist's interpretation of Mariano Moreno, Secretary of War of the Argentine Primera Junta, the first national government, working at his desk. It is currently regarded as the canonical image of Moreno.

== Description ==
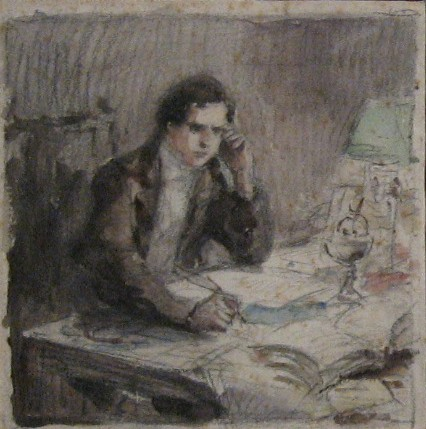
Draft version of the portrait.

The portrait was requested to Subercaseaux by Antonio Carranza in 1908, in the context of the proximity of the Argentina Centennial two years later. His instructions were that the portrait should represent Mariano Moreno while working hard, late in the night, writing with a quill, with many papers scattered around, and worried by the gravity of the measures being taken.

Subercaseaux was not very satisfied with his work, thinking that his version of Moreno was not as thin as Moreno was reported to be.

The portrait is currently kept at the National Historical Museum.

== See also ==
- Mariano Moreno
