= Tomás Guido =

Argentine general (1788–1866)

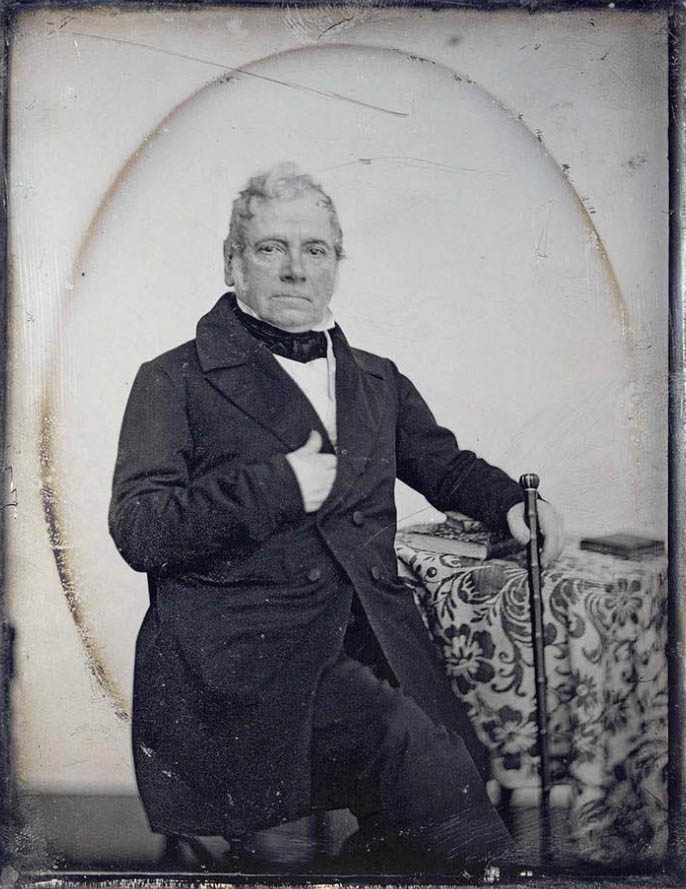
- A daguerreotype of Tomás Guido

Personal details
- Born: 1 November 1788 Buenos Aires, Viceroyalty of the Río de la Plata
- Died: 14 September 1866 (aged 77) Buenos Aires, Argentina
- Children: 4
- Occupation: Soldier, politician, diplomat

Military service
- Allegiance: Spanish Empire; United Provinces
- Years of service: 1806–?
- Rank: Brigadier general
- Battles/wars: Argentine War of Independence

Tomás Guido (1 November 1788 – 14 September 1866) was a general in the Argentine War of Independence, a diplomat and a politician.

== Early life ==
Tomás Guido was the son of a Spanish merchant Pedro Guido y Sanz and his wife Juana Aoiz y Martínez. He attended San Carlos College, but was forced to give up his studies by an economic crisis.

Guido saw his first military action in 1806 when he helped to defend Buenos Aires from the British invaders. He later went on to participate in the May Revolution in 1810.

In 1811 Guido became the secretary for Dr Mariano Moreno on his journey to England. In 1812 Guido returned to Argentina to work as a secretary in the Ministry of War, later he moved to Charcas to work as a secretary for Francisco Ortiz de Ocampo. Later he travelled to Tucumán where he joined José de San Martín y Manuel Belgrano, where he worked as the chief Secretary of the Army, working with San Martín to plan the campaign to liberate Chile and Peru.

On 20 May 1816, Guido presented Antonio González Balcarce with Memoria, which was based on his memories of conversations with San Martín in Saldán, Córdoba about the military, economic and political details of the Maitland Plan.

== Campaign of liberation in Chile and Peru ==
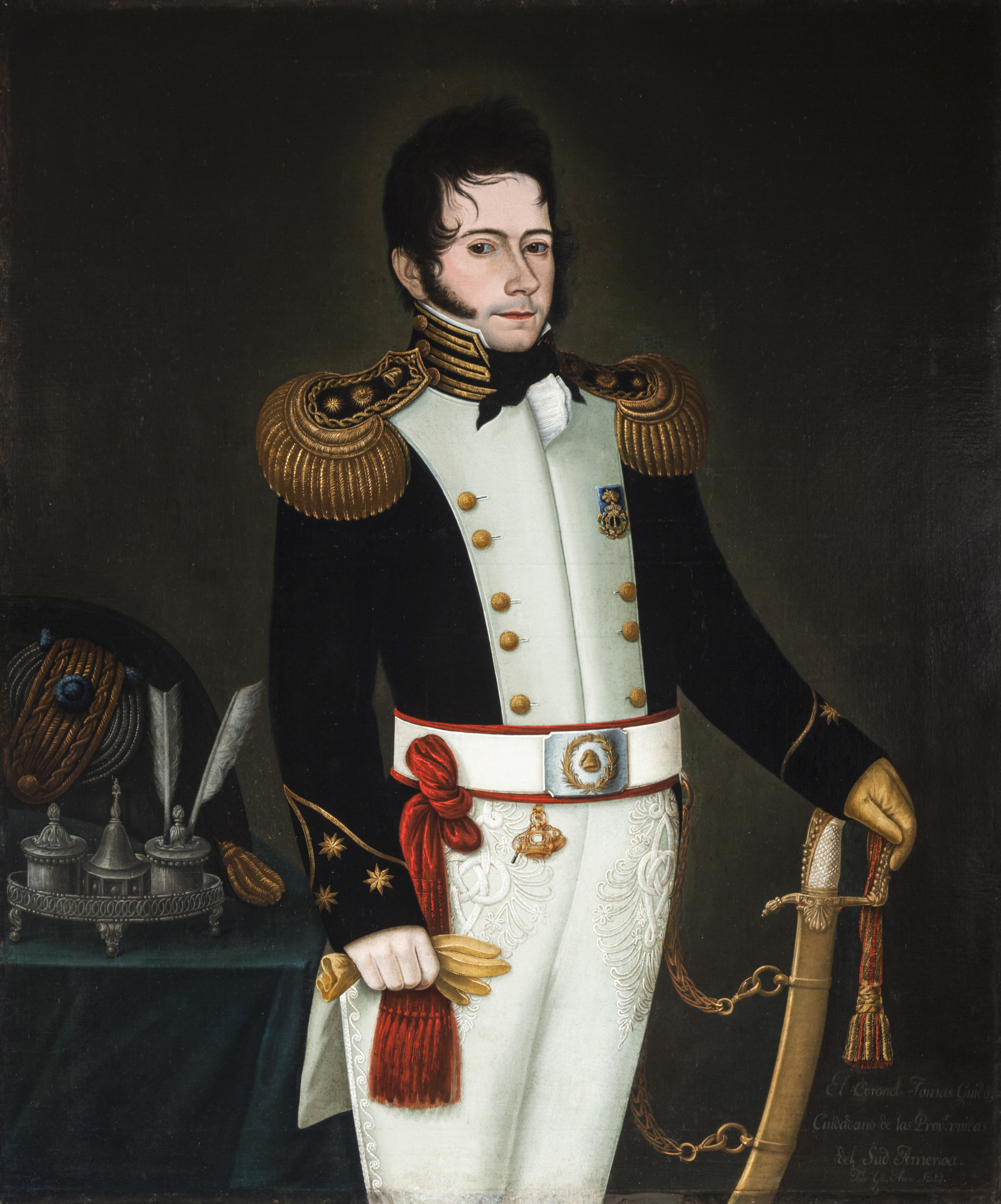
Portrait by José Gil de Castro, 1820

After the victory at the Battle of Chacabuco (12 February 1817). General San Martín named Guido as Lieutenant Colonel, but he continued doing the job of Chief Secretary of the Army and Navy. During the ceremony to mark the official declaration of Chilean independence on 12 February 1818, Guido played the role of flagbearer.

Guido then worked as a diplomat for San Martín during the effort to liberate Peru, he negotiated with the Spanish Viceroy at Miraflores before San Martín declared Peruvian Independence on 28 July 1821. Guido was at the Guayaquil Conference where the two great Liberators of South America (San Martín and Simón Bolívar) met for the only time. After San Martín left Peru, Guido stayed on, earning the titles of Supreme Military Advisor in 1823 and later Brigadier General.

== Return to Argentina ==
In 1826 Guido returned to Buenos Aires where he was appointed as Inspector of Arms in 1827 by Bernardino Rivadavia. He later served as Minister of War and Foreign Relations on three occasions with Lavalle, Viamonte and Rosas.

Between 1840 and 1851 Guido was Argentina's representative to the government of Brazil.

== Death ==
Guido died on 14 December 1866, in Buenos Aires, leaving his wife and four children.
