= María Guadalupe Cuenca =

Bolivian-born Argentine letter writer

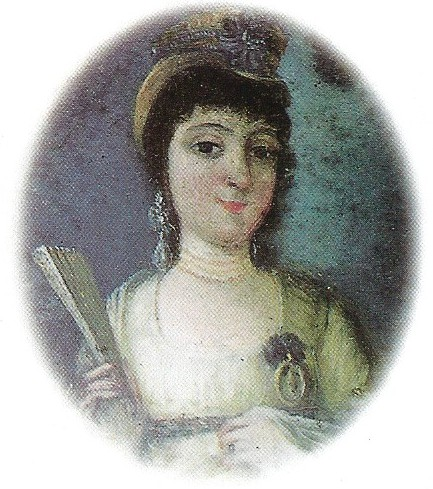
María Guadalupe Cuenca

María Guadalupe Cuenca de Moreno (1790 – September 1, 1854) was a 19th-century Upper Peru-born Argentine letter writer.

María Guadalupe Cuenca was born in Chuquisaca, Upper Peru, in 1790. After her father's death, she spent her childhood in a convent in her hometown.

On May 20, 1804, she married Mariano Moreno, whom she met while Moreno was studying law in Bolivia. After the couple had a child together, they moved to Calle de la Piedad in Buenos Aires, Argentina. A few days after Moreno left for England, Cuenca received a box which contained a pair of black gloves, a black fan, and a mourning veil. But she was never informed that Moreno died on the high seas. While waiting for news of her husband, she wrote him a ten love letters that were returned unopened. Enrique Williams Álzaga later compiled them in a book entitled Cartas que nunca llegaron (Letters that never came). After the death of her husband, Cuenca raised her son alone. Destituted, she asked the Triumvirate for a pension, and it agreed to give her a pension of 30 pesos. She died in Buenos Aires, on September 1, 1854.
