= The Representation of the Landowners =

1809 economic report by Mariano Moreno

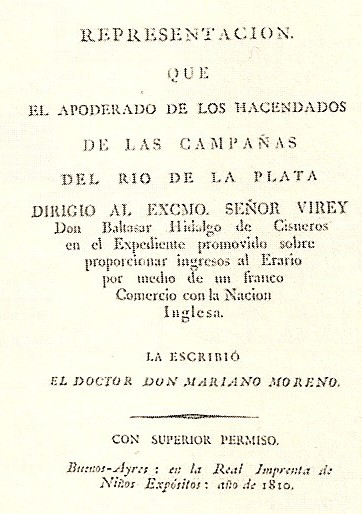
- Original title: La Representación de los Hacendados
- Created: 1809
- Author: Mariano Moreno
- Purpose: To request free trade in the viceroyalty of the Río de la Plata

The Representation of the Landowners (Spanish: La Representación de los Hacendados) is an 1809 economic report written by Mariano Moreno, that described the economy of the Viceroyalty of the Río de la Plata. It was written by Moreno on behalf of the hacendados (owners of haciendas), to request then viceroy Baltasar Hidalgo de Cisneros to reconsider the annulment of free trade he had decided on a short time earlier. It is considered the most complete economic overview from the times of the colony.

== Context ==
The Viceroyalty of the Río de la Plata, according to the laws of Indias, was only allowed to trade with their metropoli, Spain. But commerce with Spain was scarce: other ports took priority, Spain was at war, and Spanish ships were attacked by pirates. To get the products needed, Buenos Aires smuggled them from the British and the Portuguese colonies, despite the laws forbidding it. This led to the creation of two main antagonist groups: hacendados that manufactured leather products and wanted free trade to be able to sell their productions, and retailers that sold the smuggled products. The latter opposed free trade, because if it was allowed, then they would have had to sell them at lower prices.

In economic terms, given the difficulties and costs of trade with Spain, Cisneros accepted the proposal of Mariano Moreno and established on November 6, 1809, the free trade agreements with other powers. The main beneficiaries were Britain and livestock sectors, exporting hides. However, traders who profited from smuggling asked Cisneros to set aside free trade, which he agreed to do in order to keep their support. This led in turn to the British, Mac Kinnon and Captain Doyle as representatives, to demand a review of the measure, invoking the character of allies against Napoleon in Spain and Britain. Most hacendados (owners of haciendas) also desired the measure to be reviewed, and due to their little political strength they requested the lawyer Mariano Moreno to petition to the viceroy in their behalf.

== Description ==
The document was, according to modern historians, the most complete economic overview from the times of the colony. Moreno formulated strong critics to the colonial economic system, with strong influences of the economic philosophers of the time. The main idea was that free trade with Britain should be allowed. However, "free trade" should be understood as relaxing the rigid Spanish rules towards international commerce. It proposed that commerce should be allowed for certain products, but still keeping protectionist taxes over the clothes that may harm the industries as Cochabamba.

Moreno employed sarcasm frequently to justify his ideas. For example, a part of the document says:

Can there be something more ridiculous than the sight of a retailer that defends with great voices the observance of laws that forbid foreign commerce at the door of his shop, where there aren't but English productions of clandestine introduction?

== Consequences ==
As a result of the report, Cisneros allowed free trade but in a limited manner.

== Historical perspective ==
The Representation is one of the axes around the historiographic disputes about Mariano Moreno. Ricardo Levene, with liberal ideas, described it with unusual praisings and thought it as a direct antecedent of the May Revolution. On the contrary, revisionist authors would condemn it as a tool to promote foreign intervention in the local economy. Both approaches would become outdated later. It is now known that Mariano Moreno did not write the Representation out of his own initiative, but as a lawyer representing a client. The authorship by Moreno is now disputed: Paul Groussac noted that Mariano Moreno did not have instruction as an economist, whereas Manuel Belgrano had studied the topic in-depth and had written an essay he intended to give to the viceroy. This, as well as an influence from the physiocratic doctrine and some grammar inflexions similar to those of Belgrano, suggest that he may be the author, or that Moreno worked over a work started by Belgrano. Belgrano wouldn't have been able to present the report himself because of having a public office in the consulate, and his past opposition to Cisneros may have risked the project from being denied for political reasons.

== Bibliography ==
- Luna, Félix (2004). Grandes protagonistas de la Historia Argentina - Mariano Moreno. Buenos Aires: Planeta. ISBN 950-49-1248-6.
- Scenna, Miguel Ángel (2009). Mariano Moreno. Buenos Aires: H. Garetto Editor. ISBN 978-987-1494-05-4.
