= Julián Álvarez (lawyer) =

Argentine statesman (1788–1843)

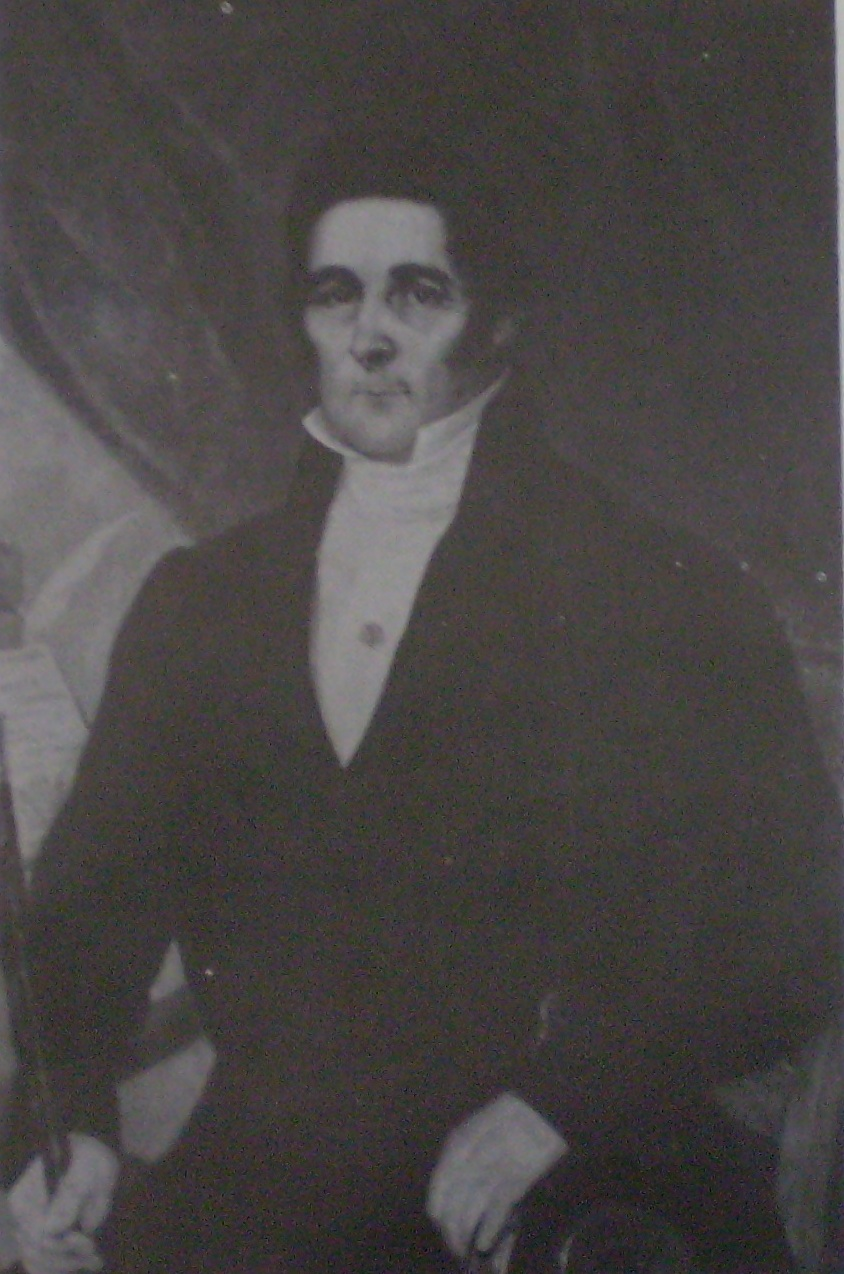
- Oil portrait of Julián Álvarez, by C. Gallino
- Born: Julián Baltasar Mariano José Luis de la Santísima Trinidad Álvarez; January 9, 1788; Buenos Aires, Viceroyalty of the Río de la Plata
- Died: November 25, 1843 (aged 55); Montevideo, Uruguay
- Occupations: Lawyer, politician
- Spouse: María Pascuala Obes
- Children: Amelia, Estanislada, Julián, Felicia, Consolación, Miguel, Ana Marquesa, Saturnino, Máximo, Cayetano
- Parent(s): Ana María Perdriel; Saturnino José Álvarez

Julián Baltasar Mariano José Luis de la Santísima Trinidad Álvarez (Buenos Aires, 8 January 1788 – Montevideo, 25 November 1843) was an Argentine and Uruguayan lawyer and politician.

== Biography ==
His father Saturnino José Álvarez, was a successful merchant, and also Treasurer of Commerce of the city of Buenos Aires. Julián Álvarez studied at the Real Colegio de San Carlos later attending the University of Charcas, where he obtained a law degree.

He took part in the May Revolution and was one of the signatories of the populous petition to the Viceroy of May 25, 1810.

After the defeat, exile and death of Mariano Moreno, he headed the "Sociedad Patriótica", the most liberal political group in Buenos Aires. He was arrested during the revolution of April 1811, but soon regained his freedom. Álvarez supported the creation of the First Triumvirate and worked in its secretariat under Bernardino Rivadavia.

As a ranking member of the Masonic Lodge Independencia de Buenos Aires in 1812, he received General José de San Martín at his arrival from Europe with the members of the Lautaro Lodge, which he joined. He was a representative to the short-lived Assembly of 1812.

He supported the Second Triumvirate, and was arrested for a short time after turning around and requesting its dissolution. The Supreme Director Gervasio Antonio de Posadas named him as Deputy Secretary of State, supporting the work of Nicolás de Herrera.

After the fall of Supreme Director Carlos María de Alvear, he left politics for a period of time.

In 1816 he took part in the revival of the Lautaro Lodge, now called "Ministerial Lodge", directed by Secretary Juan Gregorio García de Tagle, and supported Juan Martín de Pueyrredón politically. Between 1815 and 1820 he also directed the Gazeta de Buenos Ayres newspaper. In 1819 he was sent as representative of Pueyrredón to Estanislao López, who was becoming a dangerous political enemy.

The year 1820 was politically a very troublesome period in the young country of Argentina. At the beginning of the year during what is called the Anarchy of the Year XX, governor Manuel de Sarratea put him in jail at the request of López. He escaped, in the midst of the political chaos of the city and a few months later he went to Montevideo (Uruguay).

Álvarez supported the Empire of Brazil over the Cisplatine Province (today's Uruguay) and worked at several government posts during the government of Carlos Federico Lecor. When the province seceded from Argentina and Brazil to become Uruguay, he was a member of the Constitutional Congress of the new country for San José de Mayo (1830). Since 1829 he was editor of the "El Constitucional" newspaper in Canelones.

On 24 November 1811 he married María Pascuala Obes in Buenos Aires, sister of Lucas Obes. In the first decade of the independence of Uruguay, he was part of the group known as "The Five Brothers", which had great influence during the presidency of Fructuoso Rivera. From 1831 Álvarez was President of the Supreme Court of Uruguay.

During the Uruguayan Civil War, he was a member of the Gobierno de la Defensa, and was three times President of the Chamber of Deputies of Uruguay from 1841 to 1843.

His children married into prominent families of Argentina and Uruguay. His daughters, first Felicia and after her death, her sister Estanislada, married General Juan Andrés Gelly y Obes. His daughter Amelia married the medical doctor and Argentine politician Ireneo Portela while he was in exile in Uruguay and Julián Álvarez was still alive. His daughter Consolación married politician Juan Pedro Ramírez. Ana Marquesa married Lucas Herrera y Obes. Máximo married the only daughter of the first marriage of Ireneo Portela, Juana Isabel Portela.

A street in Buenos Aires carries Julián Álvarez's name.
