= Ignacio Núñez =

Chilean footballer

Personal information
- Full name: Ignacio Antonio Núñez Estrada
- Date of birth: 15 January 1999 (age 27)
- Place of birth: Recoleta, Santiago, Chile
- Height: 1.70 m (5 ft 7 in)
- Position: Midfielder

Team information
- Current team: Unión Española
- Number: 14

Youth career
- 2011–2018: Unión Española

Senior career*
Years	Team	Apps	(Gls)
2018–	Unión Española	96	(4)
2022	→ Santiago Morning (loan)	22	(0)

International career
2017–2018	Chile U20		
- * Club domestic league appearances and goals as of 3 September 2025

Ignacio Antonio Núñez Estrada (born 15 January 1999) is a Chilean footballer who plays as a midfielder for Chilean Primera División side Unión Española.

== Club career ==
Born in Recoleta commune, Santiago de Chile, Núñez joined the Unión Española youth ranks at the aged of 12 and became the team captain at all ranks. He was promoted to the first team in 2018 and made his professional debut in the 2–4 loss against Audax Italiano on 22 July for the 2018 Chilean Primera División.

In 2022, Núñez was loaned out to Santiago Morning in the Primera B de Chile.

== International career ==
Núñez represented the Chile national U20 team under Héctor Robles in friendlies in 2017 and 2018.

== Personal life ==
Núñez is the uncle of the footballer Diego Ulloa.
