= Julio Mario Luqui-Lagleyze =

Argentine historian

Julio Mario Luqui-Lagleyze is an Argentine historian. Born in Buenos Aires in 1959 received a degree in history in 1982. He specializes in Hispano-American Military and Naval History and Military Museology. He is currently studying for his PhD in history at the Universidad Católica Argentina.

In 2004, he received the Primer Premio “Ejército 2004” Award in the Research Area, granted by the Department of Defense (Spain) for his work: “Por el rey, la Fe y la Patria” (For the King, the Faith and the Homeland) a deep study on the Royalist Army during the South America Independence Wars.

== Research and Teaching activities ==
He conducted research in archives and museums throughout America and Spain enabling contributions to South American military history and in particular to Hispano-American Uniformology.

=== Teaching ===
- Professor at the Argentine Navy, serves as adviser to the Division of Historical Research Department Naval Historical Studies since 1989.
- Head of the Department of Historical Research of the Department of Historical Studies of the Argentine Air Force from 1983 to 1988
- Regent in Charge of the Office of the National School of Museology of Buenos Aires, under the National Commission for Museums and Monuments and Historical Sites from 1992 to 1994.
- He was also professor of several departments at the National School of Museology of Buenos Aires from 1983 to 1994 and has formed twelve museologists' promotions, many of whom play leading roles at specialized museums in Argentina and abroad.

=== Museums ===
He has been an adviser to museums, cataloging and classifying collections, in particular military uniforms collections. He also continuously delivers lectures on military, naval and maritime topics, train museums technical staff and advises on museum exhibitions.

==== Argentina ====
- Complejo Museográfico Enrique Udaondo
- Museo Histórico Nacional
- Museo Histórico Regional de Jujuy y Archivo Histórico Provincial de Jujuy
- Museo Histórico Municipal de Rosario “Dr. Julio Marc”.
- Museo de Armas de la Nación
- Museo de la Aviación de Ejército
- Museo de la Patagonia
- Museo del Pasado Cuyano – Mendoza.

==== Bolivia ====
Archivo Histórico de Potosí y Museo de la Casa de Moneda de Potosí.

==== Chile ====
Archivo General de la Nación - Santiago Museo Histórico Nacional - Santiago Museo Nacional de Bellas Artes – Santiago

==== Ecuador ====
Archivo Nacional del Ecuador, Quito. Casa de la Cultura Ecuatoriana, Quito. Museo Gijón Caamaño de la Universidad Católica del Ecuador, Quito.

==== Spain ====
Archivo del Palacio Real de Madrid Archivo del Servicio Histórico Militar, Madrid Archivo Militar del Alcázar de Segovia Museo del Ejército de Madrid. Museo Naval de Madrid.

==== Mexico ====
Archivo General de la Nación – México DF Museo Histórico Nacional del Castillo de Chapultepec – México DF. Museo Nacional de Antropología y Arqueología –México DF.

==== Perú ====
Archivo General de la Nación – Lima. Archivo Histórico Militar del Perú – Lima Archivo de la Marina del Perú – Callao Museo Aeronáutico del Perú Museo Nacional de Historia –Lima. Museo Nacional de Arte – Lima. Museo Nacional de Antropología - Lima Museo Histórico Militar del Real Felipe. Museo Naval del Callao. Archivo Histórico del Cuzco Museo Histórico Regional del Cuzco Museo de Arte Hispanoamericano del Cuzco.

==== Uruguay ====
Archivo General de la Nación – Montevideo Museo Histórico Nacional – Montevideo. Museo Romántico de Montevideo

==== Venezuela ====
Archivo General de la Nación – Caracas. Academia Nacional de la Historia - Caracas Museo Bolivariano – Caracas Museo Casa Natal de Bolivar – Caracas Museo de Arte Contemporáneo – Caracas Museo de Bellas Artes - Galería Nacional Caracas Museo Casa de Paez – Valencia Museo de la Fortaleza de Pampatar - Isla de Margarita.

=== Television ===
As historian he participated in several TV documentaries, among them the following ones:

San Martín's battles - San Lorenzo on YouTube
San Martín's battles - The Andes crossing on YouTube

== Institutions ==
He is member or the following institutions:

- Former member of the scientific department of the Foundation for the Preservation Subacuatic Cultural Heritage (ALBENGA) and is co-director of several research projects conducted in various locations in Argentina from 1993 to 2000.
- Academic Fellow of the Instituto Nacional Sanmartiniano of Argentina since 1996.
- Member of the Military History Group of the Argentine National Academy of History since 1994.
- Fellow of the Brown National Institute of Argentina, and former Head Secretary.
- Founding member of the Argentine Committee of Military History, an affiliate of the International Commission of Military History based in Bern, Switzerland.
- Fellow of the Argentine Army Institute of Military History, since 2010.
- Founding and board member of HISTARMAR FOUNDATION, 2010.
- Founding member, Fellow and Correspondent of the following Institutions, Argentine and American Commissions:
- Academia de Estudios Históricos del Partido de Vicente López, 1986
- Instituto Argentino de Historia Militar - Fundador - 1989.
- Instituto de Estudios Históricos Aeroespaciales del Perú - MC - 1985
- Instituto de Estudios Históricos Aeronáuticos de Chile - MC - 1987.
- Instituto de Historia Aeronáutica y Espacial del Uruguay. - MC -1987.
- Centro de Estudios Históricos Militares del Perú - MC 1994.
- Instituto Sanmartiniano del Perú – MC 1998
- Instituto Bonaerense de Numismática y Antigüedades - MN 1996
- Sociedad Argentina de Historiadores – MN 1986
- Unión de Cóndores de las Américas – Diploma de Honor 1993.

== Books and publications ==
01 - La Guerra de las Malvinas (I) Ejércitos.

Ediciones Oplos, Cuadernos de Historia Militar, Buenos Aires 1990.

02 - El Ejército Realista en la Guerra de Independencia.

Instituto Nacional Sanmartiniano, Buenos Aires 1995.
Declared of Regional Interest by the Santa Fe Province Department of Education

03 - La Fragata Libertad, Embajadora Argentina en los mares del Mundo

Ed. Manrique Zago, Bs. As. 1995. Coautor.

04 - Los Cuerpos Militares en la Historia Argentina 1550–1950

Instituto Nacional Sanmartiniano, Bs.As. 1995.
Fruit of personal research in Argentine Museums and Archives.

05 - Manuel Belgrano, Los Ideales de la Patria

Ed. Manrique Zago, Buenos Aires 1995. Coautor.

06 - Historia y Campañas del Ejército Realista 1810–1820

Instituto Nacional Sanmartiniano Buenos Aires 1997.

07 - La Logia militar Realista y la Independencia del Perú

Lecture published by the Instituto Nacional Sanmartiniano, 1997

08 - Los Realistas, 1810 1826

Ed. Quirón, Valladolid (España) 1998

09 - José de San Martín Libertador de América

Ed. Manrique Zago, 3ra edición 1998. (coautor)

10 - Los Edecanes del Presidente

Edivern 2000, para la Casa Militar de la Presidencia de la Nación.

11 - Historia del Regimiento de Infantería N° 1 “Patricios”

contribution to the historic uniforms and flags. Edivern 2001.

12 - Por el Rey la Fe y la Patria (1º Premio Ejército 2004)

Publicaciones de Defensa – Madrid 2006.

13 - Las Batallas de San Martín

6 DVD and books, Diario Clarín 2007/2008.

14/ 17 - Grandes Batallas de la Historia (colección 20 títulos)

deputy director for the serie and author of 4 books. Berlín 1945, Trafalgar, Ayacucho, Cartagena de Indias, Editorial Planeta Argentina, published in 2007 and 2008.

18 - La ruta de la Libertad –camino de los Patos, San Juan

Ed. GMLTV, 2010.

19 - Historia de los Uniformes Navales Argentinos, ARA

DEHN, Buenos Aires. 2010.

20 – Revolución en el Plata –protagonistas de Mayo de 1810

Academia Nacional de la Historia – Emecé, Buenos Aires 2010. coautor.

21 - Grandes Biografías de los 200 años

12 books and 12 DVD, Clarín 2010, adviser for históric, illustrations and the collection in general.

22 - Grandes Batallas Argentinas - 12 fasciculos, Diario Clarín, 2012

Co-author with Miguel Angel De Marco
