= Gazeta de Buenos-Ayres =

Former newspaper in Argentina (1810–21)

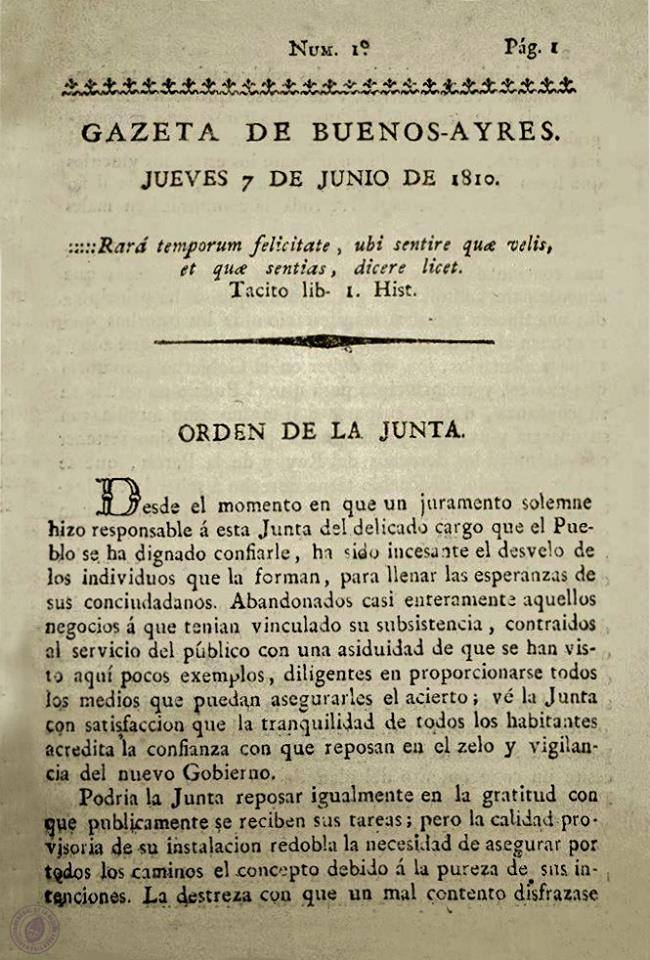
- First issue of the Gazeta de Buenos Aires.
- Type: Weekly newspaper
- Founder: Mariano Moreno
- Founded: June 7, 1810
- Ceased publication: 1821
- Language: Spanish
- Headquarters: Buenos Aires

The Gazeta de Buenos-Ayres (sic) (English: Buenos Aires gazette) was a newspaper originating in Buenos Aires, United Provinces of the Río de la Plata, in 1810. It was initially used to give publicity to the government actions of the Primera Junta, the first post-colonial Argentine government. In the beginning it was written by Mariano Moreno, with the aid of the priest Manuel Alberti; Manuel Belgrano and Juan José Castelli were also part of its staff.

It was organized on June 2, 1810, and the first issue was released the following June 7; the Gazeta was published each week afterwards. The date 7 June has been honored in Argentina as Día del Periodista, "Journalist's Day", since 1938. The Gazeta provided information about new laws, the development of the Peninsular War and the Argentine War of Independence, and served as a vehicle for political thought. The government ordered that the newspaper be read aloud at chapels after mass celebrations, because of the high illiteracy rate among the population.

It was closed by the minister of government to Buenos Aires, Bernardino Rivadavia, in 1821.

== Writers ==
- Mariano Moreno (1810)
- Gregorio Funes (1810–)
- Pedro José Agrelo (1811)
- Vicente Pazos Silva (1811–1812)
- Vicente Pazos Silva (Wednesday edition) and Bernardo de Monteagudo (Friday edition) (1812–1812)
- Manuel José García (1812– )
- Emiliano Medrano (1812–1815)
- Camilo Henríquez (1815)
- Julián Álvarez (1815–1820)
- Bernardo Vélez (1820)
- Manuel Antonio Castro (1820–1821)

== Bibliography ==
- Balmaceda, Daniel (2010). Historias de Corceles y de Acero (in Spanish). Buenos Aires: Editorial Sudamericana. ISBN 978-950-07-3180-5.
