= Coquelin =

Coquelin is a French surname. Notable people with the surname include:

- Benoît-Constant Coquelin (1841–1909), French actor
- Charles Coquelin (1802–1852), French economist
- Ernest Alexandre Honoré Coquelin (1848–1909), French actor, brother of Benoît-Constant
- Francis Coquelin (born 1991), French footballer
- Jean Coquelin (1865–1944), French actor, son of Benoît-Constant
- Pierre Coquelin de Lisle (1900–1980), French sports shooter
