= Ricardo Levene =

Argentine historian

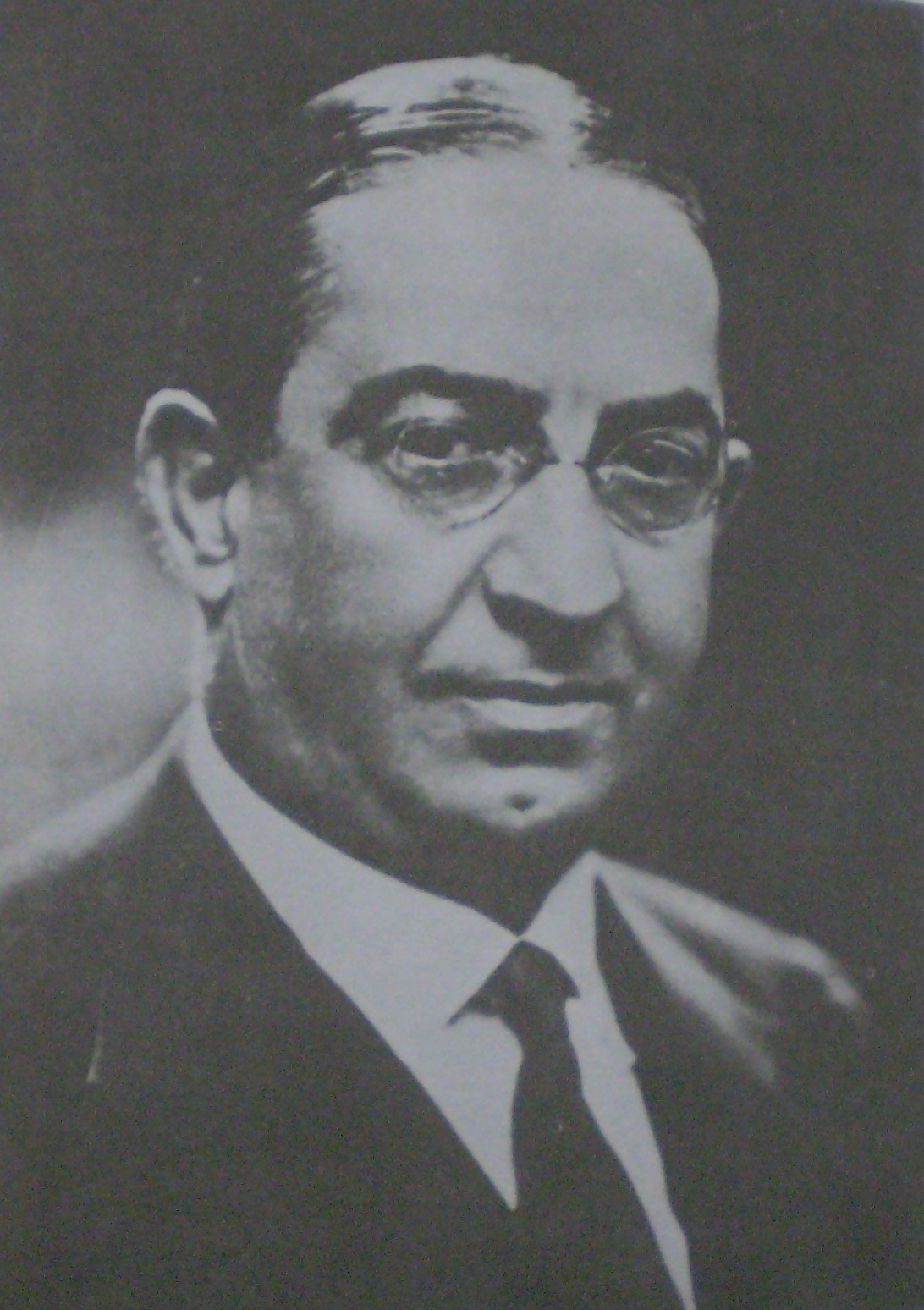
Image of Ricardo Levene

Ricardo Levene (Buenos Aires, February 7, 1885-Buenos Aires, March 13, 1959) was an Argentine historian and one of the founders of the Nueva Escuela Histórica. The Nueva Escuela Histórica sought to professionalize and apply the scientific method to history studies and thus leave behind a long period during which history publications tended to be philosophical or sociological essays. In the 1930s he opposed the so-called Argentine revisionists. He was close Agustín Pedro Justo who served as the president of Argentina from 1932 to 1938. In his 1951 essay Las Indias no eran colonias he posited that Spanish possessions in America were never colonies, this being a major contribution to the pink legend historiography.
