= Paul Groussac =

Argentine writer and historian (1848-1929)

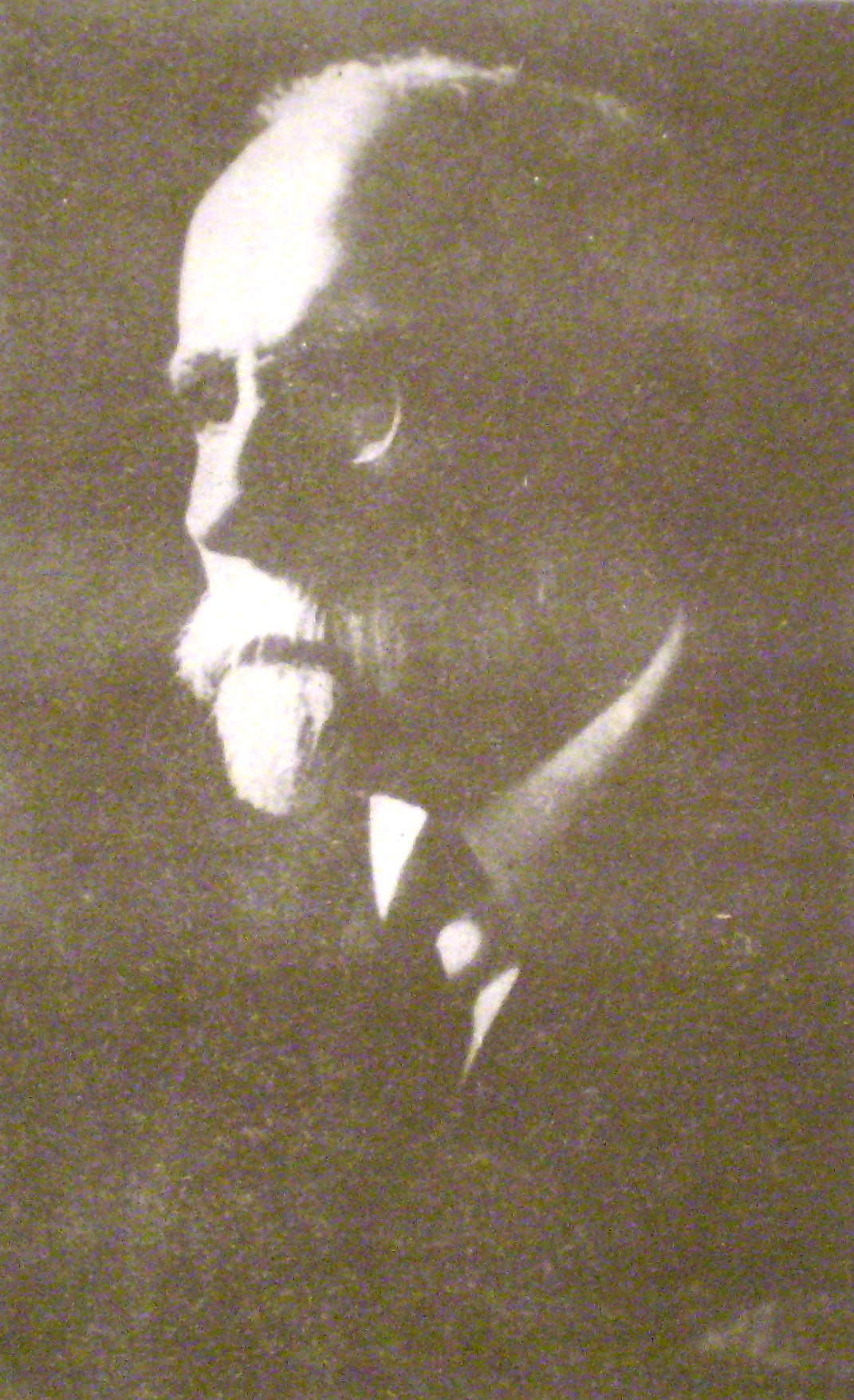
- Born: February 15, 1848; Toulouse, France
- Died: June 27, 1929 (aged 81); Buenos Aires, Argentina
- Occupation: Historian

Paul-François Groussac (February 15, 1848 – June 27, 1929) was a French-born Argentine writer, literary critic, historian, and librarian.

== Biography ==
Groussac was born in Toulouse to Pierre Groussac, the scion of an old Languedocian family, and Catherine (née Deval). As a young man, Groussac studied classics in his native Toulouse. He was admitted to the École Navale in 1865, but chose not to pursue a naval career. The next year he moved to Buenos Aires, which would remain his home for the rest of his life. Over the next seventeen years, he worked as a professor, directed the Escuela Normal de Tucumán, and served as inspector general of the national colleges. In 1883 he made a trip to France. After his return, in 1885, he was designated inspector of education and head of the Biblioteca Nacional. He would hold this position until his death forty-four years later.

His most notable works are La Biblioteca (1896) and Anales de la Biblioteca (1900), which were anthologies of critical essays, historical accounts of the library, and documents pertaining to the history of the Río de la Plata region. As director of the literary journal SudAmérica, Groussac became a central figure in the Argentine literary world. His works, including Studies of Argentine History, Historical Essay on Tucumán, and Mendoza and Garay, are characterized by their factual richness, vivid depiction of characters and their environment, and their lucid and conscientious style. Groussac's other main works include Forbidden Fruit, Argentine Tales, The Divisa Punzó, and Literary Criticism and the Malvinas Islands.

Groussac's posthumous reputation was bolstered by his frequent mention in the critical essays of fellow Argentine librarian Jorge Luis Borges, who also wrote his obituary. In his autobiographical essay La Ceguera ("Blindness"), Borges spoke of Groussac's influence on Alfonso Reyes, whom he held in great esteem: "Alfonso Reyes, the greatest prose writer in the Spanish language of any age, said to me: 'Groussac, who was French, taught me how to write in Spanish'". (Siete Noches. Fondo de Cultura Economica, Mexico, 1980, p. 156.) As a critic, he was notorious for his ruthless and intractable temperament, and for his withering mordancy. Borges analyzed some of Groussac's literary insults in his 1933 Sur essay Arte de injuriar (translated as "The Art of Verbal Abuse").

Groussac and Borges shared a few biographical parallels as well: between 1955 and 1973, Borges occupied Groussac's old position at the Biblioteca Nacional. Both men also suffered from poor eyesight, and both were completely blind by the end of their respective tenures as chief librarian.

== Works ==
- Estado actual de la educación primaria en la República Argentina: sus causas, sus remedios. M. Biedma, 1882.
- Memoria histórica y descriptiva de la Provincia de Tucumán. M. Biedma, 1882.
- Fruto Vedado. Costumbres Argentinas. M. Biedma, 1884.
- A Buenos Ayres. Poésie dite par Coquelin au Politeama Argentino à l’occasion de sa dernière représentation, au bénéfice de la societé Damas de Misericordia, le 27 août 1888. Editor Félix Lojouane, 1888.
- Del Plata al Niágara. Pablo E. Coni é Hijos, 1897.
- Une enigme litteraire le Don Quichotte d Avellaneda. Alphonse Picard et fils, 1903.
- El viaje intelectual. Impresiones de naturaleza y arte. Primera serie. Librería General de Victoriano Suárez, 1904.
- La República Argentina en el centenario de su independencia. 1907.
- Santiago de Liniers. Conde de Buenos Aires 1753-1810. Arnoldo Moen y Hermano, 1907.
- Roque Sáenz Peña: candidato para presidente de la República. Imprenta de Coni Hermanos, 1909.
- Les Iles Malouines: nouvel exposé d’un vieux litige. Coni, 1910.
- M. Clemenceau et la République Argentine. Librairie H. Champion, 1911.
- Toponymie historique: des cotes de La Patagonie. Coni, 1913.
- Mendoza y Garay: las dos fundaciones de Buenos Aires. Jesús Menéndez, 1916.
- Estudios de historia Argentina. Jesús Menéndez, Librero Editor, 1918.
- Los que pasaban. Jesús Menéndez, 1919.

== Bibliography ==
- Bruno, Paula, Paul Groussac. Un estratega intelectual, Buenos Aires, Fondo de Cultura Económica, 2005.
- Bruno, Paula (Estudio preliminar y selección de textos), Travesías intelectuales de Paul Groussac, Buenos Aires, Editorial de la Universidad Nacional de Quilmes, 2005.
- Bruno, Paula, Pioneros culturales de la Argentina. Biografías de una época, 1860-1910, Buenos Aires, Siglo XXI Editores, 2011.
