= Riglos =

Riglos may refer to:

== People ==
- Ana Estefanía Dominga Riglos (1788–1869), Argentine patriot, wife of Matías de Irigoyen
- Master of Riglos (died circa 1460), Spanish Gothic painter
- Mercedes de Lasala de Riglos (1764 –1837), Argentine patriot and socialite
- Miguel de Riglos Bástida (1649–1719), Spanish nobleman, merchant, and Captain in the fort of Buenos Aires

== Places ==
- Las Peñas de Riglos, municipality in the province of Huesca, Spain
- Miguel Riglos, town in La Pampa Province in Argentina

== Other ==
- Bodega Riglos, Argentine producer of premium wines
- Mallos de Riglos, a set of conglomerate rock formations in the municipality of Las Peñas de Riglos
