= Enas =

Enas or ENAS may refer to:

- Enas & enas, a 2000 Greek language film
- Ny-Ålesund Airport, Hamnerabben, Svalbard, Norway
- Enas Al-Ghoul, Palestinian agricultural engineer

== See also ==
- Ena (disambiguation)
