= Ena (name) =

Name list

Ena is a given name, nickname, and surname. Notable people and characters with the name include:

== Given name or nickname ==
- Ena von Baer (born 1974), Chilean journalist, political scientist and senator
- Ena Baga (1906–2004), British pianist and theatre organist
- Ena Begović (1960–2000), Croatian actress
- Ena Bertoldi (1878–1906), English contortionist
- Ena Sandra Causevic (born 1989), Danish model
- Ena Chadha, Indo-Canadian human rights lawyer
- Ena Collymore-Woodstock (1917–2025), Jamaican barrister and magistrate
- Ena Cremona (1936–2024), Maltese judge at the European Union General Court
- Ena de Silva (1922–2015), Sri Lankan artist
- Ena Fitzgerald (1889–1962), English novelist and poet
- Ena Fujita (born 1990), Japanese musician and model
- Ena Gregory (1906–1993), Australian motion picture actress
- Ena Guevara (born 1959), Peruvian long-distance runner
- Ena Hartman (1932–2025), American actress
- Ena Harwood (1913–1993), Australian television and radio personality
- Ena Kadic (1989–2015), Bosnian-Austrian model and beauty pageant titleholder
- Ena Mori, Filipino-Japanese singer-songwriter and musician
- Ena Murray (1936–2015), Afrikaans writer
- Ena Noël (1910–2003), Australian dancer, teacher, librarian and advocate for children's literature
- Ena Lamont Stewart (1912–2006), Scottish playwright
- Ena Lucía Portela (born 1972), Cuban writer
- Ena May Neill (1910–1997), British head teacher
- Ena Rottenberg (1893–1952), Hungarian-Austrian craftswoman
- Ena Saha (born 1991), Indian actress
- Ena Sendijarević (born 1987), Bosnian-Dutch filmmaker and screenwriter
- Ena Shibahara (born 1998), American tennis player
- Ena Stockley (1906–1989), New Zealand swimmer
- Ena Swansea (born 1966), American artist
- Ena Suzuki (born 2004), Japanese idol
- Ena Thomas (1935–2020), Welsh television chef
- Ena Twigg (1847–1920), British psychic medium
- Ena Vazquez-Nuttall (1937–2011), Puerto Rican psychologist
- Paul Kostabi (born 1962), American artist, musician, and producer
- Victoria Eugenie of Battenberg (1887–1969), Queen of Spain

== Surname ==
- John Kauluhinano Ena (1845–1906), Chinese-Hawaiian political advisor
- Justin Ena (born 1977), American football player
- Rav Ena (died 540), Jewish Savora sage

== Fictional characters ==
- Ena Sharples, from the British soap opera Coronation Street
- Ena Saitō, a character from the manga series Laid-Back Camp
- Ena Shinonome, from the Japanese video game Hatsune Miku: Colorful Stage!
- Aunt Ena, from the book Bambi, a Life in the Woods
- Ena, Aeon of Order from Honkai: Star Rail
- ENA, from the video game ENA: Dream BBQ, and from the YouTube Series, ENA, by Joel G.
- Ena Ayase, from the manga series Yotsuba&!
