= Mercedes de Lasala de Riglos =

Argentine patriot and socialite (1764–1837)

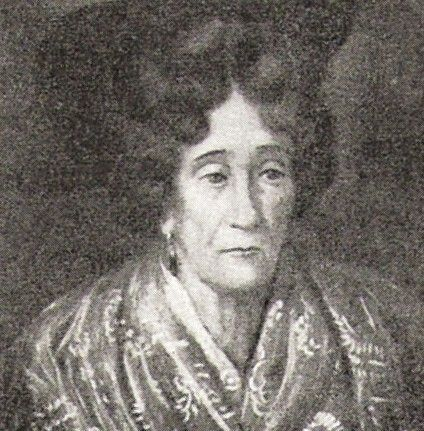
- Mercedes Lasala de Riglos c. 1830
- Born: María Josefa de las Mercedes Lasala Fernández de Larrazábal; 23 September 1764; Buenos Aires, Argentina
- Died: 1 January 1837 (aged 72); Buenos Aires, Argentina
- Occupations: Socialite, Philanthropist

Mercedes de Lasala de Riglos or (incorrectly) Ana Lasala de Riglos (Note: William Parish Robertson, brother of John Parish Robertson, wrote in 1843 of the time he spent in Buenos Aires in 1817. He called Madama Riglos "Doña Ana Riglos". José Antonio Wilde and Octavio C. Battolla, writing in 1908, both clearly draw on Robertson's account and call her "Ana Riglos". María Saénz Quesada, writing in La Nación in 1998, says Ana Lasala de Riglos owned a luxurious house in front of the Plaza de la Victoria. The house was actually owned by 'Mercedes de Lasala's son, Miguel de Riglos y Lasala.) (23 September 1764 – 1 January 1837), known as Madame Riglos, was an Argentine patriot and socialite during the period when Argentina was gaining its independence from Spain. Her home was a meeting place where information could be exchanged and the issues of the day discussed. In 1823 she was one of the founders of the famous philanthropic society Sociedad de Beneficencia de Buenos Aires and served as its first president.

== Family ==
María Josefa de las Mercedes Lasala Fernández Larrazabal was born in Buenos Aires on 23 September 1764 and baptised two days later. She was from an old patrician family. Her father was Jean Baptiste de La Salle Bachaulet (8 February 1729 – c. 1780), originally from Monein, Bearn, France. Her mother was Juana Agustina Fernandez de la Cruz Larrazabal, born on 5 May 1741 in Buenos Aires. Mercedes was the second oldest of a family of at least 10 children. Her youngest sister was Maria Eusebia Rafaela Jossefa (1774–1854).

On 13 April 1782 Mercedes de Lasala married Miguel Fermín Mariano Riglos San Martín (12 October 1754 – 16 May 1808) in Buenos Aires. He was a captain of dragoons in the Fixed Regiment. Their children were Miguel Francisco Xavier Julián Buenaventura (17 February 1783), Josefa Rosa Mercedes Dionisia (2 March 1784 – 5 Jan 1873), Miguel José Sabelio (9 January 1790 – 20 Nov 1863), José Ramón Francisco (1 April 1791), Martín Marcos José (12 November 1793), Ramón Doroteo Ignacio (6 February 1795), José Martín Ramón Buenaventura (30 January 1797 – 22 February 1839) and Francisca Javiera (died 28 July 1862). Her husband died in 1809.

== Support for independence movement ==
Mercedes was known among the ladies of Buenos Aires for her determined patriotism. She belonged to the Patricias Argentinas, a group of female financiers who contributed in financing the Argentine War of Independence in 1812. Her sister, Eusebia de Lasala, was part of the commission that interviewed Cornelio Saavedra and convinced him to participate in the freedom movement. In 1810 Mercedes contributed three ounces of gold to support the First Upper Peru campaign. Eusebia contributed one ounce of gold.

== Tertulias ==
Mercedes de Riglos was among the well-to-do women of Buenos Aires who held weekly social gatherings that were open to anyone introduced by a friend. Similar tertulias were being held during this period in Lima, Peru, by women such as Manuela Rábago de Avellafuertes de Riglos and Narcisa Arias de Saavaedra. It was at meetings at her house and those of other society women such as Mariquita Sánchez de Thompson and Flora Azcuénaga that the discussions were held which led up to the May Revolution, the first stage in the struggle for Argentine independence from Spain. William Parish Robertson, an English merchant, visited Buenos Aires around the end of 1817. He wrote much later,

There were, among my more intimate acquaintances, three remarkable ladies; and as I think they belong to the domestic history of Buenos Ayres, I must not pass them over in silence. They were Doña Ana [sic] Riglos, Doña Melchora Sarratea, and Doña Mariquita Thompson. They were the heads of three distinct parties, which I can scarcely call political, but which I may designate as public. One heard all the news at their morning levees : learned all the movements of the great men of the state, in power and out of power: the best of these men you met at their houses. Public events were discussed good humouredly, almost philosophically; and as the three ladies in question were all favourable to European alliances, their houses were the constant resort of both English and French naval commanders, consuls-general and other foreign envoys and diplomatists. There they got much better acquainted with all the on dits of the day than at the government palace; and there they indirectly promulgated their own opinions and views, in the certainty that they would reach the proper quarter. Doña Ana Riglos, a widow, was a nice and intelligent old lady; vivacious, well bred, with a tinge of aristocratic etiquette of the old school, she was yet at home with every body, and her parties were of the pleasantest I knew. Her son, Don Miguel, was educated in England, and returned to Buenos Ayres in the same convoy with myself, in 1813. He was then a handsome, fair young man of twenty-one, spoke English remarkably well, dressed á la Bond-street, and was one of not very many who really profited by an English education. A mighty favourite (and deservedly so) he was of his mother and sister, and still more of his aunt, Doña Eusebia de la Sala (Note: Eusebia de Lasala (16 December 1774 - 10 July 1854) was a Buenos Aires patrician. She was the sister of Mercedes de Lasala.)—perhaps the best natured, kindest, and frankest woman in Buenos Ayres.

"Madame Riglos" could be seen as the chief lady of the conservative faction in Buenos Aires. She was familiar, but also aristocratic. Her house was the meeting place of government figures. She was popular with English naval officers because of her patience in correcting their linguistic errors and her willingness to defend them against criticism for their performance in the local dances. Doña Melchora de Sarratea, a lady of fashion and of the Buenos Aires salons, was so aware of public and private affairs that she was held to be an enthusiastic supporter of Whig (liberal) principles. Mariquita Sánchez de Thompson's focus was foreign relations. She was wealhty and collected outstanding personalities and also luxury products of European art and industry such as porcelains, engravings and clocks.

== Charity ==
Mercedes Lasala was one of the founders of the Sociedad de Beneficencia (Charity Society) created by Bernardino Rivadavia in 1823. She was the first president of the society, holding office until January 1827. The society ran public institutions to help women and children, and played an important role in female education. She worked to promote the society until her death. Mercedes de Lasala de Riglos died in Buenos Aires on 1 January 1837.

== Balcón de Riglos ==
Mercedes Lasala de Riglos's son, Miguel de Riglos y Lasala, was educated in London and returned to Buenos Aires in February 1813 at the age of 21. Don Miguel de Riglos y Lasala was known as the "English Lord". On 11 February 1825 Colonel Manuel de Escalada sold a house on the Plaza de la Victoria to Miguel de Riglos y Lasala as agent of his brother-in-law José de San Martín, who was absent in Europe. The house had been given to San Martín by the state on 16 August 1819, and was sold for $20,000 cash. It was a few meters from the Buenos Aires Cabildo. It came to be known as the "Balcón de Riglos". Others called it called "Los Altos". Miguel and his wife Doña Dolores Villanueva furnished the house with all the luxury and comfort of the time. For more than 30 years the long and narrow balcony of the house was the place from which the best society viewed every parade or procession.

== Sources ==
- Battolla, Octavio C. (1908), La sociedad de antaño (in Spanish), Moloney & De Martino
- Cutolo, Vicente Osvaldo (1968), Nuevo diccionario biográfico argentino (1750–1930), Editorial Elche
- Davies, Catherine; Brewster, Claire; Owen, Hilary (2006), South American Independence: Gender, Politics, Text, Liverpool University Press, ISBN 978-1-84631-027-0
- Delgado Jordan, Guillermo Carlos, "Maria Josepha de las Mercedes de la Sala Fernandes Larrazabal", Geneanet (in Spanish)
- "Ellas también hicieron el 25 de Mayo", Cartelera de Historia (in Spanish), 26 May 2008
- Galasso, Norberto (1994), La Revolución de Mayo: el pueblo quiere saber de qué se trató (in Spanish), Ediciones Colihue SRL, ISBN 978-950-581-798-6
- García López, Ana Belén (2016-11-07), Las heroínas silenciadas en las independencias hispanoamericanas (in Spanish), Megustaescribirlibros, ISBN 978-84-9112-679-9
- Labougle, Horacio, "San Martín En El Ostracismo: Sus Recursos" (PDF), José de San Martín – El Libertador (in Spanish), Instituto Sanmartiniano
- López, Ana Belén García (2016-11-07), Las heroínas silenciadas en las independencias hispanoamericanas (in Spanish), Megustaescribirlibros, ISBN 978-84-9112-679-9
- "María Josefa de las Mercedes Lasala Fernández Larrazabal", Family Genealogy
- Robertson, I.P.; Robertson, W.P. (1843), Letters (to General Wm. Miller) on South America: Comprising Travels on the Banks of the Paraná and Rio de la Plata, J. Murray
- Saénz Quesada, María (23 September 1998), "El arma de las mujeres", La Nación (in Spanish), Buenos Aires
- Wilde, José Antonio (1908), "XVI", Buenos Aires desde setenta años atrás (in Spanish)
