= Juan Pedro Esnaola =

Argentine composer

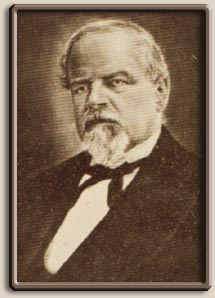

Juan Pedro Esnaola (17 August 1808, in Buenos Aires – 8 July 1878, in Buenos Aires) was an Argentine composer from the first half of the nineteenth century. He is remembered as the arranger of the Argentine National Anthem.

== Biography ==
Esnaola was born in Buenos Aires to a Spanish-Basque father and a local-born mother of Basque background. He began musical training as a child, under his uncle, the priest José Antonio Picasarri (1769–1843), chapel master at the cathedral of Buenos Aires. As the region became independent from Spain in 1810, and Picasarri decided not to resign his Spanish citizenship, he was forced to leave the country (1818). He took along his nephew, who then was able to take piano and counterpoint lessons from European music teachers in Madrid and Paris (and perhaps also other cities). Esnaola wrote an unspecified number of piano pieces in Madrid (now lost).

Picasarri and Esnaola could return to Buenos Aires on 29 June 1822 thanks to an amnesty law that Governor Martín Rodríguez issued on that year. They soon founded a "School of Music and Singing" supported by the provincial government, and participated in the performances of the local Philharmonic Society. Esnaola must have completed his training as a composer with the Spanish violinist, singer, composer, and impresario Mariano Pablo Rosquellas in Buenos Aires over the following years, and, at 16, wrote a three-voice Mass in D major (1824) that summarized his knowledge of the art.

Starting around 1827, Esnaola began a career as a merchant and businessman, following in the footsteps of his father. During the 1830s and later, he developed an active social life. Even though he avoided party affiliations, the regime of Governor Juan Manuel de Rosas blacklisted and imprisoned him for a few weeks in 1840. He managed to weather the storm probably by composing anthems in praise of Rosas (1841-1843); yet there is no evidence that Esnaola ever belonged to the latter's party, nor he served any significant administrative positions. Esnaola did attend regularly the salon of Rosas's daughter, Manuelita, in Palermo, to whom he dedicated a string of songs and dances, and who may have interceded for his release.

After Rosas was overthrown and went into exile with his family (1852), Esnaola occupied several official positions, including the administration of the Serenos (night watchmen), the direction of the provincial mint, the presidency of the bourgeois Club del Progreso (1858), and that of the Bank of the Province of Buenos Aires (1866). During these years, Esnaola seldom appeared in public as a performer, yet he contributed administrative and overseeing work to concert societies and conservatories. He participated in the resurrection of the Philharmonic Society, for which he performed the piano again in 1855, and, later, held honorary posts in the La Lira music society and the Society of the Quartet. Esnaola furthermore presided over the supervising committee for the School of Music of the [Buenos Aires] Province, founded in 1874. In the meanwhile, he continued to amass a fortune both considerable and controversial, through mortgage loans and property rental. He died a single man, and bequeathed his millions to his sister's family.

== Pianist ==
Esnaola was universally recognized as an excellent piano performer. While a teenager, he often participated in concerts organized by the School of Music or the Philharmonic Society, in which he also sang opera excerpts. Yet he refused to carry on a professional career, and from the 1830s, he mainly appeared in private venues.

== Works ==
Esnaola cultivated most of the living genres in the Buenos Aires of his days, in a personal style based upon Mozart, Haydn, and Rossini, but that gradually incorporated Romantic influences. Even though he frowned away from folk songs and dances, his production is by no means a mere imitation of international trends, and carries a seal of its own. There is no evidence that he ever accepted a paid commission. He seems to have created music for free, as contributions to certain institutions or as gifts for friends and family members.

In the mid-to-late 1820s and early 1830s, Esnaola regularly wrote church music, including his Mass in D, two more Masses (now lost), a Mass and Office for the dead, several hymns and motets, and a large-scale Miserere for voice and piano (1833), which earned him a well-deserved fame. His catalog also includes three lost symphonies. He re-orchestrated for local performance several large-scale compositions that were available only in piano-vocal scores, including Rossini's opera Otello (1827) and Haydn's oratorio The Creation (1845).

Starting in 1833, Esnaola created salon songs and dances with increasing frequency. Around 1835–1836, he developed a self-conscious project for the creation of "national" song together with the poet and ideologue, Esteban Echeverría. If the collection never saw the public light, the experience had a noticeable impact upon Esnaola's subsequent productions in the genre. His later songs grew in length and artistic elaboration. By 1841, he had collected 48 of his songs in an unpublished autograph collection; about ten more survive in the music notebooks that belonged to Manuelita Rosas. His choice of poets includes Vicente López y Planes, Juan Cruz Varela, Luis Méndez, and the female poet and feminist Rosa Guerra. Piano dances that often assume the intimate and elaborate qualities of instrumental miniatures were the main object of his attention during the 1840s, including minuets, waltzes, and polkas.

Esnaola regularly produced anthems for civil institution, including the School of Moral Sciences, the Society of Beneficence (both dated in 1827), and the Philharmonic Society (1856). Probably to placate Rosas's anger, he wrote four hymns in his praise (1841-1843), plus two festive songs in honor of Manuelita Rosas (1851).

In spite of Esnaola's notable accomplishments as a pianist and composer, his name is more often remembered as the arranger of the Argentine National Anthem, composed by the Catalan Blas Parera in 1813. Esnaola first produced an unofficial two-voice arrangement around 1848. In 1860, he was commissioned a new version, which met with general approval in spite of the many novelties it incorporated. This arrangement, with a few modifications, was declared as the official anthem of the Argentine Republic and is still in use today.

== Works, editions and recordings ==
Juan Pedro Esnaola, Cuaderno de música (1844). Facsimile edition with a preliminary study by Bernardo Illari. La Plata, Argentina: Instituto Cultural de la Provincia de Buenos Aires, 2009.

Alcorta-Esnaola-Alberdi-Gianneo-Turina-Gomes-De Falla-Gilardi-Bragato, Camerata Bariloche, dirigida por Elias Khayat, Profonar SRL/Star Music - CB101 - (1995) CD

Selected songs in 2 volumes:

- Vol.1 River Plate Musical Romanticism. Songs by J.P. Esnaola based on poems by Esteban Echeverría. E. Jáuregui (soprano) N. Broggini (Traumann fortepiano, originally owned by Esnaola). Tradition, Buenos Aires, TR050412.
- Vol.2 Canciones 1833-1836; Elena López Jáuregui, soprano & Norberto Broggini, fortepiano NB009 2007
