= Rasal =

Rasal may refer to:

- Rasal, Spain, a village in Aragon
- Rasal (record label), a Welsh label
