= Isabel Calvimontes =

Argentine patriot and socialite (1790–1855)

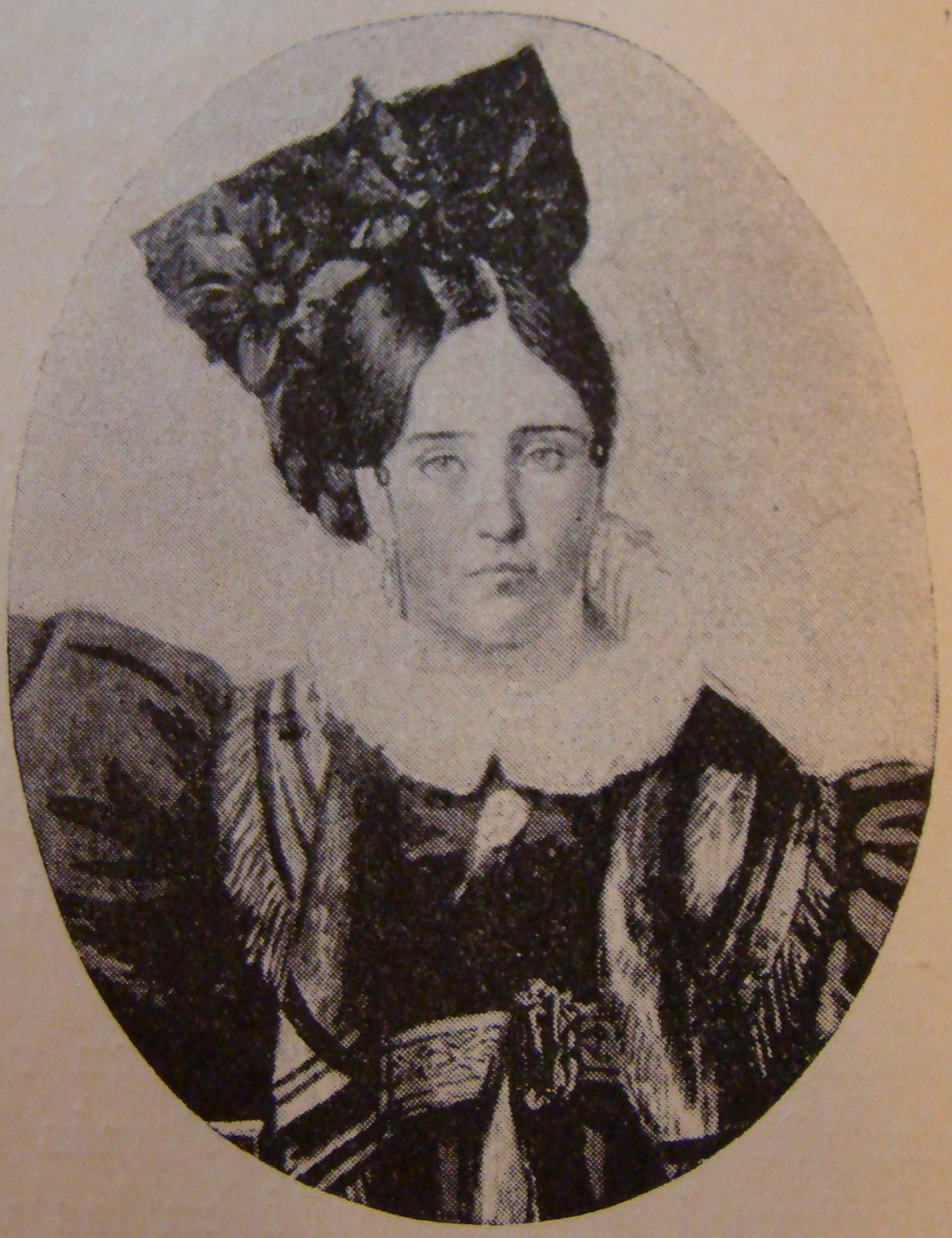
Isabel Calvimontes

Isabel Calvimontes (November 19, 1790 – December 20, 1855) was an Upper Peru-born Argentine patriot who participated in Buenos Aires society at the service of the May Revolution and in the early years of the emancipatory movement. She is one of the Patricias Argentinas.

== Early life and marriage ==
Isabel Calvimontes Trujillo was born on November 19, 1790, in Chuquisaca, Upper Peru. (Note: At the time, it was part of the Spanish Empire; later, it became part of Bolivia.) She was the daughter of José Calvimontes, prosecutor of the court of the Real Audiencia of Charcas and Florencia Trujillo.

On August 14, 1804, (Note: According to Carranza, the marriage took place in 1803.) in Chuquisaca, she married Dr. Pedro José Agrelo, who had befriended her father at the University of Saint Francis Xavier. (Note: José Calvimontes had a decisive influence on Agrelo's decision to change his studies as a seminarian to law studies.) She had several children, among them José Pedro Agrelo Calvimontes and the future colonel, Martín Avelino Agrelo Calvimontes.

The failure of the Chuquisaca Revolution in 1809 forced Pedro José Agrelo to abandon his post as subdelegate in Tupiza and move with his wife to his hometown, the City of Buenos Aires. There, he did not take long to integrate into the circles that promoted American independence and when the May Revolution of 1810 took place, the couple immediately joined the patriot movement.

== 1811–12 ==
In June 1811, Diego Saavedra, son of Cornelio Saavedra, the president of the Junta Grande, and Juan Pedro Aguirre left for the United States as commissioners with the mission of acquiring weapons and ammunition in that country.

At the beginning of 1812, the commissioners concluded a contract for the purchase of 1,000 rifles and 350,000 bullets with the firm Miller & Wambor. (Note: A major deal with a Philadelphia merchant, Stephen Gerard, was already authorized, but lack of funds forced Miller & Wambor to close. Aguirre had 11,690 pesos provided by the government and put in 3,310 more from his own account.) On May 13, the commissioners and supplies arrived at the Barragán cove port aboard the US-flagged vessel Liberty and on May 19, they anchored off the port of Buenos Aires. Word spread of the ship's arrival at the port of Buenos Aires and that the economic situation of the revolutionary government made its purchase difficult. (Note: The situation of the treasury was critical. For that month of May 1812, expenses had amounted to 243,825 pesos, of which 110,614, more than 45%, corresponded to war expenses and 68,020 pesos, almost 28%, to cancellation of debt taken for similar concepts.)

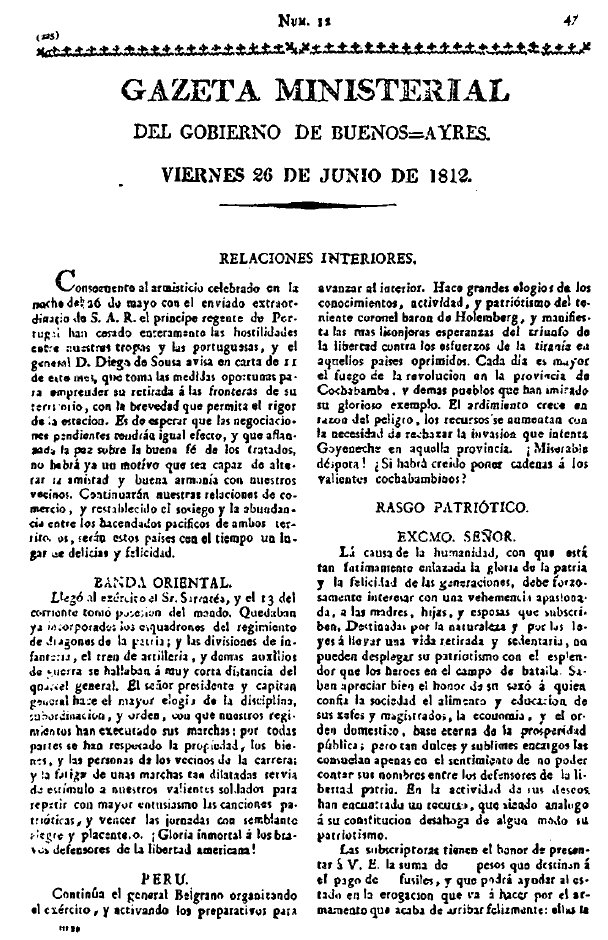
Publication regarding the subscription in the Gazeta de Buenos-Ayres

On May 30, 1812, fourteen society women of Buenos Aires met at the home of Tomasa de la Quintana, the wife of Antonio José de Escalada. The patrician women, who would become known as the "Sociedad Patriótica" (Patriotic Society) made donations equivalent to thirteen rifles and two ounces of gold so that, according to Bernardo de Monteagudo, they could say, "I armed this brave man who assured our freedom". The patricians requested that each of the rifles acquired with their contributions would bear the name of the donor. In addition to Calvimontes, the women who subscribed by donating a rifle were, Tomasa de la Quintana, María de los Remedios de Escalada, María de las Nieves de Escalada, María de la Quintana, María Eugenia de Escalada de Demaría, Ramona Esquivel y Aldao, Mariquita Sánchez, Petrona Bernardina Cordero, Rufina de Orma, María de la Encarnación Andonaégui de Valdepares, Magdalena de Castro de Herrero y Ángela Castelli de Irgazábal, while the two ounces of gold was donated by Carmen de la Quintanilla de Alvear. On June 26, the First Triumvirate accepted the patrician donation, rendering "the most expressive thanks in the name of the country", in the Gazeta de Buenos-Ayres.

== Exile and death ==
Her husband's political life led him into exile in the United States (1817), imprisonment on the Martín García Island, and again in exile in Montevideo, where he was killed on July 23, 1846. Sometimes, Calvimontes accompanied her husband, while at other times, they were separated. While in exile, she sometimes lived in a high social position, and in other times, in misery. She took care of the family and faced setbacks with resignation.

Calvimontes died in Buenos Aires on December 20, 1855.

== See also ==
- Argentine War of Independence

== Bibliography ==
- Carranza, Adolfo Pedro (1910). Patricias Argentinas. Buenos Aires: Sociedad Patricias Argentinas. (in Spanish)
- Cutolo, Vicente Osvaldo (1968). Nuevo diccionario biográfico argentino (1750-1930). Buenos Aires: Editorial Elche. (in Spanish)
- Sosa de Newton, Lily (1972). Diccionario biográfico de mujeres argentinas. Buenos Aires. (in Spanish)
- Yaben, Jacinto R. (1952). Biografías argentinas y sudamericanas. Buenos Aires: Ediciones Históricas Argentinas. (in Spanish)
