= Ena =

Ena or ENA may refer to:

== Education ==
- École nationale d'administration, French Grande école, for civil service
- Education Networks of America, Internet service provider

== Government and politics ==
- English National Association, a former political party
- Ensame Nacionalista Astur, a defunct political party in Spain
- Ethiopian News Agency, of the Government of Ethiopia
- Étoile Nord-Africaine (The North African Star), a former Algerian nationalist organization

== Places ==
- Ena District, Gifu (ceased 2005), a former district in Japan
- Ena, Gifu (formed 2004), a city in Japan
- Ena, Gujarat, a village in India
- Ena, Pañas de Riglos, Aragon, Spain
- Ena Lake, Ontario, Canada
- Ena Lake (Saskatchewan), Canada
- Mount Ena, in Japan

== Science and technology ==
- Ena (gastropod), a genus of land snails
- Extractable nuclear antigen
- Energetic neutral atom
- European Nucleotide Archive

== Transportation ==
- Ena Railway, in Japan; defunct
- Ena Station, a railway station in Ena, Japan
- Kenai Municipal Airport in Alaska, United States
- SB Ena, a 1906 wooden Thames sailing barge
- ST Ena, a Greek tugboat
- SY Ena, an Australian steam yacht

== Other uses ==
- Ena (album), a 2006 album by Greek artist Peggy Zina
- ENA Channel, a Greek television channel
- ENA: Dream BBQ, 2025 video game
- Ena (name), list of people with the name
- ENA (South Korean TV channel), a South Korean commercial general entertainment channel
  - KT ENA, the owner and operator of the aforementioned TV channel
- Apali language
- Emergency Nurses Association
- Energy Networks Australia, a trade association
- Energy Networks Association (United Kingdom), a trade association
- European NAvigator, an educational website
- Experimental Negotiation Agreement (1974–1984), a United Steelworkers agreement with U.S. Steel and other steelmakers
