= Yeste =

Yeste may refer to:

- Francisco Yeste, Spanish football midfielder
- Yeste, Albacete, Spanish municipality
- Yeste, Huesca, Spanish village
