= Vicente López y Planes =

President of Argentina in 1827

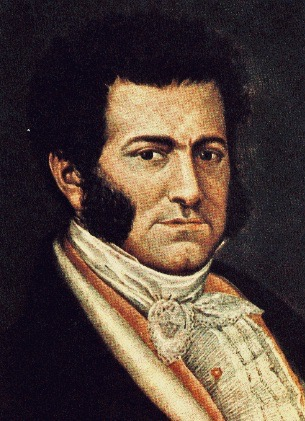

2nd President of Argentina
- In office 7 July 1827 – 17 August 1827
- Preceded by: Bernardino Rivadavia
- Succeeded by: Manuel Dorrego

Governor of Buenos Aires Province
- In office 13 February 1852 – 26 July 1852
- Preceded by: Juan Manuel de Rosas
- Succeeded by: Justo José de Urquiza

Personal details
- Born: May 3, 1785 Buenos Aires, Viceroyalty of the Río de la Plata
- Died: October 10, 1856 (aged 71) Buenos Aires, Argentina
- Party: Independent
- Other political affiliations: Conciliador
- Spouse: Lucía Petrona Riera Merlo
- Education: University of Chuquisaca
- Profession: Lawyer

Vicente López y Planes (May 3, 1785 – October 10, 1856) was an Argentine writer and politician who acted as interim President of Argentina from July 7 to August 18, 1827. He also wrote the lyrics of the Argentine National Anthem adopted on May 11, 1813.

== Early life ==
Baptized Alejandro Vicente, he never used his first name. López began his primary studies in the San Francisco School, and later studied in the Real Colegio San Carlos, today the Colegio Nacional de Buenos Aires. He obtained a doctorate of laws in the University of Chuquisaca. He served as a captain in the Patriotic Regiment during the English invasions. After the Argentine victory he composed a poem entitled El triunfo argentino (The Argentine Triumph).

== Political life ==
He participated in the Cabildo Abierto of May 22, 1810, and supported the formation of the Primera Junta. He had good relations with Manuel Belgrano. When the royalist members of the city government of Buenos Aires were expelled, he was elected mayor of the city; he was an enemy of the party of Cornelio Saavedra and one of the creators of the First Triumvirate, of which he was the Treasurer.

Like many other nineteenth century Argentines prominent in public life, he was a freemason.

López was a member of the Constituent Assembly of year XIII, representing Buenos Aires. At the request of the Assembly, he wrote the lyrics to a "patriotic march", which eventually became the Argentine National Anthem. It was a military march, whose music was composed by the Catalan Blas Parera; it was approved on March 11, 1813. The first public reading was at a tertulia on May 7 in the house of Mariquita Sánchez de Thompson. It displaced a different march, written by Esteban de Luca, which would have been the anthem if not for the more militaristic Lopez.

López participated in the government of Carlos María de Alvear, and with his fall he was sent to prison. He held a few more public offices, and was then named Secretary of the Constituent Congress of 1825, and, a little later, minister for the president Bernardino Rivadavia.

After the scandal of negotiations with the Brazilian Empire, Rivadavia resigned the presidency. In his place, López was elected as caretaker, signing the dissolution of the Congress and calling elections in Buenos Aires. The new governor, Manuel Dorrego took charge of the ministry; this unified the federalists. When Dorrego fell from grace and was executed by firing squad by Juan Lavalle, Lopez was exiled to Uruguay.

== Late years ==
He returned in 1830 as a member of the Tribunal of Justice for Juan Manuel de Rosas. He was president of the Tribunal for many years and, among other things, presided over the judgement of the assassins of Juan Facundo Quiroga.

He was president of the literary salon led by Marcos Sastre, but was not part of the group known as the Generation of '37, to which belonged his two sons, Vicente Fidel López and Lucio Vicente López.

== See also ==
- List of heads of state of Argentina

Political offices
Preceded by Bernardino Rivadavia	President of Argentina; 1827	Succeeded by Manuel Dorrego
Preceded by Juan Manuel de Rosas	Governor of Buenos Aires Province; 1852	Succeeded by Justo José de Urquiza
