= Energy Networks Association =

Energy Networks Association may refer to:

- Energy Networks Australia, formerly Energy Networks Association, the national body in Australia for companies that maintain energy networks
- Energy Networks Association (United Kingdom), the trade association in the United Kingdom for companies that maintain electricity transmission and distribution networks
