= Kagaari South =

Electoral ward in Embu County, Kenya

Coordinates: 0°29′29″S 37°36′37″E

- Ward
- A view of Kaguma, Gichera

- Location in Embu County
- Country: Kenya
- County: Embu
- Capital: Ugweri

Government
  - Member Of County Assembly: Susan Wariru

Area
  - Total: 78.23 km^{2} (30.20 sq mi)

Population
  - Total: 25,397
  - Density: 324.6/km^{2} (840.8/sq mi)

Kagaari South is an electoral ward in Embu County, Kenya, located within Runyenjes Constituency. It borders Kyeni South to the northeast, Evurore to the east, Nthawa to the south, Kithimu and Gaturi South to the west, and Central Ward to the northwest. As of 2026, it has a projected population of 27,867 across an area of approximately 78.2 km² and making it the 11th most populous ward in embu county. Its main commercial centres include Ena, Ugweri and Karurumo.

== Demographics ==
Historical population
Year	Pop.	±%
2009	20,426	—
2019	25,397	+24.3%
2022	26,782	+5.5%
2024	27,336	+2.1%
2025	27,613	+1.0%

As of 2026, Kagaari South Ward has an estimated population of 27,867 representing an increase of approximately 2,470 people from the 2019 census population of 25,397. The ward covers an area of approximately 78.2 km² with a population density of 356 people per km². In 2019, it had approximately 7,702 households, with an average household size of 3.3 persons, comparable to the Embu County average of 3.3 persons per household. The ward is predominantly rural, with its main urban and market centres including Ena, Ugweri and Karurumo which serve as important centres of commerce and local services.

Population (2019)
#	Area	Total population	Male	Female	Area (km²)	Density (people/km²)
Kagaari S. East		11,498	5,845	5,653	39.9	288
1	Gichera	6,379	3,213	3,166	14.7	433
2	Kiringa	5,119	2,632	2,487	25.2	203
Kagaari S. West		13,899	7,025	6,874	38.3	363
3	Kawanjara	4,687	2,317	2,370	7.6	618
4	Maranga	2,385	1,245	1,140	12.3	193
5	Nthagaiya	6,827	3,463	3,364	18.4	371
