= Triste, Pañas de Riglos =

Triste
- Locality
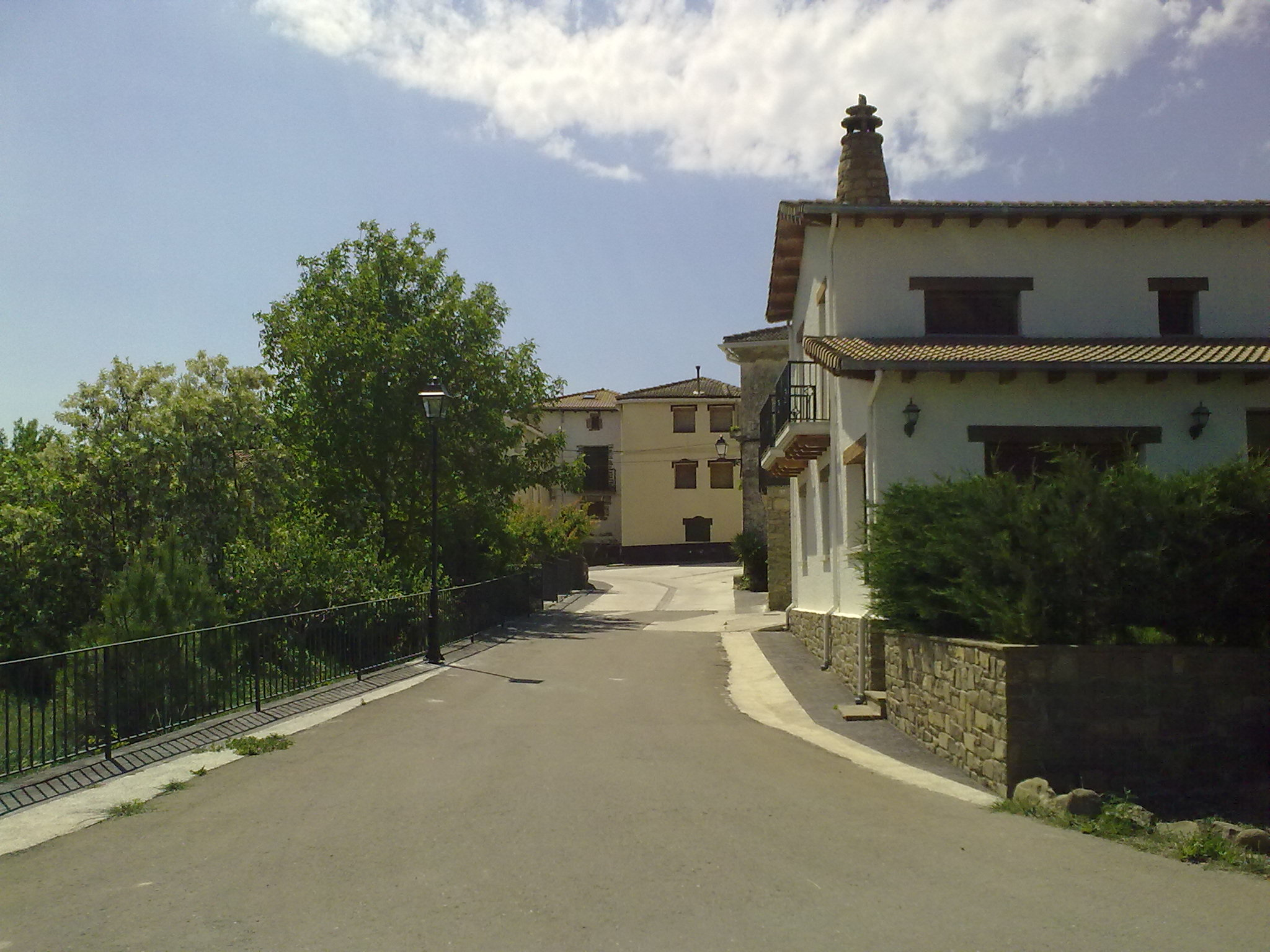

- Location within Aragon Location within Spain
- Coordinates: 42°23′12″N 0°43′5″W
- Country: Spain
- Autonomous community: Aragon
- Province: Province of Huesca
- Municipality: Las Peñas de Riglos
- Elevation: 562 m (1,844 ft)

Population
  - Total: 18

Triste is a locality located in the municipality of Las Peñas de Riglos, in Huesca province, Aragon, Spain. As of 2020, it has a population of 18.

== Geography ==
Triste is located 50km northwest of Huesca.
