= Carcavilla =

- Locality
- Location within Aragon Location within Spain
- Coordinates: 42°22′19″N 0°44′16″W
- Country: Spain
- Autonomous community: Aragon
- Province: Province of Huesca
- Municipality: Las Peñas de Riglos
- Elevation: 524 m (1,719 ft)

Population
  - Total: 0

Carcavilla is a locality located in the municipality of Las Peñas de Riglos, in Huesca province, Aragon, Spain. As of 2020, it has a population of 0.

== Geography ==
Carcavilla is located 44km northwest of Huesca.
