= Argentine National Anthem =

Himno Nacional Argentino
English: Argentine National Anthem
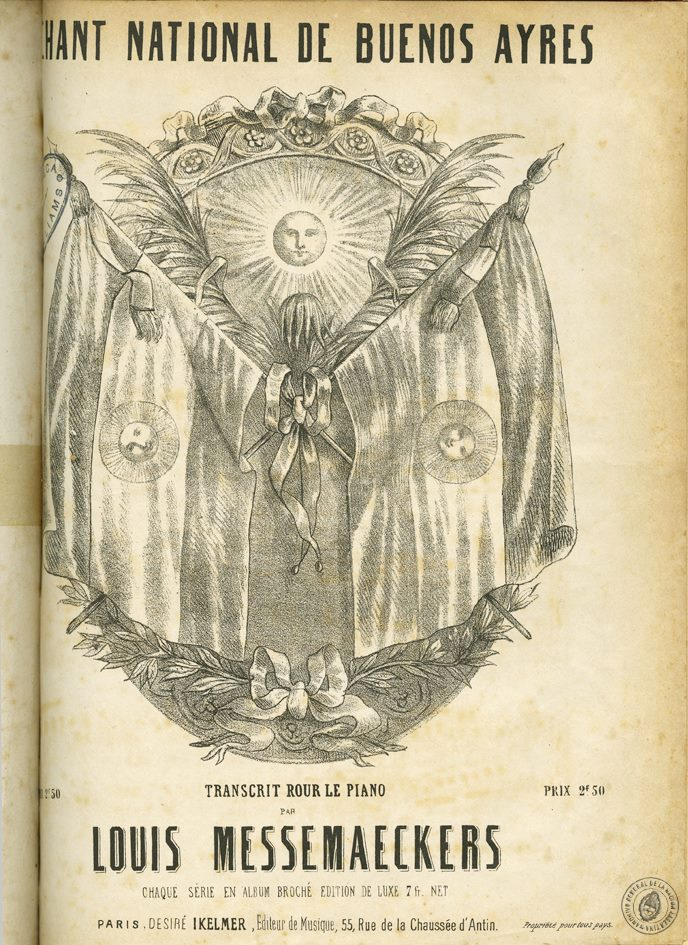
- French transcription for piano by Louis Messemaeckers, published around 1855. This is the oldest sheet music found of the Argentine national anthem outside of Argentina.
- National anthem of Argentina
- Also known as: "Marcha Patriótica" (English: Patriotic March)
- Lyrics: Vicente López y Planes, 1813
- Music: Blas Parera, 1813
- Adopted: May 11, 1813; 213 years ago

Audio sample
- U.S. Navy Band instrumental version: file; help

Official band and vocal recording
Performed by the National Polyphonic Choir and Military Band

The Argentine National Anthem (Spanish: Himno Nacional Argentino, lit. 'Argentine national hymn') was first adopted as the sole official song of the new de facto state led by Buenos Aires on 11 May 1813—three years after the May Revolution. The Buenos Aires-born politician Vicente López y Planes wrote the lyrics and the Catalan musician Blas Parera wrote the music.

Since the year of the Revolution (1810), Buenos Aires poets and musicians created a number of patriotic or national songs. However, they were not generally adopted, and felt into oblivion. A song commissioned in 1813, instead, became popular through the Argentine territory and beyond. After several revisions, this piece became the Argentine National Anthem. Since the late 19th century, only the first and last verses and the chorus of the 1813 "Patriotic March" are sung, omitting the emotional text about the struggle for independence from Spain.

11 May is celebrated in Argentina as the Argentine National Anthem Day (Día del Himno Nacional Argentino).

== Designation ==
The third Buenos Aires national song was originally named "Marcha Patriótica" (English: Patriotic March), later renamed "Canción Patriótica Nacional" (English: "National Patriotic Song"), and then "Canción Patriótica" (English: "Patriotic Song"). The current designation, "Himno Nacional Argentino" (English: Argentine National Anthem) first appeared on a manuscript arrangement dated around 1848.

== History ==
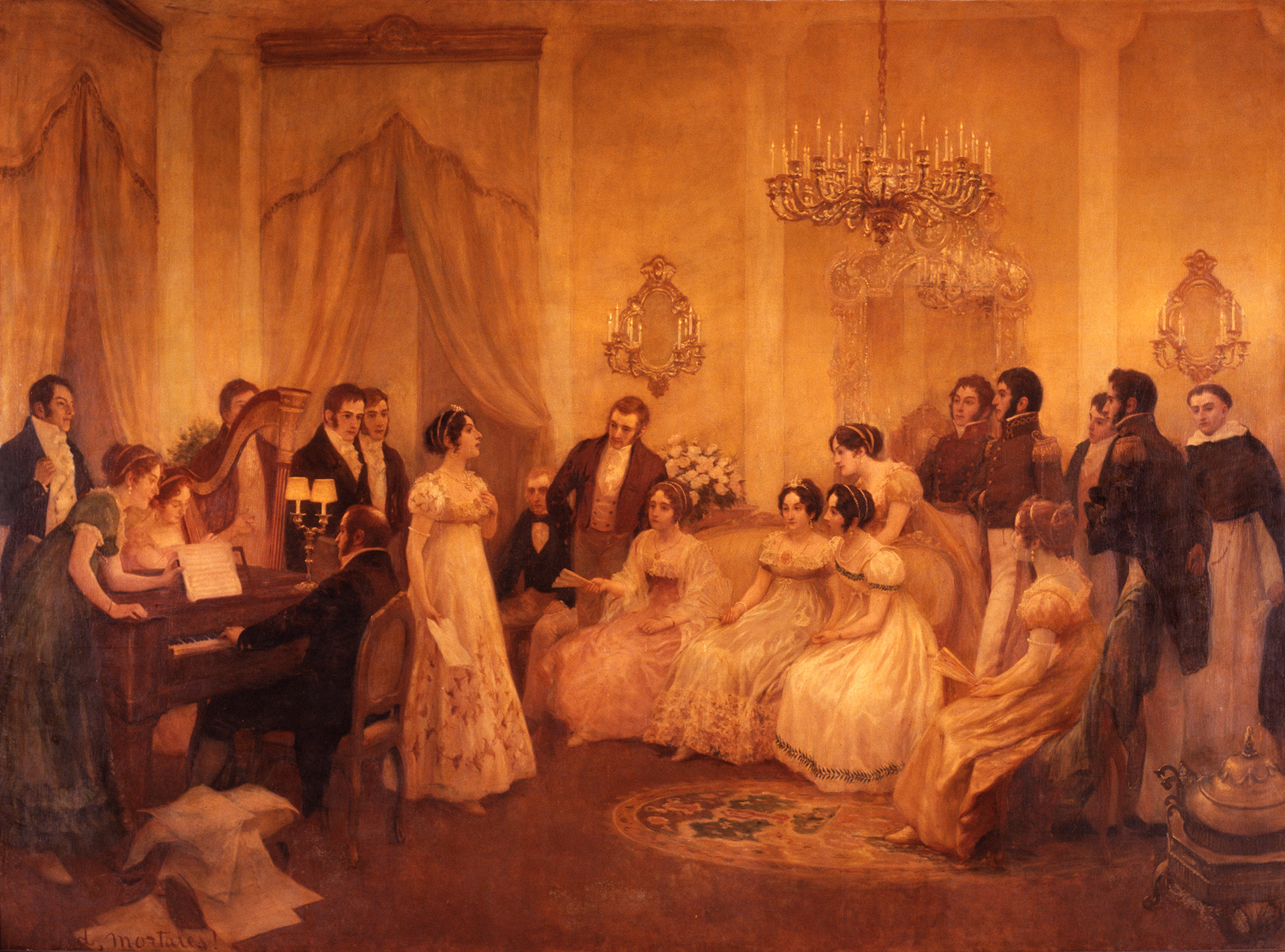
The Argentine National Anthem being played for the first time in Mariquita Sánchez's house (painting by Pedro Subercaseaux)

The earliest national song of Buenos Aires was a "Patriotic March", published on 15 November 1810 in the government newspaper, Gazeta de Buenos Ayres. Even though the publication is anonymous, it is generally believed that Esteban de Luca wrote the poem and Blas Parera (1776–1840) contributed the music. This original composition made no reference to the name of Argentina (the national entity led by Buenos Aires did not became a stable nation-state designated as "República Argentina" until 1861; the national song predated the country and much contributed to its establishment) or to any politically independent entity. The poem primarily addressed France's subjugation of Spain in the Peninsular War, the absolutist restoration begun by the Council of Regency, and the need to keep the republican freedoms achieved so far in the Americas: "Spain was victim / of the plotting Gaul / because to the tyrants / she bent her neck / If there treachery / has doomed a thousands cities / let sacred freedom and union reign here / Let the father to the sons / be able to say / enjoy rights / that I did not enjoy".

In mid-1812, the ruling triumvirate ordered the Buenos Aires Cabildo to commission a national anthem. Cayetano Rodríguez, a Franciscan friar, wrote a text that was approved on 4 August. The Catalan musician Blas Parera, music director of the local theater, set it to music, and conducted the premiere in the theater on 1 November.

Less than a year later the Assembly of Year XIII estimated that the song was not effective enough to serve as a national song. The recent triumphs of the Buenos Aires army rendered the 1812 text obsolete. On 6 March 1813, several poets were invited to submit lyrics. The poem by the lawyer Vicente López y Planes was unanimously considered the best. The words were designated as the "sole national march" ("única marcha nacional") on 11 May 1813 and were published as a broadside three days later. Parera was asked to compose a new musical setting around the same date. He finished the piece in a few days. An unconfirmed oral tradition has it that the premiere took place on 14 May 1813, at the home of the patrician Mariquita Sánchez de Thompson. If this is true, then Parera wrote quickly and under no visible coercion. However, he possibly expressed his dislike of the new nation by quoting a negative gesture (in minor mode, and with dissonant chords) from an anti-Napoleonic war song. He again conducted the official premiere in the theater on 28 May, for which he received a handsome 200 pesos.

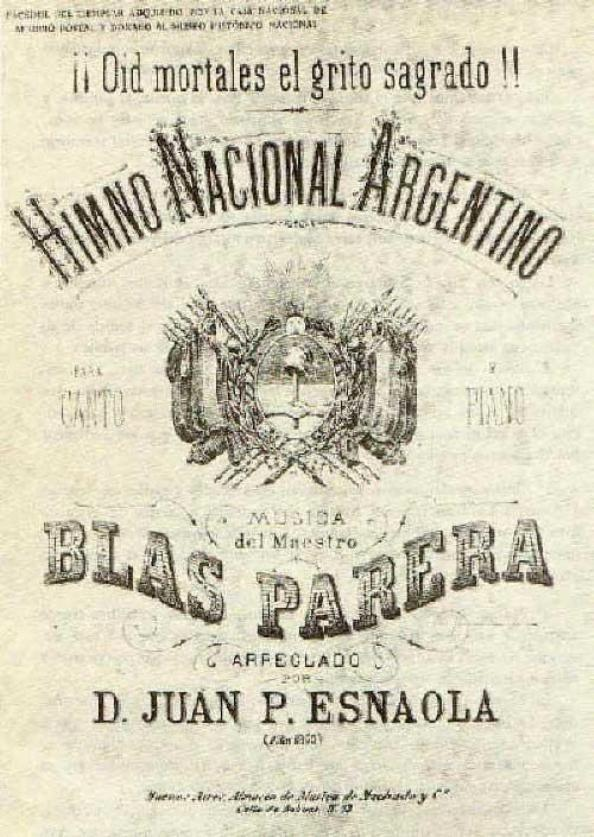
Title page of Esnaola's 1860 arrangement of the Argentine Anthem.

The composition was then known as Canción Patriótica Nacional (National Patriotic Song), and later simply as Canción Patriótica (Patriotic Song), but Juan Pedro Esnaola's first arrangement, dated around 1848, used the title Himno Nacional Argentino (although a republic of that name did not yet exist), and the name has been retained until today. In the complete version of the Anthem of May (as was christened by López) it is noted that the political vision portrayed is not only Argentine, but Latin American. The lyrics are ardently pro-independence and anti-Spanish, as the territory was at that time fighting for its independence.

The song became popular immediately. Within ten years, documented performances occurred throughout Argentina, and also in Chile, Peru, and Colombia, where this patriotic song was in use until local anthems were created. Widespread singing resulted in the emergence of diverse versions, which was an obstacle for mass singing; several successive reforms were then proposed. In 1860, the Buenos Aires composer, Juan Pedro Esnaola (1808–1878), was commissioned to produce an official, revised version. He took the task to heart, making many changes to the music, including a slower tempo, a fuller texture, alterations to the melody, and enrichment of the harmony. In 1927 a committee produced a revisionist version that undid several of Esnaola's changes, but introduced awkward skips in the vocal melody. After a heated public debate fueled by the newspaper La Prensa, this version was rejected and, following the recommendations of a second committee, Esnaola's edition was reinstated. In 1944, this version was confirmed as the official state anthem.

Throughout the 19th century the anthem was sung in its entirety. However, once harsh feelings against Spain had dissipated, and the country had become home to many Spanish immigrants, President Julio Argentino Roca radically abridged the text by decree, on 30 March 1900:

"Without producing alterations in the lyrics of the National Anthem, there are in its verses some that perfectly describe the concept that nations universally support regarding their anthems in peaceful times, and that harmonize with the serenity and dignity of thousands of Spaniards that share our life, those that can and must be preferred to be sung in official parties, for they respect the traditions and the law in no offense to anyone, the President of the Republic decrees that: In official or public festivals, as well as in public schools, only the first and last verses and the chorus of the National Song sanctioned by the General Assembly on May 11, 1813 shall be sung."

== Controversy ==
The song includes a line that has given rise to controversy: Buenos Aires se [o]pone a la frente / de los pueblos de la ínclita union. In the manuscript and an early printed song-sheet the word opone is used; a slightly later version of the song-sheet correcting obvious errors such as spelling mistakes was issued with the same date of 14 May 1813, but with opone changed to pone. The meaning reverses: "Buenos Aires opposes the front of the people of the union" to "Buenos Aires positions itself at the front ...". The original opone has been interpreted as advancing part of the centralist views in Buenos Aires, but has also been considered a "tragical misprint". In several other places, the anthem goes beyond the Argentine theater of the Spanish American wars of independence and fleetingly references events in Mexico, Central America, Northern South America, and Charcas. Blooming ideas of independence appear in lines such as "On the face of the earth rises / a new and glorious nation, / her head is crowned with laurel, / and a Lion lies defeated at her feet". The lion is an allegory that portrays not just Spanish absolutism, but Spain itself, as the enemy.

No anti-Spanish text is sung today.

== Usage ==
Performance of the national anthem is mandatory during all official events, and Argentines in attendance are expected to stand up and sing it. Uniformed personnel must salute during the playing, while troops on parade must present arms. Radio broadcasters voluntarily perform the anthem at midnight, while TV channels do so before closing down their daily broadcast. On national holidays, it is mandatory to perform the national anthem at midnight.

The national anthem is ruled in Argentine law by Decree 10302/1944.

Rock musician Charly García broke legal regulations dealing with the reproduction of the song when he included an idiosyncratic cover version in his 1990 album Filosofía barata y zapatos de goma, stirring much controversy. In 1998 various Argentine artists reedited the anthem and other patriotic songs in the joint album El Grito Sagrado. Other singers followed on their footsteps, recreating the piece in their own ways.

A line from the original version of the national anthem was used as the Argentine title of the 1928 film known in English as The Charge of the Gauchos.

The national anthem appears at the beginning of the 1985 film The Official Story, an Academy Award winner.

=== Short instrumental versions ===
Abridged band instrumental version
c. 2003 recording by the United States Navy Band of the abridged version, used at occasions requiring brevity, such as soccer games.

Due to the excessive length of the official full-length version, which has a duration of around three to four minutes, during international sporting events such as professional soccer games, the Rugby World Cup, and the Olympics, only the instrumental introduction (which has a duration of around 1 minute) is played. Another variation is to play the instrumental introductory section followed by the last three lines (with the third line repeated). Since 2019, in professional soccer games, the final part of the anthem is played, which consists of the instrumental part before the chorus, the chorus, and the coda. The Olympic Games currently uses an abridged version of the anthem which consists of the entire modern version's lyrics, with the pre-chorus instrumental omitted. Although traditional, these arrangements are not recognized by Argentine law.

== Lyrics ==
=== Modern version ===
The following is the modern version, adopted in 1924, omitting the long anti-Spanish middle section.

Spanish original

Oíd, mortales, el grito sagrado:
"¡Libertad! ¡Libertad! ¡Libertad!"
Oíd el ruido de rotas cadenas
ved en trono a la noble igualdad

Ya su trono dignísimo abrieron
las Provincias Unidas del Sud
y los libres del mundo responden:
𝄆 "¡Al gran pueblo argentino, salud!" 𝄇
𝄆 Y los libres del mundo responden:
"¡Al gran pueblo argentino, salud!" 𝄇

Sean eternos los laureles,
𝄆 que supimos conseguir. 𝄇
Coronados de gloria vivamos
¡O juremos con gloria morir!
𝄆 ¡O juremos con gloria morir! 𝄇

English translation

Harken, mortals, the sacred cry:
"Freedom! Freedom! Freedom!"
Hear the sound of broken chains
See noble equality enthroned.

Their most worthy throne have now opened
The United Provinces of the South.
And the free people of the world reply:
𝄆 "To the great Argentine people,hail!" 𝄇
𝄆 And the free ones of the world reply:
"To the great Argentine people, hail!" 𝄇

May the laurels be eternal
𝄆 that we were able to achieve 𝄇
Let us live crowned with glory
Or let us swear with glory die!
𝄆 Or let us swear with glory die! 𝄇

=== Full lyrics ===
Spanish original

I
Oíd, mortales, el grito sagrado:
¡Libertad, libertad, libertad!
Oíd el ruido de rotas cadenas,
Ved en trono a la noble igualdad.
Se levanta a la faz de la Tierra
una nueva y gloriosa Nación,
coronada su sien de laureles,
𝄆 y a sus plantas rendido un león. 𝄇
𝄆 coronada su sien de laureles,
y a sus plantas rendido un león. 𝄇

Coro:
Sean eternos los laureles,
𝄆 que supimos conseguir 𝄇
Coronados de gloria vivamos
¡o juremos con gloria morir!
𝄆 ¡o juremos con gloria morir! 𝄇

II
De los nuevos campeones los rostros
Marte mismo parece animar
la grandeza se anida en sus pechos:
a su marcha todo hacen temblar.
Se conmueven del Inca las tumbas,
y en sus huesos revive el ardor,
lo que va renovando a sus hijos
𝄆 de la Patria el antiguo esplendor, 𝄇
𝄆 lo que va renovando a sus hijos
de la Patria el antiguo esplendor. 𝄇

Coro

III
Pero sierras y muros se sienten
retumbar con horrible fragor:
todo el país se conturba por gritos
de venganza, de guerra y furor.
En los fieros tiranos la envidia
escupió su pestífera hiel;
su estandarte sangriento levantan
𝄆 provocando a la lid más cruel, 𝄇
𝄆 su estandarte sangriento levantan
provocando a la lid más cruel. 𝄇

Coro

IV
¿No los véis sobre México y Quito
arrojarse con saña tenaz
y cuál lloran, bañados en sangre,
Potosí, Cochabamba y La Paz?
¿No los véis sobre el triste Caracas
luto y llantos y muerte esparcir?
¿No los véis devorando cual fieras
𝄆 todo pueblo que logran rendir? 𝄇
𝄆 ¿No los véis devorando cual fieras
todo pueblo que logran rendir? 𝄇

Coro

V
A vosotros se atreve, argentinos,
el orgullo del vil invasor;
vuestros campos ya pisa contando
tantas glorias hollar vencedor.
Mas los bravos, que unidos juraron
su feliz libertad sostener,
a estos tigres sedientos de sangre
𝄆 fuertes pechos sabrán oponer, 𝄇
𝄆 a estos tigres sedientos de sangre
fuertes pechos sabrán oponer. 𝄇

Coro

VI
El valiente argentino a las armas
corre ardiendo con brío y valor,
el clarín de la guerra, cual trueno,
en los campos del Sud resonó.
Buenos Ayres se opone a la frente
de los pueblos de la ínclita unión,
y con brazos robustos desgarran
𝄆 al ibérico altivo león, 𝄇
𝄆 y con brazos robustos desgarran
al ibérico altivo león. 𝄇

Coro

VII
San José, San Lorenzo, Suipacha,
ambas Piedras, Salta y Tucumán,
La Colonia y las mismas murallas
del tirano en la Banda Oriental.
Son letreros eternos que dicen:
aquí el brazo argentino triunfó,
aquí el fiero opresor de la Patria
𝄆 su cerviz orgullosa dobló, 𝄇
𝄆 aquí el fiero opresor de la Patria
su cerviz orgullosa dobló. 𝄇

Coro

VIII
La victoria al guerrero argentino
con sus alas brillante cubrió,
y azorado a su vista el tirano
con infamia a la fuga se dio.
Sus banderas, sus armas se rinden
por trofeos a la libertad,
y sobre alas de gloria alza el pueblo
𝄆 trono digno a su gran majestad, 𝄇
𝄆 y sobre alas de gloria alza el pueblo
trono digno a su gran majestad. 𝄇

Coro

IX
Desde un polo hasta el otro resuena
de la fama el sonoro clarín,
y de América el nombre enseñando
les repite: "¡Mortales, oíd!:
ya su trono dignísimo abrieron
las Provincias Unidas del Sud".
Y los libres del mundo responden:
𝄆 "Al gran pueblo argentino, ¡salud!" 𝄇
𝄆 Y los libres del mundo responden:
"Al gran pueblo argentino, ¡salud!" 𝄇

Coro

English translation

I
Oh, hear ye mortals, the sacred cry:
Liberty, liberty, liberty!
Hear the noise of chains broken,
see noble Equality in its throne.
On the face of the Earth rises
a new and glorious Nation,
its brow crowned with laurels,
𝄆 and a Lion defeated at its feet, 𝄇
𝄆 its brow crowned with laurels,
and a Lion defeated at its feet. 𝄇

Chorus:
May eternal be the laurels,
𝄆 That we knew how to win 𝄇
Crowned in glory, let's live
or let's swear with glory to die!
𝄆 Or let's swear with glory to die! 𝄇

II
The faces of the new champions
Mars himself seems to encourage
Greatness makes its nest in their chests:
at their march they make everything tremble.
The tombs of the Inca are shaken,
and the passion returns to their bones
which begins to renew, for their children,
𝄆 their Fatherland's ancient splendour, 𝄇
𝄆 which begins to renew, for their children,
their Fatherland's ancient splendour. 𝄇

Chorus

III
But mountains and walls are felt
echoing with horrible noise:
the whole country is disturbed by cries
of revenge, of war and uproar.
The envy within the fierce tyrants
spat its pestiferous bile;
their bloody standard they raise
𝄆 provoking the cruelest fight, 𝄇
𝄆 their bloody standard they raise
provoking the cruelest fight. 𝄇

Chorus

IV
Don't you see them over Mexico and Quito
lunge forth with stubborn rage
and how cry, bathed in blood,
Potosí, Cochabamba and La Paz?
Don't you see them over sad Caracas
sow grief and tears and death?
Don't you see them devour like beasts
𝄆 every people that surrenders to them? 𝄇
𝄆 Don't you see them devour like beasts
every people that surrenders to them? 𝄇

Chorus

V
It challenges you, Argentines,
the pride of the vile invader;
your fields he stomps on, counting
all the glorious victories he left behind.
But the brave men that swore, united,
their merry liberty to uphold,
these bloodthirsty tigers
𝄆 with strong chests they'll know to face, 𝄇
𝄆 these bloodthirsty tigers
with strong chests they'll know to face. 𝄇

Chorus

VI
The valiant Argentine to arms
runs burning with strength and valour.
The bugle of war, like thunder,
echoed in the fields of the South.
Buenos Ayres resists, at the front
of the peoples of the illustrious Union,
and with strong arms they tear apart
𝄆 the arrogant Iberian lion, 𝄇
𝄆 and with strong arms they tear apart
the arrogant Iberian lion. 𝄇

Chorus

VII
San José, San Lorenzo, Suipacha,
both Piedras, Salta and Tucumán,
La Colonia and the very walls
of the tyrant in the Banda Oriental.
Are eternal signboards that say:
here the Argentine arm triumphed,
here the fierce oppressor of the Fatherland
𝄆 bent his proud neck, 𝄇
𝄆 here the fierce oppressor of the Fatherland
bent his proud neck. 𝄇

Chorus

VIII
The Argentine warrior Victory
covered with her shining wings,
and dismayed at her sight the tyrant
with infamy took to flight.
His flags, his arms are surrendered
as trophies to Liberty,
and on wings of glory she raises the people,
𝄆 a throne worthy of their great majesty, 𝄇
𝄆 and on wings of glory she raises the people,
a throne worthy of their great majesty. 𝄇

Chorus

IX
From one pole to the other echoes
the resounding bugle of fame,
and of America, teaching its name,
it repeats: "Mortals, hear ye:
Now the United Provinces of the South
have opened their most worthy throne".
And the free people of the world reply:
𝄆 "To the great Argentine people: cheers!" 𝄇
𝄆 And the free people of the world reply:
"To the great Argentine people: cheers!" 𝄇

Chorus
