= Salinas de Chaca =

- Locality
- Salinas de Jaca
- Location within Aragon Location within Spain
- Coordinates: 42°24′45″N 0°47′21″W
- Country: Spain
- Autonomous community: Aragon
- Province: Province of Huesca
- Municipality: Las Peñas de Riglos
- Elevation: 608 m (1,995 ft)

Population
  - Total: 23

Salinas de Chaca or Salinas de Jaca is a locality located in the municipality of Las Peñas de Riglos, in Huesca province, Aragon, Spain. As of 2020, it has a population of 23.

== Geography ==
Salinas de Chaca is located 53km northwest of Huesca.
