= Villalangua =

- Locality
- Location within Aragon Location within Spain
- Coordinates: 42°25′9″N 0°48′11″W
- Country: Spain
- Autonomous community: Aragon
- Province: Province of Huesca
- Municipality: Las Peñas de Riglos
- Elevation: 639 m (2,096 ft)

Population
  - Total: 14

Villalangua is a locality located in the municipality of Las Peñas de Riglos, in Huesca province, Aragon, Spain. As of 2020, it has a population of 14.

== Geography ==
Villalangua is located 55km northwest of Huesca.
