= Flora Azcuénaga =

Argentine philanthropist

Flora Azcuénaga (1767-1850) was an Argentine philanthropist. In 1823, she was one of the founders of the philanthropic society Sociedad de Beneficencia.
