= Santa María d'a Penya =

- Locality
- Santa María
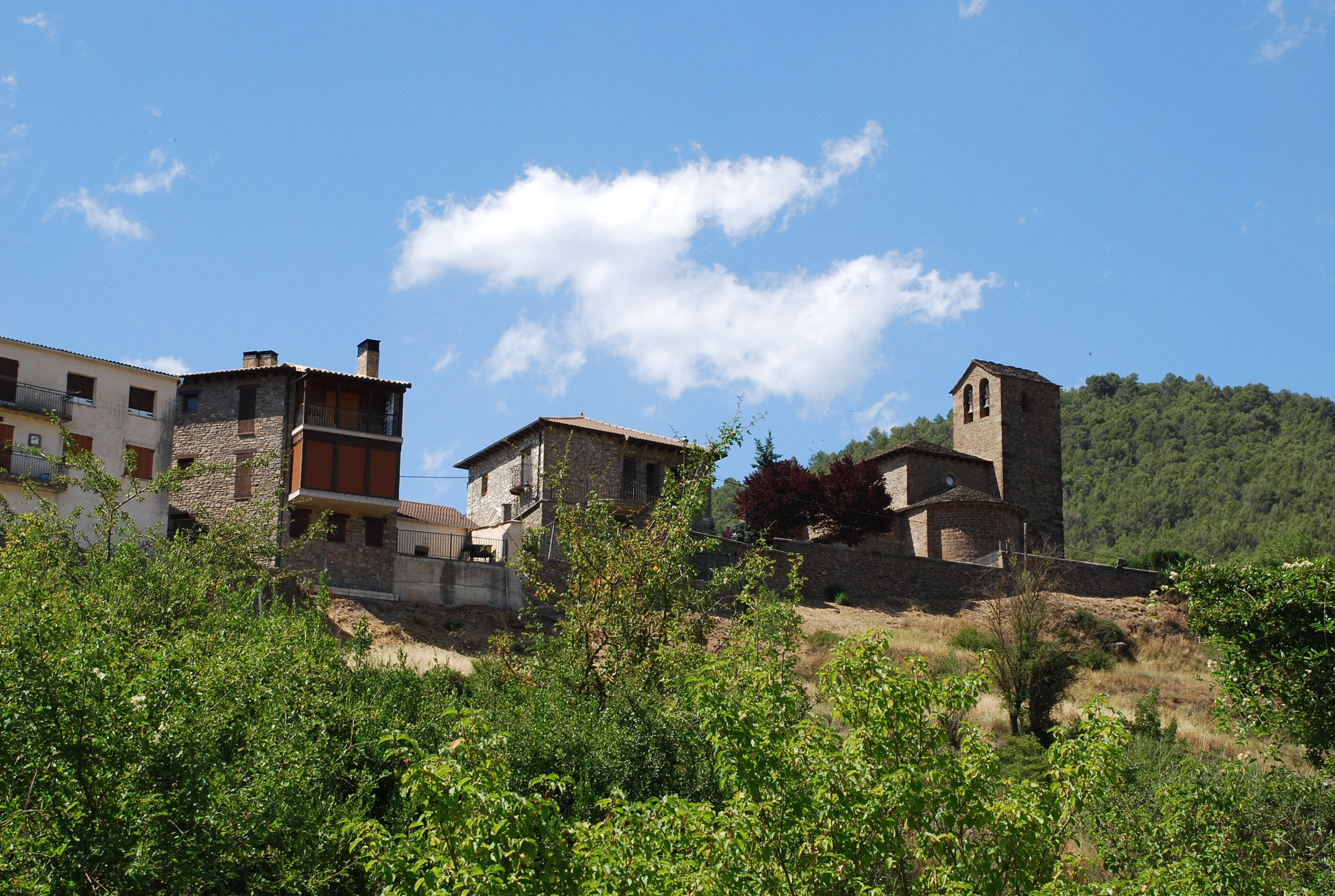

- Location within Aragon Location within Spain
- Coordinates: 42°23′38″N 0°44′31″W
- Country: Spain
- Autonomous community: Aragon
- Province: Province of Huesca
- Municipality: Las Peñas de Riglos
- Elevation: 588 m (1,929 ft)

Population
  - Total: 20

Santa María d'a Penya or Santa María is a locality located in the municipality of Las Peñas de Riglos, in Huesca province, Aragon, Spain. As of 2020, it has a population of 20.

== Geography ==
Santa María d'a Penya is located 48km northwest of Huesca.
