= Centenero =

- Locality
- Location within Aragon Location within Spain
- Coordinates: 42°25′35″N 0°39′54″W
- Country: Spain
- Autonomous community: Aragon
- Province: Province of Huesca
- Municipality: Las Peñas de Riglos
- Elevation: 709 m (2,326 ft)

Population
  - Total: 11

Centenero is a locality located in the municipality of Las Peñas de Riglos, in Huesca province, Aragon, Spain. As of 2020, it has a population of 11.

== Geography ==
Centenero is located 60km north-northwest of Huesca.
