= A Penya =

- Locality
- La Peña Estación
- Location within Aragon Location within Spain
- Coordinates: 42°22′54″N 0°41′50″W
- Country: Spain
- Autonomous community: Aragon
- Province: Province of Huesca
- Municipality: Las Peñas de Riglos
- Elevation: 549 m (1,801 ft)

Population
  - Total: 41

A Penya or La Peña Estación is a locality located in the municipality of Las Peñas de Riglos, in Huesca province, Aragon, Spain. As of 2020, it has a population of 41.

== Geography ==
A Penya is located 52km northwest of Huesca.
