= Patricias Argentinas =

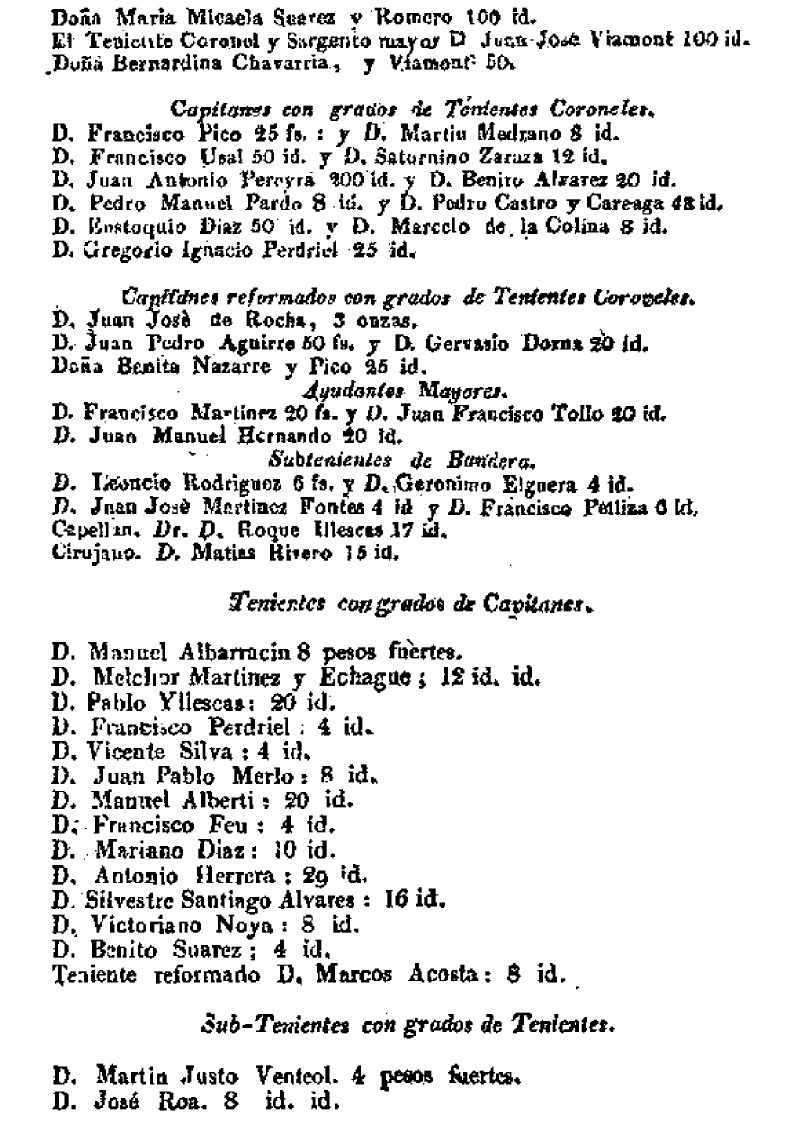

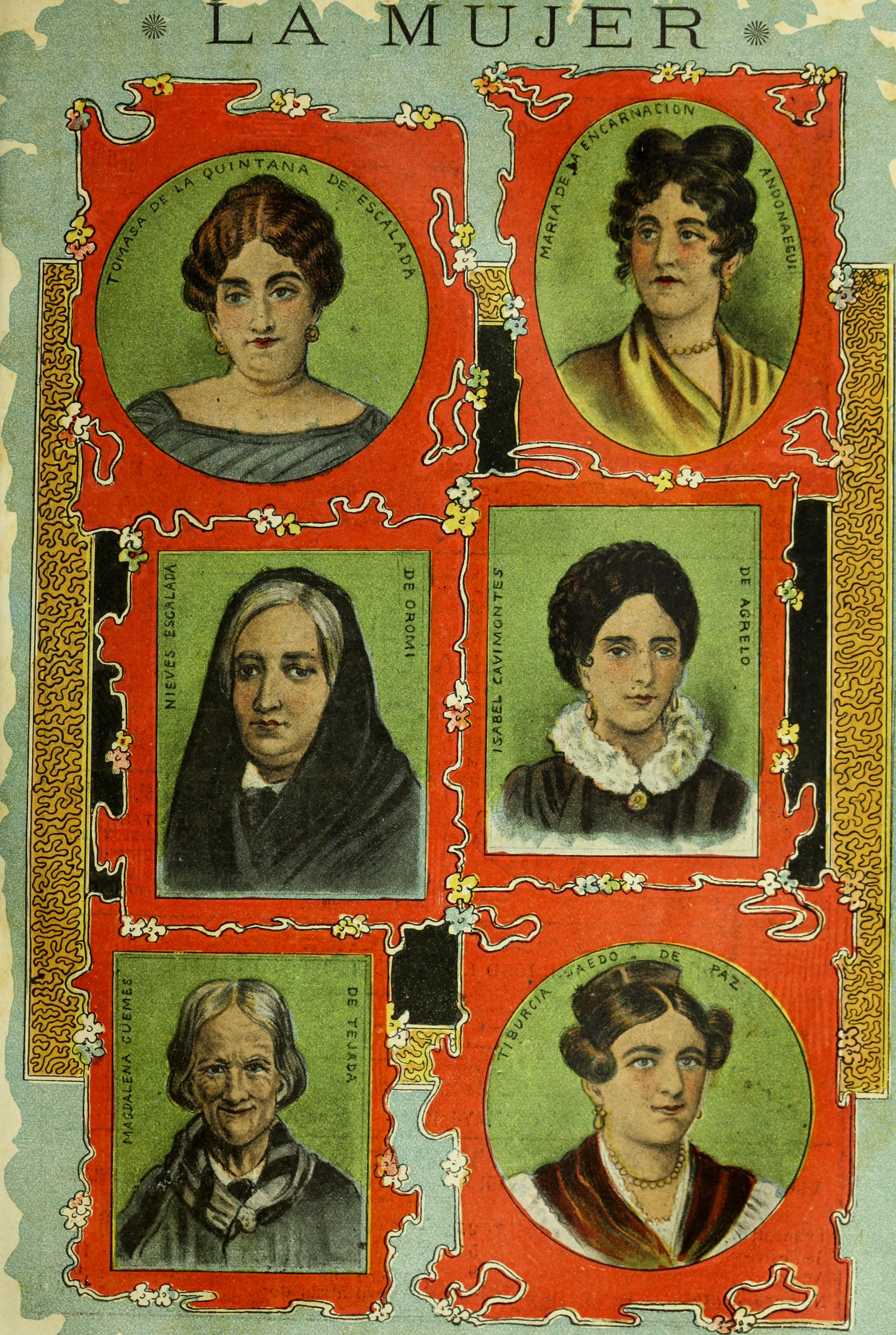

The Patricias Argentinas (English: "Argentine Patricians"), also known as the Sociedad Patriótica (English: "Patriotic Society"), is an honorific title given to a group of fourteen elite women from Buenos Aires who, on 30 May 1812, each pledged to donate a rifle in support of the patriotic cause during the Argentine War of Independence.

== Signatures of the original list ==
1. Tomasa de la Quintana
2. María de los Remedios de Escalada
3. María de las Nieves de Escalada
4. María Eugenia de Escalada de Demaría
5. María de la Quintana
6. María Sánchez de Thompson
7. Carmen de la Quintanilla de Alvear
8. Ramona Esquivel y Aldao
9. Petrona Bernardina Cordero
10. Rufina de Orma
11. Isabel Calvimontes de Agrelo
12. Magdalena de Castro de Herrero
13. Ángela Castelli de Irgazábal
14. María de la Encarnación Andonaégui de Valdepares.
