= Rasal, Spain =

Rasal
- Locality
- Location within Aragon Location within Spain
- Coordinates: 42°22′34″N 0°34′52″W
- Country: Spain
- Autonomous community: Aragon
- Province: Province of Huesca
- Municipality: Las Peñas de Riglos
- Elevation: 708 m (2,323 ft)

Population
  - Total: 19

Rasal is a locality located in the municipality of Las Peñas de Riglos, in Huesca province, Aragon, Spain. As of 2020, it has a population of 19.

== Geography ==
Rasal is located 41km north-northwest of Huesca.
