= Ena Twigg =

British psychic medium

Ena Twigg (1914-1984) was a British psychic medium.

Born in Gillingham in Kent on 6 January 1914, Twigg claimed psychic ability from an early age. She married Harry Twigg, a soldier in the Royal Navy. Twigg became a minister of a Spiritualist Church

The most-publicized incident involving Twigg was her claim that she had communicated with the spirit of James Pike Jr., a man who had committed suicide in 1966. Twigg gave Bishop Pike information to him about himself and his son James.

Although Twigg denied formerly knowing anything about Pike and his son, the magician and skeptic investigator John Booth suspected that Twigg had already known information about the Pike family before the séances. Twigg had belonged to the same denomination of Bishop Pike, he had preached at a cathedral in Kent, and Booth speculated that she had known information about him and his deceased son from newspapers. Researcher Georgess McHargue also wrote that Twigg may have obtained information from newspapers.
