= Ena Murray =

Ena Murray (27 December 1936 – 20 May 2015) was an Afrikaans writer. During the 33 years that she wrote full-time, 131 titles appeared from her pen. She acquired renown mainly for her romance novels, but also wrote detective fiction, espionage fiction and adventure novels through which she reached a wide audience. In addition she wrote spiritual literature and produced a volume of poetry.

She has been described has the "most read writer in Afrikaans". In a survey by Radio Sonder Grense and Tafelberg-Uitgewers she was deemed the most popular writer in Afrikaans.

Some of her books appeared in large print, aiding the visually impaired. Some were recorded by Pionier School, a special education school in Worcester, while others were recorded by Bandhulp vir Blindes in braille en band (an institution assisting the blind).

== Biography ==
Ena Murray was born in the small Karoo town of Loxton. She was the second of three daughters of the local medical practitioner, Dr. Mans. She received her schooling at Loxton and the neighbouring town of Victoria West. After matriculating she worked as a nurse.

She married Boet Murray of Loxton, thus returning to her birth town, where her literary career started in earnest. The marriage would last twenty years. After her divorce she settled in Wilderness in the southern Cape. Two years later she married Jaques Mostert and after ten years they moved to a retirement village in Mossel Bay, where she died on 4 June 2015, at the age of 78.

== Research and writing style ==
Many of her novels were semi-biographical and these often proved popular. Apparently her readers identified with the characters, leading to filming of two novels. The first film was Vrou uit die nag (Woman emerging from the night) by the Christian film company Carfo, and the well-known Plekkie in die son (Place in the sun) which had the theme of a leprosy shelter.

She is considered to be a thorough researcher of the topics of her novels, who doesn't start writing unless this first phase is complete. Whether it be historic, medical or geographic knowledge that is required, she is considered to be versed in the facts of each. When researching Plekkie in die son, she stayed for some time at the leprosy shelter Westfort outside Pretoria, to acquire the necessary insight into such an institution.

== Literary works ==
Note: English titles given here are translations of the Afrikaans, and have not been available as such.

=== Titles (out of print) ===
- Agter die masker (Behind the mask) (1974)
- Die despoot van Duiwelskloof (The despot of Duiwelskloof) (1978)
- Ena Murray-omnibus (Ena Murray-omnibus) (1979)
- Plekkie in die son
- Gasheer van Drakeneiland
- Baas van Babilon
- As die wind daaroor gaan (When the wind blows over it) (1985)
- Sondes van die vaders (Sins of the fathers) (1986)
- Señor die seerower (Señor the pirate) (1987)
- Sê groete vir pappa (Regards to daddy) (1990)
- Die oujongnooi van Polkadraai (The spinster of Polkadraai) (1990)
- Appelbloeisels en jasmyn (Apple blossoms and jasmin) (1990)
- Wanneer die nuwe dag breek (When the new day breaks) (1991)
- Dokter Julene (Doctor Julene) (1991)
- Lise (Lise) (1992)
- Die vrou in die spieël (The woman in the mirror) (1992)
- Die ongebore uur (Unborn hour) (1992)
- En die klippe sal uitroep (The stones will cry out) (1993)
- Die uurglas loop leeg (The hourglass is running empty) (1995)
- Omnibus 27 (1997)
- Omnibus 32 (November 1999)
- Omnibus 35 (August 2001)
- Omnibus 36 (April 2002)
- Omnibus 37 (September 2002) – The 3 titles constitute Die Meissner-sage
- Die Meissner-kliniek (The Meissner clinic)
- Dokter Julene (Doctor Julene)
- Die Ongebore Uur (Unborn hour)
- Omnibus 38 (April 2003)
- Die tonnel (The tunnel)
- Keerkring van die hart (Equinox of the heart)
- Die klippe sal uitroep (The stones will cry out)
- Omnibus 39 (April 2003)
- Omnibus 1 (April 2004)
- Omnibus 2 (June 2004)
- Omnibus 3 (September 2004)
- Omnibus 4 (November 2004)
- Omnibus 5 (April 2005)
- Vreemdeling in Eden (Stranger in Eden)
- Tahiti, verre land (Tahiti, far off land)
- Hartklop van Hawaii (Heartbeat in Hawaii)
- Omnibus 6 (May 2005)
- Tonge Van Vuur (Tongues of Fire)
- Die Geheim van Hercule Cordier (The secret of Hercule Cordier)
- Waar die Wilde Besembos Bloei (Where the Wild Broombush Blossoms)
- Omnibus 7 (September 2005)
- Paspoort na gevaar (Passport to danger)
- 'n Bruidegom vir Lille (Bridegroom for Lille)
- Martelmars van die noodlot (Grueling march of fate)
- Omnibus 8 (November 2005)
- Heerser van die Quinta (Ruler of the Quinta)
- Oos na die son (East of the sun)
- Merk van die skarabee (Mark of the scarabee)

=== Titles (still in print) ===
- Omnibus 9 (April 2006) – These three titles constitute Die Hammanshof-sage
- Luidende simbale (Sounding cymbals)
- Dieplood
- Groter liefde as dit (A greater love)
- Omnibus 10 (June 2006)
- Die reëngod Tlaloc (The rain god Tlaloc)
- Vlug van die albatros (The flight of the albatross)
- Koning van die Kanaku (King of the Kanaku)
- Omnibus 11 (October 2006)
- Die spookvrou van Santa Catalina (Ghost woman of Catalina)
- Roep van die Naguil (Call of the Nightjar)
- 'n Bruid vir graaf Debussy (A bride for count Debussy)
- Ena Murray Gunstelinge (November 2006)
- Verwonde Jare (Wounded years)
- Sê Groete Vir Pappa (Regards to daddy)
- Op Pad Na Kanaän (On the way to Canaan)
- Die Wit Koningin (The White Queen)
- Omnibus 12 (December 2006)
- Lied van die Campino's (Song of the Campinos)
- Altaarvure op Kandavu (Altar flames on Kandavu)
- Koninkryk van Ricardo (Empire of Ricardo)
- Omnibus 13 (April 2007)
- Die Droster van Doringbaai (The deserter of Doringbaai)
- Die despoot van Duiwelskloof (The despot of Duiwelskloof)
- Waters van Siloa (Waters of Siloa)
- Omnibus 14 (June 2007)
- Die glimmende simitar (The glinting scimitar)
- Maanlig oor die Amasone (Moonlight over the Amazon)
- 'n Eiland in die son (An island in the sun)
- Omnibus 15 (September 2007)
- Sluiers van die nag (Veils of the night)
- Wewenaar van Groene Weide (Widower of green meadows)
- Boeie van goud (Fetters of gold)
- Omnibus 16 (November 2007)
- Onrus op Oshakati (Unrest at Oshakati)
- Regters oor gister (Judges of yesterday)
- Weerklank van die liefde (Echo of love)
- Omnibus 17 (April 2008)
- Rabbedoe van Rietkuil (Tomboy of Rietkuil)
- Waar die nagtegaal sing (Where the nightingale sings)
- My afgemete deel (My measured share)
- Omnibus 18 (June 2008)
- Diena van Die Eike (Dina of The Oaks)
- Soveel blye dae (So many joyous days)
- Helder is die nag (Bright is the night)
