= Ena Vazquez-Nuttall =

Puerto Rican psychologist

- Born: January 27, 1937; Salinas, Puerto Rico
- Died: October 20, 2011 (aged 74); Framingham, Massachusetts

Academic background
- Education: University of Puerto Rico (BA); Radcliffe College (MA); Boston University (EdD)
- Thesis: Creativity in boys; a study of the influence of social background, educational achievement, and parental attitudes on the creative behavior of ten year old boys (1969)

Ena Vazquez-Nuttall (1937 - 2011) was a Puerto Rican psychologist known for her work on the relevance of cultural diversity in the field of psychology.

== Early life and education ==
Vazquez-Nuttall was born in 1937 in Salinas, Puerto Rico. She has a bachelor's degree from the University of Puerto Rico. She earned a master's degree from Radcliffe College, and an EdD in counseling and school psychology from Boston University.

== Career ==
Vazquez-Nuttall started graduate programs in school psychology at the University of Massachusetts-Amherst and Northeastern University. She was the Associate Dean and Director of Graduate School of the Bouve College of Health Sciences from 1992 until 2004. She retired from Northeastern University in 2009 after working there for 21 years.

== Honors and awards ==
In 1990 the received a National Association of School Psychologists Presidential Award. In 2004 Vazquez-Nuttall was honored by the National Latino Psychological Association. In 2004 she received a lifetime achievement award from the Massachusetts School Psychologists Association, and the association established a scholarship in her name. Upon her death in 2011, Northeastern University's Bouvé College of Health Sciences instituted the Ena Vazquez-Nuttall Award for students who demonstrate outstanding multicultural contributions to the discipline.

== Selected publications ==
- Vazquez-Nuttall, Ena; Romero-Garcia, Ivonne; Leon, Brunilda De (1987). "Sex Roles and Perceptions of Femininity and Masculinity of Hispanic Women: A Review of the Literature". Psychology of Women Quarterly. 11 (4): 409–425. doi:10.1111/j.1471-6402.1987.tb00915.x. ISSN 0361-6843.
- Nuttall, Ena Vazquez; Romero, Ivonne; Kalesnik, Joanne, eds. (1999). Assessing and screening preschoolers: psychological and educational dimensions (2nd ed.). Boston: Allyn and Bacon. ISBN 978-0-205-26676-0.
- Sue, D. W., Carter, R. T., Casas, J. M., Fouad, N. A., Ivey, A. E., Jensen, M., LaFromboise, T., Manese, J. E., Ponterotto, J. G., & Vazquez-Nutall, E. (1998). Multicultural counseling competencies: Individual and organizational development. Sage Publications, Inc.
- Vazquez-Nuttall, Ena; Li, Chieh; Kaplan, Jason P. (2006-10-18). "Home-School Partnerships with Culturally Diverse Families: Challenges and Solutions for School Personnel". Journal of Applied School Psychology. 22 (2): 81–102. doi:10.1300/J370v22n02_05. ISSN 1537-7903.
