= Mallos de Riglos =

Mountain in Spain

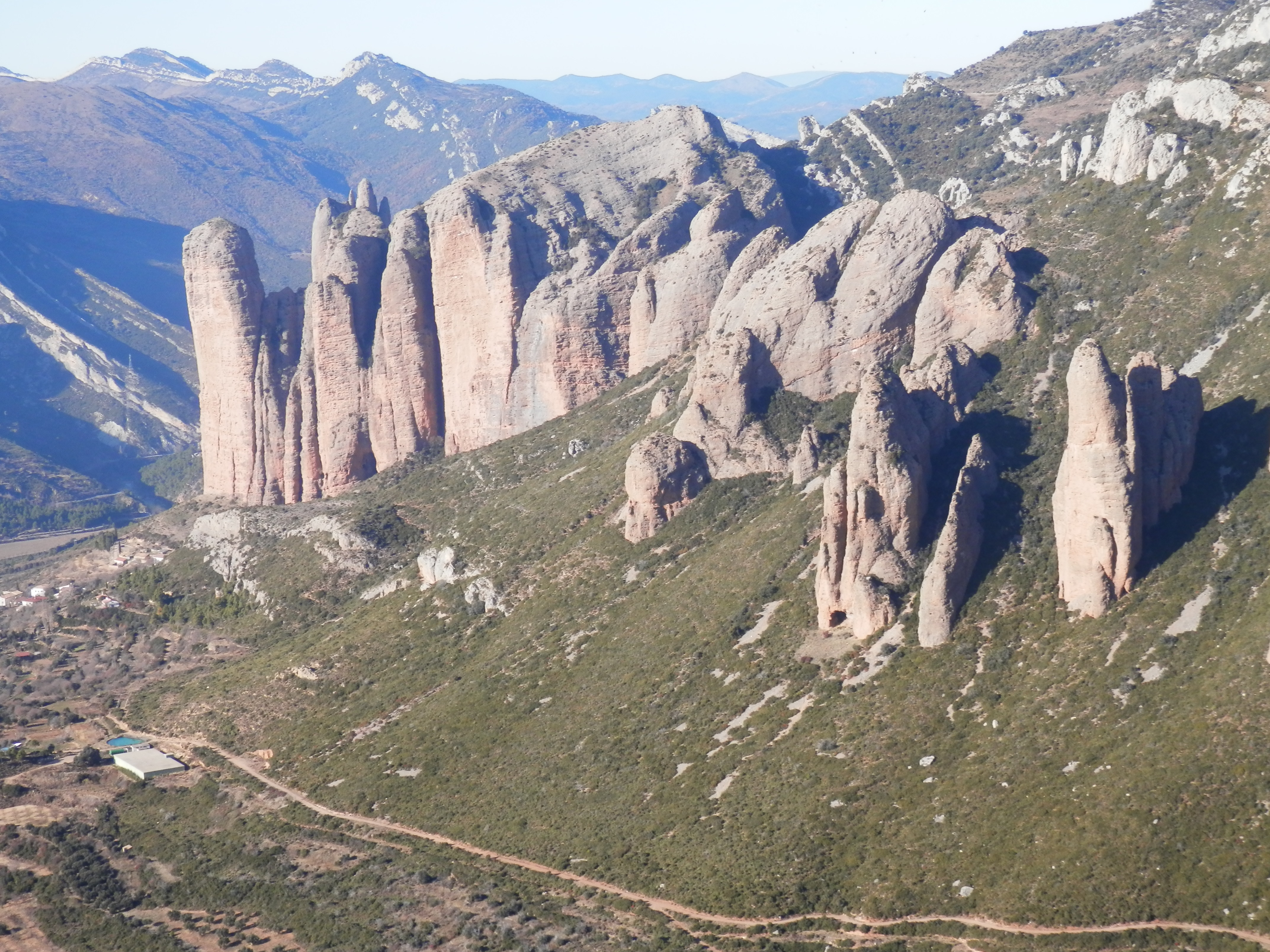
- Mallos de Riglos from the Massif d'os Fils.

Highest point
- Elevation: 1,045 m (3,428 ft)
- Coordinates: 42°21′05″N 0°43′27″W

Geography
- Location within Pyrenees
- Location: Hoya de Huesca, Aragon, Spain
- Parent range: Pre-Pyrenees

Geology
- Mountain type: Conglomerate (Miocene)

Climbing
- First ascent: Unknown
- Easiest route: From Las Peñas de Riglos

The Mallos de Riglos (English: Mallets of Riglos) are a set of conglomerate rock formations, located in the municipality of Las Peñas de Riglos, in the Hoya de Huesca comarca, in Aragon, Spain. They are located near Las Peñas de Riglos some 45 km (28 mi) to the northwest of the city of Huesca. Rising to some 300 metres (980 ft) high (c. 1000 metres or 3,300 ft (1,000 m) above sea level), they form part of the foothills of the Pyrenees.

The Mallos were formed when eroded material washed down from the slopes of the Pyrenees and became cemented together by limestone. Over time, this mixture became compacted into a large mass of conglomerate rock. Eventually, erosion wore away the softer, more porous parts of the conglomerate. The more resistant rock remained, and became the formations known as the Mallos de Riglos.

Because of their relatively vertical sides, the Mallos de Riglos are a popular destination for climbers.

== Gallery ==
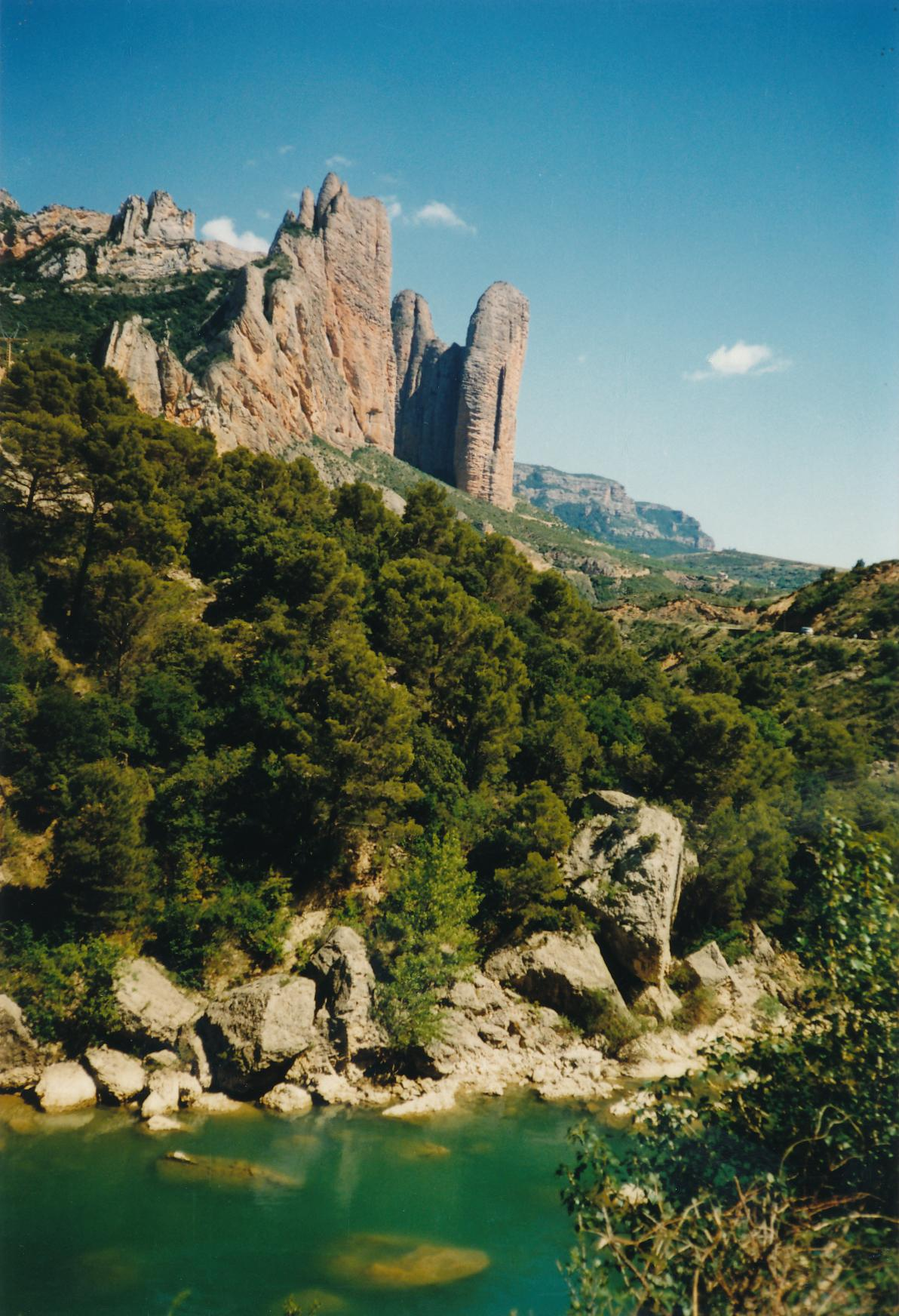
