= Bodega Riglos =

- Industry: Winemaking
- Founded: 2002
- Headquarters: Gualtallary, Mendoza, Argentina
- Website: http://www.bodegariglos.com/en

Bodega Riglos is an Argentine producer of premium wines from Gualtallary, Tupungato, Alto Valle de Uco, Mendoza, located at 4,000 ft (1,300 m) above sea level.

The company is headed by its founders, Darío Werthein (president) and Fabián Suffern (vice-president). They acquired 160 acres (72 hectares) in Gualtallary to set the vineyards in 2002. Rafael Calderón was inducted as CEO and partner of the firm in 2011.

== Finca Las Divas ==
Riglos makes its single-vineyard wines with grapes from Finca Las Divas (located at the foot of the Andes), where it works with the concept of precision viticulture. The method uses a continuing improvement program of quality for its technology, aimed at the understanding of each sector of the vineyard and the uniformity and consistency of harvested grapes. The production also contemplates the sustainability philosophy to manage the vineyard while protecting the ecosystem of Las Divas.

The finca was set up according to the following distribution of varietals:

- Malbec: 18 ha (44.2 ac)
- Cabernet Sauvignon: 9.2 ha (22.3 ac)
- Cabernet Franc: 5.9 ha (14.2 ac)
- Petit Verdot: 1 ha (2.2 ac)
- Sauvignon Blanc: 3.36 ha (8.3 ac)

With a production of 90,000 bottles per year, Bodega Riglos commercialises 6 types of wine:

- Riglos Gran Corte (Malbec-based blend)
- Riglos Gran Malbec
- Riglos Gran Cabernet Sauvignon
- Riglos Gran Cabernet Franc
- Riglos Quinto Malbec
- Riglos Quinto Sauvignon Blanc

75% of production is exported to Brazil, Canada, Colombia, United States, Denmark, England, Italy, Hong Kong and Uruguay. In Argentina it is sold the remaining 25% in top restaurants and wine shops throughout the country.

== Awards ==
In 2012, Gran Corte Riglos 2009 was voted as the best wine of the year for the American magazine Wine Enthusiast, thus marking a milestone in the history of company.
