= Enas Al-Ghoul =

Palestinian agricultural engineer

Enas Al-Ghoul (Arabic: إيناس الغول) is a Palestinian agricultural engineer specializing in rural development and environmental initiatives in the Gaza Strip. Her work includes creating projects focused on recycling waste materials and developing solar-powered devices to address water and energy challenges during humanitarian crises.

== Career ==
In 2020, Al-Ghoul started a project called "Ibra wa Sinara" ("Needle and Thread"), focusing on recycling waste materials such as fabric, leather, wood, and metal. The project employed five women, including two with hearing disabilities. It produced items such as clothing, bags, and furniture. This initiative was based on her research, which highlighted textile and leather waste as the most prevalent types of waste in the Gaza Strip. She promoted environmental awareness and recycling through community workshops and training sessions.

In 2023, she expanded her recycling efforts by introducing additional training programs and community meetings aimed at women in rural areas. The workshops taught participants about recycling techniques and the associated environmental benefits. She faced logistical challenges, such as limited electricity availability in Gaza, which restricted her operations to the hours when power was accessible.

Following the conflict in Gaza in October 2023, Al-Ghoul developed a solar-powered desalination device using simple materials such as wood, glass, and tarpaulin. The device was designed to convert seawater into drinkable water, addressing the scarcity of clean water caused by the destruction of infrastructure in Khan Yunis. She also created a solar-powered cooker and continued to produce items from recycled materials to support displaced individuals. In December 2024, she was listed on the BBC 100 Women.
