= Las Peñas de Riglos =

Riglos: Las Peñas de Riglos (Spanish) As Penyas de Riglos (Aragonese)
- Municipality
- Las Peñas de Riglos
- Location within Spain Location within Aragon
- Coordinates: 42°20′56″N 0°43′36″W
- Country: Spain
- Autonomous Community: Aragon
- Province: Huesca
- Comarca: Hoya de Huesca
- Municipality: Las Peñas de Riglos

Government
  - Mayor: Juan Ramón Aso Bailo (PSOE)

Area
  - Total: 234.9 km^{2} (90.7 sq mi)
- Elevation: 678 m (2,224 ft)

Population (2025-01-01)
  - Total: 263
  - Density: 1.12/km^{2} (2.90/sq mi)
- Website: www.laspenasderiglos.es

Las Peñas de Riglos (Aragonese As Penyas de Riglos) is a municipality located in the Hoya de Huesca comarca, province of Huesca, in Aragon, Spain. It is formed by the merger of several towns and whose capital city is Riglos. According to the 2004 census (INE), the municipality has a population of 282 inhabitants.

== Natural sites ==
- Mallos de Riglos
- Protected landscape of San Juan de la Peña and Monte Oroel

== Images of the town of Riglos ==
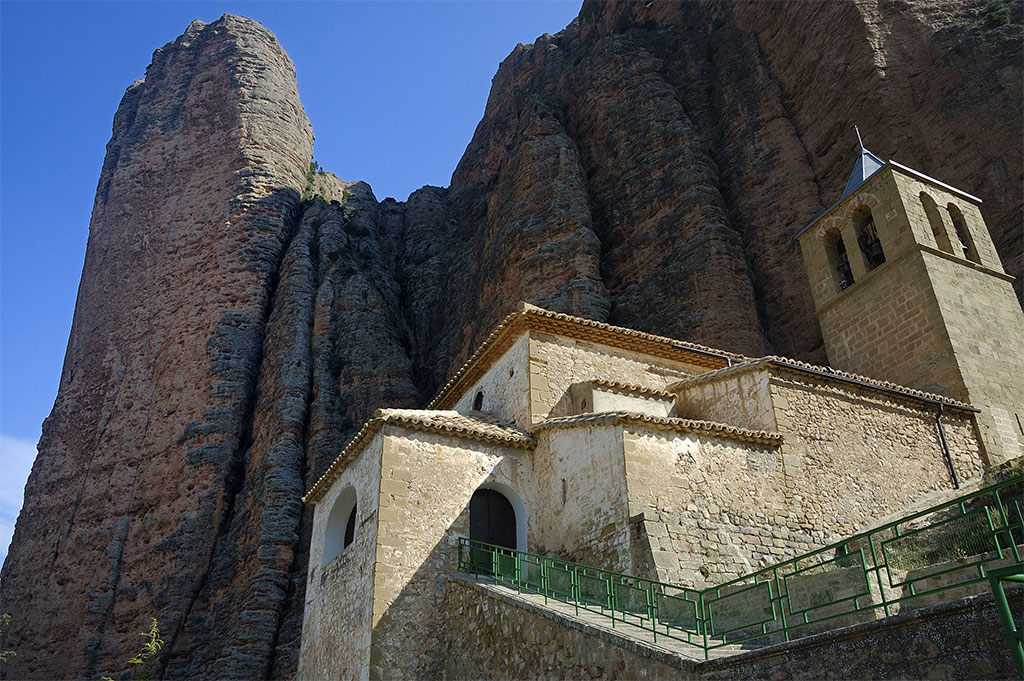
Iglesia de San Martín

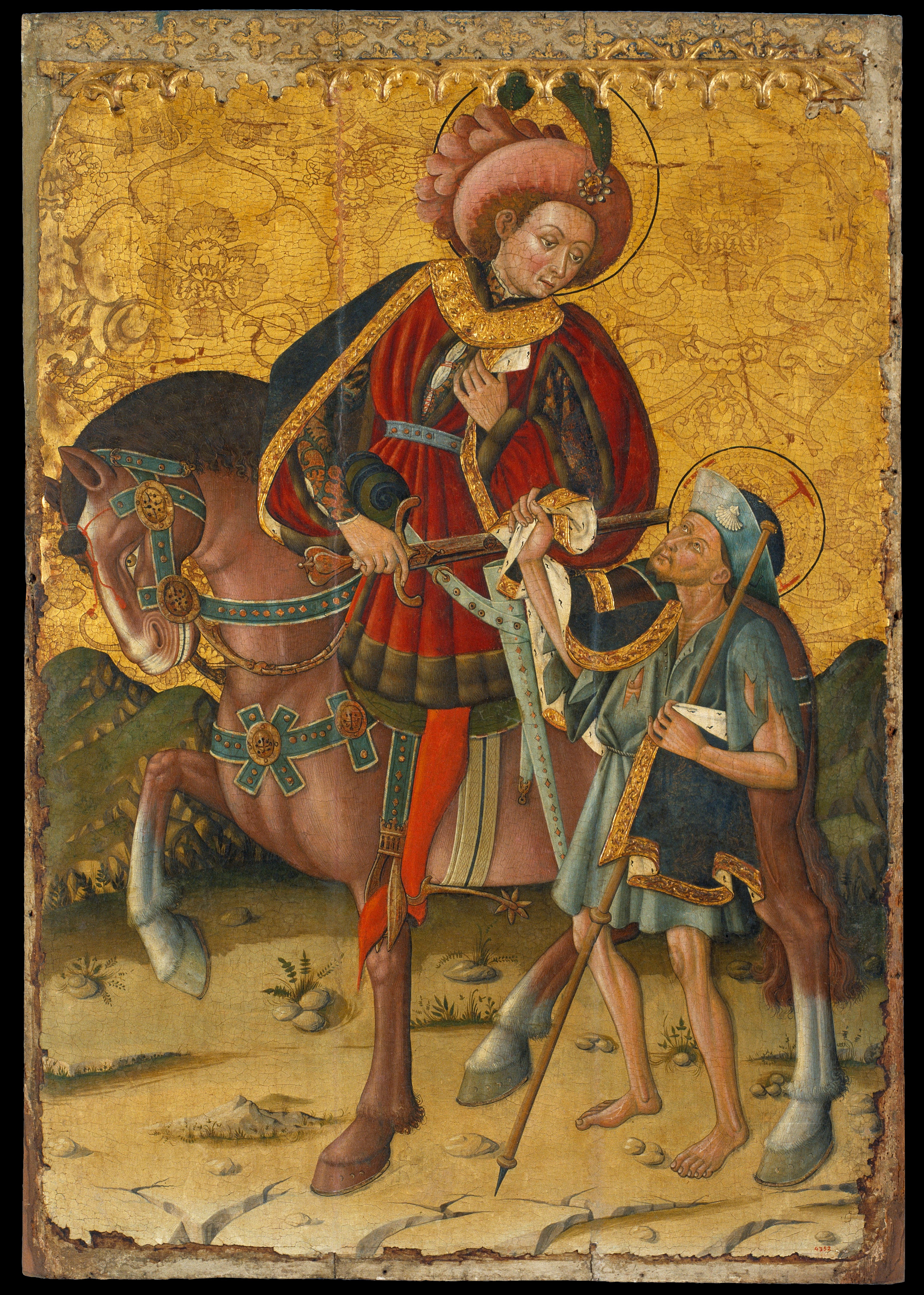
Saint Martin Sharing his Cloak (c. 15th century) by Blasco de Gañén from the Iglesia de San Martín. Now located in Museu Nacional d'Art de Catalunya, Barcelona.

== Towns within the municipality ==
- A Penya
- Carcavilla
- Centenero
- Ena
- Fanyanars
- Rasal
- Riglos
- Salinas de Chaca
- Santa María d'a Penya
- Triste
- Villalangua
- Yeste

== See also ==
- List of municipalities in Huesca
