= Ena, Pañas de Riglos =

Ena
- Locality
- Location within Aragon Location within Spain
- Coordinates: 42°26′50″N 0°41′34″W
- Country: Spain
- Autonomous community: Aragon
- Province: Province of Huesca
- Municipality: Las Peñas de Riglos
- Elevation: 767 m (2,516 ft)

Population
  - Total: 19

Ena is a locality located in the municipality of Las Peñas de Riglos, in Huesca province, Aragon, Spain. As of 2020, it has a population of 19.

== Geography ==
Ena is located 62km north-northwest of Huesca.

== History ==
From the 11th to the 19th century, Ena was part of the domains of the Monastery of San Juan de la Peña. In the Middle Ages, there was a monastery called San Martín de Ena. In 1834, it became a municipality. In addition to the village itself, the municipality of Ena included the hamlets of Cerzún, Botayuela, Lanzaco, Ordaniso, Bergosal, Lagé, Visús, Rompesacos, Cercito, Camparés, Pilón, Javarraz, and Carcavilla.

In 1414, it was a royal domain

In 1610, it belonged to the Monastery of San Juan de la Peña.

In 1845, it had 32 houses, a town hall, and a municipal school attended by 46 students.

Between 1960 and 1970, it was merged with Riglos, Salinas de Jaca, and Triste to form the new municipality of Las Peñas de Riglos, with its administrative center in Riglos.

== Bibliography ==
- Jorge Laliena López. Ena: historia y memoria de un pueblo de Soduruel. Editorial Pirineo, 2021. ISBN 9788417817312
