= Blas Parera =

Spanish composer (1777–1840)

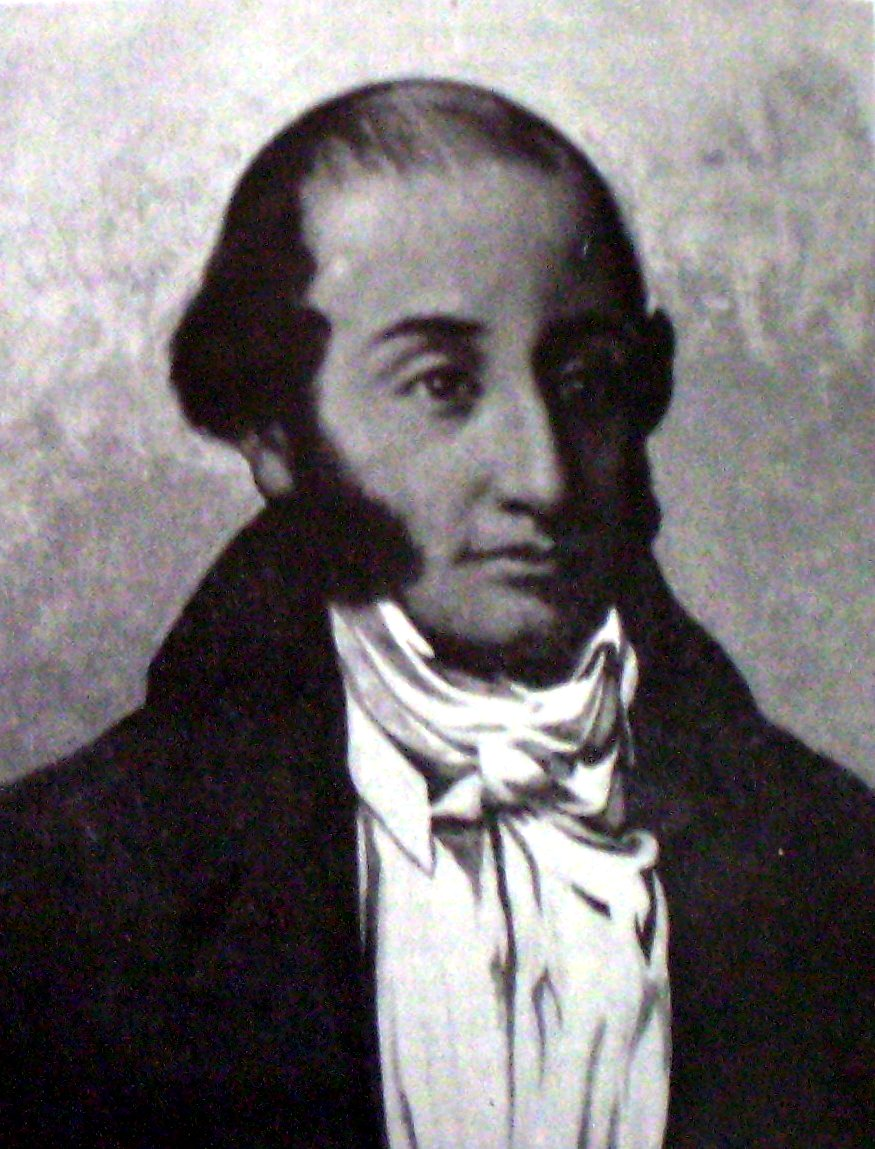
Blas Parera.

Blas Parera Moret (3 February 1776 – 7 January 1840) was a Spanish music composer and teacher. He lived his part of his life in Buenos Aires, Argentina.

He was born in Murcia, Spain to two Catalan parents. In 1797, he moved to Buenos Aires where he contributed in the defense of the port of Buenos Aires during the British invasions of the Río de la Plata. He composed the Marcha Patriotica, which became the Argentine National Anthem, together with songwriter Vicente López y Planes in 1813. He also was a organist in the Metropolitan Cathedral, the Church of St. Ignatius, and the Basilica of Our Lady of Mercy.

On October 14, 1809, Parera married Facunda del Rey, a fifteen-year-old orphan who was a student of his. Before their marriage, she had lived in the Home of the Founding Children orphanage, where she sang in the choir. The two were married in the church of San Nicolás de Bari.

He died in poverty in Mataró, Spain on 7 January 1840. He also lived during the romantic period of arts.
