= Sociedad de Beneficencia de Buenos Aires =

Argentine state institution

The Sociedad de Beneficencia de Buenos Aires, also known as Sociedad de Damas de Beneficencia or simply Sociedad de Beneficencia (English: Society of Beneficence), was an Argentine state institution. The association was created by president Bernardino Rivadavia in 1823. The purpose was to transfer social work from the Catholic church to the association after the Argentine independence.

The first president was the patrician Mercedes de Lasala de Riglos. The organisation was administered by female Argentine philanthropists from the upper classes, with the founding members including Mariquita Sánchez (who presided the organization between 1830–1832 and 1866–1867), María Cabrera de Altolaguirre, Isabel Casamayor, Joaquina de Izquierdo, Josefa Ramos Mejía, Isabel Agüero de Ugalde, Cipriana Viana de Boneo, Manuela Aguirre, María de los Santos Riera del Sar, Bernardina Chavarría de Viamonte, María del Rosario Azcuénaga. Among the organisations placed under the supervision of the society were schools for girls, hospitals and orphanages, such as Casa de Niños Expósitos, Hospital Rivadavia and Casa de Huérfanas.

In 1838, the Governor of Buenos Aires Juan Manuel de Rosas suspended state funding for the Sociedad de Beneficencia. The organization was not formally reinstated until after the end of Rosas's reign in 1852. During the second half of the nineteenth century, the Socieded de Beneficencia administered various schools for girls, women's hospitals, mental institutions, and penitentiaries. The organization also contributed to charitable causes and relief funds outside of Buenos Aires.

The Sociedad de Beneficencia was disbanded during the first presidency of Juan Perón in 1947, after his wife Eva Perón was not invited by the patrons. The chairpersons of this society were traditionally the Papal Nuncio to Argentina and the First Lady of Argentina, but the society refused to extend the invitation to Evita when her husband was elected president. At first they insisted that it was because she was too young; but it was widely interpreted as an insult to the new First Lady. Evita was furious and moved against the society, effectively bringing it to an end. She then created the Eva Perón Foundation to replace it, which she ran and which was much more comprehensive in scope.
