= Yeste, Las Peñas de Riglos =

Hamlet in Aragon, Spain

Coordinates: 42°23′N 0°42′W

Yeste is a hamlet located within municipality of Las Peñas de Riglos, Aragon, Spain, 44 km far from the capital, Huesca. In 2006, it had a population of only 2, being completely unpopulated during the 20th century.

In 1845, it had its own Capital Hall and prison and a population of 117. In that same year, it joined Santa María de la Peña, a slightly larger village located, together with Triste, thus becoming the three of them under the same administrative area.
