= Energy Networks Australia =

Trade association

- Formation: January 2004
- Legal status: Non-profit company (registered in Australia)
- Purpose: Peak national body representing gas distribution and electricity transmission and distribution businesses throughout Australia
- Location: Melbourne, Victoria
- Region served: Australia
- Chief Executive: Dom van den Berg
- Chair: Andrew Bills, CEO, SA Power Networks
- Website: http://www.energynetworks.com.au

Energy Networks Australia (formerly Energy Networks Association) is the national industry body representing Australia’s electricity transmission and distribution and gas distribution networks. Energy Network Australia members provide more than 16 million electricity and gas connections to almost every home and business across Australia.

Energy networks are the lower pressure gas pipes and low, medium and high voltage electricity lines that transmit and distribute gas and electricity from energy transmission systems directly to households, businesses and industry.

Energy Networks Australia provides governments, policy-makers and the community with a single point of reference for major energy network issues in Australia. These issues include the national and state government policy and regulatory environments under which energy networks must operate and key technical issues such as network safety and security of supply, reliability and power quality, the management of peak energy demand and energy efficiency.

Most energy network businesses are subject to an independent economic regulation regime similar to that applying to other utility sectors such as water and telecommunications. State and Territory regulators have undertaken this task in the past, but for states and jurisdictions in the National Electricity Market, this role is undertaken by the Australian Energy Regulator (AER). In WA and the Northern Territory, state regulation continues.

Energy Networks Australia commenced operations as the Energy Networks Association in January 2004 and started trading as Energy Networks Australia on 10 November 2016.
