= Mariquita Sánchez =

Argentine socialite and activist (1786–1868)

Mariquita Sánchez de Thompson
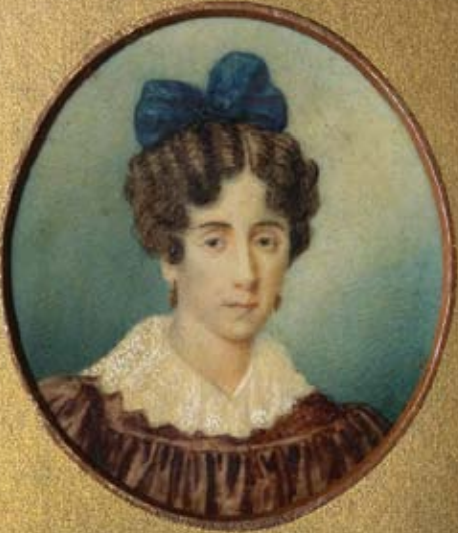
- Jean-Philippe Goulu. María Sánchez de Velazco de Mendeville, c. 1837.
- Born: María Josepha Petrona de Todos los Santos Sánchez de Velasco y Trillo; 1 November 1786; Buenos Aires, Viceroyalty of the Río de la Plata
- Died: 23 October 1868 (aged 81); Buenos Aires, Argentina
- Other name: María de Todos los Santos
- Occupations: Socialite, politician, chronicler
- Known for: Political activism
- Spouses: Martín Thompson (m. 1805; died 1819) Jean Baptiste Washington de Mendeville (m. 1820; died 1863)
- Children: 8

Signature
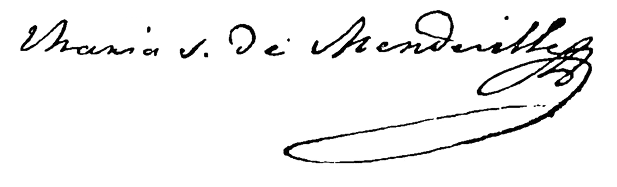

Mariquita Sánchez de Thompson y de Mendeville, also known as Mariquita Sánchez de Thompson (1 November 1786 – 23 October 1868), was an Argentine socialite and activist from Buenos Aires. She was one of the city's leading salonnières, whose tertulias gathered many of the leading personalities of the time. She is widely remembered because the Argentine National Anthem was sung for the first time in her home, on 14 May 1813.

One of the first politically outspoken Argentine women, Mariquita Sánchez de Thompson has been considered the most active female figure in the revolutionary process.

Sánchez married her cousin, Martín Thompson, in 1805. She authored a first-hand account and description of the failed British invasions of Buenos Aires which illustrated the ambivalence felt by the locals regarding the invasions.

She became a widow in 1819, and remarried to French expatriate Washington de Mendeville in 1819 or 1820. During the rule of Juan Manuel de Rosas, she lived in exile in Montevideo, taking periodic trips to Rio de Janeiro before ultimately returning to Buenos Aires after the Battle of Caseros.

== Life ==
=== Early life ===
Mariquita Sánchez de Thompson was born on 1 November 1786 in Buenos Aires to Cecilio Sánchez de Velasco and Magdalena Trillo. Her family was part of the Spanish colonial elite of Buenos Aires and held influential political connections. Because of her family's background, she had a privileged childhood.

=== c. 1800–1819/1820 ===
At 14 years old, Sánchez expressed her desire to marry 23-year-old Martín Jacobo de Thompson, her second cousin on her mother's side. Thompson was a sailor and officer in the Spanish Royal Navy, educated in Europe, and held strong pro-independence ideas. After Sánchez and Thompson's engagement in the winter of 1801, Sánchez's parents banished Thompson from the house, pushing her to marry the much older Diego del Arco from Spain instead. Her father used his political connections within the Royal Navy to transfer Thompson to Spain and send Sánchez to the Casa de Ejercicios, "a place of physical seclusion and spiritual meditation frequently used by parents to punish and persuade their wayward daughters." When her father died in 1802, her mother continued to oppose her marriage to Thompson. However, once Thompson returned from Spain, Sánchez and Thompson took Sánchez's mother to court on 7 July 1804. Sánchez successfully appealed to Viceroy Sobremonte in an 1804 letter, arguing against the predominant custom of marriages being arranged by families without the consultation of the women involved. Permission to marry Thompson against her family's wishes was granted on 20 July 1804, and they wed on either 27 June or 29 July in 1805.

During her marriage to Thompson, Sánchez had a daughter and four sons. She also further established herself as a socialite and a writer. Her name also appeared in La Gaceta on 9 August 1810, with the quote mentioning her reading, "Martín Thompson, capitán de este puerto, ha oblado seis onzas de oro, tres por sí y las tres restantes por su esposa, doña María de los Santos Sánchez." She contributed to the Argentine independence cause, in 1810, by donating three ounces of gold (equivalent to approximately 4800 U.S. dollars in 2020) and in 1812, by sewing uniforms for the "patriot army." She established a salon in Buenos Aires, through "which a network of exiles and Porteños met." Sánchez hosted tertulias, social gatherings similar to salons, that were some of the most renowned in all the Viceroyalty, and which were attended by many aristocrats and officials of the time. After the revolution, the house of Sánchez and Thompson became a center for artistic meetings. At her tertulias, her guests danced, played cards, listened to music, discussed business, books, religion, and politics. Thompson was a political official as well, traveling to the United States in 1817 to "consult emancipation," but he died on the return journey in 1819. After Thompson's death, Sánchez became a widow with five children.

=== c. 1819/1820-1868 ===
In 1819 or 1820 Mariquita married Jean-Baptiste Washington de Mendeville, a French aristocrat and part of the French Consulate in Buenos Aires. Their marriage has been described as an unhappy one. Sánchez began to be in favor of divorce beginning in the 1830s. However, their union proceeded until Mendeville was sent back to France in 1835. After marrying Mendeville, she continued to host tertulias at her house, continuing her home's status as a center for "music, plastic arts, and welfare work as well as politics." In 1823, she worked with President Bernardino Rivadavia and founded the Sociedad de Beneficencia, the first philanthropic institution run by Buenos Aires women to protect and educate women, which allowed them to participate in public life. During the dictatorship of Juan Manuel de Rosas, the Sociedad de Beneficencia was dismantled and Sánchez went into exile in Montevideo, Uruguay, during which she wrote a significant portion of her letters and recorded works. In 1846, Sánchez went to Rio de Janeiro, and when she returned to Montevideo she wanted to go to Europe, but she ultimately decided to settle down. She died in Buenos Aires on 23 October 1868.

== Works and themes ==
Sánchez is most known for her letters written to family while in exile and was described as a human typewriter that wrote intensely and passionately. Her writing has been characterized as masterful, as a result of her well-educated childhood, with her works being widely received as having a "civilized and enlightened spirit." Her writings included personal letters, poems, memos, a diary and an account on life in colonial Buenos Aires. The Colonial Memoir that she wrote regarding life in Buenos Aires under the Viceroyalty touched on all aspects of life in the city including: the home and furnishings, clothes and shoes, food and restaurants, education, marriage, gender roles, death, cultural experiences and more.

Sánchez's works carried prominent themes of feminism, exploring it from the aspects of equality, education, and female sexual conduct's influence on politics. Sanchez wrote a letter to Juan Bautista Alberdi, a prominent Argentine author, in which she stated, "My life is necessarily more that of a male philosopher than that of a woman, with the misfortune of having the heart of a woman." Her compositions also explore ideas of nationality and citizenship, given her background with husbands from European countries and life in a colonial nation. Her Diary from Montevideo was written in 1839–1840, transmitting and analyzing political data. Sánchez's letters written from 1804 to 1868 and her Diary from Montevideo were finally published in 1952.

== Legacy and significance ==
Sánchez is remembered largely for her political activism and advocacy for women, including her involvement with the Sociedad de Beneficencia. Mónica Szurmuk referred to her as "the most important female figure of Argentinean early republican life". This was not only because of the political work which she undertook through them, but also because of the extensive list of prominent individuals she was connected with through them. Sánchez is also thought to have been the first person to sing the Argentine National Anthem—which was said to have been sung for the first time at her house 14 May 1813—a claim that even appears in elementary school textbooks. She is also remembered for her writings and her tertulias. Sánchez has even been described as a "symbol of the nation" in many ways.

The 1954 Luis César Amadori historical film El Grito sagrado depicts the story of Sánchez. Fanny Navarro plays Sánchez.

== Discrepancies in Sánchez's history ==
The nature of Sánchez's relationship with Mendeville has been called into question, as some accounts have her married and pregnant with his child in 1819, the same year that her previous husband Thompson died. Additionally, a fortune was left to her as a result of Thompson's death, which has been used to suggest Mendeville to be a fortune-seeker. Although Sánchez lived in exile in Montevideo, there is evidence of her returning to Buenos Aires multiple times. There is also record that she resided in Buenos Aires from 1847 to 1851, raising uncertainty about the nature of her exile. As dictator, Rosas put many restrictions on the travel of his political opponents, denying them passage to other countries. There are no records of these restrictions being placed on Sánchez, which implies the possibility that her political role at the time was inflated.

== Gallery ==
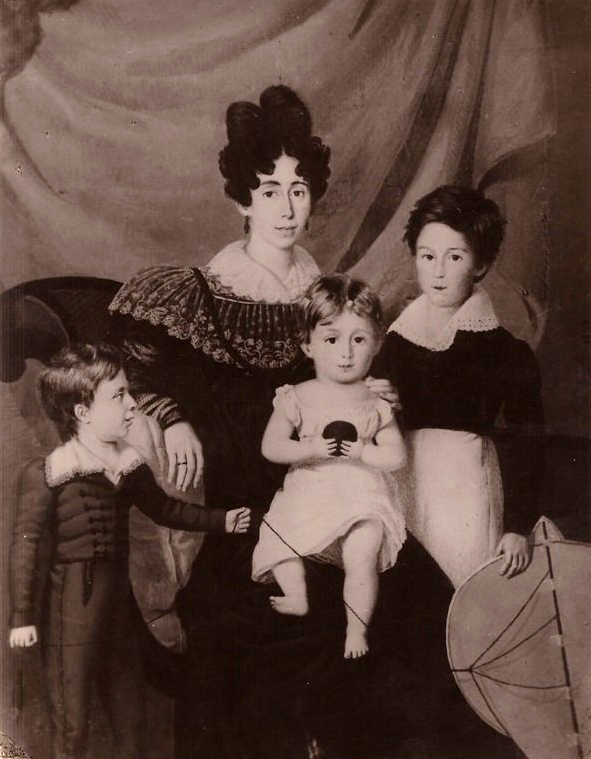
Portrait of Sánchez de Thompson and her children by Jean-Philippe Goulu, ca. late 1820s

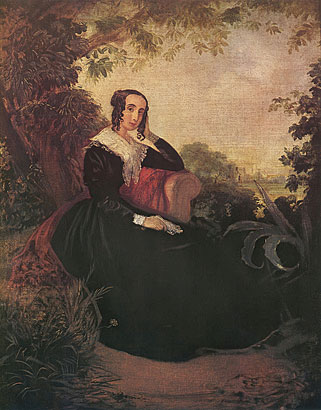
María Sánchez de Mendeville (1845), portrait by Johann Moritz Rugendas, National Historical Museum

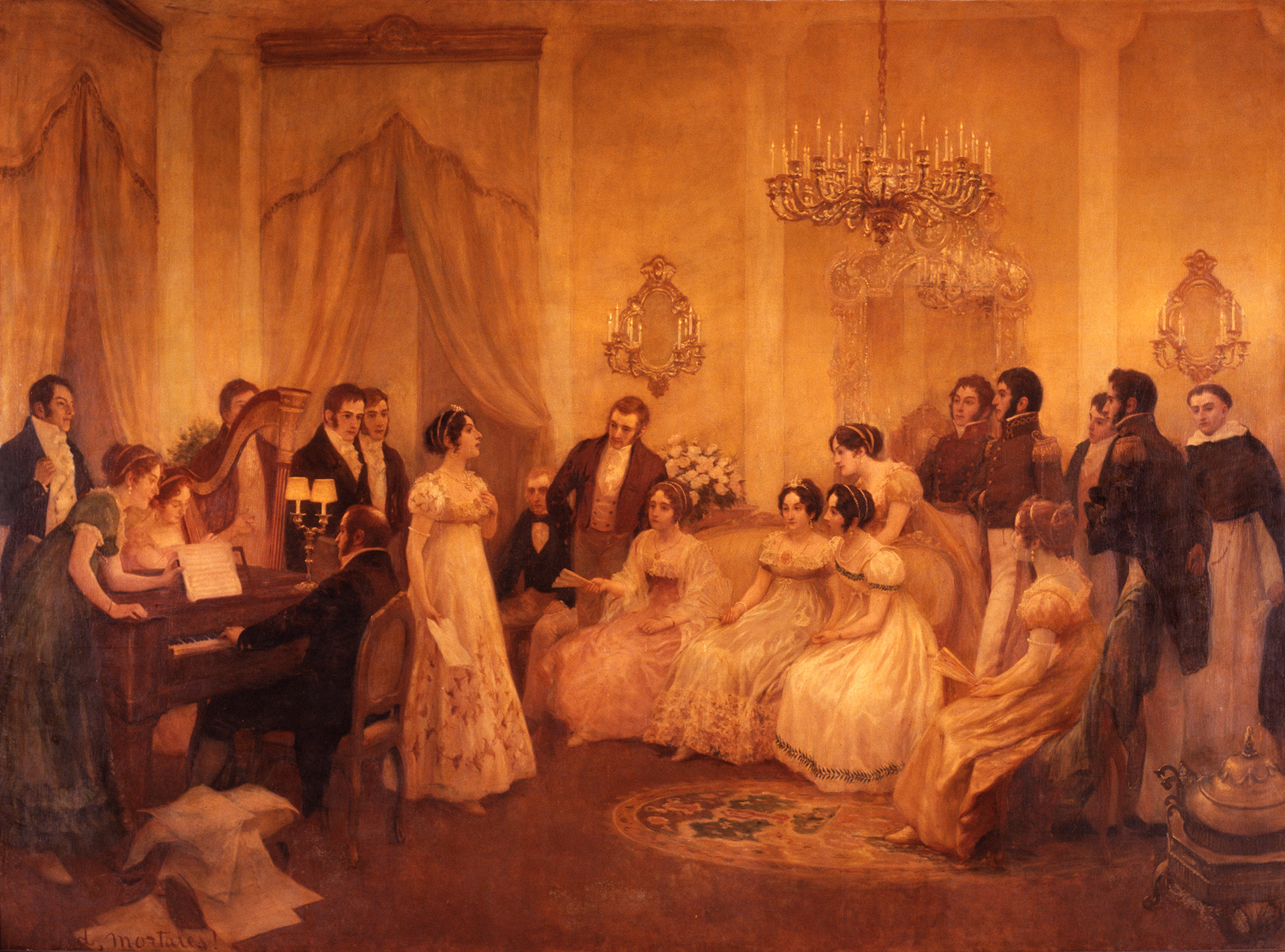
The Argentine National Anthem being played for the first time at Sánchez de Thompson's house. Painting by Pedro Subercaseaux

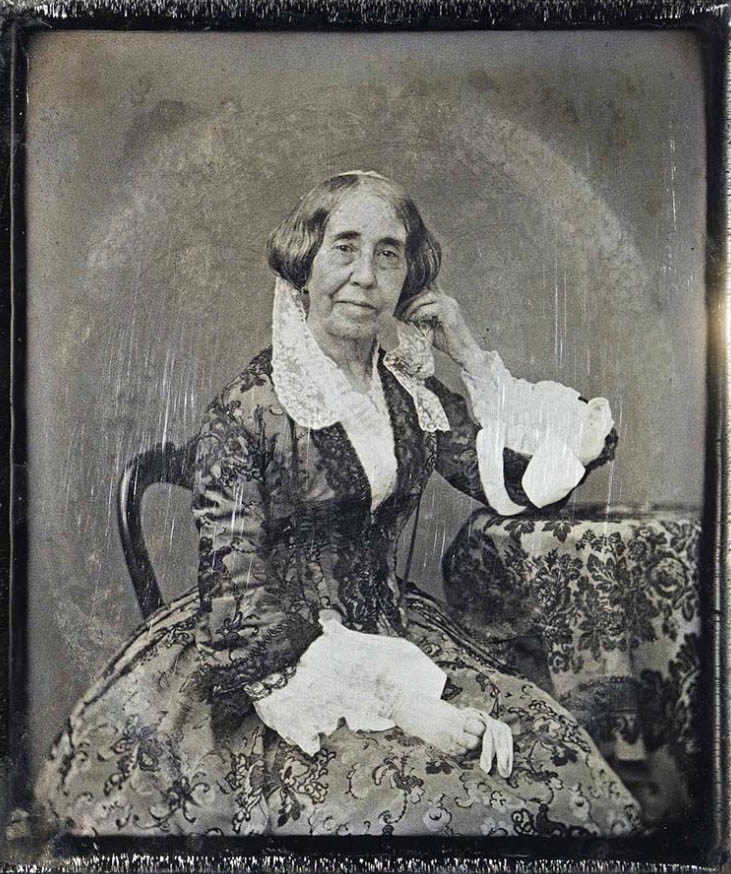
The only known photographic image of Sánchez de Thompson, a daguerreotype from 1854

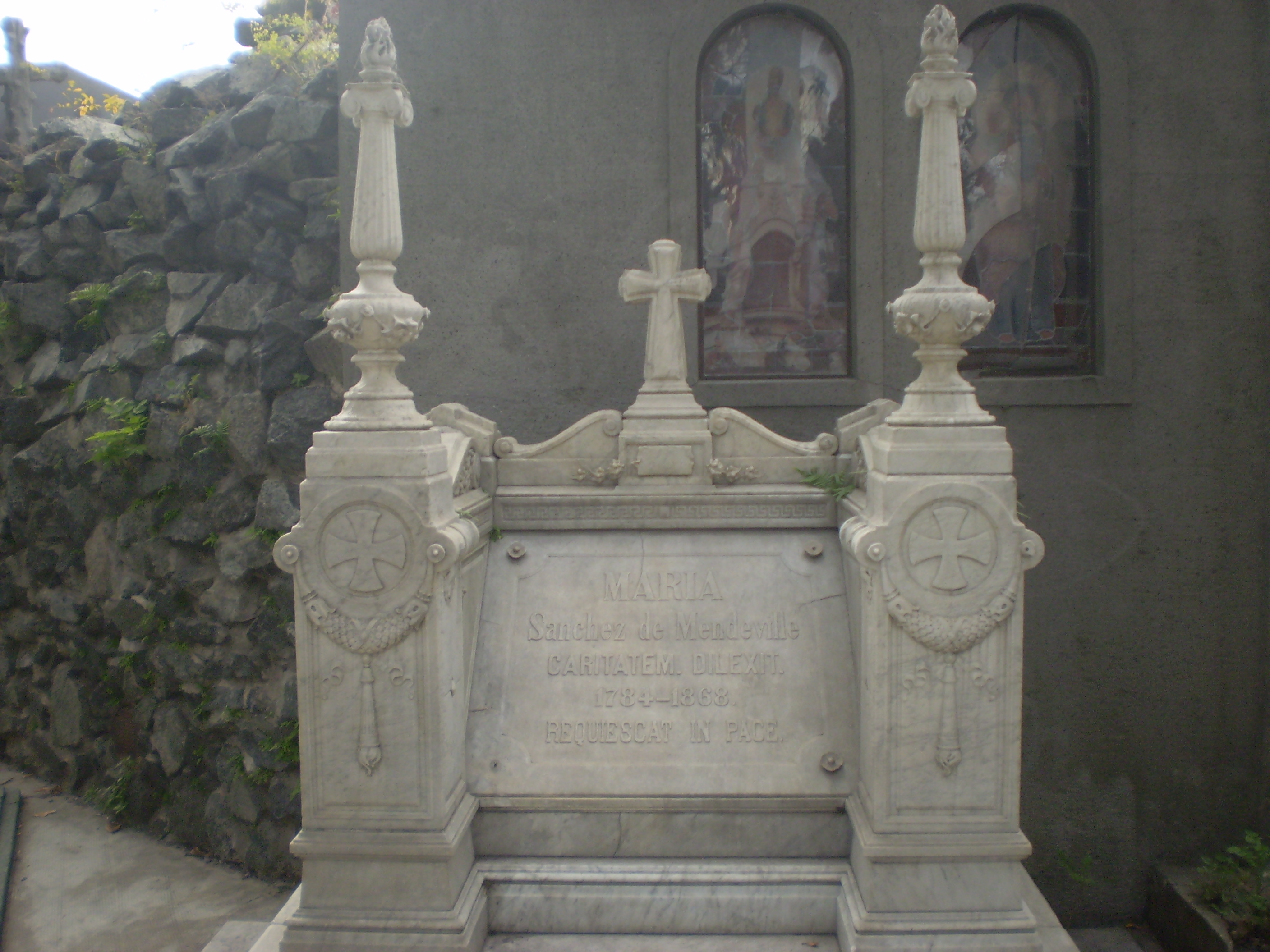
Sánchez de Thompson's resting place at La Recoleta Cemetery

== Tribute ==
On 1 November 2014, Google celebrated her 228th birthday with a Google Doodle.

== Sources ==
- Shumway, Jeffrey M. (2005). The Case of the Ugly Suitor: & Other Histories of Love, Gender, & Nation in Buenos Aires, 1776-1870. U of Nebraska Press. ISBN 978-0-8032-9326-7.
