= Carbuncle (legendary creature) =

Legendary species of small animal in South American folklore

Carbuncle (Spanish: carbunclo, carbunco; Portuguese: carbúnculo) is a legendary species of small animal in South American folklore, specifically in Paraguay or the mining folklore of northern Chile.

The animal is said to have a red shining mirror, like hot glowing coal, on its head, thought to be a precious stone. (Note: Borges & Guerrero (1969), translated by di Giovanni (1969), quoted by Arellano (2014)) The animal was called Añagpitán (emended spelling) in the Guarani language according to Barco Centenera who wrote an early record about pursuing the beast in Paraguay. There are other attestations for anhangapitã from the Tupi-Guranani speaking populations in Brazil.

To the colonial Spaniards and Portuguese, the creature was a realization of the medieval lore that a dragon or wyvern concealed a precious gem in its brain or body (cf. § Early accounts).

== Etymology ==
The English word carbuncle and the Spanish word carbunclo comes from the Latin carbunculus, meaning "little coal" (i.e. carbon). Carbunclo is used to refer to ruby because this gemstone's shine is said to resemble the glow of hot coal. (Note: Montecino Aguirre (2015) citing RAE 1992 (Real Academia Española)) However, it is garnet and not ruby that is said to have been the mineralogical identity of the so-called "carbuncle of the ancients".

In turn, the creature was named after the red gem. It was around the 1600s, Spanish conquistadors (Note: That is to say, del Barco Centenera (1602), the author of which Borges & Guerrero (1969) considers a conquistador, since he calls Oviedo "another conquistador".) began to apply the name to a mysterious small animal they saw in South America.

In Spanish, the forms carbunclo, carbunco are attested, and rarely perhaps carbúnculo also. (Note: The diacritically marked form carbúnculo may be left out, since this seems mostly used as a medical term i.e., "anthrax" or the red tumor resultant in 19th-century publications. The English term "carbuncle" can also refer to anthrax or the red tumor caused by it. Sometimes the accented form denotes the gem.) The term carbunclo/carbunco could also mean "firefly". (Note: Cavada (1914), p. 307 and Cavada (1915))

The creature may sometimes be called farol (meaning "lantern"), though this might be considered a separate creature of the lore of the La Plata area in Argentina.

== Sources ==
Descriptions of the carbuncle came mostly from 17th- to 19th-century Spanish language sources which remained untranslated, but an entry for "carbuncle" appeared in the English translated version of the Book of Imaginary Beings (1969) by Argentine author Jorge Luis Borges, even though the entry on this creature was not included in the original Spanish edition. Some later publication in Spanish, such as El Libro de la Mitología (1997/1998) by Chilean writer Renato Cárdenas.

== Early accounts ==
The chaplain and explorer (Note: A conquistador according to Borges & Guerrero (1969), which calls Oviedo "another conquistador".) Martín del Barco Centenera in La Argentina (1602) called it Anagpitán (recté Añagpitán; cf. anhangapitã below) and described it as "a smallish animal, with a shining mirror on its head, like a glowing coal". (Note: «Y no lejos de aquí, por propios ojos, el carbunclo animal veces he visto. Ninguno me lo juzgue por antojos, que por cazar alguno anduve listo. Mil penas padecí, y mil enojos, en seguimiento de él, ¡mas cuán bien quisto y rico y venturoso se hallara aquel que Anagpitán vivo cazara! Un animalejo es, algo pequeño, con espejo en la frente reluciente como la brasa ignita en recio leño, corre y salta veloz y diligente. Así como le hirieren echa el ceño y entúrbiase el espejo de repente, pues para que el carbunclo de algo preste en vida el espejuelo sacan de éste. ¡Cuán triste se halló, y cuán penoso Rui Díaz Melgarejo! Que hallado había, a mí me dijo, de uno hermoso; perdiolo por habérsele volcado una canoa en que iba muy gozoso. Yo le vi lamentar su suerte y hado diciendo: «si el carbunclo no perdiera, con él al Gran Philipo yo sirviera». — Martín del Barco Centenera, Canto III, La Argentina) As explained in the Book of Imaginary Beings, this explorer Barco Centenera "underwent many hardships hunting the reaches of Paraguayan rivers and jungles for the elusive creature; he never found it". Barco Centenera had explained in marginal notes that the beast carbunculo was called anagpitan in Guarani approximately meaning "the devil that shines like fire".

The mirror in the carbuncle's head was likened to two lights observed by Spanish explorers in the Strait of Magellan by another conquistador Gonzalo Fernández de Oviedo y Valdés, who also commented that the gem piece was reminiscent of the legend of the gemstone supposedly hidden in the brains of a dragon. Oviedo probably had read from the dragon lore given by Isidore of Seville in the 7th-century Etymologiae.

=== 18th century ===
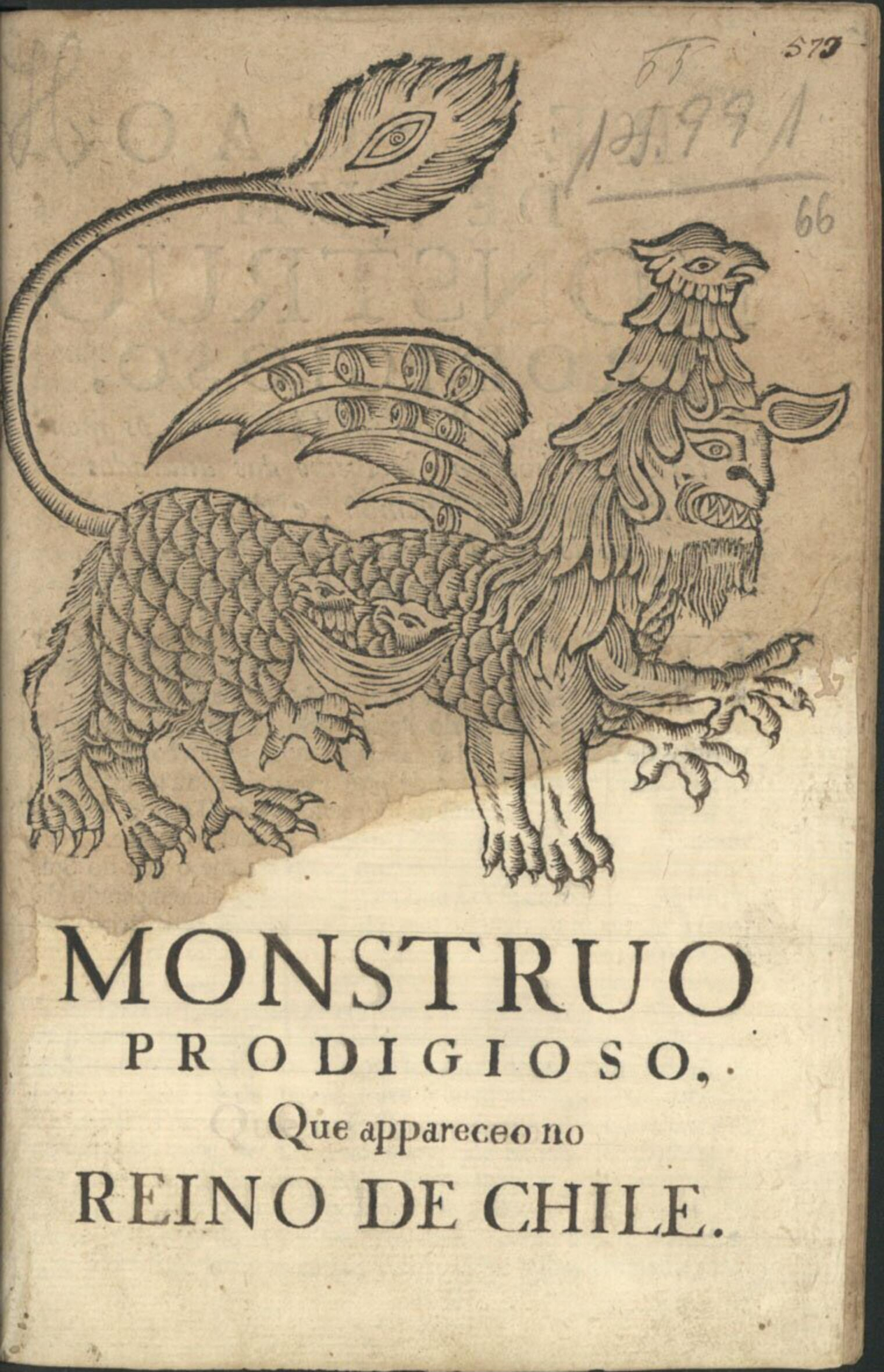
Cover of Monstruo Prodigioso que apareceu no reino do Chile (1751), a book which mentions the carbuncle

In an account of the prodigious monster that appeared in the mountains of the Kingdom of Chile (Monstruo Prodigioso que apareceu no reino do Chile, published 1751), a group of men follow a moving source of light, which would dim and shine. One of the men explained his belief that "this light must come from some carbuncle [stone], often said to be the most precious stone in the world; [the stone] shone at night [lodged] on the head of a certain species of dragon, which was rarely caught, because it only grazed[?] at night by the light of that brilliant stone.. and when it sensed any noise, it covered the said stone with a membrane, which they had for that purpose, making everything dark.." The village seniors, who dubbed the beast the "Bruto" ("brute") then discussed its capture in a trapping pit. (Note: Costa (1751), p. 12, quoted by Ramos (2005), p. 352)

While it is not clear to what extent this beast corresponds to a carbuncle monster, modern study regarding this monster makes comparisons to the Latin American carbuncle monster and the medieval lore that a vouivre (guivre≈wyvern) holds a carbuncle gem on its head. (Note: Ramos (2005), p. 357, quoting Izzi (1996), p. 94 on "basilisco"[?])

Friar Feijóo's Teatro crítico universal (1726–1739) writes on the current myth about a supposed creature with a "carbuncle" on its head, better called a "Astro Elemental" since it purports to be worth ten times as much as diamond. He believes travelers to the East invented or imported such fable that a King of Persia here or an Emperor of China there owned such a gem, but these were fabulous, and the gem was really only a (mined) ruby. He also read Louis Moréri's encyclopedia entry under Dolomieu village that in 1680 a flying dragon had been slain which carried a carbuncle on its forehead. Feijóo considered this a concocted old wives' tale or fable, but knows of a painting depicting the dragon of Dolomieu as cat-headed, and wonders if this might be the origin of the rumor, which he heard many times, of the animal with the carbuncle on its forehead bearing the shape of a cat.

== General description ==
The description of the animal vary; and "no one ever saw it well enough to know whether it was a bird or a mammal, whether is had feathers or fur". (Note: The legendary shiny winged bird, the alicanto, which leads ones to a cache of treasure, may be commingled or conflated with the carbuncle. And in the 1751 text, the creature was thought to be a flying dragon.) In Chile some say it moves like a firefly in the night.

In Latin American lore, it is said to hold treasures inside so whoever manages to capture it will become wealthy. An alleged specimen seen in Ovalle on the Tulahuén hill in Coquimbo Region, Chile shone bright from the jewel and gold inside it. (Note: Montecino Aguirre (2015) citing Ponce Castillo (2001).) Or else, such gemlike gleam is supposed to be a guiding beacon to naturally occurring treasures. (Note: Coluccio (1966), and later Montecino Aguirre (2015) citing Coluccio (1999).) In Catamarca Province, Argentina, the carbunclo is considered an imaginary animal that emits a much light from its head, while many believed the light source to be a carbuncle (gem).

In Tarapacá, it is said to look like a bivalve (Note: The phrase "bivalve (bivalvo)", which indicates a mollusc, was not explicitly used originally by Vicuña Cifuentes (1915). See quote below.) with a strong white-blue shine from within the shell which can be observed from a distance 1 league away; this "bivalve" has an acute sense of hearing, so that it can quickly detect humans approaching, and clam up inside its hard shell, and be mistaken for a stone. (Note: Vicuña Cifuentes (1915): "This animal is described as being made up of two shells or valves, which can open and close, with the glow or fire in the hidden central part. The light is very bright, blue-white and visible for more than a league este animal como compuesto de dos conchas o valvas, que puede abrir y cerrar, teniendo el brillo o fuego en la parte central oculta, etc.".) (Note: Montecino Aguirre (2015) citing Plath (1973) and Ugalde (1993)) According to some, it is shaped like a corncob (Note: Spanish: choclo, hence "corncob", though possibly better rendered as corn on the cob or maize ear) but is articulated or jointed, and according to a witness who tracked it, it had bluish white light leaking from the joints, and had more than four limbs. (Note: The witness named as Eulogio Rojas, in the year 1879.)

It was a creature larger than a mouse but equipped with a hard shell, as crudely described by a certain laborer who was in too much of a hurry to kill it and seize the gold and riches from the shell before attracting the greedy notice of others. It is commented that the man got rich but science suffered the knowledge lost. (Note: Allegedly caught by Gaspar Huerta, making a canal in Las Tunas in Quile (i.e., in Coquimbo Province) The location is south of La Serena, Chile according to Montecino Aguirre (2015), who (citing Vicuña (1947)) writes as if the man forgot everything, but even though the man did not notice the fine details and disposed of the carcass quickly to escape notice, and quoted as saying «era más grandecito que un ratón y que tenía concha» in Vicuña Cifuentes (1915) (after Silvestre (1904)))

During the great drought of 1924–25 there were reported sightings of carbunclos on moonless nights. Around 1925 a family of carbunclos was seen descending from the mountain of Tulahuén towards Río Grande (Coquimbo Region).

== Chilote mythology ==
In the Chilote mythology of southern Chile the carbunclo is said to be the "guardian of the metals". Descriptions of it vary, from a luminescent small dog, a luminescent bivalve, a cat with a luminescent lock or tuft under its beard (Note: Cavada (1914): "de la barba un mechón luminoso", "en la barbilla un mechón luminoso") or a greenish-red fiery light reminiscent of fireflies. Varitation in color has been explained as the creature's property of taking on the color of the metal or treasure it is guarding. Whoever becomes owner of the luminous beard is said to become free from poverty.

The carbunclo is said to manifest itself at night around the Southern Hemisphere winter solstice (late June).

Legend prescribes a certain method which needs to be followed in order to retrieve the carbunclo's treasure: First, a length of string, or a belt (or some personal belonging) (Note: Winkler calling it a "lasso" appears to be embellishment.) must be cast towards the carbunclo which will snatch it and disappear. The treasure seeker shall wait and return to the site in the morning before dawn, and search for signs of the thrown object, as the tail end of it should be sticking out of the ground to mark the buried treasure, and the spot will usually be the foot of a spiny calafate (Berberis microphylla, Magellan barberry) shrub. (Note: There is a calafate plant of legend, with an origin myth told about it.) The treasure seeker must wait again, until midnight, to dig it up in a certain prescribed way: with a new shovel in hand and in the company of an old widow holding a black cat. When he has dug a vara (Spanish yard) deep, he must throw the black cat into the hole, which will vanish, but soon reappear in the woman's hands, and for each fresh yard dug, the cat must be tossed in again. If this ritual is not performed, the digger will die in the pit due to noxious gas. He must also not show any sign of fear the treasure will turn into rock.

== Brazilian or Guarani mythology ==
In the state Rio Grande do Sul of Brazil, the lore of the carbúnculo as a fabulous animal and provender of riches (Note: propiciador de riquezas) had formed around the time of conquest, and was spread through missionaries. Conflation with this tradition may have created the mythical lizard known in the Guarani languages as the teiniaguá (Note: Spelling forms: teiuiaguá, teiniaguá, Or teiú-yaguá, also "teyuyaguae[s]" by Granada.), though others only concede vaguely that there was some sort of Christian influence on the lore of the teiniaguá in Tupi-Guarani mythology.

The notion that the "red devil" (Portuguese: anhangapitã, Spanish: añangapitanga (Note: Translated meaning in Portuguese: "Diabo Vermelho", from Guarani: anhangá 'spirit, devil' + pinta 'red')), the Andean carbunco (Portuguese: carbúnculo) and the teiniaguá of the missionaries are the same creature by different names was held by Spanish philologist Daniel Granada, but his insistence on equating the three has faced criticism. A connection between the carbúnculo and the mythical Tupi-Guarani serpent mboitatá has also been proposed by Granada and Carlos Teschauer, but refuted by Câmara Cascudo who didn't think the serpent was connected with gold (thus pointing out that there was no valid common motif relating to "hidden treasure"). In addition, Granada or Teschauer had thought the golden lizard (lagarto-de-ouro) from the Mãe-do-Ouro cycle could be connected to the carbunco.

== Algerian attestation ==
According to a letter from Oran, Algeria dated 29 August 1736, a Spanish soldier (Note: Infantryman named Andres de Ribas, from Ardales, Andalusia.) who was stationed there at the fort (of Castillo de San Gregorio) claimed to have caught a carbuncle (carbunclo, annotated as what the Greeks call "Pyropos") with a shining gem lodged in its forehead. It was initially witnessed nightly by a number of men around 12 midnight, a short distance away from this fort, as a dazzling glow at Cubo de San Roque (apparently a hole or cave). The soldier came off duty one midnight and encountered the dazzling creature emerging from the said cave. It was a "small animal like a weasel (comadreja), with dark brown fur that was very soft and smooth, a short tail a little less bushier than a squirrel's, its front or back paws and body like a weasel, its head long, its eyes large and beautiful, and between them, in the middle of the forehead, a singular Stone like a hazelnut in the shape of a diamond point, which is covered with a little cap, or hood of skin". This cap had to be peeled back forcibly in order to see the stone while it was alive. It wouldn't take food so it was slaughtered and skinned after two days. (Note: Published in Gazeta de Mexico Num. 118, Sept. 1737, reprinted in León (1903).)

== Rational explanations ==
According to some, the carbuncle is explainable as a bivalve mollusk which glows because of bioluminescence from the "cauquil" (Noctiluca scintillans) or from fireflies.

== In games ==
Carbuncle is a recurring character in the Final Fantasy series of role-playing games, and "appears as a small creature, fox-, cat-, rabbit- or squirrel-like, with green or blue fur, depending on the game". It often appears as an ally that can be summoned by magic, providing protection against magical attacks. Occasionally, it acts as a vital component of the plot, along with its fellow summons.

The Advanced Dungeons & Dragons monster manual Fiend Folio describes the carbuncle as an armadillo-like creature with a removable ruby on its forehead (illustrated by Albie Fiore).

It also appeared in the game Madō Monogatari and Puyo Puyo, the latter having reused many of the monster characters from the former. Carbuncles also appear as a common enemy in the game Reverse: 1999, depicted as black cat-like critters who love dust.

The Pokémon Carbink and Diancie are inspired by the Carbuncle.

== See also ==
- Alicanto – Bird from Chilean mythology, associated with mineral deposits
- Boitatá - A serpent monster cum will-o'-the-wisp
- ryū no agito no tama wo toru (竜の頷の珠を取る; lit. 'taking the jewel from the dragon's jaw/chin') - set phrase, whose sinetic analogue is riryō ganka no tama (驪竜頷下の珠; lit. 'jewel below the jaw/chin of the lilong dragon')
- uktena - serpent of the Cherokee, with a diamond on forehead.
