= United Provinces of the Río de la Plata =

South American provinces (1810–1831)

Coordinates: 34.6667°S 58.4000°W

United Provinces in South America Provincias Unidas en Sud-América
- 1810–1831
- Flag (1818–1836) Coat of arms
- Motto: En unión y libertad (English: "In Union and Freedom")
- Anthem: Marcha patriótica (English: "Patriotic March")
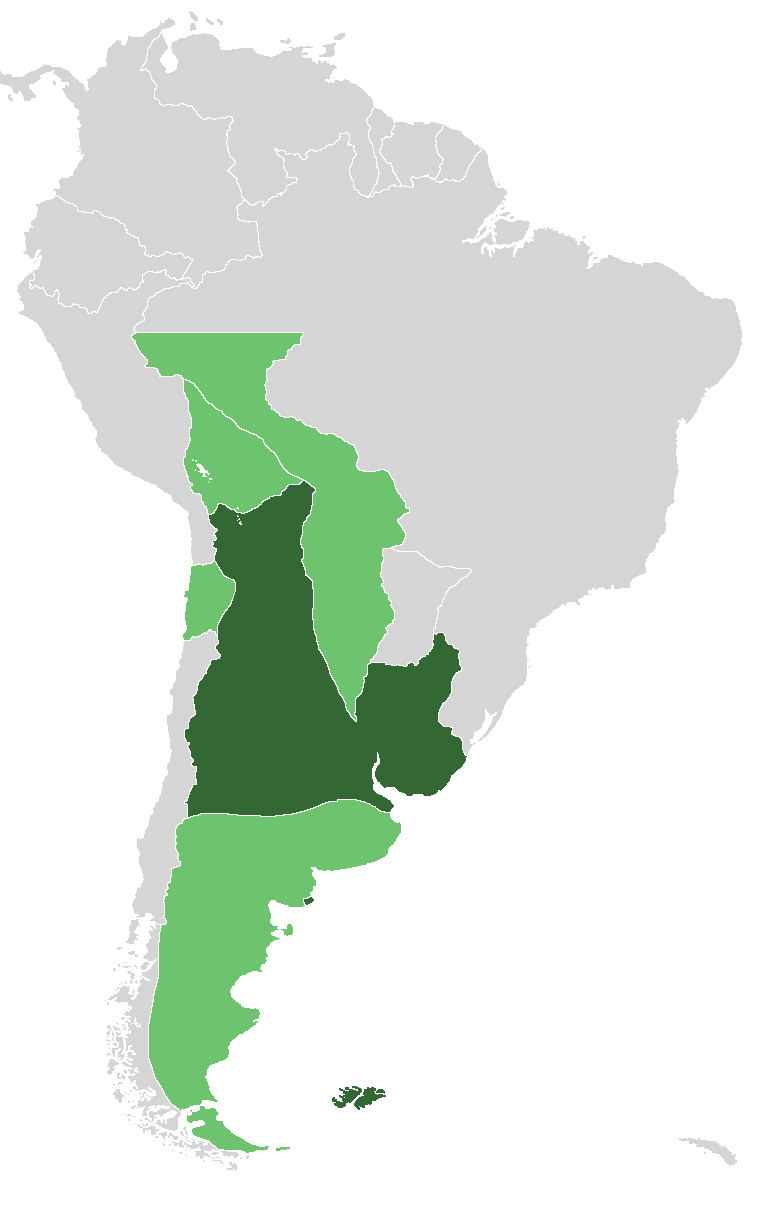
- Territory ever controlled Territory claimed but never controlled
- Status: Spanish provinces (1810-1816); Sovereign state (1816-1831)
- Capital: Buenos Aires
- Common languages: Spanish; Indigenous languages
- Religion: Catholicism
- Government: 1810–1811: Government junta; 1811–1814: Triumvirate; 1814–1820: Directorial republic; 1820–1826: (Note: Between 1820 and 1826, the United Provinces functioned as a loose alliance of autonomous provinces put together by pacts and treaties (see Treaty of Pilar, Treaty of Benegas, and Quadrilateral Treaty), but lacking any actual central government until the 1825 Constitutional Congress.) Confederation (de facto); 1826–1827: Unitary presidential republic; 1827–1831: Confederation (de facto)
- Monarch (de jure)
  - 1810–1816: Ferdinand VII
- History
  - British invasions: 1806–1807
  - May Revolution: 25 May 1810
  - Independence: 9 July 1816
  - Battle of Cepeda: 1 February 1820
  - First Presidency: 1826–1827
  - Montevideo Treaty: 28 August 1828
  - Federal Pact: 4 January 1831

Population
  - 1816: 507,951
  - 1825: 570,000
- Currency: Real (1813–1815); Sol (1815–1826); Peso fuerte (1826–1881)
Preceded by
| Viceroyalty of the Río de la Plata |
Succeeded by
| 1831: Argentine Confederation |
| 1828: Uruguay |
| 1825: Upper Peru |
| 1815: Federal League |

The United Provinces of the Río de la Plata or United Provinces of the River Plate, (Note: Spanish: Provincias Unidas del Río de la Plata) along with United Provinces in South America, (Note: Spanish: Provincias Unidas en Sud-América) are names used to refer to the emerging state that succeeded the Viceroyalty of the Río de la Plata after the May Revolution, from 1810 to 1831, encompassing the Argentine War of Independence, the Cisplatine War and the beginning of the Argentine Civil Wars. The aforementioned state is now the Argentine Republic. The name "United Provinces of the Río de la Plata" is recognised as one of the official names of Argentina according to its constitution.

== Nomenclature ==
The state that succeeded the Viceroyalty of the Río de la Plata in 1810 used different names depending on political interests and people's common usage.

- Provinces of the Río de la Plata (Spanish: Provincias del Río de la Plata): Following the removal of the Viceroy from office and his replacement by a government junta, it was no longer appropiate to keep referring to the state a viceroyalty. Therefore, in a public edict written on the night of 25 May 1810 by the Primera Junta and proclaimed the next day, the name Provinces of the Río de la Plata made its first appearance.
- United Provinces of the Río de la Plata (Spanish: Provincias Unidas del Río de la Plata): This name was officially adopted by the First Triumvirate on 22 November 1811, in the 1811 Provisional Statute. It became the most common name during the War of Independence and is recognised as an alternative name of the state according to Article 35 of the Constitution of Argentina, although it is not used in practice.
- United Provinces of the South (Spanish: Provincias Unidas del Sud): This was the name used to refer to the state in the Argentine National Anthem ("Marcha patriótica"), composed in 1813. It was not used in official documents.
- United Provinces in South America (Spanish: Provincias Unidas en Sud-América): This name appears in the Argentine Declaration of Independence of 1816. It was probably chosen because it was a more encompassing name, and the borders of the new state were not clear yet. The name was also used in the Argentine Constitution of 1819.
- United Provinces of South America (Spanish: Provincias Unidas de Sud-América): The use "of" of instead of "in" can be seen in the letter of marque from 1817.
- Republic of the United Provinces of the Río de la Plata (Spanish: República de las Provincias Unidas del Río de la Plata): This official name was used in a document written by Buenos Aires Governor Juan Gregorio de las Heras in response to the Empire of Brazil, which had declared war on the United Provinces due to the annexation of the Oriental Province. It was adopted to emphasise republicanism in contrast to Brazil, which was a monarchy.
- Argentina: The name comes from argentinus, which means "related to silver" (argentum) in Latin. It first appeared in 1602 in the poem La Argentina written by Martín del Barco Centenera, for referring to the Río de la Plata, which literally translates into English as "River of Silver". It gained popularity during the 1820s following the drafting and approval of the 1826 constitution, although United Provinces of the Río de la Plata continued to be the most common name for the State. After the 1831 Federal Pact, the name Argentina as part of Argentine Confederation gained widespread acceptance.
- Argentine Republic (Spanish: República Argentina): This name was officially adopted by the 1826 constitution. However, in 1827, fell into disuse. Currenty, it is the most common official name used by Argentina.
- Argentine Federation (Spanish: Federación Argentina): The name appeared in the certificates of military discharge from Buenos Aires during Rosas' administration of the province.
- Argentine Confederation (Spanish: Confederación Argentina): This name became a widely used after the Federal Pact, although had been used previously. It is also one of Argentina’s official names according to Article 35 of its constitution.

Río de la Plata can be translated as River Plate. This translation originated when plate could mean silver in English. One of Argentina's two largest football clubs is named after this translation (Club Atlético River Plate). A more accurate English version of Río de la Plata would be "River of Silver", but it is not used. Also, the Río de la Plata is not a river, but an estuary.

== Territory ==
The United Provinces of the Río de la Plata were bordered on the south by the sparsely populated territories of the Pampas and Patagonia, home to the Mapuche, Ranquel, and Puelche peoples. To the north, the Gran Chaco was populated by the Guaycuru nations. To the northwest, across Upper Peru (present-day Bolivia), lay the Spanish Viceroyalty of Peru. Across the Andes, to the west, was the Spanish-controlled Captaincy General of Chile. To the northeast was Colonial Brazil, part of the Portuguese Empire (in 1815, the United Kingdom of Portugal, Brazil and the Algarves), later the Empire of Brazil in 1822.

However, the territory of the United Provinces changed repeatedly. Since the beginning, the government of Buenos Aires (the juntas, the triumvirates and later the Directory) wanted to control all the intendancies that belonged to the Viceroyalty of the Río de la Plata. Nevertheless, this goal was never achieved due to resistance by royalist governments. The Intendancy of Paraguay (modern-day Paraguay) rejected Buenos Aires’ authority and swore loyalty to the provisional government of Peninsular Spain (the Council of Regency of Spain and the Indies). Buenos Aires launched a military expedition known as the Paraguay campaign, but it was defeated and Paraguay became an independent country a few months later. The intendancies of La Paz, Chuquisaca, Cochabamba, Córdoba del Tucumán, Salta del Tucumán and the political and military governments of Moxos and Chiquitos were annexed by the Viceroyalty of Peru after the May Revolution; Córdoba del Tucumán and Salta del Tucumán were fully regained after the Second Upper Peru campaign, commanded by Manuel Belgrano, but the other territories (known as a whole as Upper Peru) were never retaken, and became Bolivia years later.

Montevideo did not acknowledge Buenos Aires’ government either, and was declared the new capital of the Viceroyalty of the Río de la Plata, where that administrative division continued to exist until 1814, when the city was conquered by the United Provinces. However, Montevideo became part of the Oriental Province (the Eastern Bank and Montevideo, modern-day Uruguay) and acted as the capital of the League of the Free Peoples, a federal alternative to the United Provinces of the Río de la Plata, which had a unitary government. This alternative state was composed of the provinces of Córdoba, Corrientes, Entre Ríos, Santa Fe, Misiones and the Eastern Bank. In 1820, the Eastern Bank was fully captured by Portuguese Brazil, and the League was abolished; the rest of its provinces came under Argentine control. The Eastern Bank became an independent state (Uruguay) in 1828 after British intervention in the Cisplatine War.

== History ==
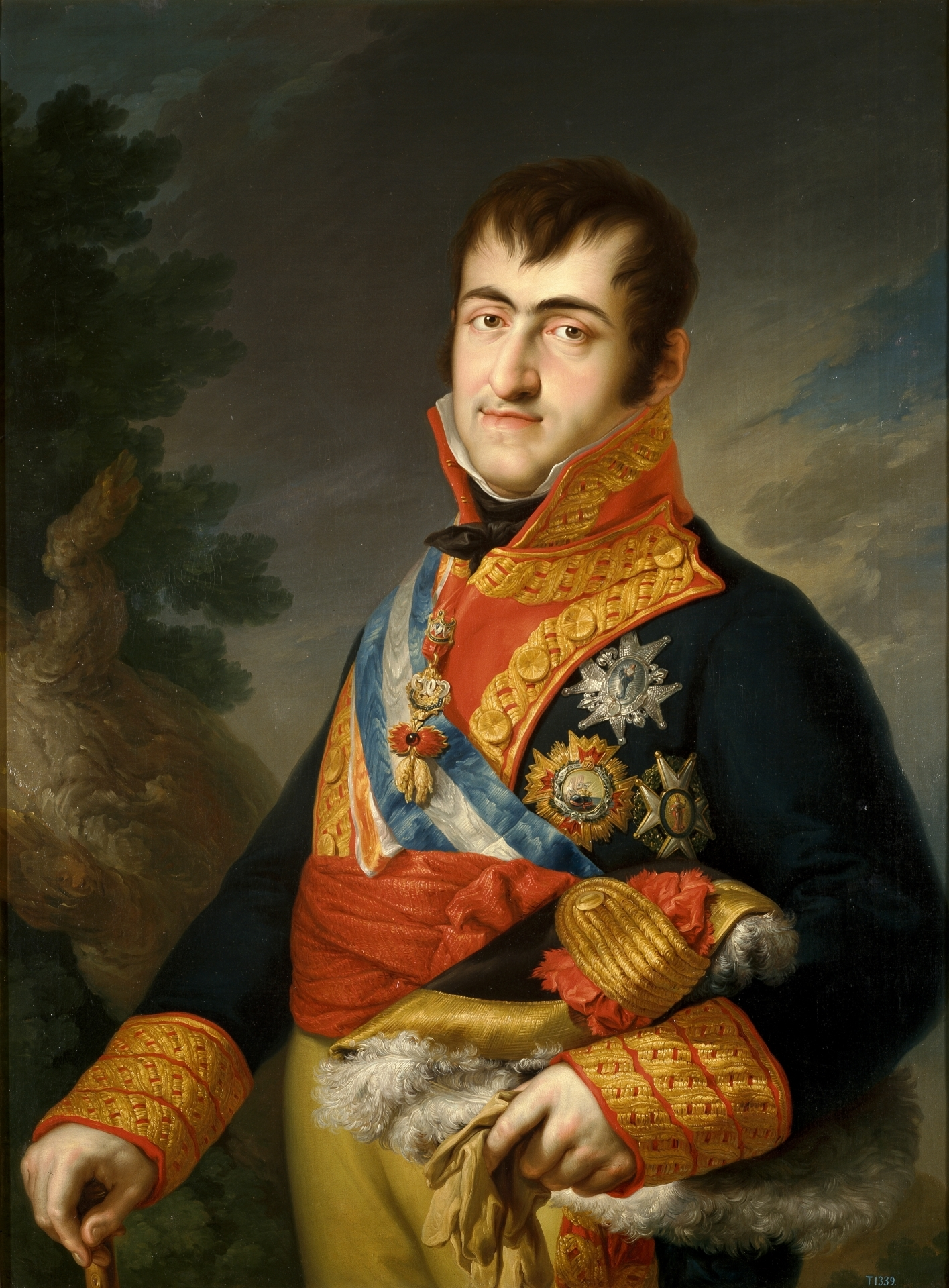
Ferdinand VII, de jure king of Spain in 1810

According to historians, the beginning of the state occurred during the May Revolution, often cited on 24 or 25 May 1810, when the viceroy of the Río de la Plata, Baltasar Hidalgo de Cisneros, was dismissed by an Open Cabildo. The reason behind this decision was a very complex political context originating after the capture of King Ferdinand VII of Spain by Napoleon: the people of the Iberian Peninsula had organised a provisional government known as the Supreme Central Junta, which had been acknowledged by Spanish America, and had appointed Cisneros as viceroy. However, this junta was dissolved by French forces, so the Viceroy legitimacy was weakened, as he had been elected not by the King, but by a spontaneous junta that no longer existed.

The criollos, people with Iberian Spanish ancestry born in the Americas, were legally considered Spanish, but in practice were excluded from important government offices. Many of them were influenced by enlightenment, popular sovereignty and liberal ideas, and wanted to change their situation and society. Furthermore, Spanish America had a history of indigenous and criollo rebellions, such as the Rebellion of Tupac Amaru II and the Revolutions of La Paz and Chuquisaca. Therefore, when the Iberian provisional government fell, the criollos, along with some Peninsular liberals, demanded the dismissal of Cisneros and the creation of a government junta, sustained by the principle of retroversion of sovereignty to the people, which stated that, in absence of a legitimate sovereign, such as the King, sovereignty had to return to the people, who thus had to choose how to govern themselves. They were supported by Buenos Aires' urban militias such as the Regiment of Patricians, commanded by Cornelio Saavedra. Nevertheless, other criollos opposed the Revolution, especially those who benefited from the Spanish commercial monopoly and the bureaucratic elite.

The Primera Junta—the government created by the May Revolution—swore loyalty to Ferdinand VII and did not declare independence, but refused to recognise the authority of the Council of Regency of Spain and the Indies—which was the new provisional government in the Iberian Peninsula—since it had not been chosen by Spanish American citizens and was significantly more conservative. This created a huge debate among historians, related to whether the revolutionaries actually wanted to declare independence from Spain from the beginning. This debate is divided into two stances. First, there those who think that the initial discretion was a strategy of the revolutionaries—often called Mask of Ferdinand VII—while they were waiting for a better international context. On the other hand, other historians say that 1810 was the best context for the revolutionaries to declare independence, but they did not do it since it was not the initial goal, and became the only option when Ferdinand VII returned to the throne and became extremely conservative.

=== Political context ===
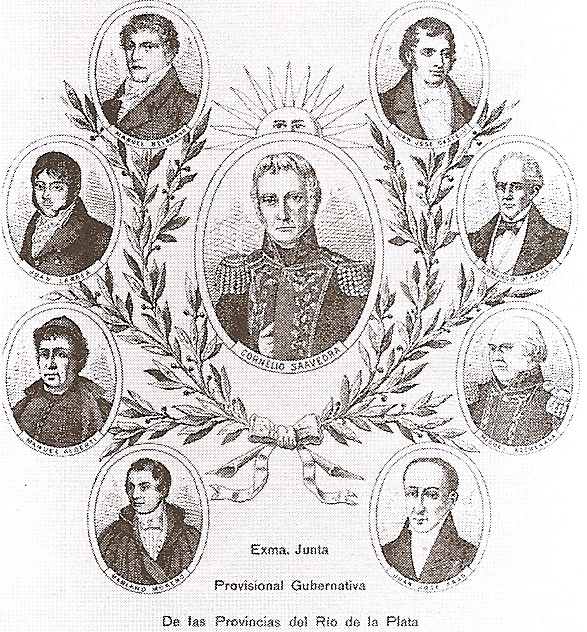
Members of the Primera Junta

After the May Revolution, there were two main political groups in the Provinces. The first one was composed of those who wanted to preserve the Old Regime, such as the ecclesiastical elite, bureaucrats related to the viceregnal administration and rich merchants who benefited from the Spanish commercial monopoly. They were entrenched in the Royal Audiencia and the Cabildo of Buenos Aires. On the other hand, the second group (the revolutionaries) encompassed a petty bourgeoisie and a new merchant bourgeoisie. The former was composed of lawyers (Moreno, Castelli, Belgrano and Paso), popular priests (Alberti, José Ignacio Grela and Juan Manuel Aparicio), common workers (Domingo French, Antonio Beruti, Agustín José Donado, Buenaventura de Arzac, Francisco Mariano de Orma, etc.) and doctors (Cosme Argerich), primarily influenced by Enlightenment and popular sovereignty ideas. Meanwhile, the revolutionary merchant bourgeoisie was engaged in trade with other countries; this was considered smuggling, but they activity was legalised in 1809 within a framework of economic crisis due to the downfall of Spain. It was composed of criollo families (Riglos, Aguirre, Sarratea, Escalada, García, Rivadavia, etc.) and British ones (Miller, Parish, Bellinghurst, O'Gorman, Wilde, Craig, Dillon, Twaites, Gowland, Lynch, Robertson, Mackinson, Brittain, Armstrong, Ramsay, etc.). The interests of the idealist revolutinaries would sometimes coincide with or differ from those of British and criollos merchants.

=== Primera Junta ===
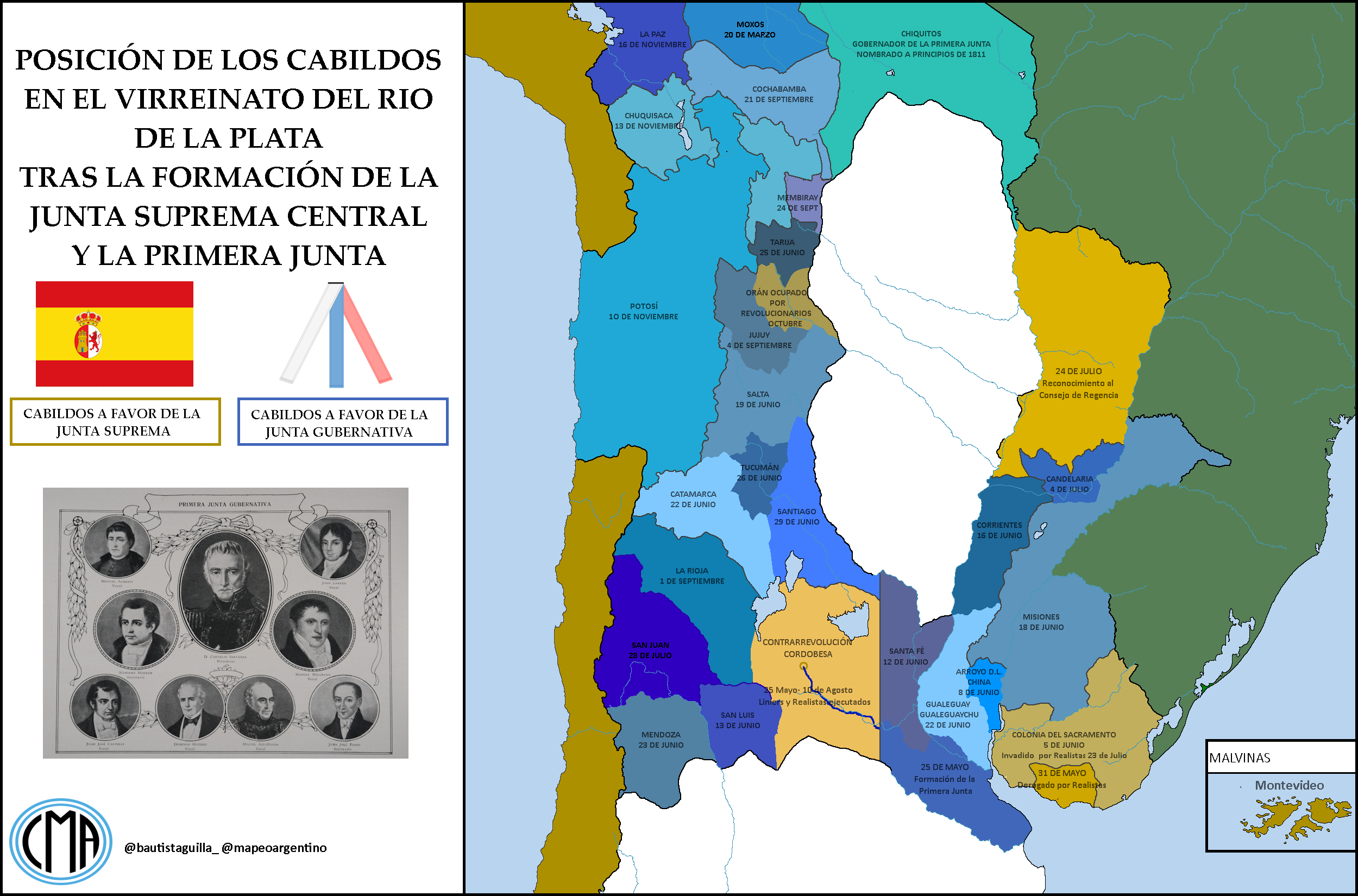
Council of Regency vs. Primera Junta recognition among provinces of the former Viceroyalty of the Río de la Plata

The Primera Junta, founded on 25 May 1810, was a government junta similar to the ones from the Iberian Peninsula. It was composed of Cornelio Saavedra as chairman, Manuel Belgrano, Juan José Castelli, Manuel Alberti, Miguel de Azcuénaga, Juan Larrea and Domingo Matheu as voting members, and Mariano Moreno and Juan José Paso as secretaries. However, one of the debated issues in creating an spontaneous junta in Buenos Aires was the lack of representation of the other provinces, so one of the first measures of the Primera Junta was to send a circular to each city of the former Viceroyalty announcing its creation and requesting them to send deputies.

As the news spread, the Primera Junta started to work as the new government immediately. Although Saavedra was the chairman, the Junta’s political measures were heavily influenced by Moreno and his friends, such as Belgrano and Castelli (known as a whole as Morenism). They were considered to be extremists by their political opponents, since they were inspired by the French Revolution. Moreno was despectively qualified as Jacobin. On the other hand, Saavedra and his followers (Saavedrism) had more moderate ideas. There is a document called Operations Plan which is attributed to Moreno and contains a list of policies "in order for the provisional government to win the war against absolutism". Some authors, such as Diego Bauso, claim that the Plan is apocryphal, and contains text from the Spanish translation of a French novel called The Cemetery of Magdalena. Other historians, such as Norberto Galasso, defend that it is an authentic document that correlates with the Junta’s measures under Moreno’s influence.

Regarding the economy, the Primera Junta established a fund to promote the mining industry, redistributed land in the Pampas, and imposed limits to prevent the concentration of large estates. It maintained tariffs on imported goods despite pressure from British merchants and launched an enterprise to manufacture rifles in Buenos Aires and Tucumán, as well as another to produce gunpowder in Córdoba. Nevertheless, there was not enough time for Moreno’s policies to take effect, and some of them, such as the maintenance of tariffs on imported goods, put him at odds with one of the social classes that supported the revolution (the criollo and British merchants). This strengthened support for Saavedrism as an alternative to Morenism.

In the political sphere, as mentioned earlier, the Junta declared its loyalty to Ferdinand VII—the Spanish king imprisioned by Napoleon—and opposed the French invasion of the Iberian Peninsula, thus rejecting the puppet government of Spain led by Napoleon's brother, Joseph Bonaparte. However, it did not recognise the authority of the Council of Regency of Spain and the Indies either, which was the provisional government formed in the Peninsula by Spanish citizens, in opposition to the French authority. The Junta argued that, since no Spanish American had participated in the foundation of the Council, such a body could only exercise authority over the Peninsula, but not over the Americas. In practice, this rejection had further political motivations, such as the more conservative stances adopted by many members of the Council of Regency, which were against the liberal views of the South American revolutionaries. The Cabildo of Buenos Aires secretly swore loyalty to the Council of Regency on 14 July 1810. The Juntra found out months later, and on 17 October 1810, it replaced the members of the Cabildo with British and criollo merchants and lawyers who were more supportive of the Revolution.

When the cities of the other provinces (intendancies) and political-military governments received the news about the dismissal of Cisneros, some of them acknowledged the authority of the new government, while others refused to do so. There was a counterrevolution in Córdoba led by former viceroy of the Río de la Plata Santiago de Liniers, but it was suppressed and he was executed. On the other hand, the Viceroyalty of Peru, which had aligned itself with the Council of Regency, considered the new government of Buenos Aires to be illegitimate and annexed the intendancies and governments of Upper Peru "until his Excellency the Viceroy of Buenos Aires be restored to its legitimate authority". Both the Intendancy of Paraguay and the Political and Military Government of Montevideo swore loyalty to the Council of Regency as well, and therefore did not recognise the authority of the Junta. For this reason, Buenos Aires launched military campaigns to Paraguay, Upper Peru and the Eastern Bank. This is considered to be the beginning of the Argentine War of Independence, although such independence had not yet been declared.

Eventually, the deputies from the provinces arrived in Buenos Aires to join the Junta. Moreno did not want to admit them, arguing that it would slow down the government and that they should participate in a General Congress to decide the permanent organisation of the State instead. On 18 December 1810, the deputies were accepted after a vote, marking the beginning of the Junta Grande. Moreno submitted his resignation, but it was rejected. Instead, he was sent on a diplomatic mission to the United Kingdom and died in International Waters under strange circumstances.

=== Junta Grande ===
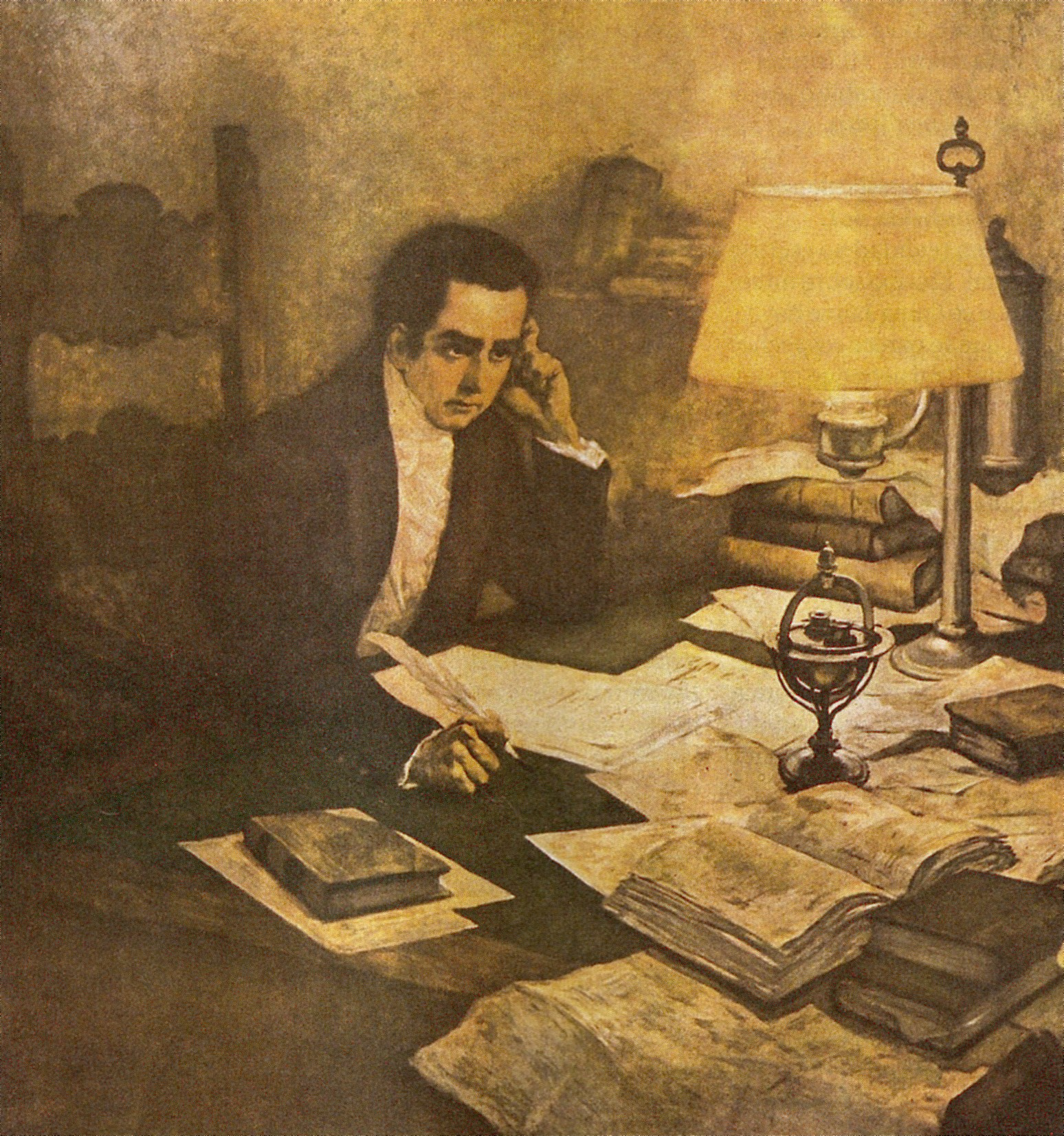
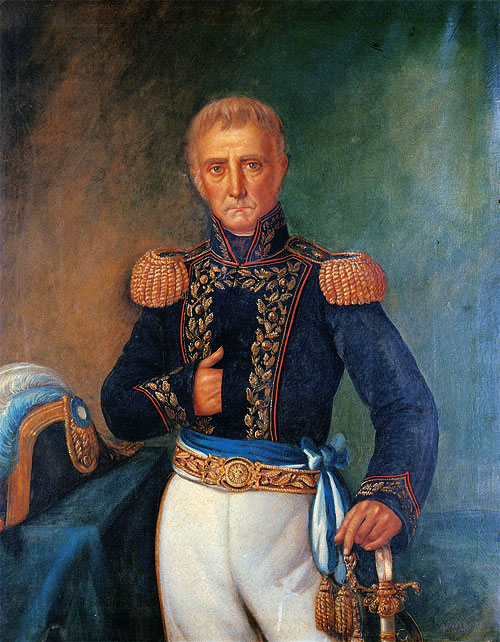
Moreno and Saavedra, prominent political figures between 1810 and 1811

The Junta Grande was formed by incorporating the deputies that had come from the cities into the already existing junta. Morenism lost its majority and became a minor political force within the government, while Saavedrism rose to prominence with a more moderate political agenda. The military fronts opened during the Primera Junta's administration (Paraguay, Upper Peru and the East) were resulting in significant military defeats for the Junta Grande. Firstly, the Intendancy of Paraguay successfully repelled the campaign launched from Buenos Aires. The Saavedrists would later demand General Belgrano to be tried, within the framework of the political dispute between Saavedrists and Morenists. To the East, the Junta's first naval squadron, which was intended to assist the army in Paraguay, was destroyed in the Battle of San Nicolás, against the government of Montevideo. Later, on 20 June 1811, the First Upper Peru campaign would be sealed as a failure after the defeat of the Junta's army in the Battle—also known as the Disaster—of Huaqui.

On 5 and 6 April 1811, the Saavedrist party positioned people across the Plaza de la Victoria (present-day Plaza de Mayo), right in front of the Fort of Buenos Aires (where the Casa Rosada is now located), to demand the dismissal of the last Morenist members of the Junta. Larrea, Azcuénaga, Hipólito Vieytes and Nicolás Rodríguez Peña were expelled from the government, consolidating Saavedrist control over the Junta’s politics. Many Morenists were exiled: Azcuénaga and Gervasio Antonio de Posadas to Mendoza, Larrea to San Juan, Rodríguez Peña to San Luis, and French, Beruti and Vieytes to Patagonia. It is debated among historians whether this revolution was a popular movement or not.

Aside from the Junta's military actions, the Eastern Bank began its own revolutionary process. On 28 February 1811, the Cry of Asencio took place, marking the beginning of the Oriental Revolution, whose main figure was José Gervasio Artigas. This revolutionary movement had a strong popular participation, as it included gauchos, indigenous and black people, workers and even landowers at the beginning. On the other hand, the May Revolution occasionally appealed to the people, as during the foundation of the Primera Junta, but the revolutionary process was primarily carried out by its governments and politicians—this difference made Artigas an important figure and leader. After the victory in the Battle of Las Piedras, he led the establishment of the First Siege of Montevideo, since the city government did not want to surrender.

Initially, the United Provinces supported the Oriental Revolution and launched an army led by José Rondeau to help Artigas. However, since the conflict surrounded the Río de la Plata, it affected commercial interests of those merchants whose wealth depended on the ports of Buenos Aires and Montevideo. Besides, after Elío's request, the Portuguese had launched an army to the Eastern Bank to fight Buenos Aires and pacify the region. All of this, combined with the recent military failures (both in the Eastern Bank and Paraguay), destabilised the government and motivated negotiations with the respective governments. British diplomat Lord Strangford encouraged Buenos Aires to sign a treaty with Montevideo. However, the Junta Grande was not as quick as possible in singing those agreements. On 19 September 1811, an Open Cabildo was convened to discuss the reorganisation of the government, taking advantage of the fact that Saavedra had been sent to reorganise the Army of the North after the defeat of the First Upper Peru campaign. The Cabildo convinced the Junta of quitting the executive power and creating a new government: the First Triumvirate. The Junta continued to exist, renamed as Junta Conservadora, with the duty of supervising the new government, but lacking executive functions. The Triumvirate dissolved it months later.

=== First Triumvirate ===
The First Triumvirate was established on 23 September 1811 with Feliciano Antonio Chiclana, Manuel de Sarratea and Paso as triumvirs, although Paso was replaced by Juan Martín de Pueyrredón months later. Bernardino Rivadavia, Vicente López y Planes and José Julián Pérez were appointed as secretaries. The new government pressed for the rapid conclusion of treaties with both Paraguay and Montevideo on 12 and 20 October respectively, the last of which was well received by British diplomacy. The first one acknowledged Paraguay's independence from Buenos Aires, while the second treaty recognised the authority of the new viceroy appointed by the Council of Regency (Francisco Jaiver de Elío) over the Eastern Bank (including Montevideo) and the towns of Gualeguay, Gualeguaychú and Arroyo de la China, but not over the rest of the former Viceroyalty. Aditionally, it established that Elío had to secure the withdrawal of the Portuguese forces he himself had called upon.

The treaty implied the cessation of hostilities between the two governments, so Artigas and his followers were left alone. For this reason, they undertook the Oriental Exodus and moved towards the north with 900 registered families (4426 people) and around 4000 members of Artigas' army. They did 522 kilometres in 64 days, crossed the Uruguay River and settled in Ayuí, Entre Ríos. However, Montevideo accused Buenos Aires of continuing to support Artigas' army, while Buenos Aires complaint about the fact that the Portuguese army had not withdrawn from the Eastern Bank. The United Provinces and Portugal would sign a treaty on the matter and Portugal would withdraw, and because the government of Montevideo kept refusing Buenos Aires' authority, the Triumvirate would later began organising the Second Siege of Montevideo in September 1812.

On the other hand, on 22 October 1811, the Junta Conservadora finished writing a provisional constitution which dictated the functioning of the government and the separation of powers. They sent the law to the Triumvirate for its ratification, but the collegiate government rejected it and permanently dissolved the Junta. Later, on 22 November, the Triumvirate approved the 1811 Provisional Statute, a much simpler regulation. It formalised the government, organised a general and regular assembly, granted freedom of printing and individual security, and promised to convene a congress. The freedom of the press was regulated by a law sanctioned on 26 October, while the individual security was regulated by a subsequent law sanctioned on 23 November.

On 19 January 1812, a ship set sail from London for the United Provinces with José de San Martín, Carlos María de Alvear and other Spanish American officers who wanted to join the fight in South America. They arrived on 9 March 1812 and met with the Triumvirate, which a few days granted San Martín the effective rank of lieutenant colonel and ordered him to organise a military squadron, which later became the Regiment of Mounted Grenadiers. The officers secretly founded the Lautaro Lodge, in which they discussed the politics of the provinces and supervised the Triumvirate's actions. San Martín participated there while also training the new military corps during 1812.

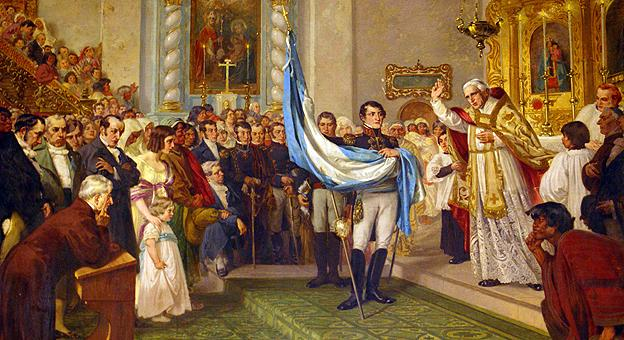
Blessing of the Argentine flag in San Salvador de Jujuy

Meanwhile, on 18 February 1812, the First Triumvirate approved the use of the Argentine cockade at Belgrano’s request, with the light blue and white pattern. Nonetheless, after this measure, the lawyer decided to create a flag with the cockade colours and raise it while he was in Rosario supervising the Paraná River, as well as to administer the oath to the new flag to his soldiers. When the Triumvirate found out, it ordered Belgrano to hide the flag and sent him a Spanish red and yellow one, but he had already departed for the north with the duty of reorganising the Army for a second Upper Peru campaign, so he did not receive the message.

Belgrano held another ceremony when he arrived in San Salvador de Jujuy, in which a priest blessed the flag. The Triumvirate reprimanded him; Belgrano answer that he would get rid of it, but whether he fullfilled his promise or not remains unknown. A few weeks later, the collegiate government ordered Belgrano to withdraw from the north and return to Córdoba. The lawyer obeyed despite his strong disagreement—as it meant giving up a lot of territory—, but when he and his soldiers reached Tucumán, the population supported the struggle, so Belgrano stopped there and successfully defended the city in the city. This event damaged the government’s reputation and marked a promising beginning for the Second Upper Peru campaign.

On 5 October, the news about Belgrano’s victory in Tucumán after ignoring government orders arrived in Buenos Aires and worsened the Triumvirate’s reputation, which was already bad due to different reasons, such as not having convened the congress promised by the 1811 Provisional Statute. San Martín, alongside the other members of the Lautaro Lodge, wanted to gain participation in the government in order to take more radical measures than the Triumvirate was willing to adopt, and waited until the election of new triumvirs. Nevertheless, their candidate—Bernardo de Monteagudo—was rejected, and a sympathiser of Rivadavia and his policies was chosen instead. Therefore, on 8 October 1812, San Martín and the Lautaro Lodge deployed the grenadiers and other soldiers across the Plaza de la Victoria to protest, while the Patriotic Society (a Morenist lodge) brought people to do the same. The First Triumvirate resigned and the Cabildo created the Second Triumvirate.

=== Second Triumvirate ===
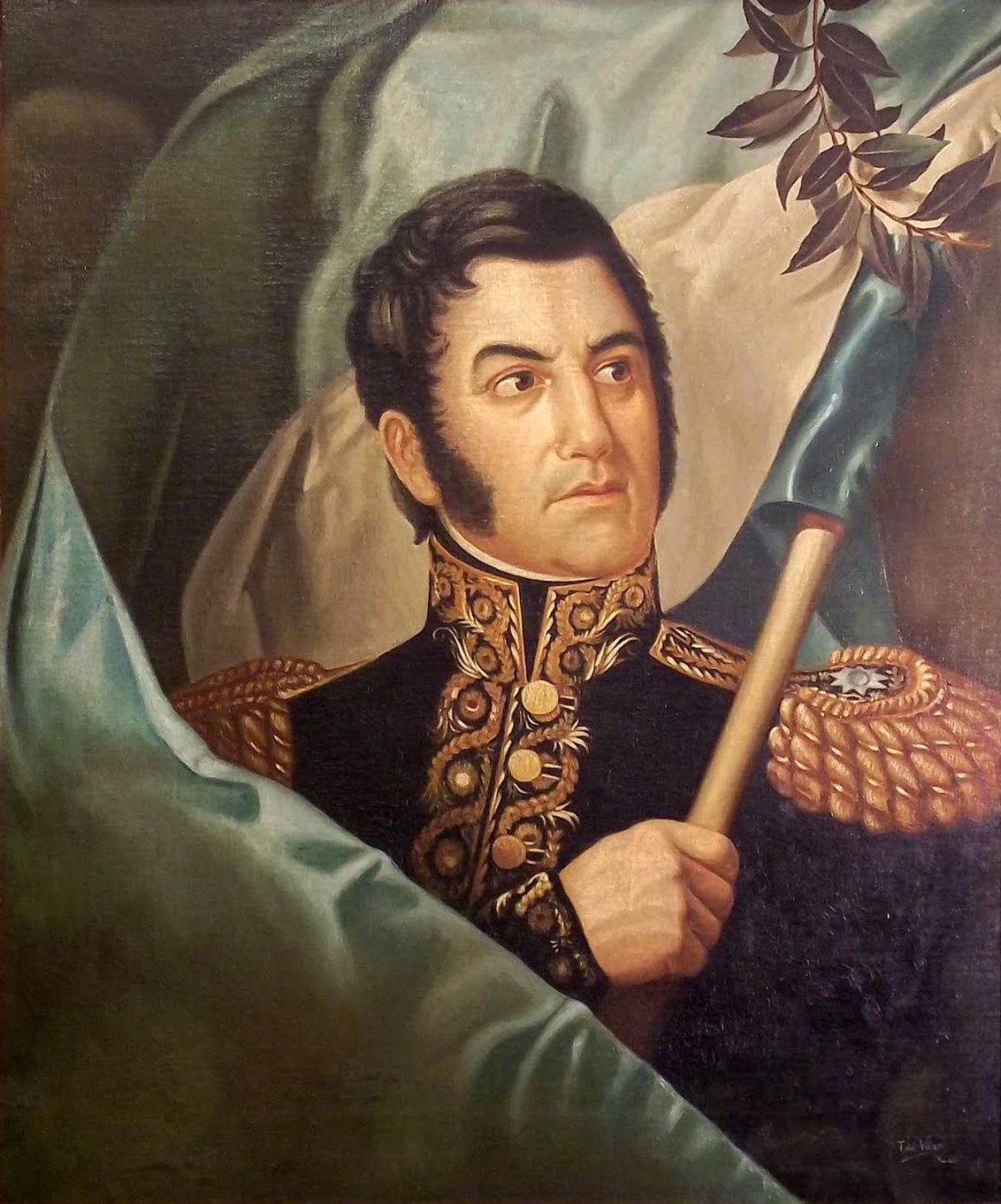
San Martín, Argentina's main national hero

The Second Triumvirate was established on 8 October 1812 with Morenist Rodríguez Peña, Peninsular liberal Antonio Álvarez Jonte and Paso as triumvirs. It marked the return of Morenist and radical ideas to the revolutionary government. Logically, it was supported by the Lautaro Lodge and the Patriotic Society—since these organisations promoted its creation—but the relation with San Martín was gradually ruined due to political disagreements with Alvear in the Lodge. Álvarez Jonte (San Martín's friend) was replaced by Gervasio Antonio de Posadas (Alvear's uncle).

Under the Second Triumvirate, the restablishment of the siege of Montevideo initiated by the First Triumvirate was made effective, as Rondeau reached the city. Later, Artigas would join. This siege provoked a lack of food supplies in Montevideo, so the urban militias started sacking territory of the United Provinces, such as the coasts of the Uruguay and the Paraná Rivers. During January and February 1813, a fleet from Montevideo disembarked at the San Carlos Convent, where it encountered strong resistance from locals. They prepared for a counterattack, as they thought the monastery might have valuable goods. However, San Martín, alongside his grenadiers, had been secretly following the fleet and were prepared to launch a surprise attack, which took place on 3 February 1813, in the Battle of San Lorenzo, where the Mounted Grenadiers had their baptism of fire and defeated the Montevideo militia. This ended the frequent sackings for a few months and boosted confidence in San Martín and his regiment.

On the other hand, Belgrano and the Army of the North were victorious in the Battle of Salta, securing many northern territories. Nonetheless, when they tried to recover Upper Peru, they were defeated at Vilcapugio and Ayohuma. This marked the failure of the Second Upper Peru campaign, although overall, it helped ensure that what is now northern Argentina became part of the country, unlike Upper Peru. Belgrano handed over command of the Army of the North to San Martín in the Yatasto relay, an important event in Argentine history that brought together the two most recognised figures of the Argentine independence. Nevertheless, San Martín did not last long in that office since his plan was to cross the Andes to defeat the Captaincy General of Chile and therefore attack the Viceroyalty of Peru by sea, instead of keeping trying to defeat its forces from the north of the United Provinces, as it was done during the First and the Second Upper Peru campaigns.

==== Assembly of the Year XIII ====
Provinces invited to the Assembly of the Year XIII

One of the Second Triumvirate's first measures was to convene an assembly with representatives from all the provinces to discuss important subjects related to the emerging State, as well as to act as a regular legislative power. It took place from 31 January 1813 until 24 January 1815. Historiographically, it is known as Asamblea del Año XIII (Assembly of the Year XIII), but its official name was Asamblea General Constituyente y Soberana del Año 1813 (General Constituent and Sovereign Assembly of the Year 1813). The Assembly held sessions in Buenos Aires.

Many subjects were debated during the two years in which the Assembly met. Although it was finally rejected, the idea of declaring independence from Spain had grown and was proposed by many deputies; different policies were adopted in that direction. Some historians relate this with the decline of liberal and democratic movements in Peninsular Spain, and the rise of conservative stances. However, some representatives were sent with the specific instruction not to consent independence, such as the deputies from Tucumán. The sanction of a constitution was discussed as well, but it was not approved.

Artigas was offered to send deputies in the name of the Eastern Bank. He accepted and sent them with the duty of demanding the declaration of independence, the establishment of a federal system, civil and religious freedom and other proposals. These ideas, considered to be radical by the government of Buenos Aires, led to his representatives being rejected from the Assembly. In response to this and other decisions, Artigas abandoned the siege of Montevideo, which he maintained along with Rondeau. Some historians claim that the rejection of Artigas' deputies was a shift to Enlightened absolutism by the old Morenists, who had radical ideas but wanted to govern without the people. Others say that the caudillos (such as Artigas) were incompatible, and therefore it was a good choice not to let them in.

Some of the measures taken by the Assembly were the following:

- Sanction of the Law of Wombs, which stated that the descendants of slaves were born free from there on
- Immediate freedom for any slave who entered the territory of the United Provinces from there on
- Abolition of the Inquisition and torture (torture instruments were burnt in the square)
- Abolition of noble ranks
- Abolition of the mit'a, encomienda and yanaconazgo (labour systems for indigenous people)
- Declaration of indigenous people as completely free citizens with the same rights as any other citizen
- Special taxes on wealthy people in order to finance the State and the military (500 pesos per year)
- Commission of the composition of an anthem
- Approval of the anthem composed under the name Marcha patriótica, nowadays known as the Argentine National Anthem
- Removal of Ferdinand VII's image from coins
- Creation of En unión y libertad ("In Union and Freedom") motto
- Creation of the coat of arms of Argentina
- Sanction of the 1813 Supreme Statute of the Executive Power in place of the 1811 Provisional Statute
- Creation of the Directory in place of the Triumvirate.

=== Supreme Directorship ===
The Directory was established on 31 January 1814 by the Assembly of the Year XIII. It consisted of a Supreme Director who exercised power during a two-year term and was to have a Council of State composed of seven members. It is considered a more unitarian form of government. In fact, the Directory was the longest-lived form of government until the formalisation of the Confederation, although the supreme directors changed many times.

==== Posadas' Directorship ====
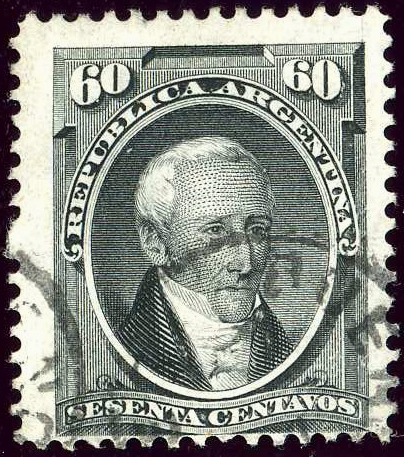
Argentine bill displaying Posadas

The Assembly of the Year XIII chose Posadas as the first Supreme Director of the United Provinces. His directorship was marked by the Second Eastern Bank campaign and the appointment of San Martín as governor of Cuyo, intended to organise the Crossing of the Andes. However, Posadas had to deal with the return of Ferdinand VII to the Spanish throne, as well as with the ongoing conflict with Artigas, which had started after the rejection of his deputies from the Assembly of the Year XIII, but had its antecedents in the treaty signed by the First Triumvirate with Montevideo. The conflict pitted centralism against federalism and would quickly led to the beginning of the Argentine Civil Wars, specifically, on 22 February 1814, in the Battle of El Espinillo.

Ferdinand VII returned to the Spanish throne in 1814 after signing the Treaty of Valençay with Napoleon, whose empire was going through a crisis after the failure of the Russian campaign, and thus could not keep fighting the Peninsular War nor maintaining its domain over Spain. On 4 May 1814, King Ferdinand abolished the Spanish Constitution of 1812—which had established that the Spanish territories in the Americas were not colonies but rather equal parts of the Spanish crown—and began persecuting liberals and political dissidents who were against the restoration of absolutism. This radical shift to conservatism by Ferdinand VII strengthened the possibility of declaring total independence from Spain.

Nonetheless, Posadas' government attempted to negotiate with Spain and Europe. On 25 May 1814, Sarratea (who at that time was the representative of the United Provinces in Europe) addressed Ferdinand VII from London to tell him that the war in Spanish America was a "civil discord" caused by the abuses committed by the provisional Peninsular authorities. Ferdinand VII did not respond; later, his minister of the Indies said that the independence of the Spanish American territories was an impracticable fantasy. During the second half of 1814, the Assembly approved the undertaking of a diplomatic mission to Europe. Posadas appointed Belgrano and Rivadavia with public instructions to congratulate Ferdinand VII on his return to the throne, expose the abuses committed by the Peninsular authorities and seek reconciliation.

Secretly, Rivadavia was provided with more specific instructions, which included prioritising an agreement with the United Kingdom or another European country capable of supporting the independence of the United Provinces. Should that not be the case, the instructions contemplated negotiations with Ferdinand VII with the prime objective of achieving political independence under another monarch of the House of Bourbon, but regarded civil liberty under Ferdinand VII with a local administration as the minimum acceptable option. The negotiations with Spain had both the objective of reaching an agreement but also of delaying as much as possible the dispatch of a military expedition from the metropole, although, in the end, this enterprise would disembark in Venezuela in 1815.

On the other hand, Posadas supported enthusiastically the project of the creation of a naval squadron intended to end Montevideo's control over the rivers, which had begun during the last weeks of the Second Triumvirate's administration. On 1 March 1814, he appointed William Brown as lieutenant colonel and commander of the squadron. On 15 March 1814, Brown defeated Captain Jacinto de Romarate in the Naval Battle of Martín García and occupied the island. On 20 April 1814, he established a naval blockade against Montevideo, and on 17 May 1814 he defeated its fleet again in the Battle of Buceo, permanently ending the naval superiority of the present-day capital of Uruguay. Finally, on 20 June 1814, after almost four years of conflict, Captain General of Montevideo Gaspar de Vigodet negotiated the surrender. On 23 June 1814, Alvear—who Posadas had appointed as chief as a replacement for Rondeau—occupied the city.

This last-minute replacement led Rondeau to think that it was intended to portray Alvear as the conqueror of Montevideo. Posadas appointed him as general-in-chief of the Army of the North in place of San Martín, who had left in order to recover from a stomach ulcer. Rondeau spent the rest of the year reorganising and preparing the army for a third Upper Peru campaign. Meanwhile, Posadas appointed San Martín as governor of Cuyo at his request. Cuyo was a former Argentine province that included present-day territories of the provinces Mendoza, San Juan and San Luis, and limited with Chile. San Martín spent two years there organising an army for the Crossing of the Andes with local help.

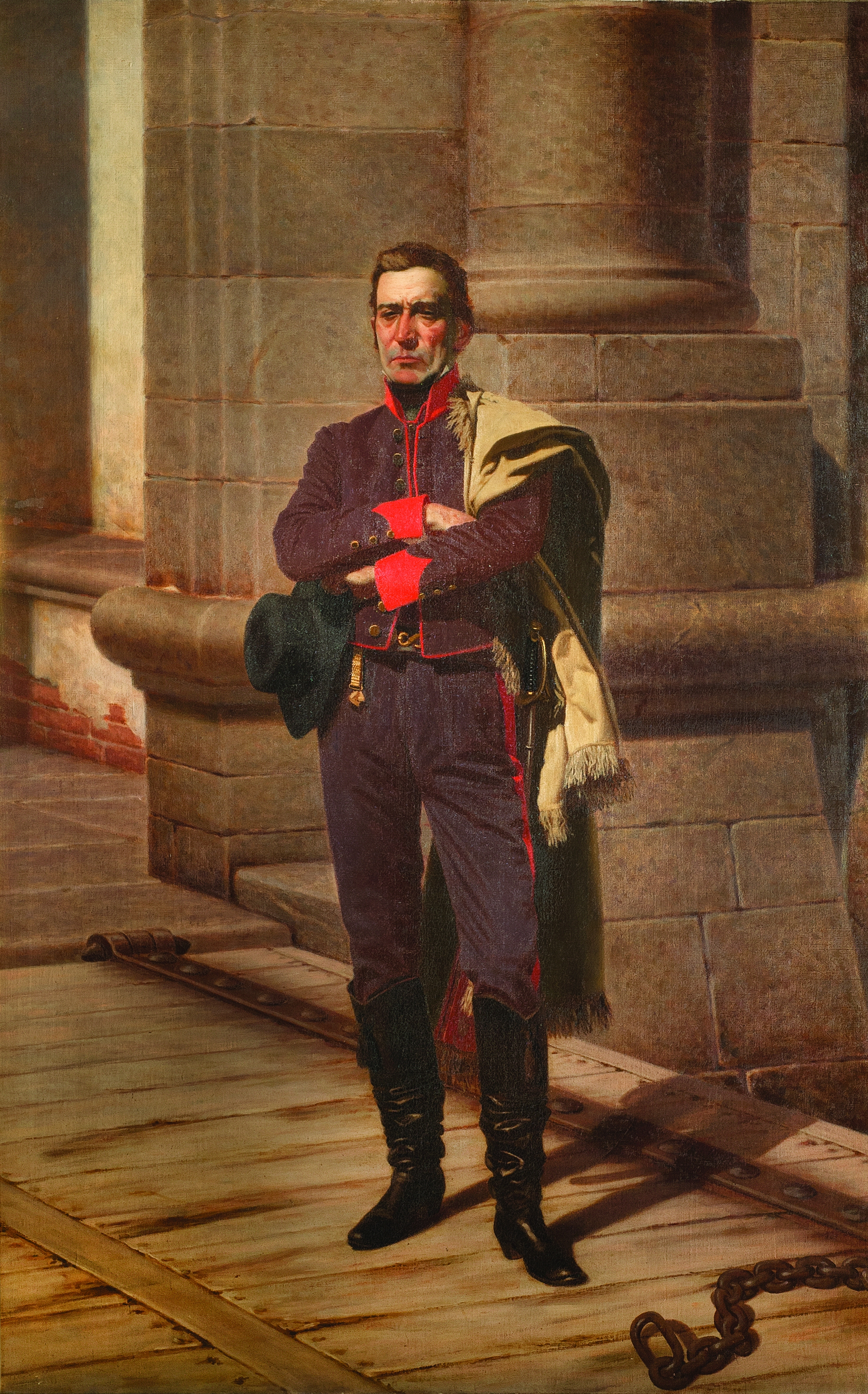
Artigas, protector of the Free Peoples

Meanwhile, in February 1814 the Province of Entre Ríos rebelled against Buenos Aires' authority, following Artigas, and achieved autonomy after the Battle of El Espinillo. Posadas declared Artigas a traitor to the nation, but this did not stop his movement. The Province of Corrientes rebelled against its Cabildo, declared autonomy and adhered to the "federation system, with General Artigas as Protector". Misiones embraced federalism as well, with Andresito Artigas (Artigas' adopted son) as governor. These rebel provinces, with Artigas as their leader, constituted the Union of the Free Peoples, commonly referred to as the Federal League, which became an alternative to Buenos Aires' government for the Río de la Plata provinces.

This civil war between the United Provinces and the Federal League reached the Eastern Bank. At first, the government of Buenos Aires had the upper hand: Alvear won a battle against Fernando Otorgués while Manuel Dorrego defeated Artigas in the Battle of Marmarajá. Nevertheless, the situation was reversed with the federal victory in the Battle of Guayabos on 10 January 1815, after which the entire Oriental Province (the Eastern Bank, including Montevideo, which means most of present-day Uruguayan territory) entered the Federal League. This growing conflict, along with the return of Ferdinand VII to the Spanish throne in the previous year, complicated Posadas' directorship. His last measure was to try to replace Rondeau by Alvear, again, this time as general-in-chief of the Army of the North. However, the soldiers did not recognise the appointment. Alvear retreated to Buenos Aires before reaching the north and Posadas resigned on 9 January.

==== Alvear's Directorship ====
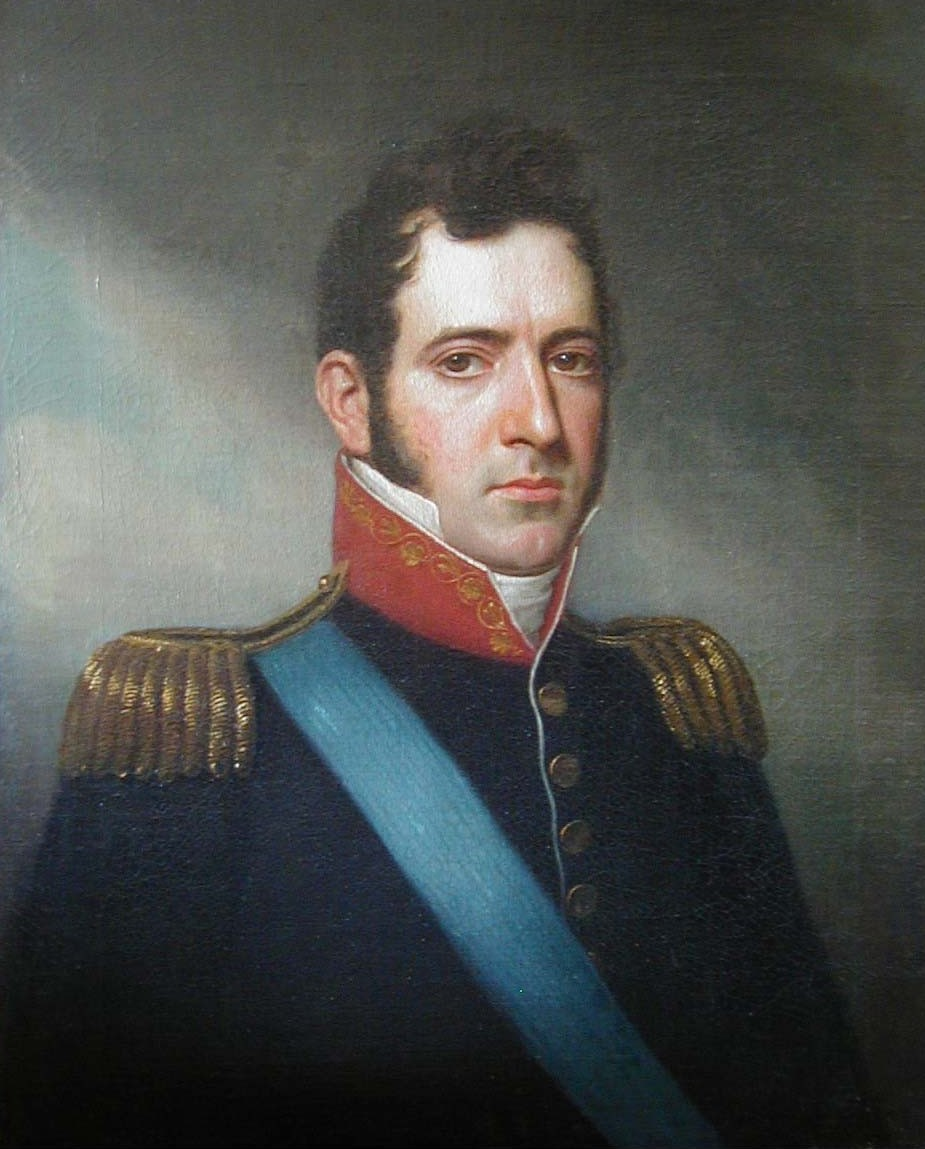
Alvear's portrait

The Assembly of the Year XIII appointed Alvear as supreme director on 9 January 1815 after the resignation of his uncle Posadas. His directorship was marked by a strong persecution of political dissent and adversaries—he organised an espionage network, executed people without prior trial and ended up decreeing the death penalty for anyone who criticised his government. Alvear was primarily supported by the members of the Lautaro Lodge (except for San Martín, who was already at odds with him and opposed his directorship). Some historians consider this government as the final ideological degeneration and shift to elitism of the old Morenists. Although his government lasted 95 days, some authors such as Felipe Pigna considered him a dictator. Regarding his federal opponents, Alvear was seen as an expression of unitarianism and centralism.

The Supreme Director also had aristocratic opponents who objected to his French ideas and considered him a traitor to his class, because he came from an aristocratic family. Alvear responded to this group not only with persecution but by imposing high taxes as well. He also seized funds from factories belonging to churches and pious confraternities, Besides, faced with the danger of an absolutist expedition sent by Ferdinand VII, who had just returned to the Spanish throne, Alvear allowed slaves to enlist in the army in exchange for freedom.

The governor of Córdoba, Francisco Ortiz de Ocampo, resigned after being threatened by Artigas, and was replaced by José Javier Díaz. Eventually, this new Cordobese government stopped recognising the Directory and joined the Federal League. However, the intendant of La Rioja—which at that time, was part of Córdoba—, refused to acknowledge Artigas' authority and remained loyal to Buenos Aires. Alvear, willing to solve the conflict, offered Artigas the independence of the Oriental Province, but he refused, arguing that he was committed to his entire League, which encompassed most of the Argentine littoral, and that his project was not about separatism, but about bringing federalism to all the provinces.

Due to the desperate situation, on 28 February, Alvear sent the diplomat Manuel José García to Rio de Janeiro to negotiate with the British consul Lord Strangford the possibility of turning the United Provinces into a protectorate of the United Kingdom, hoping to end the civil war and consolidate a central government without Artigas interference. This plan, known as la misión García (the García Mission), did not succeed because the United Kingdom and Spain had become allies against Napoleon, and the United Provinces were still part formally a part of the Spanish Monarchy. A few weeks later, another federal revolution broke out, this time in Santa Fe, which appointed Francisco Candioti as governor and got the province into the Federal League. With the objective of recovering the province, Alvear launched an army which however refused to fullfill its dutie and issued a proclamation against him during the Mutiny of Fontezuelas, led by Ignacio Álvarez Thomas. The Supreme Director resigned on 14 April 1815 and went into exile aboard a British frigate, many of his supporters were arrested or exiled and the Lautaro Lodge ceased to exist.

On 14 April 1815, the Assembly of the Year XIII, whose politicians were mostly entwined with Alvear's government, accepted the Supreme Director's resignation and attempted to organise a new triumvirate. Nevertheless, the next day, an uprising led by Miguel Estanislao Soler demanded that the Cabildo resume national authority, arguing that the Assembly had no authority whatsoever since it had already been rejected by many towns that its deputies claimed to represent. The Cabildo accepted and convened the neighbours to elect an electoral college composed of 12 members, which the elected Rondeau as Supreme Director and Álvarez Thomas as interim Supreme Director (Rondeau was in Upper Peru), and organised the Junta of Observation, in order to prevent the rise of authoritarianism, as had happened during Alvear's supreme directorship. This Junta was also in charge of drafting a new provisional statute.

==== Rondeau-Álvarez Thomas' Directorship ====
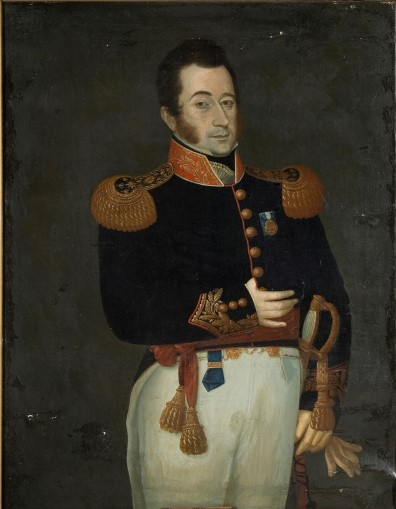
Álvarez Thomas' portrait

Álvarez Thomas was sworn in on 21 April 1815 and assumed military command. On 6 May, he formally assumed the office of Interim Supreme Director, after taking an oath to uphold the 1815 Provisional Statute, drafted by the Junta of Observation to replace the old 1813 Supreme Statute of the Executive Power. This new statute, among other things, established that the new Junta would be in charge of the Legislative Power until a new national congress—which had to be convened as soon as possible—decided otherwise. Within that framework, Álvarez Thomas would convene the Congress of Tucumán on 17 May 1815, where many politicians expected to declare independence. The Lautaro Lodge would ceaste to exist and many supporters of Alvear's government would be arrested.

During 1815, Belgrano and Rivadavia stayed in Europe within the framework of the diplomatic mission organised during Posadas' administration, and helped Sarratea with the negocio de Italia ("business of Italy"), which consisted of negotiating with Charles IV (former king of Spain, at that time exiled in Italy) the possibility of crowning Francisco de Paula (Ferdinand VII's brother) king of the United Provinces. On 10 July 1815, Álvarez Thomas ordered Belgrano and Rivadavia to come back to the country, citing the return of Napoleon to the throne—which gave them hope that Spain would have to concentrate its resources on the war in Europe—the unaffordable economic cost of the diplomatic mission and the well-known anti-liberal principles of Ferdinand VII, which made any attempt to negotiate pointless. Belgrano set sail in November, but Rivadavia remained in Europe. He would later travel to Madrid to negotiate with the government, although on that ocasiobn the main objective would be to delay any possible military expedition, since the possibility of reaching an agreement with the King had been ruled out. After the Battle of Waterloo, Ferdinand VII's authority was consolidated, so his father ended up rejecting the project of crowning his other son to avoid any possible confrontation.

On the other hand, back in South America, by 17 April 1815 the Third Upper Peru campaign, which Rondeau had been organising, had begun. Francisco Fernández de la Cruz, with 500 men and the help of Martín Miguel de Güemes, defeated Antonio Vigil and his army in the Battle of Puesto del Marqués. Joaquín de la Pezuela undertook a strategic retreat to Oruro and the majority of Upper Peru was annexed by the United Provinces by July. Nonetheless, Pezuela's army received reinforcements while encamped in Oruro, and counterattacked on 29 November in the Battle of Viluma. Rondeau was defeated and the campaign was sealed as a failure, meaning the loss of the majority of Upper Peru once again. There would later occur what some historians consider to be the Fourth Upper Peru campaing, but it was not at all as big as the previous ones, and therefore, the defeat of the Third campaign marked the definitive loss of the territory by the United Provinces.

Güemes and his troops had split from the Army of the North following disagreements with Rondeuau after the Battle of Puesto del Marqués. They took with them weapons from the Army's arsenal in Jujuy and headed towards Salta, which was going through a difficult situation due to the absence of governor and the demands of Buenos Aires on the province for resources for the Army of the North. Güemes, who had strong popular support, was appointed governor of Salta on 6 May 1815, marking the first time that the people of that province elected their own governor. Salta achieved political independence without renouncing its ties to the United Provinces. After his defeat on the Battle of Viluma, Rondeau headed back to Salta. Conflict was expected by both Rondeau and Güemes. On 15 March 1816, the new governor of Salta let him take over the provincial capital, while he and his men remained encamped in Cerrillos. During 3 days, Güemes' gauchos stole cattle, horses and resources from Salta, while blocking the entry of any communications or aid that might come from the outside. Rondeau and his army marched towards Cerrillos with the objective of subduing Güemes, but they were sacked again in Tejada. On 22 March, the demoralisation and lack of resources made Rondeau sign a treaty recognising Güemes as the legitimate governor of Salta.

Meanwhile, Artigas sent representatives to sign a peace treaty with Buenos Aires, but Álvarez Thomas ordered their arrest. Then, in order to finish the work that he refused to continue with during the Mutiny of Fontezuelas, he launched an army under Juan José Viamonte's command, which recovered the Province of Santa Fe from Artigas. However, on 2 March 1816, the caudillos Mariano Vera and Estanislao López rebelled and besieged the city of Santa Fe. On 31 March, Viamonte surrendered, so the province's autonomy and allegiance with Artigas was restored. In response, Álvarez Thomas launched another army, but General Díaz Vélez made an agreement with the federalists and disobeyed his orders. Therefore, on 16 Aprill 1816 the Supreme Director ended up resigning in circumstances similar to the mutiny which had allowed his appointment. On the same day, the Cabildo and the Junta of Observation held a meeting and appointed Antonio González Balcarce as Supreme Director on an interim basis.

==== Congresses of Tucumán and Oriente ====
Provinces loyal to Buenos Aires vs. provinces loyal to the Federal League

As mentioned previously, on 17 May 1815 Álvarez Thomas had convened the general congress required by the 1815 Statute, which was to take place in Tucumán, as that province was located approximately in the centre of the territory claimed by the United Provinces. The Congress of Tucumán started meeting on 24 March 1816, although Álvarez Thomas ended up quiting shortly after. He invited all the provinces of the former Viceroyalty of the Río de la Plata, including Paraguay and the provinces of Upper Peru. Deputies from Buenos Aires, Tucumán, Santiago del Estero, San Juan, San Luis, La Rioja, Catamarca, Mendoza and Salta attended the Congress, as well as deputies from provinces that are now part of Bolivia (at that time, Upper Peru), such as Charcas, Chichas and Mizque. Paraguay did not attend; nor did the provinces of the Federal League (Santa Fe, Entre Ríos, Corrientes, Misiones and the Easternk Bank), which have already participated of a Congress of Oriente convened by Artigas in 1815. Córdoba was the only exception—it sent deputies to Tucumán despite being part of the League. By 1817, Córdoba would be fully reincorporated into the Directory's political sphere, under governor Manuel Antonio Castro.

The Congress in Tucumán, the Junta of Observation and the Cabildo of Buenos Aires were important centres of national political power that would sometimes overlap. Firstly, on 3 May 1816, the Congress elected Pueyrredón as the new Supreme Director. He was among the deputies and was sworn in in Tucumán; Balcarce continued to work in his place while he travelled to Buenos Aires. On 9 July 1816, after long arguments, the deputies finally declared independence from "King Ferdinand VII, his successors and metropole", thus raising the United Provinces to the rank of a sovereign nation. The document was circulated in Spanish, but also in Quechua and Aymara, as the Congress ordered it to be translated. On 11 July 1816, the Cabildo of Buenos Aires and the Junta of Observation dismissed Balcarce and organised a Provisional Governing Commission made up of Antonio de Escalada and Miguel de Irigoyen, while Pueyrredón—elected by the Congress—was still on his way to Buenos Aires. On 19 July 1816, after Pedro Medrano's proposal, the deputies added «and from any other foreign domination» to the Act of Independence, emphasising the country's sovereignty. On 25 July, the Congress officially approved the Argentine light blue and white flag, which had already been used in the Fort of Buenos Aires since 17 April 1815. The deputies also discussed the form of government. Belgrano proposed crowning an indigenous monarch—this project became known as the Inca Plan, and was supported by San Martín and Güemes, but it was ultimately shelved. The Congress served as the legislative power of the United Provinces until 1820, and it was moved to Buenos Aires in 1817.

Regarding the provinces of the Federal League, some historians believe that they declared independence in 1815 in their congress, based on a letter written by Artigas. However, this is not that relevant since the federal provinces had already declared independence when they joined the League. For instance, Cordobese Governor Diaz had stated on 17 April 1815 that the Cordobese people were "free and independent from any authority other than their capital's", while the Province of Corrientes had declared "independence under the federal system with Artigas as protector". In fact, Artigas' officials from the Oriental Province were sworn in stating their recognition of the independence and sovereignty of the province, as well as their rejection of both Spanish authority and any other foreign domination.

==== Pueyrredón's Directorship ====
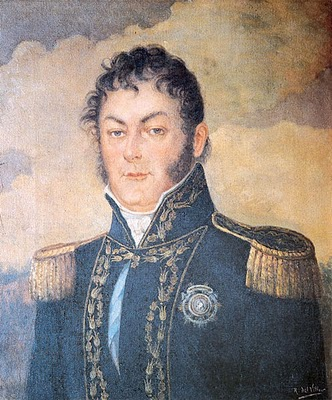
Pueyrredón's portrait

After being elected Supreme Director by the Congress of Tucumán on 3 May 1816, Pueyrredón had to return to Buenos Aires in order to properly exercise his office. Before arriving at the capital, he held meetings with General Rondeau, Governor Güemes and Governor San Martín—the last of these was particularly important for San Martín to ensure economic support from Buenos Aires for the army he had been raising in Cuyo since 1814, with the goal of carrying out the Crossing of the Andes. Pueyrredón arrived at the capital on 29 July 1816 and immediately took office; he appointed López y Planes as secretary of Government and Foreign Affairs, Domingo Trillo as secretary of Finance and Juan Florencio Terrada as secretary of War and Navy.

An urgent subject that Pueyrredón had to face at the very beginning of his term was the imminent invasion of the Oriental Province by the United Kingdom of Portugal, Brazil and the Algarves. Diplomat Manuel García—who was in Rio de Janeiro since 1815—had already been negotiating with the Luso-Brazilians regarding the attack, submitting a memorandum in April 1816. He hoped the invasion would put an end to the "spread of the [federal] disease" and thus allow the unification of the country under a unitarian government, even if it was at the expense of losing a province. Besides, after the previous Spanish military expedition had disembarked in Venezuela, and as a new one was being organised, it was rumored that this time it would be headed towards the Río de la Plata. The politicians in the United Provinces feared that the Luso-Brazilians might support the Spanish attack, and thought that allowing them to invade the Oriental Province could be a way of ensuring their neutrality.

Pueyrredón's government inherited this policy. The conquest finally began on 28 August 1816 with the capture of the Fortaleza de Santa Teresa, to which the Supreme Director did not respond militarily, neither declaring war on the Luso-Brazilians nor breaking off diplomatic relations with them. Although he did not fund the invasion, his government's policy from that point onward ended up favouring the Luso-Brazilians. Their neutrality within the framework of the Argentine War of Independence was ensured, and the Federal League was weakened as expected. Pueyrredón offered the representatives of Montevideo his support in exchange for adherence to his government, but Artigas rejected it since it meant relinquishing the League and federalism. The Luso-Brazilians captured the present-day capital of Uruguay on 20 January 1817, but the League continued to resist in the countryside. Although he spoke out against the occupation, Pueyrredón decided to maintain commercial relations with the new government of Montevideo. Besides, during his administration, five military campaigns were launched against provinces of the Federal League (two against Santa Fe and three against Entre Ríos), which forced the federalists to split their forces.

On the other hand, between 1816 and 1817, San Martín and the army he had raised with the help and sacrifice of the people of Cuyo, were about to undertake what would be their greatest military feat. By the end of 1816, Pueyrredón managed to deliver military supplies, uniforms, specie and bills of exchange with a total value of 415,228 pesos, which constituted the central government's largest contribution. In January 1817, the Army finally undertook the Crossing of the Andes. The Spanish government in Chile was aware of the campaign, but uncertain about where the attack would come from, as San Martín had split the Army into six different columns, some of them whose main purpose was distracting the enemy. By 10 February 1817, the two main columns had assembled north of the Chacabuco pass, near the capital city of Santiago. After the royalists found out, Brigadier Rafael Maroto and his army marched towards the patriots. On 12 February 1817, the Army of the Andes defeated the Spanish royalists in the Battle of Chacabuco, which allowed them to occupy Santiago.

The northern and central cities of Chile recognised the new government, while the royalists entrenched themselves in the south. On 9 December 1817, the Viceroy of Peru sent reinforcements under Mariano Osorio's command. They disembarked at the port of Talcahuano, in the south of Chile. San Martín feared that the royalist reinforcements would join José Ordóñez's forces at Talcahuano and then sail north to land near Valparaíso before advancing on Santiago. He therefore ordered the patriot forces to concentrate. Osorio ultimately advanced north by land, but retreated towards Talca when San Martín marched south against him. The United Army, composed of the Army of the Andes and Chilean patriot forces, pursued the royalists and camped at Cancha Rayada on 19 March 1818. That night, a surprise attack led by Ordóñez defeated and dispersed the patriot army. Rumours began circulating regarding the deaths of San Martín and Bernardo O'Higgins. Nonetheless, this was not true—they were able to reorganise the Army and defeat the royalists in the Battle of Maipú (5 April 1818), consolidating the independence of Chile.

San Martín travelled to Buenos Aires to discuss important matters regarding his plan to attack Peru, now that the royalists in Chile had been defeated. He stayed in the city from 11–12 May to 4 July 1818 and held multiple meetings with Pueyrredón, and at some point with members of the Lautaro Lodge, which had been reorganised by the Supreme Director. These meetings addressed different topics such as how to raise the required amount of around 500,000 pesos for the Army, and whether the Army should attack Peru or return to Buenos Aires instead, in order to fight the Federal League or the royalist fleet which was being assembled in Spain and could disembark at the Río de la Plata. San Martín was reluctant to get involved into the Civil War and considered the War of Independence to be a priority. Pueyrredón continued to support his plan and let him return to Chile. However, in 1819 he ordered San Martín to bring the army stationed in Chile back to Cuyo, and wait there for orders. He complied only partially, as he left a significant part of the army in Chile.

Back to the politics of the United Provinces, Pueyrredón supported different projects to crown a European monarch, the most notorious being that of Charles Louis, the prince of Lucca, which was being negotiated with Europe. Nevertheless, before having anything resembling a monarchy, the country needed to be organised, and by 1819, it was divided into two: the United Provinces and the Federal League. To strengthen its claim to legitimate national authority, the government in Buenos Aires required a constitution that restored the prestige of its political project—a constitution which, by vesting sovereignty exclusively in the nation, subordinated the cities and provinces to the central government. In August 1817, the Congress organised a Drafting Committee for the constitution. The formal debates took place between 31 July 1818 and 22 April 1819, when the 1819 Constitution was finally sanctioned. This new document replaced what was addressed in the 1817 Provisional Regulations, established unitarianism and centralism by law, and although it did not specify a form of government, it was oriented towards a monarchy. Logically, the provinces of the Federal League rejected it, but their reaction was worse than expected. On 9 June 1819, within that framework, and considering the disapproval regarding his stance on the Luso-Brazilian invasion of the Oriental Province, Pueyrredón resigned as Supreme Director. The Congress appointed Rondeau as his successor.

==== Rondeau's Directorship ====
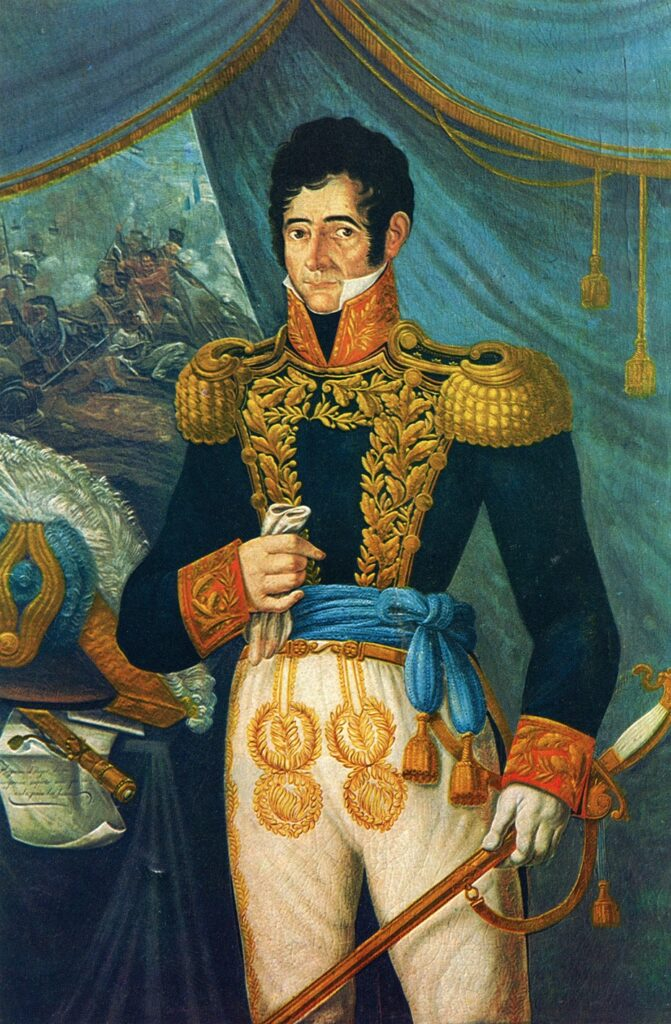
Rondeau's portrait

The Congress appointed Rondeau Supreme Director on 9 June 1819 and he was sworn in the next day. In contrast to his previous appointment on 20 April 1815, this time Rondeau did exercise his office, although his authority outside Buenos Aires was quite tenuos. All the provinces of the Directorial Union took an oath to the Constitution, but some of them continued to operate with significant autonomy. For instance, the governors of Córdoba and Tucumán were loyal to the Directory, but both of them faced strong opposition (federalists, in the case of Córdoba, which prevented the directory from easily exercising its power over the province). On the other hand, although both Cuyo and Salta recognised Rondeau's authority, were as well important centres of military power whose military leaders had forged alliances with the Directory, on which the latter was dependent due to its limited control over the armies.

During his administration, Rondeau focused on eliminating the federalists in order to consolidate the central authority, rather than on fighting foreign powers such as Spain, or Portugal-Brazil. That is why he proposed to the Luso-Brazilians that they "chase the common [federalist] enemy to Entre Ríos and the Paraná [river]". This was a call to invade the national territory. During the last months of 1819, Rondeau requested that the Armies of the North and the Andes be gathered near Buenos Aires to defend the province and fight the federalists. The former accepted and marched towards the capital, but San Martín refused to abandon the Continental Plan and become involved in the Civil War, hence he returned to Chile and subsequently ordered his army to join him.

On 11 November 1819, a small garrison of the Army of the North stationed in Tucumán overthrew the governor. The uprising's motivations were not proclaimed. However, it was known that many soldiers were against fighting the Civil War instead of the War of Independence. An open cabildo held three days later elected Bernabé Aráoz as governor, breaking off relations with the Directory. On the other hand, the rest of the Army of the North staged the Arequito Revolt before reaching Buenos Aires, stating that they refused to fight the Civil War. Thereafter, the Army of the North headed back to Córdoba. Before arriving, General Juan Bautista Bustos persuaded the directorial governor to resign. He accepted and ceded power to the Cordobese cabildo, which re-appointed Diaz as governor and proclaimed the province's sovereignty, thus breaking off relations with the Directory.

The status of the central government was critical. The Federal League rejected the Constitution from day one, Tucumán and Córdoba had stepped away from the Directorial Union, and neither Salta nor Cuyo was really subject to the Directory, nor were they willing to help strengthen its army. The Luso-Brazilians, although they had defeated Artigas in the Battle of Tacuarembó and conquered the entire Oriental Province, refused to go beyond that territory, which was their objective from the beginning. San Martín had refused to send the Army of the Andes, and now the Army of the North had refused to participate in the Civil War as well. However, the Federal League still existed, and federal governors Francisco Ramírez and Estanislao López, from Entre Ríos and Santa Fe respectively, were marching towards the north of Buenos Aires with their armies, willing to "oust the desposts from power". On 31 January 1820, the Congress appointed Juan Pedro Aguirre Supreme Director on an interim basis while Rondeau took with him the Army of Buenos Aires, made up of around 2000 men, and headed towards Cepeda. On 1 February 1820, he positioned the cavalry on the flanks, and the infantry and artillery on the centre. However, the federal army was able to surround the formation and attack from behind, defeating the directorial troops. The army dispersed, significantly damaging the military power of the Directory.

On the night of 2–3 February, after learning about Rondeau's military defeat, Interim Supreme Director Aguirre prepared the city's defence. He ordered the organisation of the Internal and the External Armies, under Viamonte's and Miguel Estanislao Soler's commands respectively, with the remaining soldiers and militias. Soler and the External Army camped in the countryside, near where the federalist army of López and Ramírez was located, waiting for a possible battle. On 5 February, Rondeau resumed office as supreme director. However, Soler spent the following days negotiating. The federalists made it clear that they were not willing to accept any peace treaty that did not involve the dissolution of the national government, and Soler considered that it was neither worth continuing to fight for the Directory, nor did they have enough strength to do so. Therefore, on 10 February, Soler sent a dispatch to the Cabildo of Buenos Aires informing of the conditions established by the federalists, and asking for the dissolution of the national institutions. The Cabildo forwarded the request. On 11 February 1820, the Congress announced its dissolution and Rondeau resigned from the supreme directorship, ending the national government of the United Provinces.

== Downfall ==
The result of the wars was the independence of the provinces. Several new nations appeared, there were:

=== Bolivia ===
Five provinces would go on to become Bolivia: Charcas, Cochabamba, Mizque, Chichas, and Tarija.

=== Uruguay ===
The Eastern Province (Provincia Oriental) became independent as Uruguay as a consequence of the treaty of Montevideo, partly retaining its old name in its official name: the Oriental Republic of Uruguay. Due to the text of the aforementioned treaty, United Provinces and Imperial Brazil both renounced their claims to the province and agreed to grant it independence, but the treaty did not include nor ask the Orientals' opinion, and also omitted to detail the borders of the new state what would give Brazil a chance to move its borders further south. The Constitutional Assembly approved the Constitution of Uruguay on 10 September 1829 and it was sworn by the citizens on 18 July 1830.

=== Brazil ===
The Misiones Orientales, after years of Portuguese dominion, were recovered with the 1828 Campaign of Fructuoso Rivera at the Misiones Orientales, but it was de jure recognized as Brazilian, following the outcome of the Cisplatine War.

=== Argentina ===
Following a long civil war, the following provinces joined to become the Argentine Republic: Buenos Aires (The outpost of Carmen de Patagones in Patagonia is now part of Buenos Aires Province), Catamarca, Córdoba, Corrientes, Entre Ríos, Jujuy, La Rioja, Mendoza, Salta, San Juan, San Luis, Santa Fe, Santiago del Estero, and Tucumán.

== Flags ==
| Since | Until | Flag | Notes |
|---|---|---|---|
| 25 May 1810 | 17 April 1815 | | Since proclaming independence was not the declared goal from the beginning, the Primer Junta and the governments that succeeded it used the Spanish flag. Manuel Belgrano created the Argentine flag on 27 February 1812, but it was not officially adopted and the Triumvirate ordered to hide it. |
| 17 April 1815 | 20 August 1985 | | The Argentine flag, (Note: On 25 July 1816, the Congress of Tucumán adopted the official flag of the United Provinces of the Río de la Plata—three horizontal stripes, with the central one white and the outer ones sky blue—though explicitly on a provisional basis: it would serve as a "minor flag" until, once the form of government of the nascent country had been defined, the "major flag" could be established. In 1818, the Sun of May was incorporated to create the war flag, but the version without the sun remained formally the national flag.) which was already used by the army, was hoisted on the Fort of Buenos Aires for the first time on 17 April 1815 by Colonel Antonio Luis Beruti. |
| 25 February 1818 | Nowadays | | The Sun was added to the war flag by the Congress of Tucumán on 23 February 1818. Since 20 August 1985, this flag behaves as the only Argentine national flag. |
| 1819 | 1820 | | The specific colour of the flag was not defined until 2010, so it was common to see a more darker tone of blue, especially during the first half of the 19th century. However, according to some sources, the darker blue was preferred from 1819 to 1820 due to the negotiations being held with France regarding the establishment of a monarchy in the United Provinces. The blue flag is often cited as the flag of the United Provinces, since it was the flag desplayed in the infobox of the Spanish article of Wikipedia for a long time. |
| 1829 | 13 April 1836 | | During Rosas' administration, darker tones of blue were preferred, since light blue was associated to unitarians, his political opponents. |

== See also ==
- Name of Argentina
- Viceroyalty of the Río de la Plata
- Rise of the Argentine Republic
- Argentine War of Independence
- Argentine Civil Wars
- Etymology of Argentina

== Bibliography ==
- Crow, John A. (1992). The Epic of Latin America (4th ed.). Berkeley: University of California Press. ISBN 978-0-520-07723-2.
- Kopka, Deborah (2011). Central & South America. Dayton, OH: Lorenz Educational Press. ISBN 978-1-4291-2251-1.
- Símbolos Nacionales de la República Argentina ISBN 950-691-036-7
- Galasso, Norberto (2024). Breve historia argentina [Brief Argentine History] (in Spanish). Buenos Aires: Colihue. ISBN 978-987-684-247-1.
