= Etymology of Argentina =

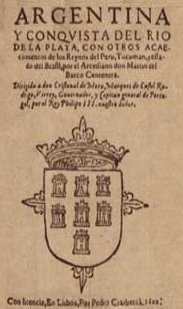
Cover of the first edition of the poem La Argentina by Martín del Barco Centenera, 1602

Argentina (an Italian adjective meaning "silvery") is ultimately derived from the Latin argentum "silver" and the feminine of the adjectival suffix -inus. The first use of the name Argentina can be traced back to the first voyages made by the Spanish and Portuguese conquistadors to the Río de la Plata (meaning "River of Silver") in the first years of the 16th century.

== Colonization ==
Aleixo Garcia, one of the survivors of the shipwrecked expedition mounted by Juan Díaz de Solís in 1516, heard notices about a powerful White King in a country very rich in silver, at the mountains called "Sierra de la Plata". Garcia then organized an expedition and reached Potosí's area, gaining several silver objects and gifts. He was killed by the Payaguás, returning to Santa Catarina (Brazil), but the Guaraní people who were part of the expedition took the silver objects back and spread the Sierra de Plata legend, and explained that it was possible to reach that fabulous land through the wide river to the south.

While the exact origin of the name "Rio de la Plata" is unknown, Italian explorer Sebastian Cabot's exploration between 1526 and 1529 is widely credited to have inspired such name due to his obtaining and collecting a variety of silver objects from the Guaraní tribes along the Paraguay river. The river received other names, such as "Mar Dulce", "Río de Solís", "Río de Santa María", and "Río Jordán", but "Río de La Plata" was the one that prevailed. In Italian and Venetian, Argentina (masculine argentino) means "(made) of silver, silver coloured", derived from the Latin "argentum" for silver.

The earliest description of the region by the word Argentina has been found on a Venetian map in 1536.

The Portuguese cartographer Lopo Homem made reference to the place as "Terra Argentea" in a 1554 map. The first mention of the name "Argentina" was in Martín del Barco Centenera's poem Argentina y conquista del Río de la Plata, con otros acaecimientos de los reinos del Perú, Tucumán y estado del Brasil, published in Spain in 1602.

Ten years later, in 1612, Ruy Díaz de Guzmán published the book Historia del descubrimiento, población, y conquista del Río de la Plata (History of the discovery, population, and conquest of the Río de la Plata), naming the territory discovered by Solís "Tierra Argentina" ("Land of Silver", "Silvery Land").

In 1776 the "Virreinato del Río de la Plata" (Viceroyalty of the Río de la Plata) was created, named after the river; it included present-day Argentina, Bolivia, Paraguay, Uruguay and Rio Grande do Sul.

== Independence of Argentina ==
The Spanish viceroy was ousted during the May Revolution, starting the Argentine War of Independence. The new government removed the "Viceroyalty" word from the name, renaming the territory the "Provincias Unidas del Río de la Plata" (United Provinces of the Río de la Plata). This denomination was ratified years later by the Assembly of Year XIII. The Congress of Tucumán, seeking a higher Argentine integration, used instead the name "Provincias Unidas de Sud América" (United Provinces of South America).

The name "Argentina" was mainly used among the high society, and in limited cases. The use became popular with the sanction of the second Argentine National Anthem, written by Vicente López y Planes. However, it was not widely used because it was not associated to the whole territory, but just to the Buenos Aires province. The Constitution of 1826 was sanctioned as the Constitución de la República Argentina. The other provinces rejected its high centralism, and the president Bernardino Rivadavia was deposed shortly after.

During the second government of Juan Manuel de Rosas, Confederación Argentina (Argentine Confederation) was the main name used for the young country, but others were also used, including República de la Confederación Argentina (Republic of the Argentine Confederation) and Federación Argentina (Argentine Federation). Justo José de Urquiza deposed Rosas in the battle of Caseros and called for a Constituent Assembly that would write the Constitution of Argentina of 1853. Buenos Aires did not accept it, and seceded from the Confederation as the State of Buenos Aires. For a decade, Buenos Aires and the Confederation existed as distinct administrative divisions. Buenos Aires rejoined the Confederation in 1860, after an amendment to the 1853 Constitution. The name was changed to Nación Argentina, though including a paragraph with the historical names as "equivalent and valid" denominations. Then on October 8, 1860, President Santiago Derqui decreed the official name to be República Argentina.

In common speech, the country is referred to as "la Argentina" (the Argentine) in Spanish, bypassing the noun in any of the above expressions ("the Argentine [land]", "the Argentine [Republic]", etc.).

== See also ==
- List of meanings of countries' names
