= Mutiny of Fontezuelas =

1815 rebellion in the United Provinces

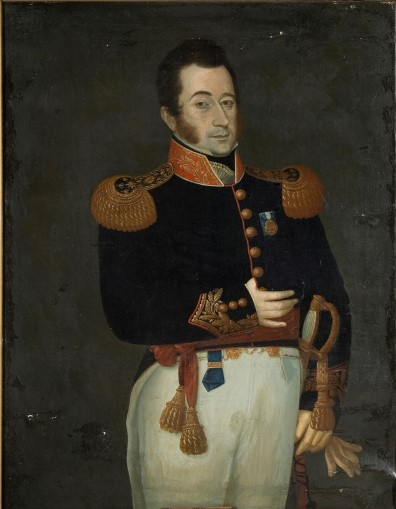
Ignacio Álvarez Thomas, leader of the Mutiny of Fontezuelas

The Mutiny of Fontezuelas (Note: Spanish: motín de Fontezuelas) was the rebellion of the army of the United Provinces of the Río de la Plata against Carlos María de Alvear, the supreme director, which took place on 3 April 1815 in Fontezuela, Partido de Pergamino. The army, composed of 1600 men and commanded by Ignacio Álvarez Thomas, had been ordered to march towards the Province of Santa Fe and fight the caudillo José Gervasio Artigas, within the framework of the Argentine Civil Wars; but they refused. The mutiny broke out while, in the surroundings of Arroyo del Medio, it became known that the army of Eustoquio Díaz Vélez, with which the army of Álvarez Thomas was supposed to converge, decided not to attack as well.
