= 1811 Provisional Statute =

The 1811 Provisional Statute, (Note: Spanish: Estatuto provisional de 1811) formally the Provisional Statute of the Superior Government of the United Provinces of the River Plate, in the Name of Lord Don Ferdinand VII, (Note: Spanish: Estatuto provisional del Gobierno Superior de las Provincias Unidas del Río de la Plata, á nombre del Señor Don Fernando VII) was the provisional governing statute of the United Provinces of the River Plate from 1811 to 1813, which formalised the government, defined its duty and provided for the convening of a general congress. It was adopted on 22 November 1811 by the First Triumvirate, once it had rejected the 1811 Organic Regulations, approved by the Junta Conservadora on 22 October 1811, which were never applied.

== Articles ==
=== Article 1 ===
The first article regulated the organisation of the Triumvirate. It provided that one of the triumvirs was to be replaced every six months on a rotating basis. Since Feliciano Chiclana, Manuel de Sarratea, and Juan José Paso were the first ones and had therefore all been appointed at the same time, they agreed that the first replacement would affect the last of them mentioned by the Junta Conservadora in the decree establishing the Triumvirate, namely Paso. The article also stipulated that the new triumvirs were to be elected by a General Assembly composed of the Cabildo of Buenos Aires, representatives from the cities of the United Provinces, and a considerable number of neighbours chosen by "the neighbourhood of this Capital [Buenos Aires]". It further provided that those elections would be governed by a future law, the drafting of which was entrusted to the Triumvirate. Regarding the presidency of the Triumvirate, the article provided that it was to be held in rotation by the longest-serving triumvir, except, logically, for the one serving as president at the time of the rotation. Finally, it addressed temporary absences, providing that they would be filled by the secretaries.

=== Article 2 ===
The second article provided that the government would not take measures concerning the most important affairs of the State, which, by their nature, could endanger the liberty and existence of the United Provinces, without the approval of the General Assembly mentioned in the previous article.

=== Article 3 ===
The third article stipulated that, once circumstances allowed it, the Triumvirate would convene a General Congress—not to be confused with the aforementioned General Assembly—before which both the triumvirs and the secretaries would answer for their actions in office. If, after eighteen months, the Congress had still not been opened, the Triumvirate would begin to be accountable to the General Assembly.

=== Article 4 ===
The fourth article emphasised the importance of the freedom of the press and individual security. It provided that the 26 October 1811 Decree on Freedom of Printing and the subsequent 23 November 1811 Decree on Individual Security were to be considered part of the Statute, and stipulated that the members of the government had to take an oath to uphold and enforce those decrees.

=== Article 5 ===
The fifth article declared that the judiciary was independent and was to be exercised by judicial authorities—at first, the Royal Audiencia of Buenos Aires, and later, the Chamber of Appeals—in accordance with the law. However, it also stated that the segundas suplicaciones (final appeals), which had previously been heard by the Council of the Indies in Madrid, would henceforth be decided by the Triumvirate and two additional citizens of the required probity and enlightenment, since Spain had fallen due to the French invasion.

=== Article 6 ===
The sixth article emphasised the duty of the Triumvirate to enforce the laws and to adopt any measures deemed necessary for the "defence and salvation of the homeland", depending on what the situation at any given moment required.

=== Article 7 ===
The seventh article provided that in the event of resignation, absence, or death of any secretary, the Triumvirate would appoint a replacement, and announce the appointment before the next meeting of the General Assembly.

=== Article 8 ===
The eighth article addressed several subjects. First, it stated that the official name of the Triumvirate was Provisional Superior Government of the United Provinces of the River Plate, in the name of Lord Don Ferdinand VII, and that its form of address as a governing body was Su Excelencia ("Your Excellency"), while the honorific title of each individual member was Vuestra Merced Don ("Your Grace Don"). Additionally, the article also reiterated that the present form (the powers of the government) would last until the opening of the Congress, when it would begin to be accountable to that institution.

=== Article 9 ===
The ninth and final article emphasised that any violation of the Statute would be considered an attack on civil liberty. It also stated that both the Triumvirate and the existing authorities had to take an oath to uphold its provisions, and that copies of both the Statute and the Decrees of Freedom of the Press and Individual Security were to be sent to every city to be publicly proclaimed by the authorities.
