= 1811 Organic Regulations =

The 1811 Organic Regulations, (Note: Spanish: Reglamento orgánico de 1811) formally the Regulation Establishing the Functions, Prerogatives and Duties of the Legislative, Executive and Judicial Powers, (Note: Spanish: Reglamento fijando las atribuciones, prerrogativas y deberes de los poderes Legislativo, Executivo y Judicial) were a provisional constitution and governing statute drafted by the Junta Conservadora, providing the legal framework for the separation of powers in the Provinces of the River Plate. The Junta Conservadora submitted the Organic Regulations to the First Triumvirate, but the latter rejected it and began drafting its own statute, which would later become known as the 1811 Provisional Statute. Because of this, the 1811 Organic Regulations were never implemented. The Triumvirate dissolved the Junta Conservadora after rejecting the document.

== Context ==
After the abduction of King Ferdinand VII of Spain by Emperor Napoleon I of France, the Spanish people led uprisings against the French forces and began creating juntas (boards or councils) to govern themselves, in the name of their captive monarch. These movements were influenced by Enlightenment and liberal ideas, such as popular sovereignty and democracy. The Junta of Seville became the most important one, and even managed to appoint a viceroy for the Viceroyalty of the River Plate, a Spanish territory in the Americas. However, it ceased to exist after a major Spanish defeat. It was replaced by a new organisation, the Council of Regency of Spain and the Indies, which was significantly more conservative.

The idea of self-government through the creation of juntas—in the absence of the King—became popular in Spanish America, with many creoles (descendants of Spanish born in the Americas) wanting to replace the viceregnal administrations with juntas. They supported their position with the principle of retroversion of sovereignty to the people, which held that, although the people—in this case, the Spanish Americans—had willingly ceded their sovereignty to the King, now that he was absent, sovereignty reverted to them so that they could choose how to govern themselves temporarily. In the River Plate, this argument was further reinforced by the fact that the Viceroy had been appointed not by the King, but by a provisional junta that had already been dissolved.

On 24–25 May 1810, the May Revolution in the River Plate dismissed the Viceroy and replaced him with a government junta. It was composed exclusively of people from Buenos Aires—as the Revolution had taken place there—so a circular requesting the rest of the cities to choose deputies was quickly sent. In the meantime, the Junta began governing nonetheless. It refused to recognise the authority of the Council of Regency and therefore engaged in a military conflict with the Spanish jurisdictions that did recognise it, such as the Viceroyalty of Peru and Montevideo. During this period, the Junta's measures were primarily influenced by Secretary Mariano Moreno and were considered radical.

On 18 December 1810, the deputies from the provinces arrived in Buenos Aires and joined the government, forming the Junta Grande (Big Junta). Morenism lost its majority and became a minor political force, while a moderate political agenda led by Cornelio Saavedra prevailed. Nevertheless, the Junta had to face significant military defeats—such as the Paraguay and the First Upper Peru campaigns—as well as the enormous economic cost of the war. Against this backdrop, the Cabildo of Buenos Aires urged the Junta to transfer the executive power to a smaller body, which it did. On 23 September 1811, the Junta Conservadora organised the First Triumvirate and granted it executive power, while remaining in charge of the legislative branch of the State. In the same decree, the Junta promised to draft a law in order to clearly distinguish between the powers of each branch of government. That law became known as the Organic Regulations of 1811. Although the Junta Conservadora was not as radical as the Primera Junta, the Regulations were clearly influenced by the ideologies of the Revolution.

== Content ==
=== Preamble ===
Firstly, the preamble justified the existence of the provisional governments. It stated that, although the Nation had ceded to the kings the power to govern it, in the event of a permanent absence or even a temporary absence, that power could revert to the Nation, allowing the people to reassume sovereignty and govern themselves, as happened after the abduction of Ferdinand VII. It continued by exemplifying that, just as no one doubts that someone has the right to defend himself in a dangerous situation when there is no magistrate capable of helping him, no one should question the right of a people to govern themselves in the absence of their legitimate sovereign. It also affirmed that, since the State was a moral person that came into existence through the association of individuals seeking to protect their security, it needed, in its situation of orphanhood (absence of the King), a public authority capable of ensuring that everyone complied with their duties towards the association.

The second half of the preamble justified the transfer of the executive functions from the Junta to the Triumvirate, and explained the reason behind the drafting of the Regulations. It addressed the fact that, according to the doctrine upheld by the Junta, any authority of the provinces of the River Plate needed to be recognised by the cities in order to be legitimate. It stated, therefore, that those cities had understood the necessity of the measure and had ratified the existence of the new government by sending the requested deputies, thereby claiming their respective role in the government. It further maintained that the Nation had both the right to establish its own government and the right to defend it, and consequently, the right to do whatever was necessary for its preservation. Avoiding anything that could bring about its ruin was, therefore, one of its fundamental duties. In that sense, the Junta stated in the preamble that the large number of deputies hindered unity of purpose and slowed down the government, thereby endangering its existence, and that these were problems that needed to be solved without depriving the cities of their right to exercise their sovereignty.

According to the preamble, the Junta considered that the best way to solve those problems, without denying the cities their right to exercise their sovereignty, was to draft these Regulations on the basis of the separation of powers—the document left the deputies with the responsibility of exercising the Legislative Power. It acknowledged that, in the absence of a National Congress, the Junta could not exercise a perfect representation of the sovereignty of the cities, but that did not mean that its representation was illegitimate, nor had it been before the separation of powers, because the provisional government responded to the urgent circumstance through which the State was passing. To illustrate its point, the preamble used an example similar to the previous one, namely that of a magistrate incapable of helping a citizen in immediate need of assistance. The preamble stated that the separation of powers provided by the Regulations was convenient for the common good, as it preserved the will of the cities by maintaining their deputies in the Legislative Power, and "placed a barrier against arbitrariness", by limiting the Executive Power. Finally, it provided that the Regulations would last until the Congress—when opened—passed a new resolution, or until the provinces modified the Regulations if deemed necessary.

=== Legislative Power ===
The first section was dedicated to the Legislature, namely the Junta itself. It provided that the deputies from the provinces who were already in the city of Buenos Aires—since they were part of the Junta Grande—were to constitute the Junta for the Preservation of the Sovereignty of Lord Don Ferdinand VII and the National Laws, insofar as the latter do not conflict with the supreme right to the civil liberty of the American peoples, (Note: Spanish: Junta Conservadora de la soberanía del señor Don Fernando Séptimo y de las leyes nacionales en cuanto no se oponen al derecho supremo de la libertad civil de los pueblos americanos) commonly referred to as the Junta Conservadora. (Note: Article 1, Section 1) It further provided that deputies from provinces arriving later in Buenos Aires were also to be incorporated into the Junta, (Note: Article 2, Section 1) and that the Junta would have a president whose office would rotate monthly among its members according to the order of their appointments. (Note: Article 3, Section 1)

Moreover, the section classified the declaration of war, the truce, the treaties of boundaries and commerce, the imposition of taxes, the creation of tribunals or new offices, and the appointment of members of the Executive Power in the event of death or resignation as matters falling within the jurisdiction of the Junta. (Note: Article 4, Section 1) It stated that the proper form of address for the Junta as an institution was "Your Highness", that it would hold meetings on Tuesdays and Fridays at the Fort of Buenos Aires, (Note: Article 5, Section 1) and that it was to attend and preside over the public celebrations of Saint Ferdinand's Day, the Reconquest, the Defence, the 25 May, etc. (Note: Article 6, Section 1) Finally, the section provided that the deputies could only be tried by internal commissions of the Junta, (Note: Article 7, Section 1) and that Junta itself would cease to exist once a General Congress had opened. (Note: Article 8, Section 1)

=== Executive Power ===
The second section emphasised the independence of the Triumvirate (Executive Power) and stated that it was composed of the individuals named in the decree creating it (Feliciano Chiclana, Manuel de Sarratea and Juan José de Paso). (Note: Article 1, Section 2) It provided that its objectves were the organisation of the armies, the maintenance of public order, the preservation of civil liberty, the raising and expenditure of public funds, the enforcement of the laws, and the protection of life and property. (Note: Article 2, Section 2) Furthermore, the section stated that the Executive was to appoint all military and civilian officers of the branches of the public administration, abolish unnecessary offices, and carry the reforms conducive to the common good and compatible with the existing system of administration. (Note: Article 3, Section 2)

It further provided that the Executive was to adopt the necessary measures for the assembly of the deputies, the election of those still outstanding, and the holding of the Congress as soon as possible, to the extent permitted by the prevailing circumstances; the Junta Conservadora was to assist in those duties. (Note: Article 4, Section 2) The section also stipulated that the appointment of the secretaries and the review of their public conduct fell within the jurisdiction of the Executive, (Note: Article 5, Section 2) and that their wages should be reduced to 2000 pesos. (Note: Article 4, Section 2) It prohibited relatives of members of the Executive within the third degree of consanguinity or affinity from being appointed secretaries or holding public office without the prior consultation and approval of the Junta. (Note: Article 6, Section 2)

The second section also prescribed the independence of the Judicial Power by prohibiting the Executive from intervening in judicial matters, assuming jurisdiction over pending or finally adjudicated cases, reopening proceedings, altering the administration of justice, or hearing causes involving superior or inferior magistrates, subordinate judges, or other public officials, as jurisdiction over such matters was reserved to the Royal Audiencia of Buenos Aires or to a commission appointed by the Junta Conservadora. (Note: Article 7, Section 2) It also provided that, notwithstanding the separation of powers, the Executive had jurisdiction over cases of smuggling and all cases concerning the recovery of sums owed under customs duties or other regulations. All other cases were to be referred to the Royal Audiencia, and judgements against the Treasury were not to be enforced without prior consultation with the Executive, which could suspend payment if it was incompatible with other purposes considered more urgent and conducive to the common good. (Note: Article 8, Section 2)

The section further provided that the Executive could not detain an individual for more than forty-eight hours, within which period the detainee had to be brought before the competent judge together with the record of the proceedings. Any violation of this provision was to be regarded as an attack on the liberty of citizens, and anyone could, in such a case, submit a complaint to the Junta Conservadora. (Note: Article 9, Section 2) The Executive was to appoint a judicial commission of three citizens of integrity and learning to hear each segunda suplicación (final appeal), which had previously been heard by the Council of the Indies. (Note: Article 10, Section 2) The form of address of the Executive was to be Excelencia ("Excellency") and it was to enjoy the same military honours previously accorded to the Primera Junta and the Junta Grande. (Note: Article 11, Section 2) The presidency of the Executive (Triumvirate) was to rotate among its members every four months according to the order of their appointments. (Note: Article 12, Section 2) Finally, the second section provided that the authority of the Executive was provisional and would last for one year, (Note: Article 14, Section 2) and that it was accountable to the Junta Conservadora. (Note: Article 13, Section 2)

=== Judicial Power ===
The third section of the Regulations emphasised the independence of the Judiciary and its sole purpose of judging the citizens, (Note: Article 1, Section 3) and provided that it had to operate within the framework of the already existing laws. (Note: Article 2, Section 3) The section also stated that the Judicial Power was responsible for any attempt, whether in substance or in form, against the liberty and security of the subjects. (Note: Article 3, Section 3) Finally, it provided that the Regulations were to remain in force until the Congress drafted its own distinction among the branches of the government, (Note: Article 4, Section 3) and the Junta reserved the right to explain the doubts regarding the effective application of the articles. (Note: Article 5, Section 3)
