= La Argentina (poem) =

Book by Martín del Barco Centenera

Argentina y conquista del Río de la Plata, con otros acaecimientos de los reinos del Perú, Tucumán y estado del Brasil
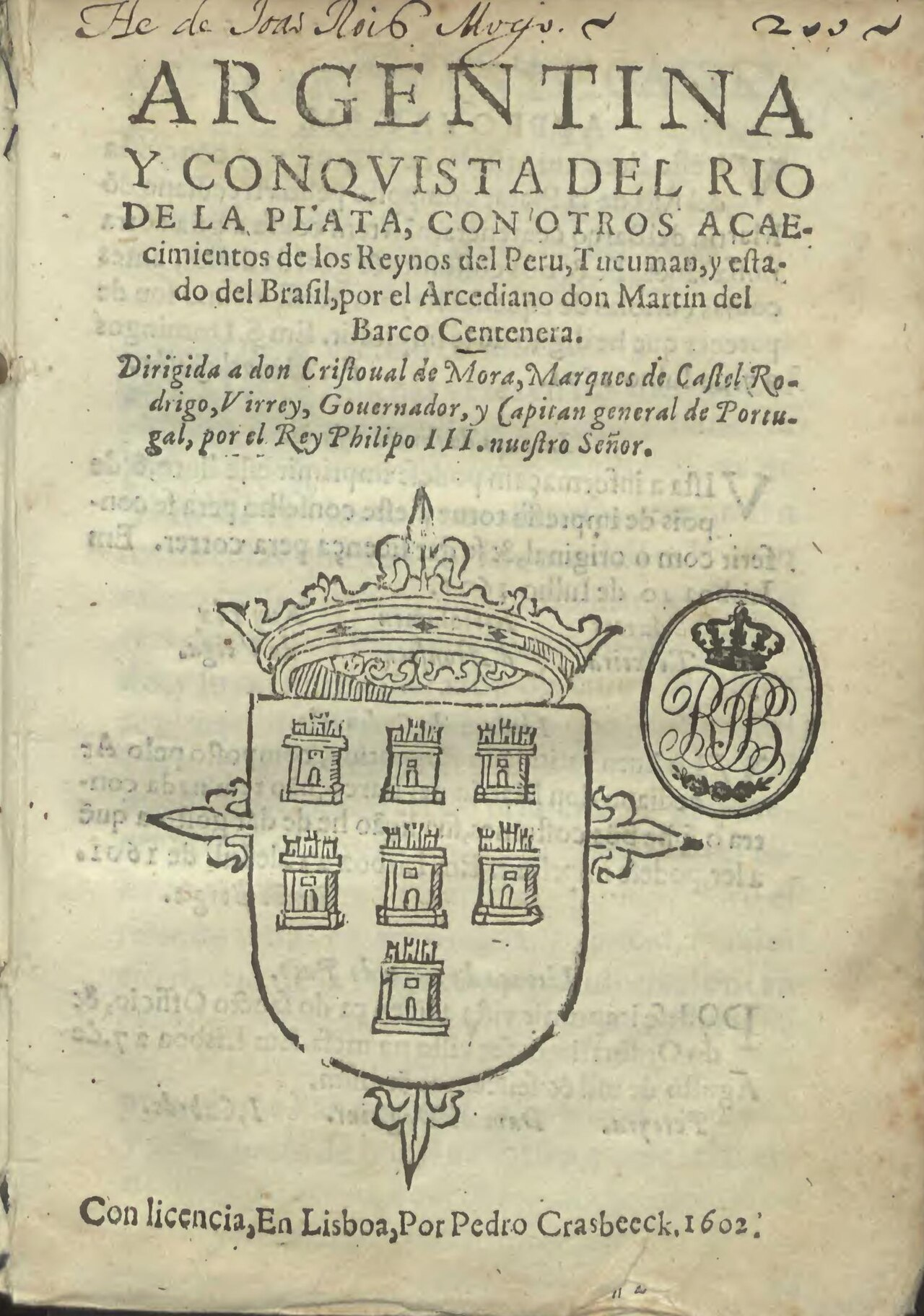
- Author: Martín del Barco Centenera
- Language: Spanish
- Publisher: Pieter van Craesbeeck
- Publication date: 1602
- Publication place: Viceroyalty of Peru (modern Argentina); Lisbon (1st edition)

La Argentina is a 1602 poem written by Martín del Barco Centenera. The full name is Argentina y conquista del Río de la Plata, con otros acaecimientos de los reinos del Perú, Tucumán y estado del Brasil (Spanish: Argentina and conquest of the Río de la Plata, with other events from the kingdoms of Peru, Tucuman and the state of Brazil).

Martín del Barco Centenera was a priest who arrived to the Río de la Plata Basin along with the adelantado Juan Ortiz de Zárate. He wandered through the region for twenty-four years, narrating a poem with his experiences. The poem mixes both real events and imaginative tales, such as human-shaped fishes. The work, with more than ten thousand verses divided in twenty-four canticles, was published in Lisbon in 1602.

The poem is known for being one of the earliest usages of the name of Argentina.

== Bibliography ==
- Abad de Santillán, Diego. Historia Argentina (in Spanish). Buenos Aires: TEA (Tipográfica Editora Argentina). p. 287.
