= Renato Cárdenas =

Chilean historian and writer (1949–2022)

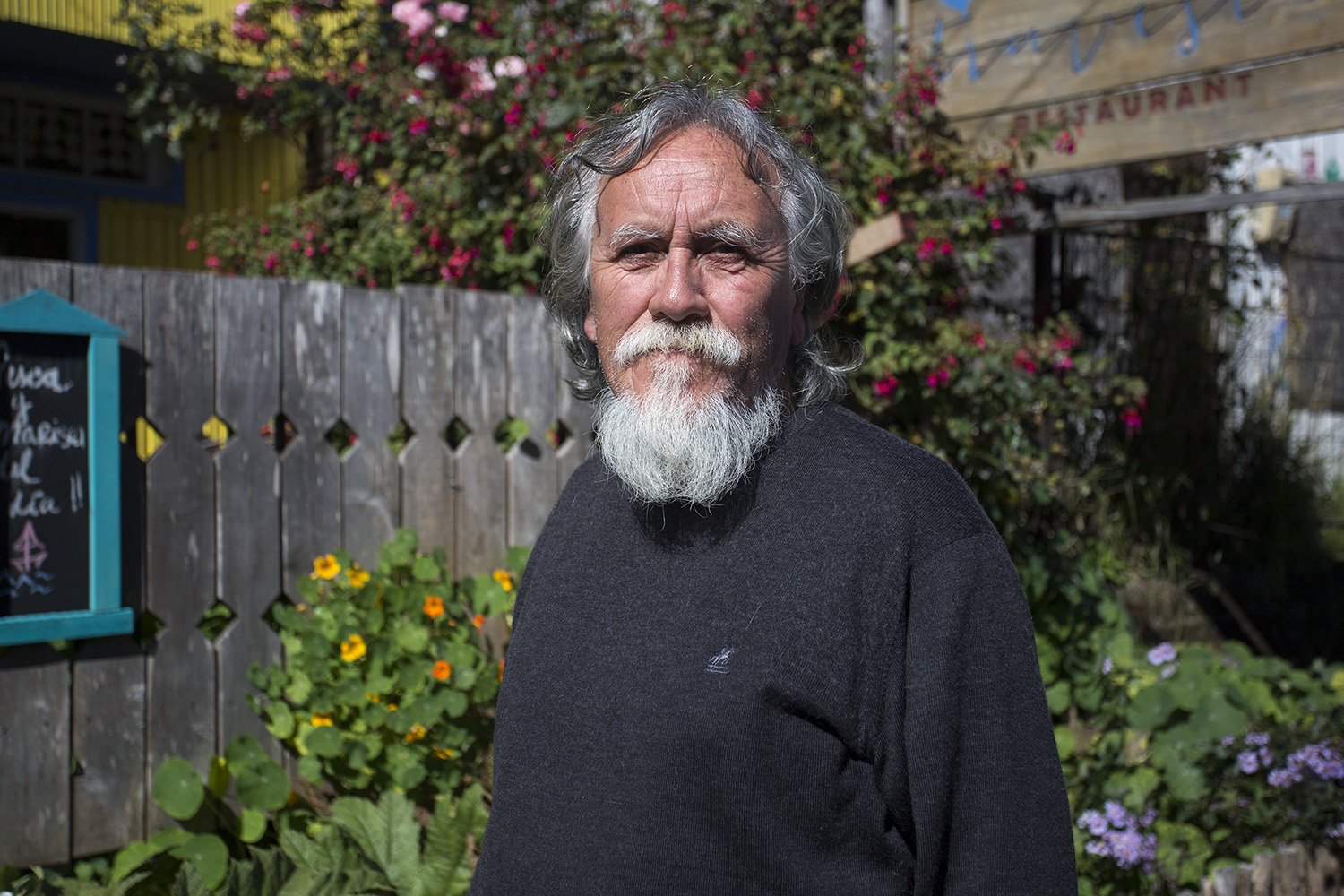
- Born: 2 August 1949
- Died: 14 April 2022 (aged 72)
- Occupation: Poet

Academic background
- Education: University of Chile

Renato Cárdenas Álvarez (Calen, Dalcahue, 2 August 1949 - Ancud, 14 April 2022) was a Chilean historian, writer, poet and teacher. He was part of the cultural movement Taller Literario Aumen, of which he was one of the founders together with Carlos Trujillo in 1975.

Cárdenas studied pedagogy in the University of Chile and the Escuela de Bellas Artes in Valparaíso. Later he obtained a scholarship to study communication at London University. He was member of the Academia Chilena de la Lengua and academic director of the Archivo Bibliográfico y Documental de Chiloé.
