= Martín del Barco Centenera =

Spanish explorer

Martín del Barco Centenera (1535 – c. 1602) was a Spanish cleric, explorer and author.

A street in the city of Buenos Aires, Argentina, is named after him.

== Life ==
Born 1535 at Logrosán, in the Diocese of Plasencia in Extremadura region (Spain); died c. 1602. He became a secular priest and in 1572 accompanied, as chaplain, the expedition of Juan Ortiz de Zárate to the Rio de La Plata in South America. For twenty-four years he followed the vicissitudes of Spanish exploration in the Argentine with undaunted courage.

Centenera was made archdeacon of the church of Paraguay. In 1582 he went to Lima and acted as secretary to the third council held in that city.

He returned to Europe, where he finished his poetical work, known as "La Argentina", which he dedicated to the Viceroy of Portugal (for the Habsburg king Philip III of Spain). It appeared in 1602. Soon after, del Barco died.

== Work ==
Its historical value is considerable. He describes nearly a quarter of a century of Spanish efforts in Argentina and adjacent countries, of which he was mostly an eyewitness, and thus fills a considerable blank in our knowledge of the history of that period, otherwise but little known.

He also alludes to the English piracies committed by Francis Drake and Thomas Cavendish, and to events of importance in Peru during the administration of the Viceroy Toledo. Several of the violent earthquakes of the time are also mentioned and described, though not always with correctness in regard to dates.
