= Belgrano =

Belgrano may refer to:

== People ==
- Joaquín Belgrano (1773–1848), an Argentine patriot
- José Denis Belgrano (1844–1917), Spanish painter
- Joseph Belgrano (1762–1823), Argentine military officer and politician, brother of Manuel
- Manuel Belgrano (1770–1820), General Belgrano, Argentine politician and military leader
- Mario Belgrano (1884–1947), Argentine historian

== Places ==
=== Argentina ===
- Belgrano, Buenos Aires, a neighbourhood of Buenos Aires
- Barrio Belgrano, Rosario, a neighbourhood of Rosario, Santa Fe Province
- Belgrano (Buenos Aires Underground), a station on the Buenos Aires Underground
- Belgrano River

==== Departments ====
- Belgrano Department, San Luis
- Belgrano Department, Santa Fe
- Belgrano Department, Santiago del Estero
- Doctor Manuel Belgrano Department, Jujuy Province

=== Elsewhere ===
- Belgrano I Base, an Argentine base in Antarctica
  - Belgrano II Base
  - Belgrano III Base
- Belgrano, Wales, a United Kingdom location

== Ships ==
- Belgrano (1872 ship), a French sail and steam liner
- ARA General Belgrano (C-4), an Argentine Navy light cruiser sunk during the Falklands War
- ARA General Belgrano (1896), an Argentine Giuseppe Garibaldi-class cruiser

== Sports ==
- Club Atlético Belgrano, an Argentine football club
- Defensores de Belgrano, Argentine football club
- General Belgrano de Santa Rosa, an Argentine football club
- Belgrano Athletic Club, an Argentine rugby club
- Club Manuel Belgrano, an Argentine rugby union and field hockey club

== Other uses ==
- Belgrano (film), a 2010 Argentine film
- Plan Belgrano, 2015 infrastructure plan in Argentina
- University of Belgrano, a private university in the Belgrano district, Buenos Aires, Argentina
- 2808 Belgrano, a minor planet

== See also ==
- General Belgrano (disambiguation)
