= Alejo Castex =

- Born: July 17, 1766; Buenos Aires, Argentina
- Died: September 17, 1841 (aged 75); Buenos Aires
- Other name: Alejo Castex y Delgado
- Occupations: Lawyer, politician, soldier
- Spouse: María Luisa Estefanía Campos y López Camelo
- Children: Paula, Manuel, Eusebio, María Micaela, Josefa Ceferina, Rufino, María de la Paz Ildefonsa, Pedro Joseph Francisco, Juan Bonifacio, María Matilde Josepha Bernabela, Josefa Genara and Juan Isidro Castex Campos
- Parent(s): Francisco Castex and Paula Hilaria Delgado y Sánchez de Velasco

Alejo Castex was a distinguished lawmaker of the Viceroyalty of the Río de la Plata and of the United Provinces, where he was president of the Supreme Court (Supremo Tribunal de Justicia) and also a congressman.

== Biography ==
Born in Buenos Aires on 17 July 1766, he was the son of a Spanish captain of militias, Francisco Castex, and of Paula Hilaria Delgado y Sánchez de Velasco, native of Buenos Aires. Castex had at least one brother, Vicente José Castex y Delgado.

After studies in the Real Colegio de San Carlos, on 23 July 1786 he earned a degree in law at the University of Saint Francis Xavier of Chuquisaca.

=== Start of his career ===
Back in Buenos Aires, he joined the Royal Audiencia and in April 1789, he was accepted as a lawyer by the tribunal.

On 20 July 1800 he married María Luisa Estefanía Campos y López Camelo (1772–1851) at the Buenos Aires Metropolitan Cathedral, daughter of Juan Esteban Ambrosio de Campos y Rodríguez (1727–1810) and María Josefa López Camelo, with whom he had twelve children: Paula (1803–1843), Manuel de la Santísima Trinidad (1804-1804), Eusebio Alejo (1805–1872), Josefa Ceferina (1806–1895), María Micaela (1807-?), Rufino, María de la Paz Ildefonsa (1812-?), Pedro Joseph Francisco (1813-?), Juan Bonifacio (1815-?), María Matilde Josepha Bernabela (1817-?), Josefa Genara (1808–1900)and Juan Isidro Castex Campos (1819–1889).

=== British invasions and independence ===
After the reconquest of Buenos Aires after the British invasions of the Río de la Plata in 1806, Castex joined the Regiment of Patricians with the rank of captain. On 31 May 1807 he received from Santiago de Liniers the rank of lieutenant colonel and given command of the Migueletes squadron, which became known as the "Castex Migueletes", and took part on the defense of Buenos Aires at the second British invasion.

In 1809 he replaced his previous superior Francisco Bruno de Rivarola as council to the Royal Tribunal. At the Cabildo of 22 May 1810, he voted along with Juan Nepomuceno Solá, who proposed to substitute the Viceroy and that the Buenos Aires Cabildo take control of the government until such time a congress of representatives to the Viceroyalty of the Río de la Plata could be convened.

On 27 May he replaced Manuel Belgrano as secretary of the Commerce Consulate of Buenos Aires, as the former became a member of the Primera Junta.

Castex was a representative for Catamarca Province to the assembly gathered in 1812 and dissolved by the First Triumvirate.

In 1813 he became acting secretary to the Supreme Court of Argentina, with the legal reforms instituted by the Asamblea del Año XIII.

=== Appellate court ===
On the same year he served as council to the Appellate court. On 9 December 1814 he ended his term as secretary to the Commerce Consulate.

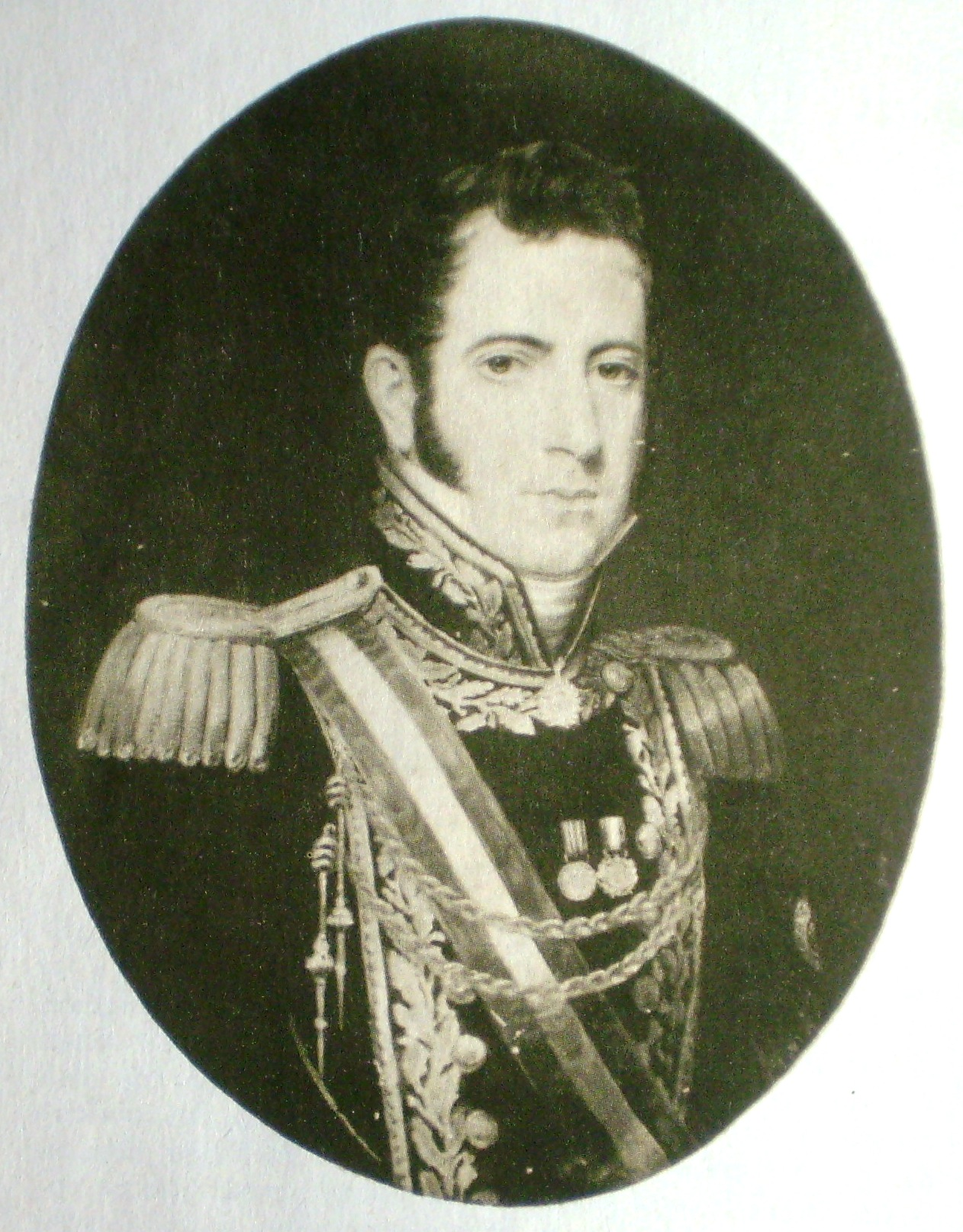
Carlos María de Alvear.

On 16 January 1815 he was named as member of the new law School, "Academia teórico-práctica de jurisprudencia de Buenos Aires", presided by Manuel Antonio Castro.

On 2 March 1815 he became a member of the Appellate Court — which replaced the Real Audiencia de Buenos Aires — under the direction of Miguel Mariano de Villegas.

On 20 April of the same year the administration of Carlos María de Alvear fell, after the rebellion of colonel Ignacio Álvarez Thomas, chief of the army sent against José Artigas, the opposition of the interior of the country, and the lack of support in Buenos Aires.

On 23 April the Appellate Court, through Castex and Tagle initiated a process for excesses in handling the public administration, by order of the Cabildo, against Agustín José Donado, Gervasio Posadas, Juan Larrea, Nicolás Herrera, and Elías Galván among others, all adherents of the recently deposed regime. The accused suffered the loss of their property and exile.

Castex took part in the writing of the instruction Project to the representatives of the Provincias Unidas del Río de la Plata to the Congress of Tucumán, which established Argentina's independence from Spain in 1816.

=== Mission to Santa Fe ===
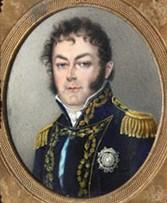
Juan Martín de Pueyrredón.

Once Juan Martín de Pueyrredón was elected by Congress to be the new Supreme Director of the United Provinces of the Río de la Plata, Castex was asked on 31 August 1816 along with Miguel Mariano de Villegas and Antonio Pósiga to represent before the government of Santa Fe Province, invaded on 12 July of the same year by colonel Eustaquio Díaz Vélez, to reach an agreement on the cessation of hostilities: "authorized to agree with the chief of said territory, the transaction of differences that sadly exist between both territories".

On 27 August, Castex met with Santa Fe's governor, Mariano Vera, who set a condition for allowing the Buenos Aires army to retreat unopposed, the laying down of arms, which Castex did not agree to and ended his mandate there.

=== Secretary and Rivadavia's presidency ===
In 1821, during the government of Martín Rodríguez, he was named judge at the Consulado de Comercio, Army and Navy Auditor and in December, Congress Representative for Buenos Aires.

He became president of the Supreme Court and had a major role in the discussions in Congress in Buenos Aires, about the ecclesiastic reforms proposed by president Bernardino Rivadavia, him being one of his political opponents, along with Tomas Manuel de Anchorena, Esteban Agustín Gazcón, Pedro Alcántara de Somellera and José Miguel Díaz Vélez.

Between 1825 and 1827 Castex acted as representative to the General Congress of 1824. He voted in favor of electing Rivadavia as president of Argentina, and signed the Constitution of 1826 as representative of the city of Buenos Aires.

=== Last years ===
he worked as Inspector general of Customs, then retired to his farm in Baradero Partido. Governor Rosas, who had served under him in the Migueletes battalion, suspended the payment of his pension as ex-president of the Supreme Court as being on the opposing Unitarian Party.

He died in Buenos Aires on 17 September 1841. A street in the Palermo neighborhood in his city of birth carries his name.
