= General Belgrano =

General Belgrano originally refers to:

- Manuel Belgrano (1770–1820), Argentine economist, politician and military leader

General Belgrano may also refer to:

== Places ==
- General Belgrano, Buenos Aires, a city in the Buenos Aires Province, Argentina
- General Belgrano Partido, a district of Buenos Aires Province, Argentina
- General Manuel Belgrano, a settlement in Formosa Province, Argentina
- Pueblo General Belgrano, a village and municipality in Entre Ríos Province, Argentina
- Villa General Belgrano, a village in Córdoba Province, Argentina

== Ships ==
- ARA General Belgrano, an Argentine Navy light cruiser, sunk in the Falklands War
- ARA General Belgrano (1896), an Argentine Navy Giuseppe Garibaldi-class cruiser

== Other uses ==
- General Belgrano Bridge, a road bridge in Argentina
- General Manuel Belgrano Railway, one of the main railway lines in Argentina
- General Belgrano de Santa Rosa, an Argentine football club from La Pampa Province

== See also ==
- Belgrano (disambiguation)
- General Belgrano Department (disambiguation)
- Belgrano II Base, Antarctica
- List of ships named ARA General Belgrano
