= Yatasto relay =

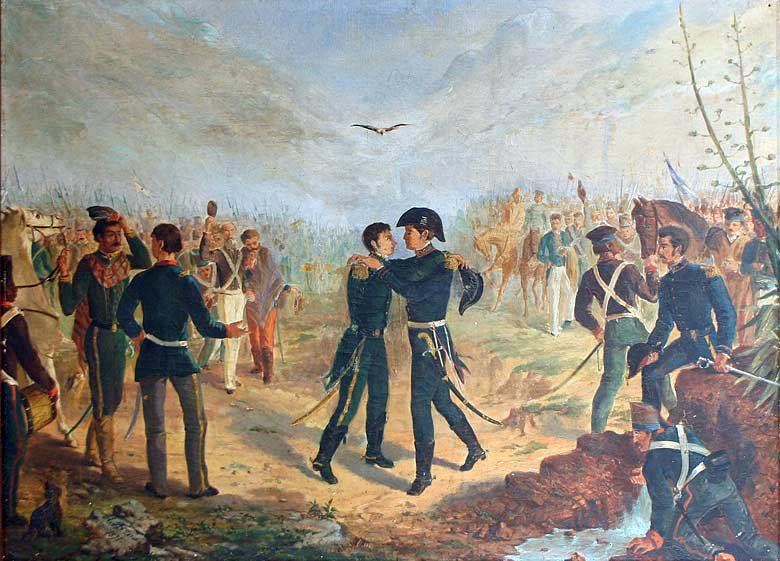
- Meeting of Manuel Belgrano and José de San Martín at Yatasto
- Date: January 1814
- Location: Yatasto relay, Salta Province
- Participants: Manuel Belgrano, José de San Martín and the Army of the North
- Outcome: Manuel Belgrano hands the command of the Army of the North to José de San Martín

The Yatasto relay (Spanish: Posta de Yatasto) was the handover of the command of the Army of the North by Manuel Belgrano to José de San Martín, in January 1814, during the Argentine War of Independence. It is named after the Yatasto relay, a horse relay at the modern Salta Province, but modern historians consider it could have taken place elsewhere.

== Context ==
Buenos Aires, a colony city of Spain in South America, ousted the Spanish viceroy in the 1810 May Revolution and began the Argentine War of Independence, sending armies to other areas still loyal to the Spanish monarchy. One of those areas was the Upper Peru (modern Bolivia), but Manuel Belgrano prevented the royalist armies from marching to Buenos Aires with his victories at Tucumán and Salta. However, he was defeated when he tried to counter-attack, at Vilcapugio and Ayohuma.

José de San Martín, Carlos María de Alvear and other veterans of the Peninsular War reinforced the armies of Buenos Aires. They influenced the local politics, causing the Revolution of October 8, 1812. San Martín had a military victory at the Battle of San Lorenzo against a raid from Montevideo. When Belgrano was defeated, San Martín was appointed his successor as the commander of the Army of the North. Historian Bartolomé Mitre considers it the result of a plot by Alvear, who sought to remove San Martín from the politics of Buenos Aires by sending him to a distant mission. Later historians as Norberto Galasso consider instead that, despite the dangers, heading that army was an honour, pointing that Alvear sought to do so at a later point. Juan Canter points as well that the mailings of the supreme director Gervasio Antonio de Posadas to San Martín were highly respectful.

== Meeting ==
San Martín left Buenos Aires in December, 1813. He had order to relieve Belgrano and send him back to the city, to be judged for the defeats in the Upper Peru. They knew each other before the meeting by mailing each other, with the intermediation of the Spanish José Milá de la Roca. Both of them shared their rejection to absolutism and belonged to the faction of the late Mariano Moreno.

It is widely considered that they met at the Yatasto relay, to the point that the event is named after the place. Portraits and other art allusions use that name as well. However, historian Julio Arturo Benencia considers that the meeting could have taken place at the "Algarrobos" relay, two leagues to the west of Yatasto. The exact date in unclear as well, and could have been at either January 30 or January 17.

Initially, San Martín resisted the instructions related to Belgrano: he considered that he was the best military leader in the army, and that his departure would have negative effects on the morale of the troops. Posadas insisted two months later, and Belgrano left the army. As his health was delicate, he did not return to Buenos Aires, moving instead to Cordoba to await the news there.

After leaving, Belgrano wrote again to San Martín, advising him to strictly abide to the local religious customs. José de San Martín was partially agnostic, and Belgrano feared that the royalists may use this as propaganda against him, as it was done before against Juan José Castelli during the ill-fated first Upper Peru campaign.

== Aftermath ==
Manuel Belgrano finally stayed in Luján to await the trial, and wrote his autobiography during that time. All charges against him were dismissed a short time later, as nobody formulated a definite accusation. Then, he was sent to a diplomatic mission to Europe.

San Martín stayed only a couple of months in the Army of the North. He considered that guerrilla warfare was a better option to face the royalists, and entrusted Martín Miguel de Güemes to direct the operations in Salta, while the Army of the North stayed in Tucumán. San Martín would move later to Mendoza, where he raised the Army of the Andes with Chilean expatriates. The successful crossing of the Andes allowed San Martín to avoid the harsh terrain of the Upper Peru and attack Lima by sea.

== Bibliography ==
- Galasso, Norberto (2009). Seamos libres y lo demás no importa nada. Buenos Aires: Colihue. ISBN 978-950-581-779-5.
- Luna, Félix (2004). Grandes protagonistas de la Historia Argentina: Manuel Belgrano (in Spanish). Buenos Aires: Grupo Editorial Planeta. ISBN 950-49-1247-8.
