= Mario Belgrano =

Argentine historian

Mario Belgrano (April 7, 1884 in Paris – 1947 in Buenos Aires) was an Argentine historian.

His parents were Juan Carlos Belgrano Martínez and Gregoria Flora "Florita" Vega Belgrano y Belgrano, and his brothers were Manuel Belgrano Vega, Néstor Belgrano Vega and Mario Belgrano Vega. He got married with Blanca Cigorraga Pondal on May 15, 1919, and his sons were Mario Carlos Belgrano Cigorraga, Miguel Manuel Belgrano Cigorraga and Blanca Flora Belgrano Cigorraga.

He wrote books about his relative the 19th century general Manuel Belgrano. He worked at the National Academy of History of Argentina and the Belgranian National Institute.

== Works ==
- Belgrano - 1927
- La Francia y la monarquía en el Plata (1818-1920) - 1933
- Rivadavia y sus gestiones diplomaticas con España (1815-1820) - 1933
- Contribuciones para el estudio de la historia de América - 1941
- El nuevo estado del Portugal
- Manuel Belgrano: los ideales de la patria
- La política externa con los Estados de Europa (1813-1816)
- Biografía del general Juan O'Brien : 1786-1861 : guerrero de la independencia - 1938
- Historia de Belgrano - 1944
