= Joaquín Belgrano =

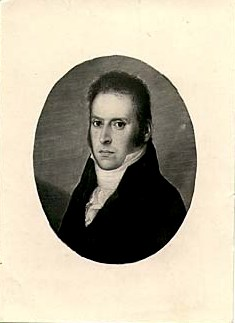

Alcalde of Buenos Aires
- In office 1813–1814
- Preceded by: ?
- Succeeded by: ?

Personal details
- Born: Joaquín Cayetano Lorenzo Belgrano González; 1773 Buenos Aires, Argentina
- Died: 1848 (aged 74–75) Buenos Aires, Argentina
- Resting place: La Recoleta Cemetery
- Spouse: Catalina Melián y Correa
- Occupation: Politician merchant
- Profession: jurist

Military service
- Allegiance: Spain-until 1810 (Argentina) United Provinces of the River Plate
- Years of service: 1806–1810
- Commands: 2° batallón del Regimiento de Milicia Pasiva
- Battles/wars: British invasions of the River Plate; May Revolution

Joaquín Belgrano (1773–1848) was an Argentine patriot, who participated in the defense of Buenos Aires against the British, and who took part in the May Revolution, as one of the neighbors attending the Cabildo Abierto of May 22, 1810. He was one of Manuel Belgrano's brothers.

== Biography ==
He was born in Buenos Aires, son of Domingo Belgrano and María Josefa González Casero. He was married to Catalina María Marcelina Melián y Correa, daughter of Antonio Melián Betancour, born in Seville, and María Josefa Correa Lescano, belonging to a Creole family of Buenos Aires.

Joaquín Belgrano completed his secondary education at the Royal College of San Carlos, and was possibly graduated in law in Chuquisaca. He began his career in 1790 as a customs employee in the Aduana of Buenos Aires. In 1804, he was appointed as Royal Honorary Officer, by the viceregal authorities. In addition to taking part in the May Revolution, he was one of the editors of the Argentine Constitution of 1826.

He served as mayor of first vote in 1813, and as second in 1820. He also served as judge of peace of Monserrat and as deputy of the town of San José de Flores.
