= Autobiography of Manuel Belgrano =

1814 book

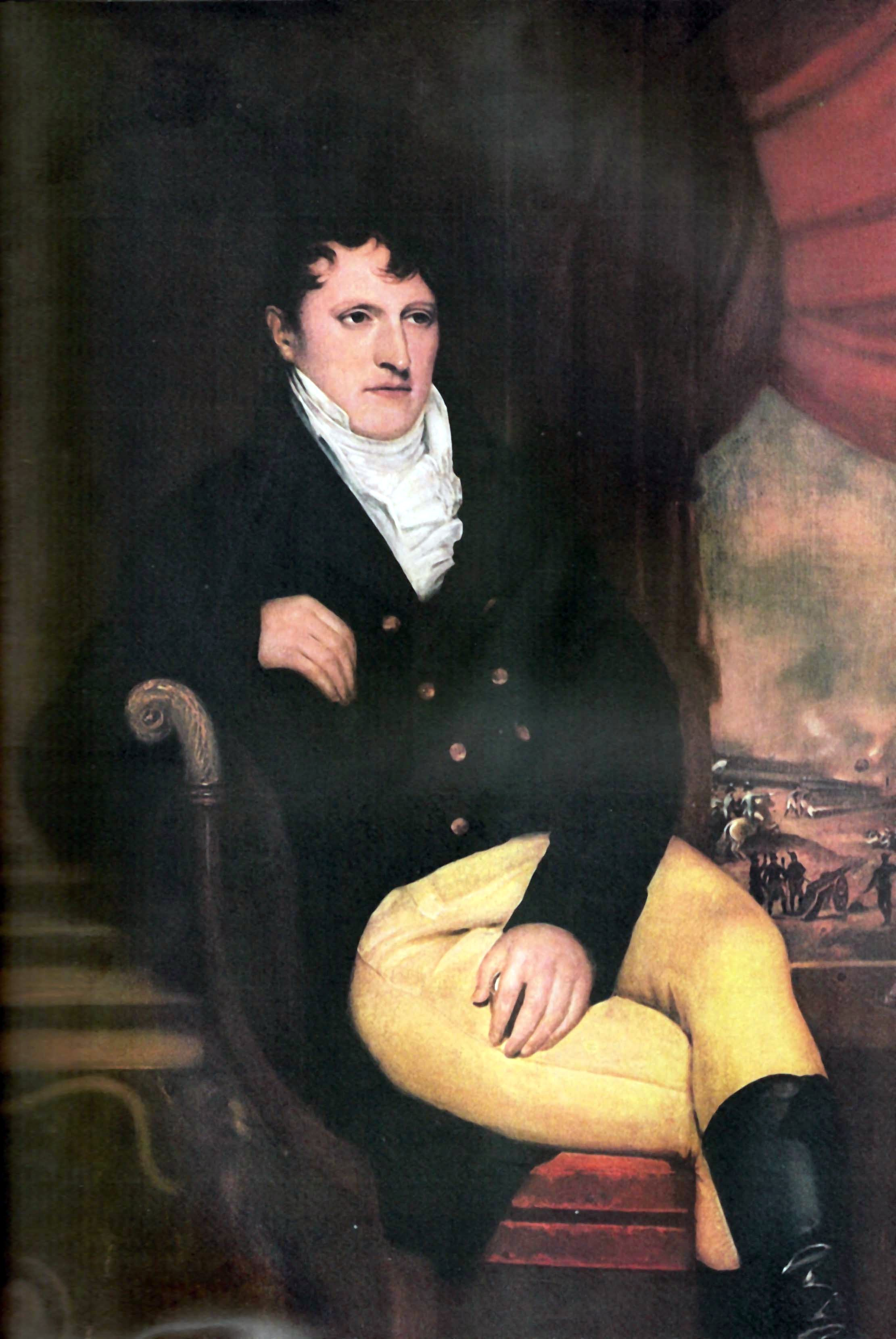
Manuel Belgrano.

The autobiography of Manuel Belgrano (full name in Spanish: "Autobiografía del General Don Juan Manuel Belgrano, que comprende desde sus primeros años (1770) hasta la Revolución del 25 de mayo") was written in 1814. It is part of his Memories and it was first published by Bartolomé Mitre in 1877 as part of the book Historia de Belgrano y de la Independencia Argentina. The second part of the Memories deals with the Paraguay campaign and the third and last with the Battle of Tucumán, being included at the Memorias Póstumas of José María Paz in 1855.

In this writing Belgrano described the frustration he experienced because of the constant resistance from the Spanish monarchy to the liberal changes he promoted from the Commerce Consulate of Buenos Aires. He also regretted the attitude of most merchants, which he considered were more interested in getting high profits than in the prosperity of the land. However, Belgrano did not support independentism by then, and during the British invasions he supported the Spanish monarchy. His perspective changed with the invasion of Spain by France during the Peninsular War, and Belgrano deemed such opportunity as a divine intervention. From that point on, all his actions, from the support to Carlotism to the defense of Santiago de Liniers, were motivated by the prosperity and independence of the local population.

== Bibliography ==
- Gelman, Jorge; Raúl Fradkin (2010). Doscientos años pensando la Revolución de Mayo. Buenos Aires: Sudamericana. p. 69. ISBN 978-950-07-3179-9.
