= Parish Nuestra Señora de Montserrat (Buenos Aires) =

Church building in Buenos Aires, Argentina

Parroquia Nuestra Señora de Montserrat
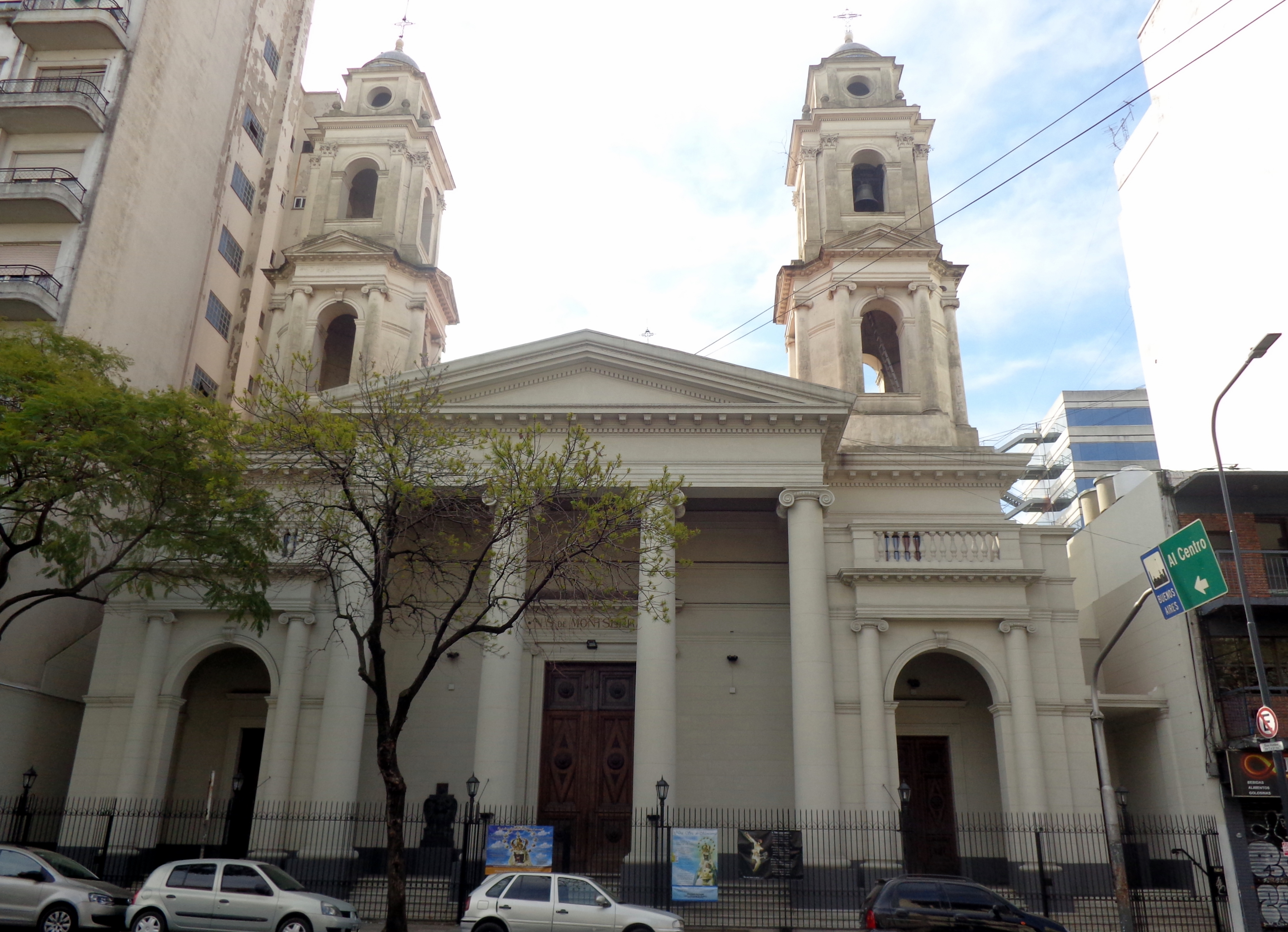
- current facade

Religion
- Rite: Catholic
- Patron: Virgin of Montserrat

Location
- Location: Belgrano 1151, Monserrat, Buenos Aires
- State: Argentina
- Country: Argentina
- Interactive map of Parroquia Nuestra Señora de Montserrat
- Coordinates: 34.6114°S 58.3810°W

Architecture
- Architects: Pablo Scolpini; Manuel Raffo
- Style: Neoclassicism
- Completed: 1865

The Parish Church of Nuestra Señora de Montserrat is a Roman Catholic church in the autonomous city of Buenos Aires.

== History ==
The church of Nuestra Señora de Montserrat, known as the church of the Catalans, was established in the 18th century. The first recorded baptism is dated January 12, 1770, and belongs to the child Manuel Benito Casa de Baie, son of Mariano Casa de Baie, born in Catalonia, and Ana Durán, born in Buenos Aires. The parish of Montserrat was mostly attended by faithful of humble origin, although weddings and baptisms of the patrician families of Buenos Aires were also held, including the wedding of Joseph Gregorio Belgrano with Casiana Cabral, members of the most distinguished families of the city.

Its first priest was Francisco Antonio de Suero, who served until 1791, being replaced by Juan Nepomuceno Solá, priest of the parish until 1819. Another distinguished priest was Manuel Velarde, who served in the parish of Montserrat from 1857 to 1870.

The original facade was the work of the Italian architect Antonio Masella. The current view of the temple was commissioned to the architects Pablo Scolpini and Manuel Raffo, having its inauguration on September 10, 1865.
