= Yatasto relay (place) =

Coordinates: 25°35′24″S 64°56′59″W

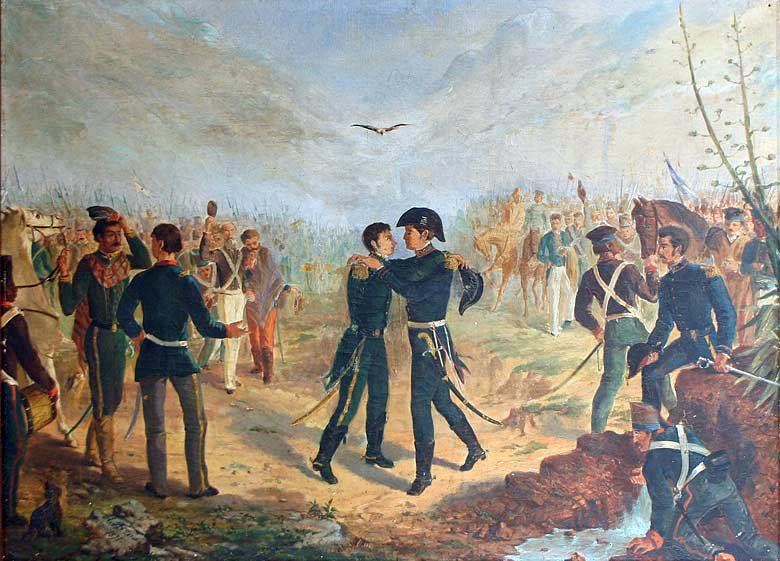
Meeting of Manuel Belgrano and José de San Martín at the Posta de Yatasto

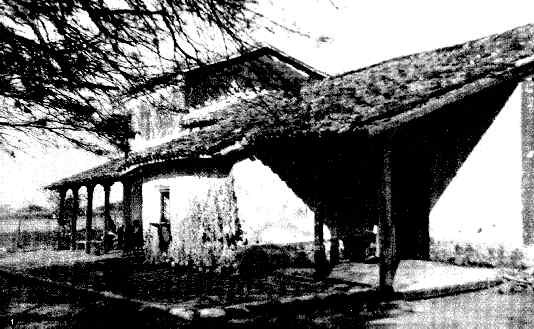
The Posta de Yatasto

The Posta de Yatasto is an estate located near San José de Metán, Salta Province, Argentina. It is known for the historical meetings that took place at the site during the Argentine War of Independence, and was designated a National Monument of Argentina in 1942.

== History ==
This estate was built during colonial times, and it was used by people traveling between Buenos Aires and the Upper Peru, to rest and acquire fresh horses, if needed. The original name could have been either "Yatasto", "Ayatasto" or "Llatasto".

Don Vicente Toledo y Pimentel inherited and restored it in 1784. As he was a patriot, he supported the insurgent armies that moved to the north, and contributed 1,300 horses and 100 cows to General Juan Ramón Balcarce. The site was also used by the Army of the North to make handovers of command. Juan Martín de Pueyrredón gave the command of the troops to Manuel Belgrano on May 26, 1812; Belgrano would later give the command to José de San Martín on January 17, 1814, after his ill-fated expedition to Upper Peru, and Martín Miguel de Güemes would make his oath the following month.

Currently, only a part of the original building remains. There are stone remains of old rooms and a small church. Current rooms are four rooms at the floor level, and one upper room that may be accessed with wood stairs.

It was declared National Historic Monument of Argentina on July 14, 1942, by law Nº 95687. The owners donated it to the federal government on 1950, and it operates as a museum since then.
