= Joseph Belgrano =

Argentine military officer and politician

Colonel Joseph Gregorio Belgrano
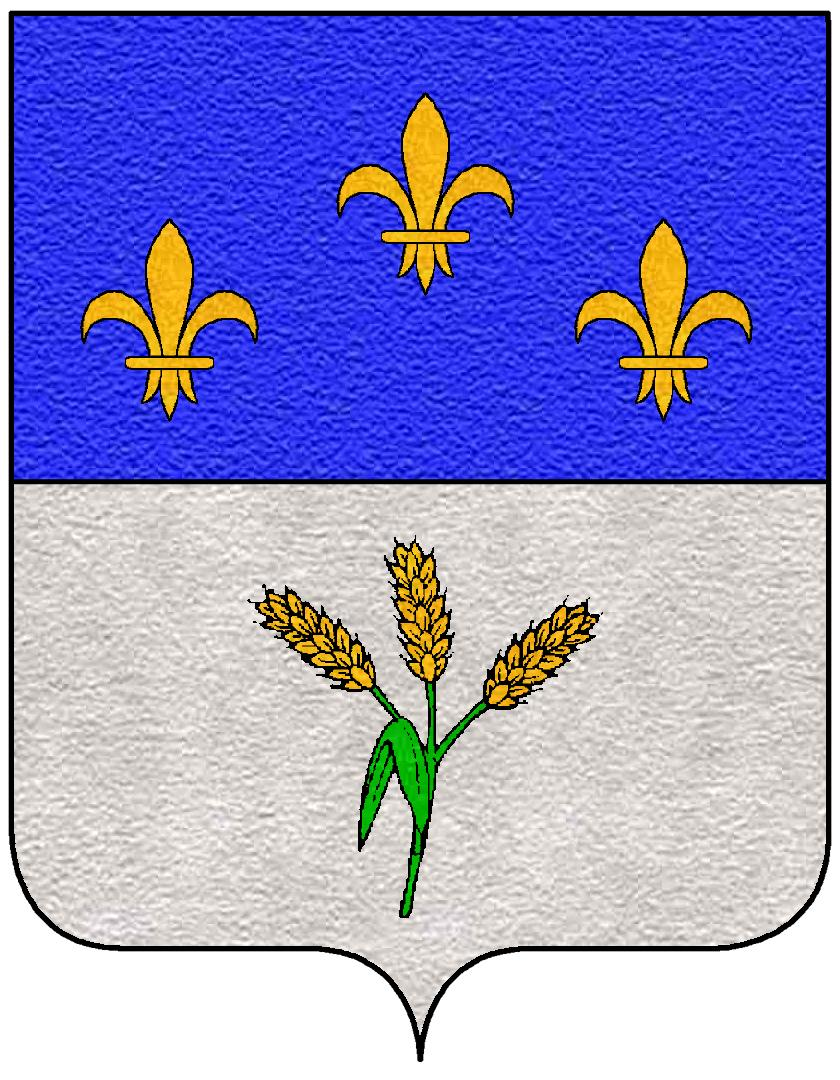
- Belgrano, coat of arms
- Born: Joseph María Gregorio Belgrano González; November 17, 1762; Buenos Aires, Viceroyalty of Peru
- Died: 1823 (aged 60–61); Buenos Aires, Argentina
- Burial place: La Recoleta Cemetery
- Spouse: Casiana Cabral Gutiérrez de Bárcena
- Military career
- Allegiance: Spain — until 1810 (Argentina) United Provinces of the River Plate
- Branch: Spanish Army; Argentine Army
- Service years: 1781-1823
- Rank: Colonel
- Commands: Regimiento de milicias de caballería of Buenos Aires
- Conflicts: British invasions of the River Plate; May Revolution; Argentine War of Independence

Signature
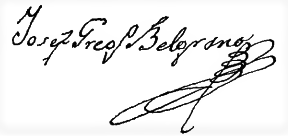

Joseph Gregorio Belgrano (1762–1823) was an Argentine military officer and politician. His brother was the General Manuel Belgrano, member of the Primera Junta and hero in Argentine War of Independence.

== Biography ==
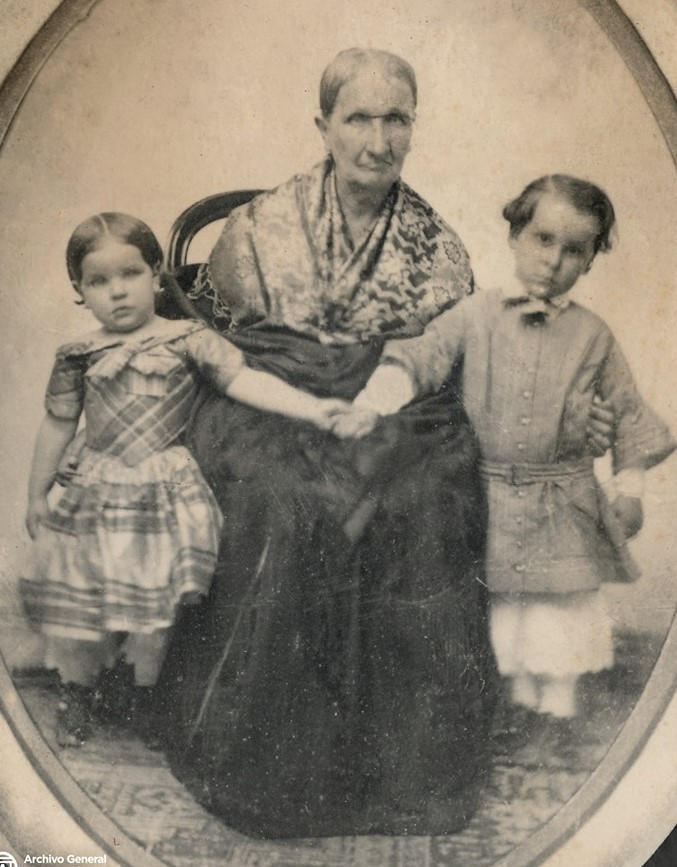
His wife, Doña Casiana Cabral y Gutiérrez de Bárcena.

He was born in Buenos Aires, son of Domingo Belgrano Pérez, a merchant born in Oneglia, and María Josefa González Casero, belonging to a distinguished family of Creole origin.

After completing his studies in Potosí, Joseph Belgrano began his military career as Standard-bearer, in the Regimiento de Milicias de Caballería de Buenos Aires. He had a great performance as commander of the Spanish militias of Buenos Aires. In 1800, the King Charles IV of Spain appointed him as Ayudante del Regimiento de Milicias de Caballería de la Plaza de Buenos Aires.

In 1806 and 1807, Belgrano participated with great heroism in defense of Buenos Aires against the English invaders (British invasions of the Río de la Plata). During May Revolution of 1810, he was invited to participate in the Cabildo abierto, voting in favor of the dismissal of the Viceroy Baltasar Hidalgo de Cisneros.

Joseph Belgrano was promoted to lieutenant colonel in 1811, serving in the garrison of Buenos Aires until his retirement.

== Family ==
Joseph Belgrano was married in the Parish Nuestra Señora de Montserrat to Casiana Cabral y Gutiérrez de Bárcena, daughter of José Luis Cabral and Martina Gutiérrez de Bárcena, belonging to an illustrious family of Creole origin. He and his wife were the parents of numerous children linked to distinguished Argentine families.

His sons, Domingo Estanislao Belgrano and José María Belgrano, were married to the sisters Fernanda and Margarita Rico Rueda, great-granddaughters of Francisco Rueda, born in El Puerto de Santa María, and Juana de Piña, a natural daughter of Antonio Piña, born in Morón de la Frontera and María Nicolasa Jaime Merlos, belonging to the Merlos family.

Joseph Gregorio Belgrano was a remote descendant of Gonzalo Casco. His ancestor Pedro Ramírez Reynoso, served as lieutenant in the Fort of Buenos Aires.
