= General Belgrano Department =

General Belgrano Department may refer to:

- General Belgrano Department, Chaco
- General Belgrano Department, La Rioja, in La Rioja Province, Argentina
- General Manuel Belgrano Department, in Misiones Province, Argentina

== See also ==
- General Belgrano (disambiguation)
