= List of ships named ARA General Belgrano =

At least two ships of the Argentine Navy have been named ARA General Belgrano:

- ARA General Belgrano (1896), was a Giuseppe Garibaldi-class cruiser launched in 1896 and scrapped in 1953.
- ARA General Belgrano, was a Brooklyn-class cruiser launched in 1938 as USS Phoenix and renamed ARA 17 de Octubre on transfer to Argentina in 1951. She was renamed General Belgrano in 1956 and sunk in 1982.
