= Belgranian National Institute =

Coordinates: 34.57586°S 58.42601765°W

The Belgranian National Institute (in Spanish, Instituto Nacional Belgraniano) is an institute of Argentina focused in the historiography of Manuel Belgrano.

== History ==
The institute was established as the "Belgranian Institute" on June 22, 1944. The creation was intended to be made in 1920, at the centennial of the death of Belgrano, but it was delayed for many years. Since then, the institute worked at congress, conferences and many cultural and educative activities. It also created many branches, local and international.

The institute was recognized by the national government in 1992 with decree 1435, which gave it its current name.

== Presidents ==
1. Enrique de Gandía (1944–1948)
2. Darío Saráchaga (1948–1949)
3. Virgilio Martínez De Sucre (1949–1954)
4. José Natale (1954–1954)
5. Raúl Martínez De Sucre (1954–1962)
6. Armando Vega Herrera (1962–1963)
7. Rosauro Pérez Aubone (1963–1964)
8. Augusto G. Rodríguez (1964–1968)
9. Emilio Bolón Varela (1968–1968)
10. Mario Quartaruolo (1968–1970)
11. Alfredo R. González Filgueira (1970–1973)
12. Roberto Bulla Rúa (1973–1976)
13. Carlos J. Mosquera (1976–1979)
14. Aníbal Jorge Luzuriaga (1979–1982)
15. Isaías J. García Enciso (1982–1985)
16. Alfredo R. González Filgueira (1985–1988)
17. Emilio A. Bidondo (1988–1991)
18. Aníbal Jorge Luzuriaga (1991–1992)
19. Aníbal Jorge Luzuriaga (1992–1996)
20. Aníbal Jorge Luzuriaga (1996–2000)
21. Aníbal Jorge Luzuriaga (2000–2001)
22. Aníbal Jorge Luzuriaga (2002–2005)
23. Aníbal Jorge Luzuriaga (2006–incumbent)

== See also ==
- Manuel Belgrano
