= Francisco Cabello y Mesa =

Spanish Soldier and Writer(1764–1814)

Francisco Antonio de Cabello y Mesa (1764–1814) was a Spanish soldier and writer. He edited the first newspapers of the current nations of Peru, Argentina and Uruguay and founded El telégrafo Mercantil in Buenos Aires in 1801. He wrote under the pseudonym Jaime Bausate y Meza.

Born in Extremadura, he joined the army without completing the law studies he started in Salamanca. He was sent to the Viceroyalty of Peru, where he was commissioned to defend the border of the province of Jauja, in the Amazon jungle, with the rank of colonel in 1790.

Returning from that duty, he edited the first newspaper published in South America, called The Curious Journal, Scholar and Trade, in Lima. He was one of the founders of the Patriotic Society of Friends of the Country, a typical group in the Age of Enlightenment. He was also an attorney from the Audiencia of Lima.

In 1798 he went off to Spain, but his travels came to an end in Buenos Aires, for health reasons, and because he had difficulty finding passage. In the capital of the Viceroyalty of the Río de la Plata, he contacted local representatives of the Enlightenment, including Secretary of Consulate in Buenos Aires, Manuel Belgrano.

He founded there the Society of Friends of the Country, but it was unsuccessful. This short-lived society had historical significance because, in partnership with the consulate, the Society published the first newspaper in present-day Argentina, El Telegraph Commercial, Rural, Political, Economic and historiography, although it was not often known by its full name. The first issue appeared in April 1801, as a collaboration between Cabello, Manuel Belgrano and José de Lavardén. The last issue was published in October, 1802, after ten issues as a result of poor circulation and declining subscribers.

Cabello belonged to the "Lodge Independence", active since 1805 in Buenos Aires, directed by Juan José Castelli, which intended to garner British support for separating the Spanish territories from their parent country. During the British invasion, many Creoles collaborated with the British. Many of them did so in secret, but Cabello agreed to hold a public position in the government of invading Governor William Carr Beresford. When the Reconquista occurred by the Creole and Spanish, Cabello was arrested and charged with treason against the King, and was taken prisoner at Montevideo.

The following year, in 1807, Cabello was arrested in the eastern city during the second British invasion. He was released when that city fell into the hands of General Samuel Auchmuty, and his successor in command, John Whitelocke, put him in charge of the editorial of a newspaper in British propaganda, the Southern Star, a bilingual publication with which the British hoped to ingratiate themselves with the natives. After the Battle of Buenos Aires, which forced the British to withdraw also from Montevideo, the British invaders refused to take Cabello with them. He was arrested by order of Viceroy Liniers and sent as a prisoner to Spain, where he was to be condemned to death. The French invasion of the peninsula prevented his return for a few years. He was released, and joined the Spanish Liberal Party in Sevilla. He took refuge in Cadiz, protected by the English fleet, until the restoration of King Ferdinand VII of Spain.

He was shot in Seville in 1814.
