= José Miguel Díaz Vélez =

Argentine politician (1770–1833)

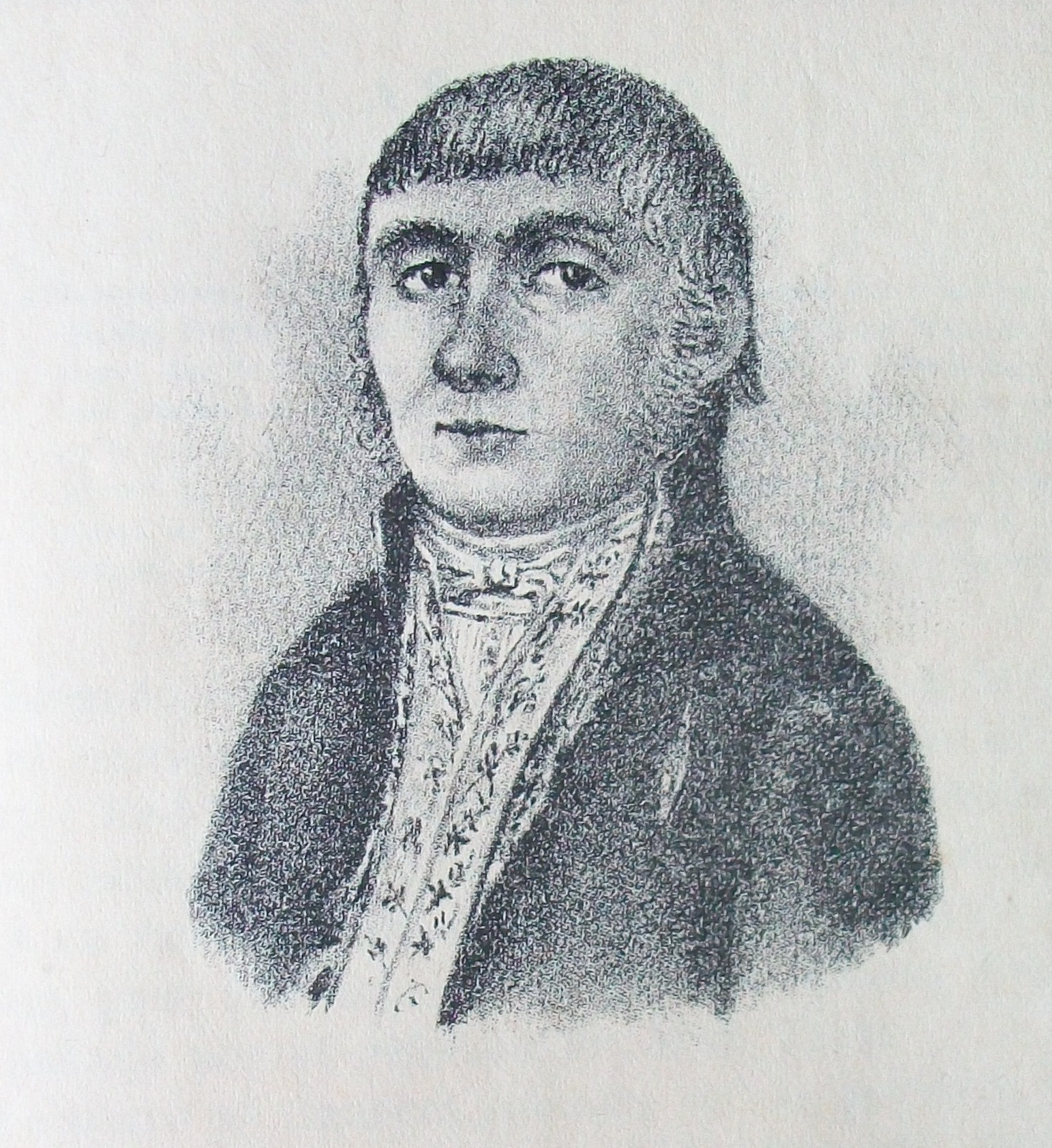
- Born: 1770; Tucumán
- Died: 1833 (aged 62–63)
- Spouse: Doña María del Transito Inciarte
- Military career
- Allegiance: Revolutionary army
- Rank: General

José Miguel Díaz Vélez (1770–1833) was an Argentine patriot and a leading figure in the struggle for Argentine independence. He served as a general and the Secretary General of Argentina's Unitarist regime. Vélez also participated in the civil wars that transpired thereafter. The Argentine General Manuel Díaz Vélez was his brother.

== Biography ==
Vélez was born in Tucumán in 1770 to Francisco Díaz Vélez, a Spanish merchant and María Petrona Aráoz, who belong to one of the prominent families in Tucumán. Vélez was the second of their children. He was educated at Colegio Real de San Carlos and later obtained a law degree in Chuquisaca. Vélez married Doña María del Transito Inciarte.

Vélez became a deputy for Tucuman in the General Constituent Congress from 1819 to 1820. He was noted as the Argentine representative who lodged the complaint before the Minister Plenipotentiary of the United Provinces in Upper Peru concerning the issue of the Bolivian jurisdiction over the province of Tarija.

Vélez died in 1833 in Paysandú, Uruguay.

== Argentine independence movement ==
Vélez was a prominent participant of the independence movement in the United Provinces of the River Plate. From 1810 to 1814, he was the commandant of the Entre Rios province. In September 1812, he was identified as the commander of the troops being pursued by the 600-strong royalist cavalry, which was defeated through the assistance of General Manuel Belgrano. In the same month, Vélez won a victory and captured Tucumán. On August 4, 1816 he led the invasion of the city of Santa Fe, which served as the center of the rival Federalist faction. The city was captured but it was later abandoned due to Federalist resistance.

He was recorded as one of the top diplomats who headed the Alvear-Diaz Velez Mission tasked to convince Simon de Bolivar to lead a Hispanic American alliance against Brazil. This alliance was primarily aimed at pressuring Dom Pedro I to withdraw his army stationed in the Eastern Province and give up territorial claims in South America. Their appointment was formalized by an Act passed on May 9, 1825, which authorized Vélez and Carlos María de Alvear to negotiate and settle issues concerning the freedom of the four provinces of Upper Peru. The mission was considered a failure after Bolivar remained ambivalent towards the proposal.

== Unitary regime ==
Vélez was appointed the secretary general of the provisional government established in Buenos Aires by Juan Lavalle in 1828. On 3 December 1828, he became the Minister of Foreign Relations, a position he held until 4 May 1829. When Lavalle's government collapsed, Vélez left Argentina and settled in Uruguay.
