= Commerce Consulate of Buenos Aires =

Spanish governmental body in colonial Argentina

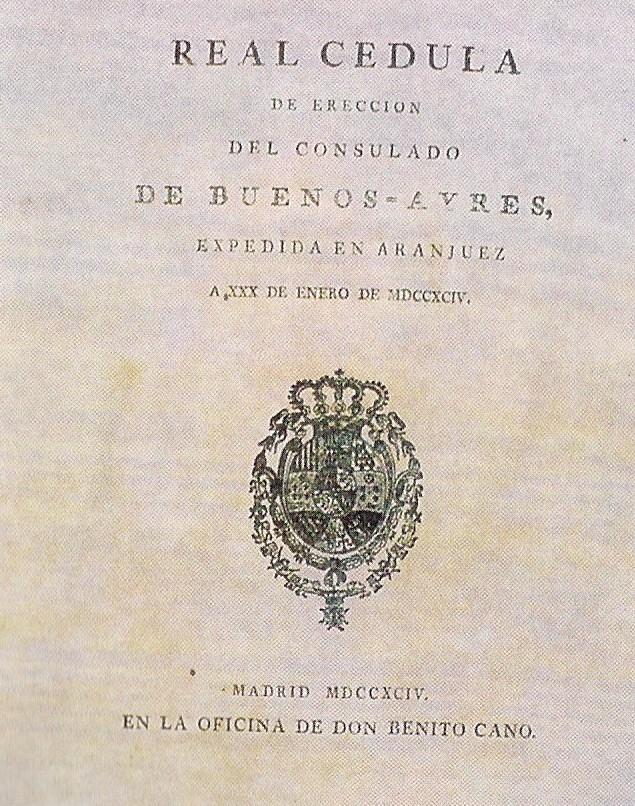
Royal issue for the creation of the consulate.

The Commerce Consulate of Buenos Aires was one of the most important institutions of the Viceroyalty of the Río de la Plata, along with the viceroy, the Cabildo and the religious ones.

The consulate was set up in 1794 at the request of local merchants. It was a collegial body which functioned as a commercial court (called the Court) and as a society of economic development (called Governing Board). The consulate was directly under command of the Spanish Crown, and it was directly governed by the rules dictated by the House of Trade in Seville.

It was largely a guild of merchants with powers delegated by the king in trade matters. It could settle lawsuits and claims brought by merchants and was financed by levying taxes. With the passing of the years it would increase the power of control over customs.

The Secretary of the consulate was required to propose annually, through the reading of a Consular Report, ways to promote agriculture, encourage industry and protect the commerce of the region. Manuel Belgrano, Secretary of the Embassy since its inception, set for himself the goal to transform a poor and virgin region into a rich and prosperous one.

== Manuel Belgrano and the Consulate ==
The first and only Secretary of the consulate, Manuel Belgrano, had to play with caution in assuming the leadership of that task the 3 June 1794. Having been designated as perpetual secretary of the consulate, he wrote the guidelines that would follow in its efforts of economic development, in a document which has survived. The ideals of the consulate and what could be achieved for the benefit of the viceroyalty, however, were far from desired.

He did not adopt a position of outright opposition, but a tone of education, which included frequent praise and prostrations to the king and the authorities. The criticism was always, therefore, about the contrast between the situation he complained about (apparently without accusing any person or body) and what the authorities had not done to ensure general welfare, making them therefore guilty of neglect or inaction. The date on which Belgrano became secretary, 3 June, was named Economist day in Buenos Aires in 2003.
