= Manuel Belgrano =

Argentine military leader, politician, and lawyer (1770–1820)

Manuel Belgrano TOSD
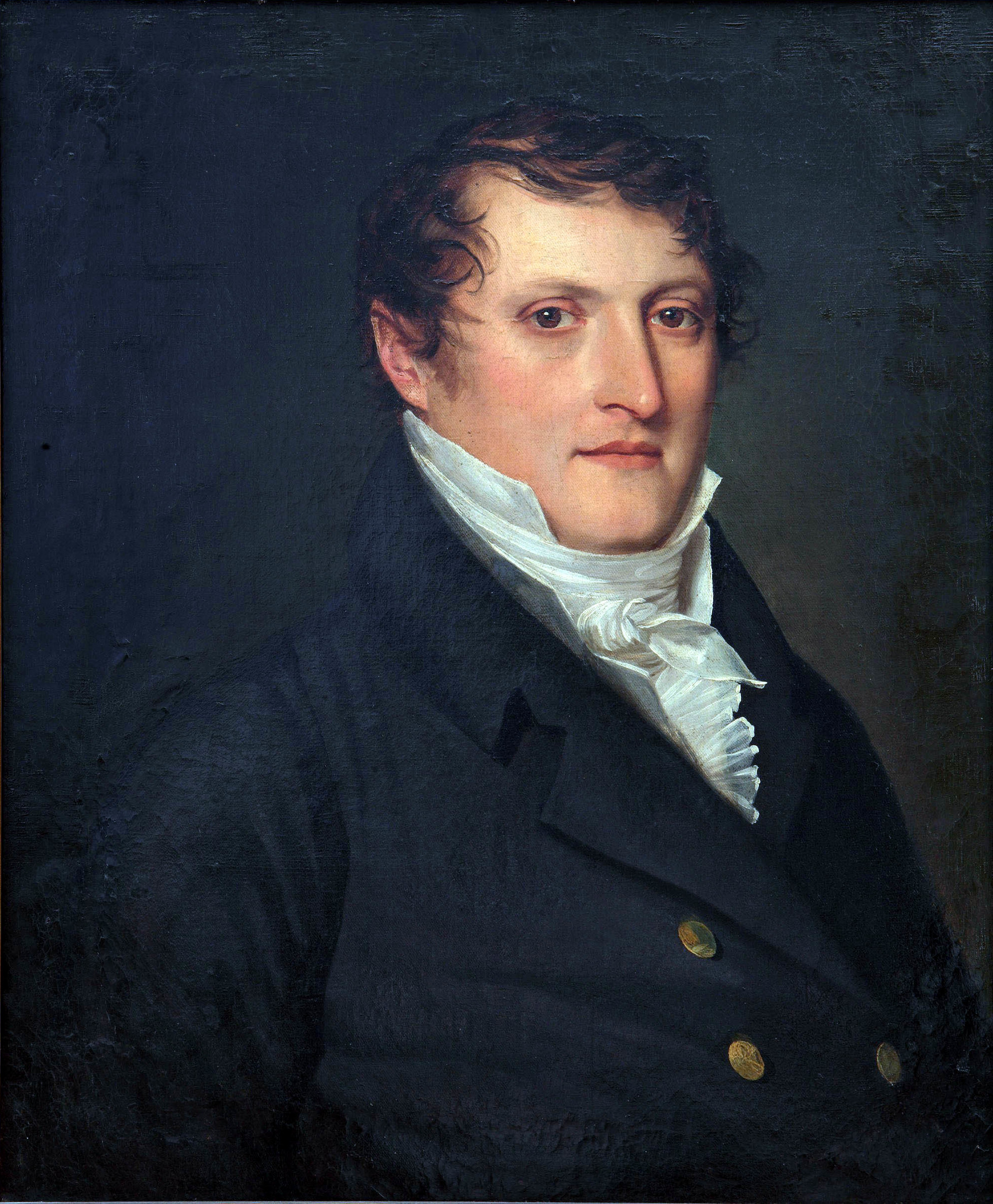
- Portrait of Belgrano attributed to Casimir Carbonnier

Committee member of the Primera Junta
- In office 25 May 1810 – 26 September 1810 Serving with Manuel Alberti, Miguel de Azcuénaga, Juan José Castelli, Domingo Matheu and Juan Larrea

Perpetual secretary of the Commerce Consulate of Buenos Aires
- In office 2 June 1794 – April 1810

Personal details
- Born: Manuel José Joaquín del Corazón de Jesús Belgrano; 3 June 1770 Buenos Aires, Governorate of the Rio de la Plata, Viceroyalty of Peru (now Argentina)
- Died: 20 June 1820 (aged 50) Buenos Aires, United Provinces of the Río de la Plata
- Party: Carlotism (1808-1810); Patriot
- Domestic partner(s): María Josefa Ezcurra, María Dolores Helguero
- Education: University of Valladolid
- Profession: Lawyer

Military service
- Allegiance: (Argentina) United Provinces of South America
- Years of service: 1810–1819
- Commands: Paraguay campaign; Army of the North; Regiment of Patricios
- Battles/wars: Argentine War of Independence; Paraguay campaign; Battle of Campichuelo; Battle of Paraguarí; Battle of Tacuarí; Battle of Tucumán; Battle of Salta; Battle of Vilcapugio; Battle of Ayohuma

Manuel José Joaquín del Corazón de Jesús Belgrano (3 June 1770 – 20 June 1820), usually referred to as Manuel Belgrano (Spanish pronunciation: [maˈnwel βelˈɣɾano]), was an Argentine public servant, economist, lawyer, politician, journalist, and military leader. He took part in the Argentine Wars of Independence and designed what became the flag of Argentina. Argentines regard him as one of the main Founding Fathers of the country. He was also a supporter of free trade.

Belgrano was born in Buenos Aires, the fourth child of Italian businessman Domingo Belgrano y Peri and of María Josefa González Casero. He came into contact with the ideas of the Age of Enlightenment while at university in Spain around the time of the 1789 French Revolution. In 1794 he returned to the Viceroyalty of the Río de la Plata, where he became a notable member of the criollo population of Buenos Aires; he tried to promote some of the new political and economic ideals, but found severe resistance from local peninsulares. This rejection led him to work towards greater autonomy for his country from the Spanish colonial regime. At first he unsuccessfully promoted the aspirations of Carlota Joaquina to become a regent ruler for the Viceroyalty during the period when the French imprisoned the Spanish King Ferdinand VII during the Peninsular War (1807–1814). Belgrano favoured the May Revolution, which removed the viceroy Baltasar Hidalgo de Cisneros from power on 25 May 1810. He was elected as a voting member of the Primera Junta that took power after the ouster.

As a delegate for the Junta, he led the ill-fated Paraguay campaign of 1810-1811. Belgrano's troops were beaten by Bernardo de Velasco at the battles of Paraguarí and Tacuarí. Though his army was defeated, the military campaign initiated the chain of events that led to the independence of Paraguay in May 1811. He retreated to the vicinity of Rosario, to fortify it against a possible royalist attack from the Eastern Band of the Uruguay River. While there, he developed the design of the flag of Argentina. The First Triumvirate did not approve the flag, but because of slow communications, Belgrano would only learn of that many weeks later, while reinforcing the Army of the North at Jujuy. There, knowing he was at a strategic disadvantage against the royalist armies coming from Upper Peru, Belgrano ordered the Jujuy Exodus, which evacuated the entire population of Jujuy Province to San Miguel de Tucumán. His counter-offensive at the Battle of Tucumán resulted in a key strategic victory, and it was soon followed by a complete victory over the royalist army of Pío Tristán at the Battle of Salta. However, his deeper incursions into Upper Peru ended with the defeats of Vilcapugio and Ayohuma, leading the Second Triumvirate to order his replacement as Commander of the Army of the North by the newly arrived José de San Martín. By then, the Asamblea del Año XIII had approved the use of Belgrano's flag as the national war flag.

Belgrano then went on a diplomatic mission to Europe along with Bernardino Rivadavia to seek support for the revolutionary government. He returned in time to take part in the Congress of Tucumán, which declared Argentine independence (1816). He promoted the Inca plan to create a constitutional monarchy with an Inca descendant as head of state. This proposal had the support of San Martín, Martín Miguel de Güemes, and many provincial delegates, but was strongly rejected by the delegates from Buenos Aires. The Congress of Tucumán approved the use of his flag as the national flag. After this, Belgrano again took command of the Army of the North, but his mission was limited to protecting San Miguel de Tucumán from royalist advances while San Martín prepared the Army of the Andes for an alternative offensive across the Andes. When José Gervasio Artigas and Estanislao López seemed poised to invade Buenos Aires, he moved his army southwards, but his troops mutinied in January 1820. Belgrano died of dropsy on 20 June 1820. His last words reportedly were: "¡Ay, Patria mía!" (Oh, my homeland!).

== Biography ==
=== Ancestry ===
Coat of Arms of the Belgrano family

Manuel José Joaquín del Corazón de Jesús Belgrano was born in Buenos Aires on 3 June 1770, at his father's house. It was located near the Santo Domingo convent, at Santo Domingo street, between the streets Martín de Tours and Santísima Trinidad (the modern names of those streets are "Belgrano", "Defensa", and "Bolívar" respectively). Though the city was still rather small, the Belgranos lived in one of its wealthiest neighborhoods. Manuel Belgrano was baptized at the Buenos Aires Metropolitan Cathedral the following day. As he was born in the Americas he was considered a criollo, a social class below the Peninsulars.

His father, Domingo (whose original Italian name was Domenico Belgrano Peri) came from the town of Imperia, Liguria, Italy. Domingo's maternal last name was Peri, which he translated to the Spanish form Pérez; his paternal last name was Belgrano – literally "Fairwheat", a name that denoted good cereal production. He changed his name "Domenico" to the Spanish "Domingo" as well. He was an Italian merchant authorized by the King of Spain to move to the Americas, and had contacts in Spain, Rio de Janeiro, and Britain. He promoted the establishment of the Commerce Consulate of Buenos Aires, which his son Manuel would lead a few years later.

Manuel Belgrano's mother was María Josefa González Islas y Casero, born in Santiago del Estero, Argentina. The family was the second richest in Buenos Aires, after the Escaladas.

Domingo Belgrano Pérez managed a family business, and arranged for his four daughters to marry merchants who would become his trusted agents in the Banda Oriental, Misiones Province, and Spain. The eight living male sons followed different paths: Domingo José Estanislao became canon at the local cathedral, while Carlos José and José Gregorio joined the army. Manuel Belgrano was meant to follow his father's work, but when he developed other interests, it was his brother Francisco José María de Indias who continued the family business.

=== European studies ===
Belgrano completed his first studies at the San Carlos school, where he learned Latin, philosophy, logic, physics, metaphysics, and literature; he graduated in 1786. Domingo had sufficient success as merchant to send his two sons Francisco and Manuel to study in Europe. He expected them to study commerce, but Manuel decided to study law. Belgrano was so successful and attained such prestige that Pope Pius VI allowed him to study forbidden literature, even books deemed as heretical, excepting only the astrological and obscene books. In this way he came into contact with authors like Montesquieu, Rousseau, and Filangieri, who were forbidden in Spain.

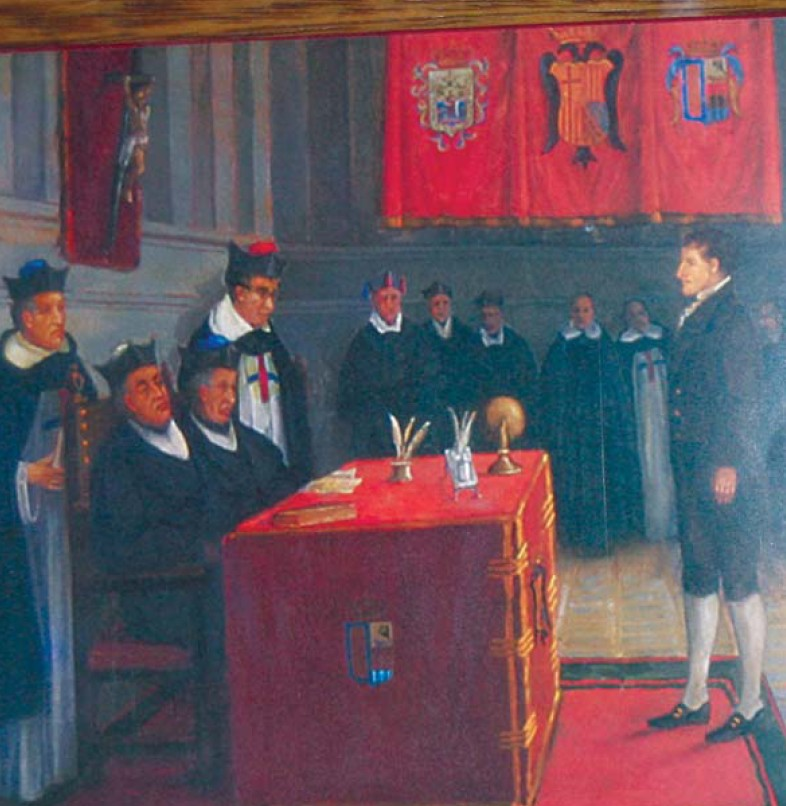
Manuel Belgrano as a student at the University of Salamanca

Belgrano studied near the intellectual elite of Spain, and by that time there were heated discussions about the ongoing French Revolution. The principles of equality and freedom, the universal scope of the Declaration of the Rights of Man and of the Citizen, and criticism of the divine right of kings were constant topics of debate. Among the supporters of these ideas it was thought that Spain should be remade under similar principles, and critics of such thought were rejected as tyrants or proponents of outdated ideas.

However, the Spanish Enlightenment was slightly different from the French one as it still respected religion and the monarchy. Thus, despite the new influences, Belgrano remained a strong Catholic and monarchist.

Belgrano also studied living languages, political economy, and public rights. The authors that most influenced him were Pedro Rodríguez de Campomanes, Gaspar Melchor de Jovellanos, Adam Smith, and François Quesnay. Belgrano translated Quesnay's book Maximes générales de gouvernement economique d'un royaume agricole (General Maxims of the Economical Government in an Agricultural Kingdom) to Spanish. His main interest in the works of such authors were ideas that referred to the public good and popular prosperity.

Like many South American students, he became interested in physiocracy, which stated that new wealth came from nature, that agriculture was an economic activity that generated more income than one needed, and that the state should not interfere at all with it. By that time, South America had plenty of natural resources and a very strict state interventionism in the economy. Belgrano developed the idea that the principles of physiocracy and those stated by Adam Smith could be applied together in the viceroyalty of the Río de la Plata. In the development of this approach he was influenced by Fernando Galliani, who promoted the study of particular cases over theoric generalisations, and Antonio Genovesi, who thought that the absolute freedom promoted by physiocrats should be tempered by a moderate intervention by the state, such as the provision of free education for some.

During his time in Europe, Belgrano became president of an Academy within the University of Salamanca devoted to Roman legislation, forensic practice and political economy. In 1794, he translated the Maximas del Gobierno agricultor, which had wide readership in Argentina before the revolution in 1810.

This publication, along with Belgrano's other works, showed his preference for a combination of the ideas of the physiocrats and the neomercantilist thought by Antonio Genovesi. For him, this was the right economic model that could support Argentina's independence.

=== Work in the consulate ===
He was driven by his vision of imperial partnership and drafted a well-known representacion to the Crown of 1793. A short time before his return to Buenos Aires on 3 June 1794, Belgrano was elected by Don Diego de Gardoqui as "perpetual secretary" of the Commerce Consulate of Buenos Aires, a new local institution which dealt with commercial and industrial issues in the name of the crown. This date would be later known in Argentina as Economist Day. He would remain in this office until 1810, and would deal with commercial disputes and promote agriculture, industry, and commerce. Not having enough freedom to make big changes in the economic system, he made big efforts to improve education. Influenced by Campomanes, he believed that the true wealth of countries was human ingenuity, and that the best way to promote industrialisation was through education.

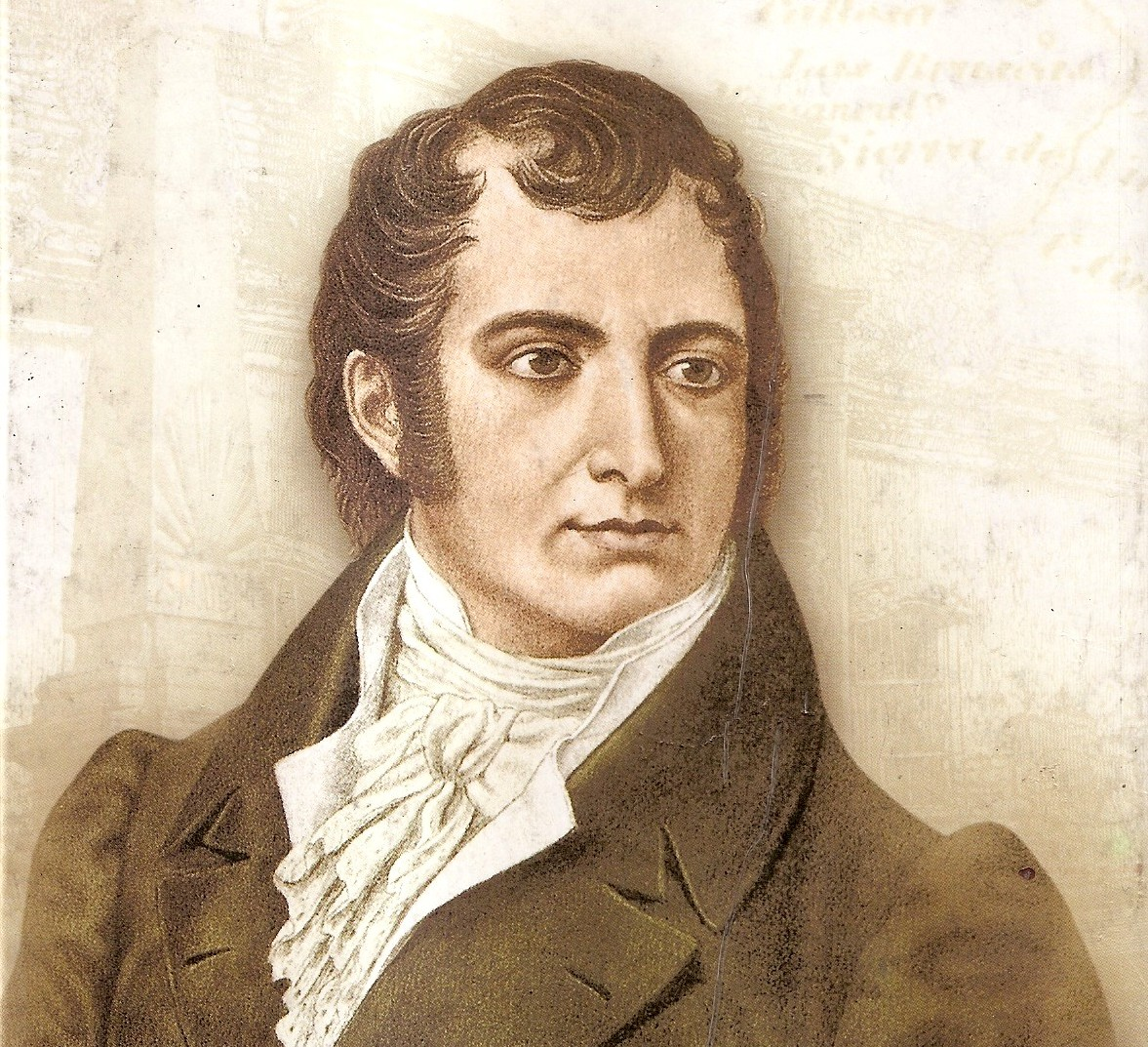
Juan José Castelli shared with his cousin Belgrano the work in the consulate and in journalism.

Belgrano maintained frequent discussions with the committee members of the consulate, who were all merchants with strong interests involved in the monopolic commerce with Cádiz. He made many proposals, influenced by free trade ideas. By this time, Belgrano thought that "The merchant must have freedom to buy where he can be best accommodated, and it's natural that he does where he is supplied with the best price to be able to earn the best profit". Those proposals were rejected by the committee members; his only supporters were Juan José Castelli, Juan Larrea, and Domingo Matheu. However, Belgrano had some successes, such as creating the Nautical School, the Commerce School, and the Geometry and Drawing Academy. He created the Commerce School to influence future merchants to work towards the best interests of the nation, and the nautical and drawing ones to provide the youth with prestigious and lucrative careers. The schools were situated next to the Consulate so that Belgrano could easily supervise their development. The schools were in place for three years before they were closed by a ruling of Manuel Godoy, from the Spanish monarchy, who considered them an unnecessary luxury for a colony. It was felt that Buenos Aires might not be able to maintain them.

Belgrano tried to promote the diversification of agriculture via the production of linen and hemp, following experiences with his friend Martín de Altolaguirre. He proposed to keep reserves of wheat to help have control over its price. He also tried to make leather recognised as a product of the country, in order to promote its commercial potential. None of these proposals were accepted. He designed a system to give prizes to achievements that would boost the local economy, diversify the agriculture, or deforest the pampas. The system did not work as expected, and as nobody met the requirements no such prize was ever given.

He helped to create the first newspaper of the city, the Telégrafo Mercantil, directed by Francisco Cabello y Mesa. He worked with Manuel José de Lavardén, and edited nearly two hundred issues. The newspaper was closed in 1802 because of conflicts with the authorities of the viceroyalty, who did not like the criticisms made in it or the jokes and parodies. He also worked at the Semanario de Agricultura, Comercio e Industria, directed by Hipólito Vieytes. He used this newspaper to explain his economic ideas: manufacturing and exporting finished goods, importing raw materials to manufacture, avoiding importing luxury goods or raw materials that could be produced or extracted locally, importing only vital products, and owning a merchant navy. The newspaper specialised in the "Philosophy of History, Geography and Statistics". Many revolutionary principles were presented as essays.

Belgrano had symptoms of syphilis, which he had caught during his time in Europe. This sickness forced him to take long leaves from his work in the consulate, and to suggest his cousin Juan José Castelli, who had similar ideas, as a possible replacement during his leaves. Rejection by the committee members delayed the approval of Castelli until 1796.

=== British invasions ===
Belgrano was appointed as captain of the urban militias in 1797 by viceroy Pedro Melo de Portugal, who was instructed by Spain to prepare defences against a possible British or Portuguese attack. Belgrano by then worked in the consulate, and was no longer interested in pursuing a military career. Viceroy Rafael de Sobremonte requested that he create a militia to counter a possible British attack, but he did not take interest in it. His first participation in a military conflict took place when the British, under William Carr Beresford, arrived with 1,600 men and captured Buenos Aires, as part of the first British invasion of the River Plate. Belgrano moved to the fortress as soon as he heard the warning, and gathered as many men as possible to join him in the fighting. However, as most of them lacked any formal training, his men marched in disorder and Belgrano ordered them to disband after a single British cannon shot scattered his panicked men. Belgrano would write later in his autobiography that he regretted not having by then even the most basic knowledge of militia work.

After the British captured the city, all Spanish authorities were requested to pledge allegiance to the British crown. Belgrano thought that the members of the consulate should leave the city and join the viceroy, but the others did not agree. They acceded to the British request; Belgrano refused to do so. He said that he wanted "either our old master, or no master at all". To avoid being forced to pledge allegiance, he escaped from Buenos Aires and sought asylum at the chapel of Mercedes, in the Banda Oriental.

The British Army was defeated by a force under the direction of Santiago de Liniers, and Spanish authority was restored. It was expected that the British would return, and the whole city started to prepare for that possibility. Belgrano returned to Buenos Aires after the reconquest, and put himself under the command of Liniers. He was appointed sergeant of the Patricians Regiment, under the command of Cornelio Saavedra, and started to study military strategy. After some conflicts with other officials, he resigned as sergeant and served again under the command of Liniers. A new British attack took place in July 1807. During the battle he served as field assistant to a division commanded by Balbiani.

Belgrano resumed his work in the consulate and discontinued his military studies. Due to his knowledge of French he had a brief interview with the British officer Robert Craufurd, who proposed British support for an independentist movement. Belgrano turned down the offer, suspecting that Britain might withdraw their support if their attentions were distracted by events which could occur in Europe, and in such case the revolutionaries would be helpless against a Spanish counterattack.

=== Carlotism ===
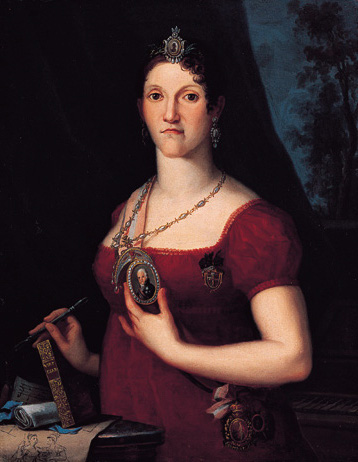
Belgrano supported the aspirations of Carlota Joaquina de Borbón

Manuel Belgrano was the main proponent of the Carlotist political movement in the Rio de la Plata, a response to recent developments in Europe, where Spain was at war with France. Through the abdications of Bayonne, the Spanish king Ferdinand VII was deposed and imprisoned and the Frenchman Joseph Bonaparte was appointed King of Spain by the French victors. This led to a partial power vacuum in the viceroyalty, as the legitimacy of the new king was rejected by all parties. The purpose of the Carlotist movement was to replace the authority of the deposed king with that of Carlota Joaquina, sister of Ferdinand, who was then living in Rio de Janeiro. The project was supported as a means to achieve more autonomy, and perhaps independence, for Spanish colonies in the New World. Belgrano kept a fluent mail communication with Carlota, and convinced many independentists to join him in the project, such as Castelli, Vieytes, Nicolás Rodríguez Peña, and Juan José Paso.

The project, however, found strong resistance. As Carlota was married to John VI, a prince of Portugal, many people though that Carlotism was a trick to conceal Portuguese expansionism. Carlota herself had different political ideas than those of her supporters: Belgrano and the others shared the ideas of enlightenment, but Carlota aspired to keep the full power of an absolutist monarchy. By 1810 the project was forgotten.

A new viceroy, Baltasar Hidalgo de Cisneros, arrived from Europe to replace Liniers. Belgrano had failed to convince Liniers of the benefits of the Carlotist plan, so he aimed instead to convince him of refusing to give up the viceroyalty, as Liniers had been confirmed as viceroy by a Spanish king. Cisneros, appointed by the Junta of Seville, lacked such legitimacy. Liniers refused this proposal as well, and handed command to Cisneros without resistance. Belgrano later convinced the new viceroy to allow him to edit a new newspaper, the "Correo de Comercio". This allowed him to gather with other revolutionary leaders with the excuse of discussing the development of the newspaper. He also supported Cisneros when he allowed foreign trade at the port (previously only Spanish ships were allowed), but this ruling was strongly rejected by Spanish merchants. The lawyer Mariano Moreno wrote The Representation of the Hacendados, an economic essay that convinced Cisneros to maintain the free foreign trade. Some historians, such as Miguel Ángel Scenna, suggest that the essay was actually Belgrano's work, or a work by Moreno from a draft written by Belgrano. Belgrano may not have been able to present such a work himself, because he held a political office and because his past opposition to Cisneros may have risked its rejection.

Belgrano resigned from his work in the Consulate in April 1810 and moved to the countryside. A short time later he received a letter from his friends requesting him to return to Buenos Aires and join the revolutionary movements.

=== May Revolution ===
The Peninsular War was not developing favourably for Spain, and by May 1810 a ship arrived with the news of the defeat of Seville and the disbanding of the Junta of Seville. Without either a recognised Spanish king or the Junta that had appointed Cisneros, many people thought that the viceroy no longer had any authority. Cisneros tried to conceal the news by gathering all the newspapers brought by the ship, but Belgrano and Castelli managed to get one. Cisneros then explained the European developments to the public. Belgrano and the members of the Carlotist party, despite having given up their original idea, plotted to remove the viceroy and replace him with a junta. Under the advice of Cornelio Saavedra, they waited for the news of the defeat in Spain to take action.

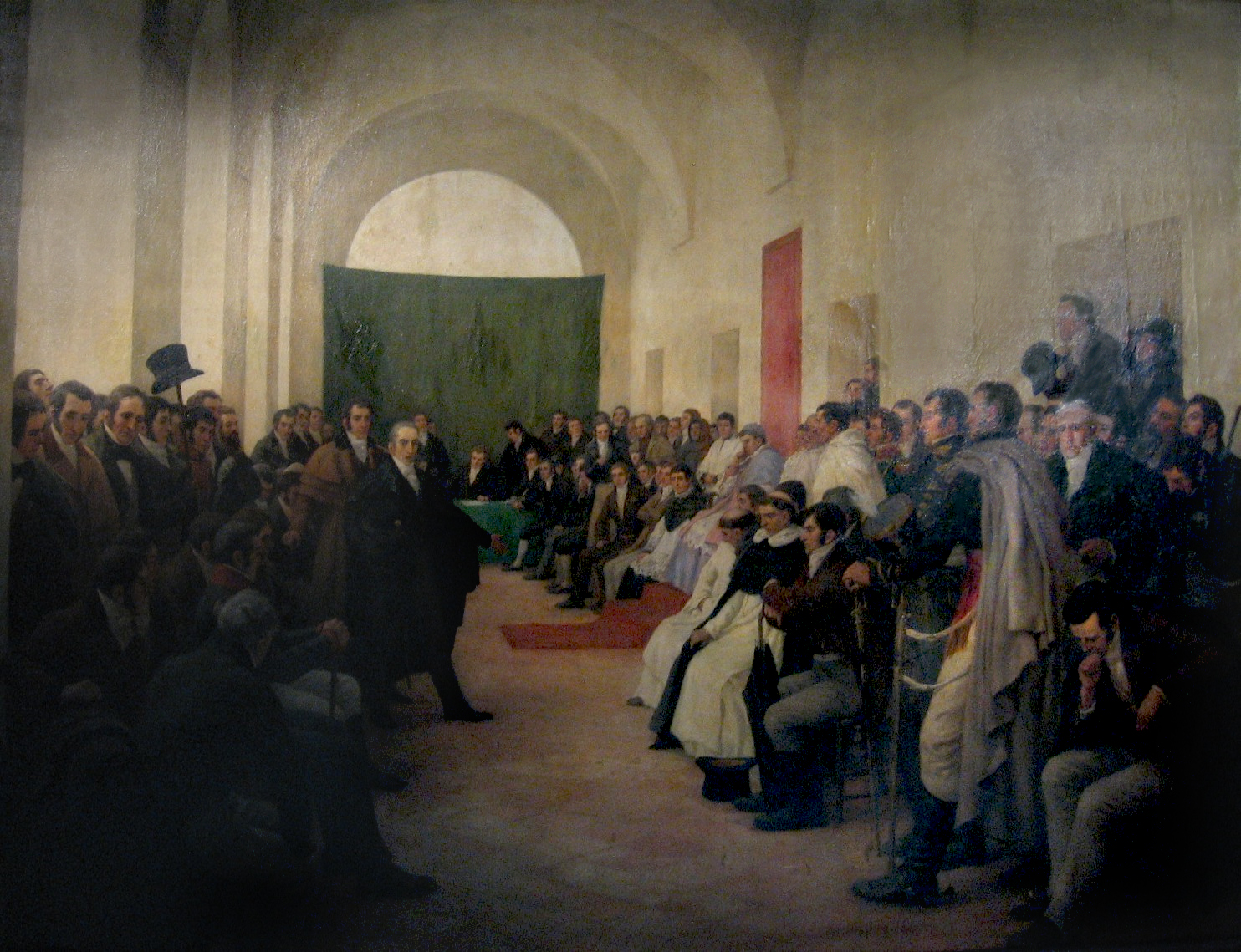
The Open Cabildo on 22 May 1810, by Pedro Subercaseaux

Belgrano and Saavedra, representing the military and the intellectuals, got an interview with Cisneros to request an open cabildo, but without getting an answer. Cisneros called the military leaders and requested their support, but they refused, under the grounds that his viceroyalty lacked legitimacy. Castelli and other patriots insisted in their request, and Cisneros finally accepted. A massive demonstration the following day ensured that Cisneros would keep his word. The open cabildo was held on 22 May, with all political leaders present, and armed men filling the Plaza and ready to invade the cabildo in case the peninsulars attempted a disruption, which would be indicated by a signal from Belgrano. He supported the stance of his cousin Castelli, who made a speech explaining the concept of the retroversion of the sovereignty of the people, and that Spanish America was subject to the King of Spain but not to Spain itself. At the time of voting, Castelli's proposal was coupled with the one of Cornelio Saavedra, with Belgrano among its supporters. This joint proposal for the removal of Cisneros and the creation of a government junta prevailed over the others. However, the cabildo attempted to keep Cisneros in power in spite of this result, by creating a junta with Cisneros as its president. This was rejected by the revolutionary leaders and the population. A great state of turmoil ended when the Junta was disbanded on 25 May and replaced by the Primera Junta. Belgrano was included in this junta, among many other local politicians.

In his autobiography Belgrano declared that he did not have any previous knowledge of being included in the junta, and that his appointment took him by surprise. Nevertheless, he accepted the role. He was part of the political line of Mariano Moreno; they were expecting to use the government to make big changes in the social order. One of his first rulings was the making of a Maths Academy, located in the building of the consulate and with the purpose of instructing the military. Belgrano was appointed its protector. He supported the banishment of Cisneros and the members of the Real Audience, and the execution of Liniers and other counter-revolutionaries defeated in Córdoba. Some historians suggest that he would have promoted the creation of the Operations plan, a secret document written by Moreno that set harsh ways for the junta to achieve its goals, while others consider the whole document a literary forgery done by royalists to discredit the junta. A few others suspect that some paragraphs or the whole document may have been the result of collaborative writing between Moreno, Belgrano, and Hipólito Vieytes.

=== Expedition to Paraguay ===
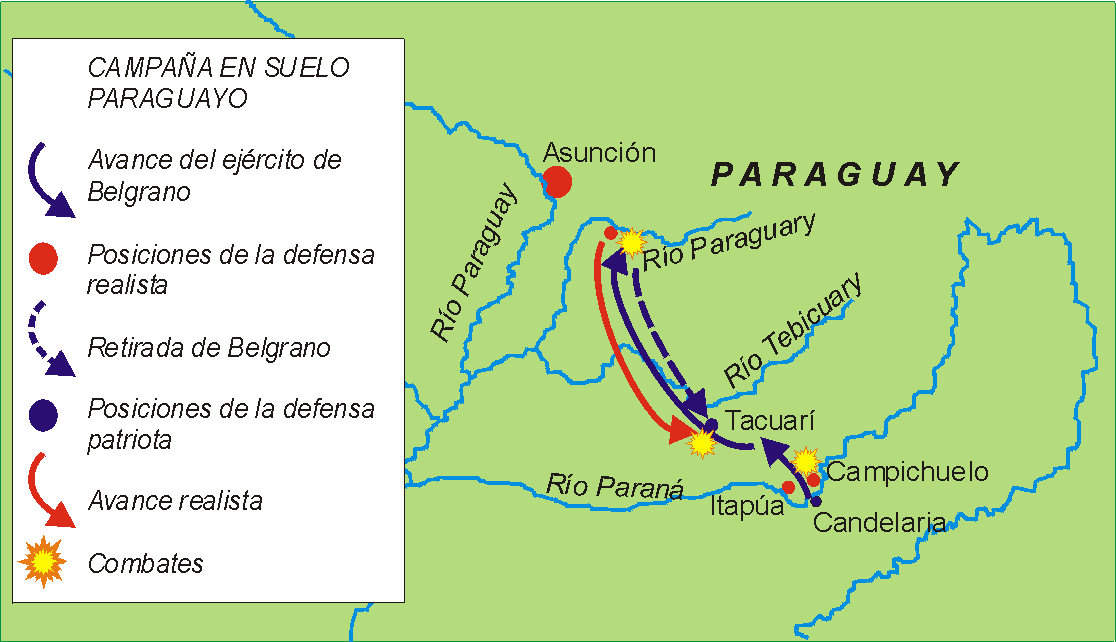
Argentine armies heading to Paraguay (December 1810 – March 1811

Three months after the creation of the Primera Junta, Manuel Belgrano was appointed Chief Commander of an army sent to gather support at Corrientes, Santa Fe, Paraguay, and the Banda Oriental. A few days later his goal was made more specific: he must aim for Paraguay. The Junta had been informed that the patriotic party was strong, and a small army would suffice to take control. Trusting this information, Belgrano went to Paraguay with two possible goals: get acknowledgment for the Junta in Paraguay or promote a new government that would stay on friendly terms with Buenos Aires. Belgrano was unaware that on 24 July a general assembly in Paraguay discussed the Junta of Buenos Aires, and decided to reject it and pledge allegiance to the Regency Council of Spain.

Belgrano headed north with nearly two hundred men, expecting to gather more people by the end of the Paraná River. Soldiers from the Blandengues regiments of San Nicolás and Santa Fe joined them en route, and later the Junta sent reinforcements of another two hundred soldiers. The army was welcomed by most of the population along the way, receiving donations and new recruits. Ultimately the army was composed of nearly 950 men, consisting of infantry and cavalry divided in four divisions with one piece of artillery each.

By the end of October the army stopped at Curuzú Cuatiá, where Belgrano solved an old border conflict between Corrientes and Yapeyu. He set which territories would belong to Curuzu Cuatiá and Mandisoví, and organised their urban layout around the chapel and school. By November the army arrived at the coast of Paraná near Apipé island, and there Belgrano took measures to benefit the natives that were living in missions. With his authority as speaker of the Junta he gave them full civil and political rights, granted lands, authorised commerce with the United Provinces, and lifted their restriction on taking public or religious office. However, the Junta requested later that he should seek authorization for such changes in the future.

From that point the army moved to Candelaria, which was used as a stronghold for the attack into Paraguay. The terrain gave a clear advantage to the Paraguayan governor Velazco against Belgrano: the Paraná River, nearly 1,000 metres (3,300 ft) wide, was an effective natural barrier, and once it was crossed the patriotic army would have to move a long distance across a land without supplies. Swamps, hills, rivers, and lakes would force the army to march slowly, making a possible retreat very difficult. The Parana was crossed with several boats on 19 December, and a task force of 54 Paraguayan soldiers was forced to flee during the Battle of Campichuelo. Belgrano saw Velazco's army from the Mbaé hill, and despite being greatly outnumbered, he ordered an attack, trusting in the moral strength of his soldiers. When the Battle of Paraguarí started, the patriots briefly held the upper hand, but eventually Velazco, with superior numbers, prevailed. Even with 10 deaths and 120 soldiers taken prisoner, Belgrano wanted to continue the fight, but his officials convinced him to retreat.

The army left for Tacuarí, being closely watched by the combined armies of Yegros and Cabañas. Those two armies had nearly three thousand soldiers, while Belgrano had barely four hundred. They were attacked from many sides during the Battle of Tacuarí, on 9 March. Greatly outnumbered and losing an unequal fight, Belgrano refused to surrender. He reorganised the remaining 235 men and ordered his secretary to burn all his documents and personal papers to prevent them from falling into enemy hands. Belgrano arranged for the troops and artillery to fire for many minutes, which made the Paraguayan soldiers disperse. When the barrage stopped, Belgrano requested an armistice, telling Cabañas that he had arrived to Paraguay to aid and not to conquer; considering the open hostility with which he was met, he would leave the province. Cabañas accepted, on the grounds that the remaining group must leave the province within a day.

The campaign to Paraguay was a complete military defeat for Belgrano. However, the aftermath of the conflict led the Paraguayans to replace Velazco with a local junta, and declare independence from Spain. Under the rule of José Gaspar Rodríguez de Francia, Paraguay broke ties with Buenos Aires as well, and stayed isolated for several years afterwards.

=== Creation of the flag of Argentina ===
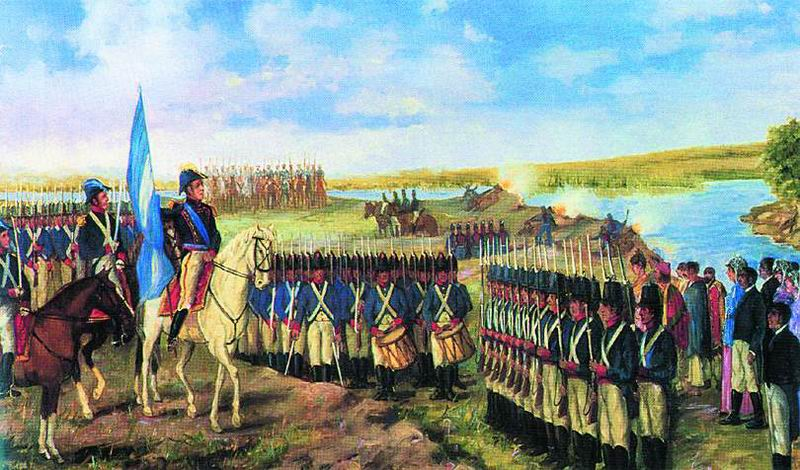
First use of the Flag of Argentina

After the defeat in Tacuarí, the government of Buenos Aires (which by then was the First Triumvirate) issued a series of conflicting orders. First they requested he should fight the royalists in the Banda Oriental, then to return to the city and be judged for the defeats. However, no charges were formulated against him.

He was appointed as the head of the Regiment of Patricians, replacing the banished Cornelio Saavedra, but the troops did not accept him and started the Braids Mutiny. After that, the Triumvirate requested that he fortify Rosario against possible royalist attacks from the Banda Oriental. Belgrano created two batteries, "Independencia" ("Independence") and "Libertad" ("Freedom"). After realising that both patriots and royalists were fighting under the same colours, he created the cockade of Argentina, of light blue and white, the use of which was approved by the Triumvirate. The reasons for the colours are usually considered to be either loyalty to the House of Bourbon or his esteem of the Virgin Mary. Belgrano created a flag with the same colours, which was hoisted at Rosario near the Paraná River on 27 February 1812. On that same day he was appointed to replace Pueyrredon in the Army of the North, so he travelled to Yatasto.

He found demoralised officials, nearly 1,500 soldiers (a quarter of them hospitalised), minimal artillery, and no money. Some of the officials were Manuel Dorrego, Gregorio Aráoz de Lamadrid, Cornelio Zelaya, José María Paz, Diego Balcarce, and Eustaquio Díaz Vélez. The cities were much more hostile to the Army than those that Belgrano encountered on his way into Paraguay. Salta was menaced by the royalist general José Manuel de Goyeneche; Belgrano had orders to take command and retreat without fighting, but he disobeyed. He prepared a base at Campo Santo, in Salta, where he improved the hospital and created a military tribunal. He later moved to Jujuy, knowing that he did not have the resources to launch an attack on Upper Peru.

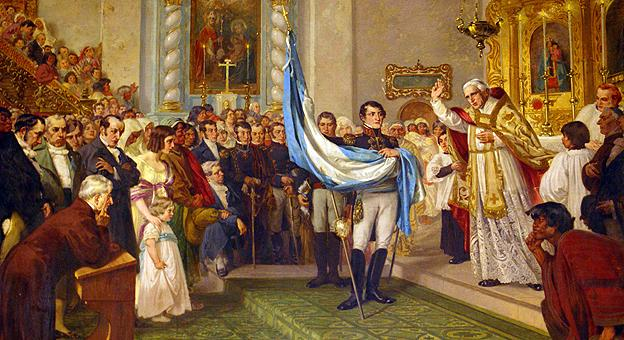
Blessing of the Flag of Argentina at Jujuy

The First Triumvirate did not approve the use of the flag created in Rosario, but Belgrano was initially unaware of that. He had the flag blessed by the priest Juan Ignacio de Gorriti at Salta, on the second anniversary of the May Revolution. When he found out the flag was not approved, he put it away. When asked, he would say that he was keeping it for a great victory.

Three months later royalist general Pío Tristán advanced in the north with more than three thousand men, prepared to invade the United Provinces. Once again outnumbered by larger armies, Belgrano organised a great exodus of the city of Jujuy: the entire population of the city would have to retreat with the army and not leave behind anything that might be of value to the royalists (such as animals, crops, or housing). By September a proper formation of columns provided them with a victory against a royalist task force of 500 men during the Battle of Las Piedras. The First Triumvirate commanded Belgrano to retreat to Cordoba without fighting, but he thought that doing so would mean the loss of the northern provinces. Thus, instead of continuing to Cordoba, he was convinced by the people of San Miguel de Tucumán to make a stand there. His forces had increased by then to nearly 1,800 soldiers, still much less than the 3,000 at Tristan's command. Even so, he obtained a victory in the Battle of Tucumán.

By that time, the First Triumvirate was replaced by the Second Triumvirate, which provided greater support for Belgrano. The Second Triumvirate called the Assembly of Year XIII soon after taking power, which was intended to declare independence and enact a national constitution but failed to do so because of political disputes between the members. It did not take measures regarding the national flag but allowed Belgrano to use the blue and white flag as the flag of the Army of the North.

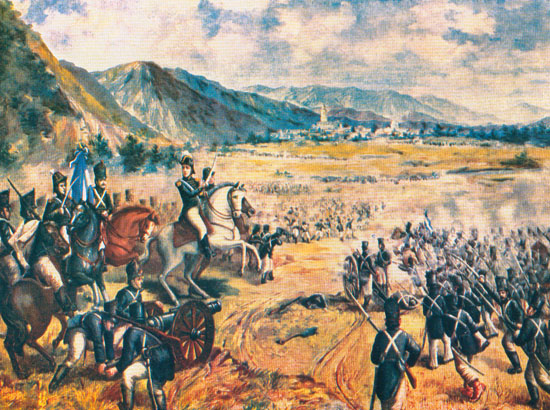
The Battle of Salta, by Arístides Papi

By September, he provided assistance to the troops commanded by José Miguel Díaz Vélez. This infantry was fighting a 600-strong royalist cavalry. Through Belgrano's reinforcements, they eventually won the battle and captured the city of Tucumán. After the defeat in Tucumán, Tristán garrisoned at the city of Salta with 2,500 men. Belgrano, with reinforcements from the government, intended to gather 4,000 men and march to Upper Peru, up to the border of the Viceroyalty of Lima. The Battle of Salta, the first battle with the new approved banner, was a decisive victory, ending with the capitulation of Pío Tristán and all of his army.

These victories ensured Argentine authority in the northwest and stopped the royalist advance into the central territory. Although there were a number of colonialist 'invasions' from Upper Peru until 1821, Belgrano's campaign is widely considered the decisive one.

=== Campaign to Upper Peru ===
By June 1813 Belgrano set up a base in Potosí with an army of 2,500 men, to prepare an attack on Upper Peru. Goyeneche moved to Oruro and resigned, being replaced by Joaquín de la Pezuela. Belgrano administrated the zone and tried to revert the bad impression left by the previous campaign of Juan José Castelli. Belgrano initiated good relations with the natives as well. Belgrano's plan was to attack the royalists from the front and the sides, with the aid of the armies of Cárdenas and Zelaya. Both armies were near 3,500 men. However, the royalists obtained an important advantage by defeating Cárdenas and getting possession of his papers, which gave them insight into the patriotic plans.

Belgrano was taken by surprise at Vilcapugio on 1 October, and initially gained the upper hand against the royalist troops, who started to flee. However, when Pezuela saw that the patriotic armies were not following, he reorganised his forces, returned to the battle, and won. There were barely 400 survivors. Belgrano said: "Soldiers: we have lost the battle after so much fighting. Victory has betrayed us by going to the enemy ranks during our triumph. It does not matter! The flag of the nation still swings in our hands!". After gathering his army at Macha, where he received reinforcements from Cochabamba, Belgrano was ready for another engagement with Pezuela, whose troops were not in a better situation. On 14 November, Belgrano was again vanquished by the royalists at Ayohuma, and was forced to withdraw the remains of his army towards Potosí and from there to Jujuy.

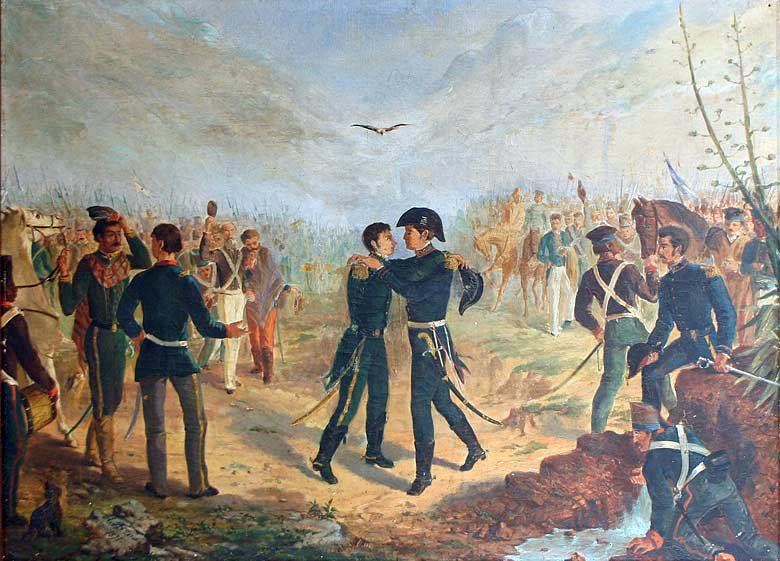
Meeting of Belgrano and José de San Martín at the Yatasto relay

The Second Triumvirate reacted by sending José de San Martín to take the command of the Army of the North, with Belgrano as his second in command. San Martín would reinforce the battle-weary Army of the North with his own soldiers. Hastened by Belgrano's illness, San Martín travelled to the rendezvous as quickly as possible; they met at the Yatasto relay, in Salta. Belgrano gave San Martin full freedom to implement changes and took command of the First Regiment. The Second Triumvirate, and later the Supreme Director Gervasio Posadas, requested Belgrano to return to Buenos Aires and be judged for the defeats at Vilcapugio and Ayohuma, but San Martín refused to send him because of his poor health. San Martín finally agreed to send Belgrano to Córdoba by March 1814. He temporarily settled in Luján to await outcome of the trial, and during this time he wrote his autobiography. Soon afterwards, all charges against Belgrano were dismissed, as no definite accusation was formulated against him. The new government, trusting in Belgrano's diplomatic abilities, sent him on a mission to Europe to negotiate support for the independence of the United Provinces.

=== Declaration of Independence ===
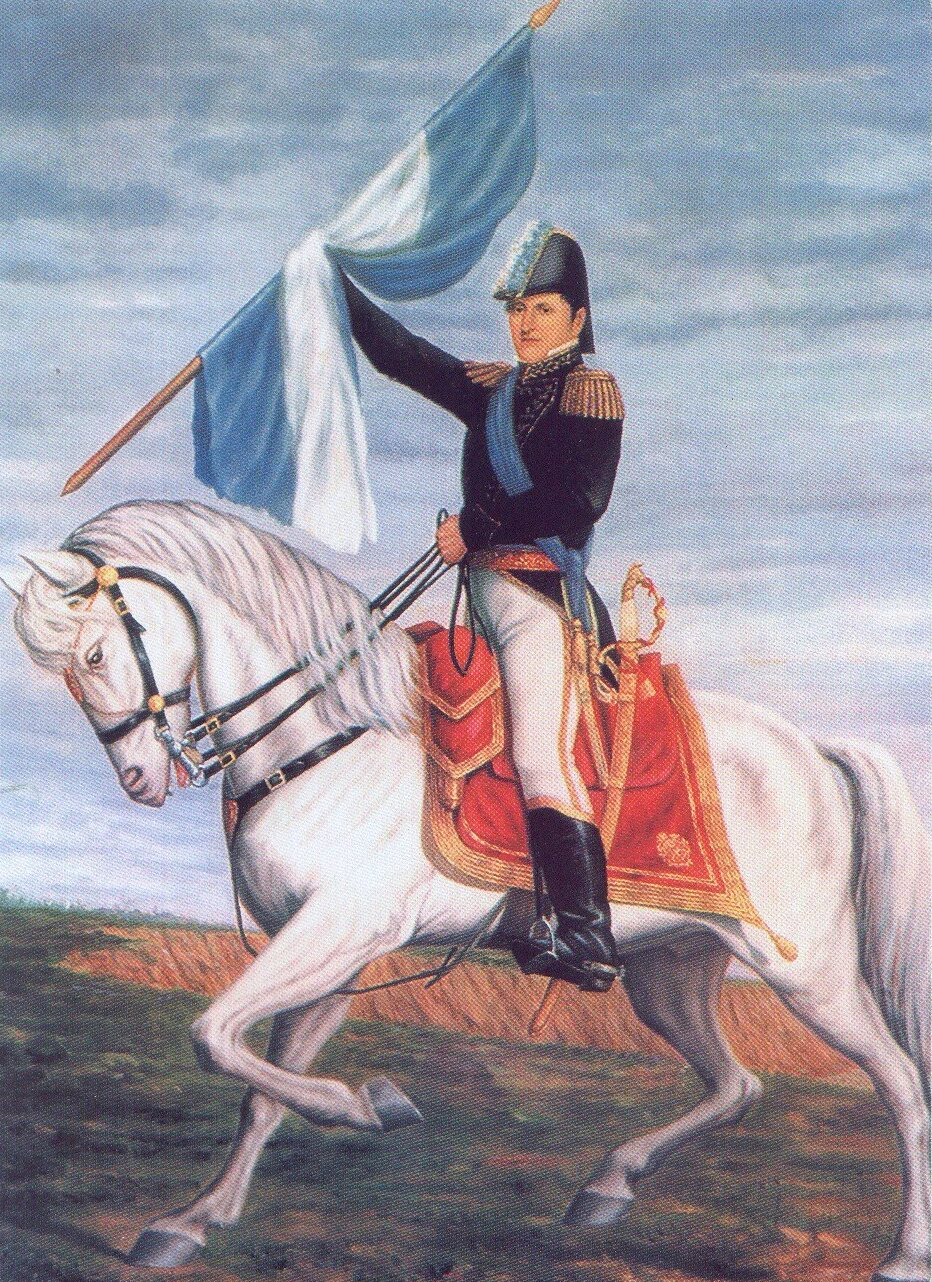
Manuel Belgrano holds the Flag of Argentina

By 1814 the Spanish King Ferdinand VII had returned to the throne and started the Absolutist Restoration, which had grave consequences for the governments in the Americas. Belgrano and Bernardino Rivadavia were sent to Europe to seek support for the United Provinces from both Spain and Britain. They sought to promote the crowning of Francisco de Paula, son of Charles IV of Spain, as regent of the United Provinces, but in the end he refused to act against the interests of the King of Spain. The diplomatic mission failed, but Belgrano learned of changes in ideology that had taken place in Europe since his previous visit. With the influence of the French Revolution, there had been a great consensus for making republican governments. After the government of Napoleon I, monarchies were preferred again, but in the form of constitutional monarchies, such as in Britain. He also noticed that the European powers approved of the South American revolutions, but the approval was compromised when the countries started to fall into anarchy.

When the emissaries returned to Buenos Aires, the government was worried by the defeats of Rondeau at Sipe Sipe and the political stir generated by José Gervasio Artigas and Estanislao López. Alvarez Thomas appointed Belgrano to head the army at Rosario, but shortly afterwards Thomas resigned. Pueyrredón became the new Supreme Director. With the signing of the Santo Tomé pact, the aforementioned army was retired from Rosario. Belgrano was then sent back to take command of the Army of the North, with the strong support of San Martín. "In the case of designating who must replace Rondeau, I am decided for Belgrano; he is the most methodical man of all whom I know in America; he is full of integrity and natural talent. He may not have the military knowledge of a Moreau or a Bonaparte as far as the army is concerned, but I think he is the best we have in South America".

Belgrano met with the Congress of Tucuman on 6 July 1816 to explain the results of his diplomatic mission in Europe. He thought that enacting a local monarchy would help to prevent anarchy, which would not end simply with independence from Spain. He felt a declaration of independence would be more easily accepted by the European powers if it created a monarchic system. To this end he formulated the Inca Plan: a monarchy ruled by a noble of the Inca civilisation. He thought that this would generate support from the indigenous populations as well, and repair the actions taken against the Inca by the Spanish colonisation. This proposal was supported by San Martín, Güemes, the deputies from the Upper Peru, and other provinces, but it found a strong rejection from Buenos Aires; they would not accept Cuzco as the capital city. On 9 July the Congress finally signed the Declaration of Independence from Spain. The flag created by Belgrano, which was being used without a law regulating it, was accepted as the national flag. The Inca Plan was still under discussion, but the Congress delayed it due to several states of emergency in the provinces caused by the war.

In August Belgrano again took command of the Army of the North, but with very limited people and resources. He was ordered to avoid trying to advance against the royalists in the north and was to stay in a defensive state at Tucumán. With Güemes in Salta, his task was to prevent the Royalists from moving to the south. The Supreme Director Pueyrredón was supporting an alternative plan designed by José de San Martín: create the Army of the Andes at Cuyo and, after making the Crossing of the Andes, defeat the royalists in Chile, get control of the Chilean navy, and attack the royalist stronghold of Lima with it.

=== Last years ===
In 1819 Buenos Aires was at war with José Gervasio Artigas and Estanislao López and requested San Martín and Belgrano to return with their armies to take part in the conflict. San Martín refused to do so, but Belgrano accepted. However, before his arrival the governors Estanislao López and Juan José Viamonte signed an eight-day truce to start peace negotiations. Belgrano's health was in a very bad state by this point, but he refused to resign, thinking that the morale of the Army would suffer without his presence. He moved to the frontier between Santa Fe and Córdoba, from where he would be able to move to either the litoral or the north if needed. His health continued to worsen, and he was given an unlimited leave from work by the Supreme Director. He handed command to Fernández de la Cruz and moved to Tucumán, where he met his daughter Manuela Mónica, just one year old. The governor of Tucuman, Feliciano de la Motta, was deposed during his stay, and Belgrano was taken prisoner. Abraham González led the uprising and attempted to put Belgrano into a shrew's fiddle, but Belgrano's doctor Josef Redhead objected, because of his delicate health, and his sentence was changed to simple imprisonment. When Bernabé Araoz took control of the government of Tucumán, Belgrano was immediately released.

He returned to Buenos Aires, to his parents' house. By that time the Battle of Cepeda had ended the authority of the Supreme Directors, starting the period known as Anarchy of the year 20. On 20 June 1820, at the age of 50, Belgrano died of dropsy. Due to his poverty, as the war consumed all his old wealth, he paid his doctor with his clock and his carriage, some of the few possessions he still had. As requested, he was shrouded into the robes of the Dominican Order and buried in the Santo Domingo convent. Before dying, Belgrano said "Ay, Patria mía" (in Spanish, "Oh, my Fatherland").

Due to the state of anarchy being experienced by the city, Belgrano's death was largely unnoticed. The only newspaper of the time to note his death was El Despertador Teofilantrópico, written by Francisco de Paula Castañeda, and there was no government representation at his funeral. Former students of his educative institutions would arrive in the following days with obsequies, when the news started to be known. The following year the political context was less chaotic and Bernardino Rivadavia, who was minister by then, organised a massive state funeral.

In 1902, during the presidency of Julio Argentino Roca, Belgrano's body was exhumed from the atrium of Santo Domingo, to be moved into a mausoleum. This was done on 4 September, by a government commission which included Dr. Joaquín V. González (ministry of interior), Pablo Riccheri (ministry of war), Gabriel L. Souto (president of the commission), Fray Modesto Becco (from the convent), Carlos Vega Belgrano and coronel Manuel Belgrano (descendants of Belgrano), Dr. Armando Claros (subsecretary of the Interior), Dr. Marcial Quiroga (Health Inspector of the Army), Dr. Carlos Malbrán (president of the National Department of Health), Coronel Justo Domínguez, and doctors Luis Peluffo and C. Massot (Arsenal of War). The exhumation revealed a number of preserved bones, pieces of wood, and nails. The bones were placed on a silver plate, and the following day there was a great controversy in the press: the newspaper La Prensa announced that Joaquín V. González and Riccheri had stolen a pair of teeth. Both were returned the following day. Gonzalez declared that he intended to show the tooth to his friends, and Riccheri that he took one to Belgrano's biographer, Bartolomé Mitre.

== Personal life ==
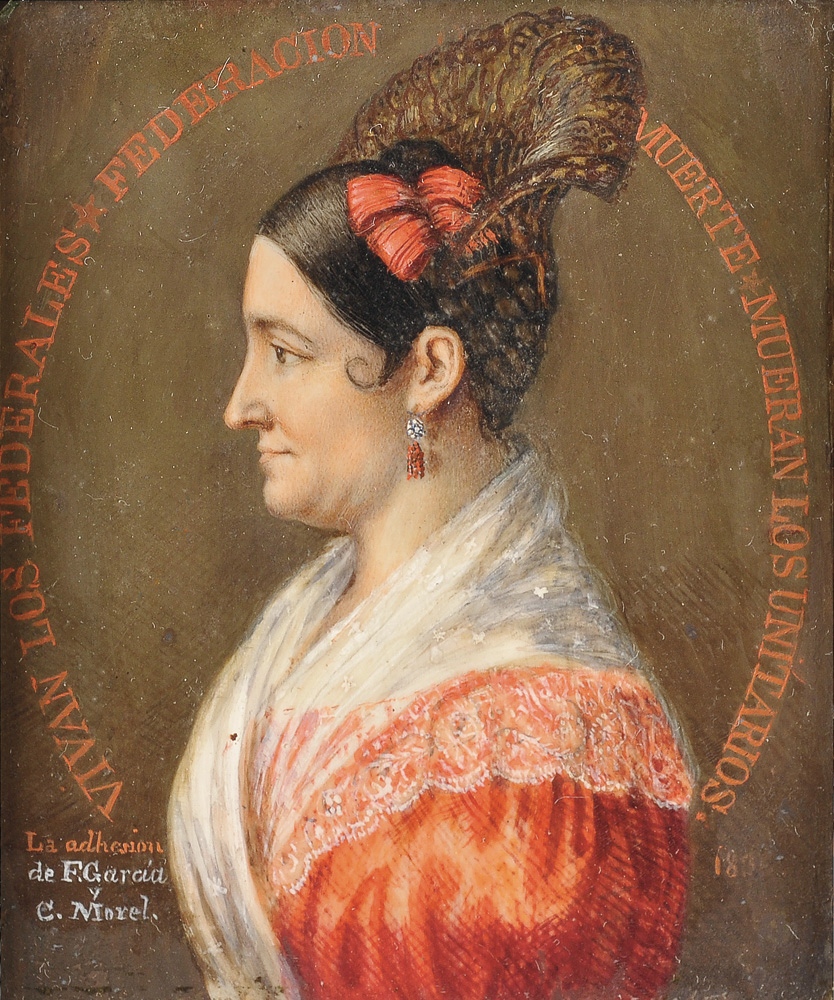
Encarnación Ezcurra, sister of Manuel Belgrano's fiancée, adopted Belgrano's son.

Manuel Belgrano met María Josefa Ezcurra, sister of Encarnación Ezcurra, at the age of 22. Her father, Juan Ignacio Ezcurra, did not approve of their relationship because of the bankruptcy of Domingo Belgrano, Manuel's father. Juan Ignacio arranged the wedding of his daughter with Juan Esteban Ezcurra, a distant relative from Pamplona that worked selling clothes. Juan Ignacio opposed the May Revolution and returned to Spain, leaving his wife in Buenos Aires, which allowed her to return to her former relationship with Belgrano.

When Belgrano was dispatched to Upper Peru, María Josefa followed him to Jujuy. She took part in the Jujuy Exodus and saw the battle of Tucumán. It is thought that she was pregnant by this time. Her son, Pedro Pablo, was born on 30 July 1813. Pedro Pablo was adopted by Encarnación Ezcurra and her husband, Juan Manuel de Rosas, who she had married shortly before.

Belgrano also met María Dolores Helguero in Tucumán, and briefly considered getting married, but the war forced a postponement. María Dolores married another man; the relationship ended but was briefly restarted in 1818. While he was near the frontiers of Córdoba, Santa Fe, and Buenos Aires, and in a delicate state of health, he learned that María Dolores had given birth to his daughter, Manuela Mónica del Sagrado Corazón, who was born on 4 May 1819.

Neither of these children were recognised by Belgrano in his will, where he said he had no children. However, it is thought that he did not mention them in order to protect their mothers, as both children were the result of relations that the moral standards of the society of the day would not have accepted. Nevertheless, he requested that his brother, Joaquín Eulogio Estanislao Belgrano, who was appointed as his heir, should look after his newborn daughter.

Like many other nineteenth century Argentines prominent in public life, Belgrano was a freemason. Despite this, he was a devout Catholic and a member of the Third Order of Saint Dominic.

=== Diseases ===
There are no records of diseases experienced by Belgrano during his youth or adolescence. His first illness dates from the time of his return to Buenos Aires, when he worked in the consulate; he experienced symptoms of syphilis caught during his stay in Spain. He was treated by the most prestigious physicians of the city: Miguel O'Gorman, related to Camila O'Gorman, from the Protomedicato of Buenos Aires, Miguel García de Rojas, and José Ignacio de Arocha. This disease forced him to take long leaves from his work at the consulate and take repose stays at Maldonado and San Isidro. He was treated with salts and iodines, and his condition eventually improved. It is also suspected that he may have had rheumatism. By the year 1800 he had a growing lacrimal fistula in one of his eyes and was invited by the King to move to Spain for a cure. He was offered a one-year leave with paid wages, but he rejected it, giving priority to his work for the nation over his own personal health. The fistula would later stabilise at a safe and unnoticeable size.

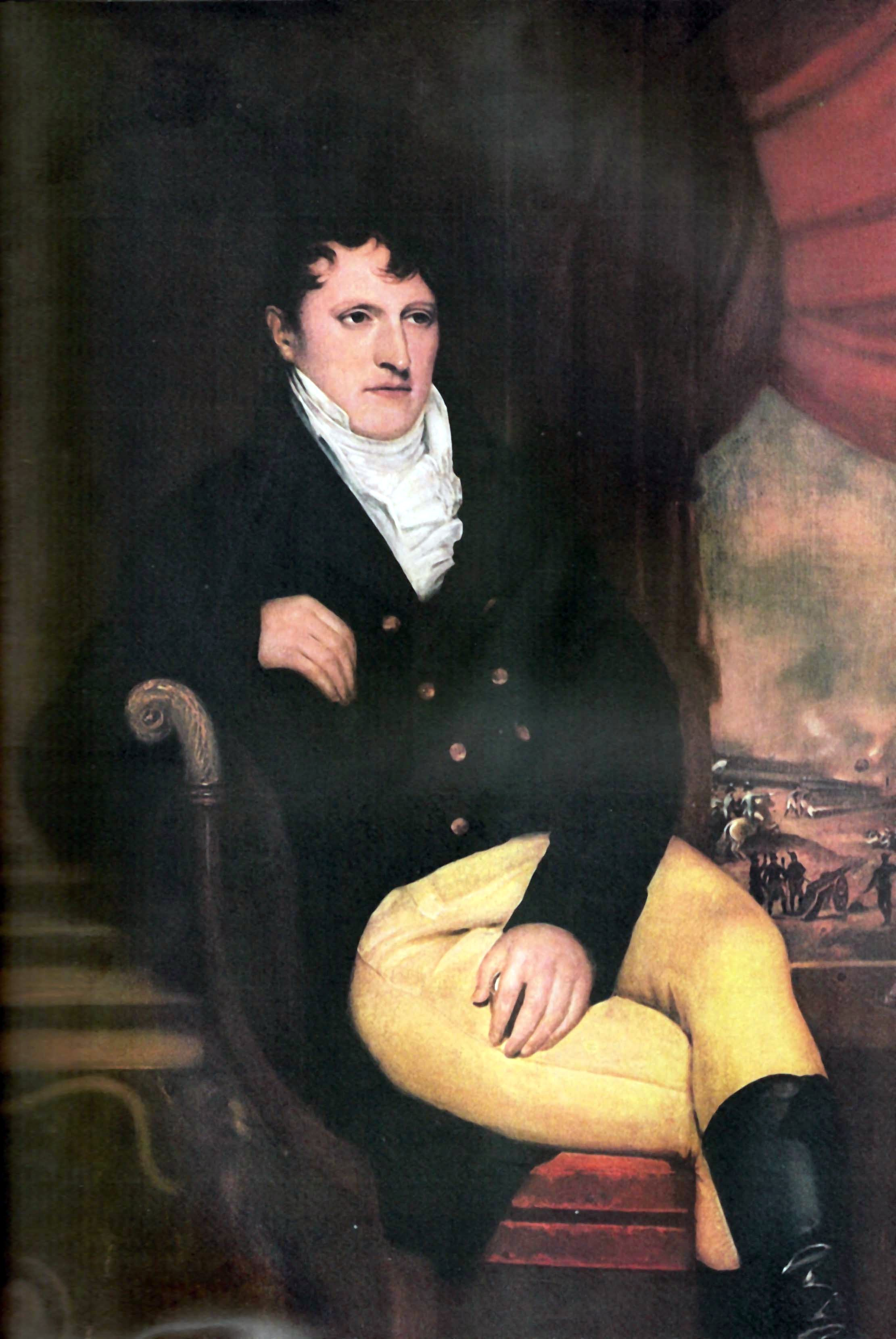
Portrait of Manuel Belgrano by Casimir Carbonnier made during Belgrano's diplomatic mission to London (1815)

During his military career he had blood vomits, such as before the Battle of Salta; he was almost too ill to participate in the battle. It is thought that those vomits originated in the digestive system and were caused by stress, and not in the respiratory system, because the vomits were sporadic, the condition did not become chronic, and it eventually cured itself. Nothing was revealed in the autopsy.

Belgrano also experienced paludism (malaria) during the second campaign to Upper Peru. On 3 May 1815 he informed the government of his disease, which made it difficult for him to work or even talk. He was treated by doctor Joseph Readhead, who employed a local species of the Cinchona medicinal plant. The disease lasted up to his stay in Britain, when his health improved because of the treatment and by having left the endemic zone.

He also experienced stomach disease, having a low production of gastric acids. This was worsened by harsh military conditions, including long periods with little food. The first references to the disease that would lead to his death, a case of edema, are from a year before, in a letter directed to Álvarez Thomas. He declared having problems in the chest, a lung, and his right leg. A later letter to Sarratea confirmed his situation and specified that it started on 23 April 1819. The gravity of his condition led the doctor Francisco de Paula Rivero to diagnose an advanced dropsy. Belgrano returned to Buenos Aires, where he died. He was embalmed by Joseph Redhead and Juan Sullivan. Sullivan performed the autopsy; it revealed high levels of fluid in multiple edemas and a tumor in the right epigastrium. The liver and spleen had grown beyond normal levels, there were hamartomas in the kidneys, and problems with the lungs and heart.

=== Family tree ===
==== Father's side ====
Pompeyo Belgrano (married to Marina Belgrano)
Agustín Belgrano y Belgrano	Carlos Matías Belgrano y Belgrano (married to Juana del Giúdice)	María Virginia Belgrano y Belgrano
Rogelio Belgrano del Giúdice	Francisco Belgrano del Giúdice (married to Ana Bianchi)	Tomás
Carlos Félix Belgrano Bianchi (married to María Josefina Berio)
Juan Bautista Belgrano Berio	Carlos Nicolás Félix Belgrano Berio (married to María Gentile Peri Tiragalo)	Francisco Belgrano Berio
Juan Agustín María Belgrano Peri	Domingo Francisco Cayetano Belgrano Peri	Nicolás Ambrosio Belgrano Peri

==== Mother's side ====
José de Islas
José Baltasar de Islas	Lucía de Islas y Alba	Juan de Islas	Juana de Islas
Gregoria González Islas	Juan José Gonzalez Islas (married to María Inés Casero Ramírez)	José González Islas
María Josefa González Islas y Casero

== Works ==
=== Political thought ===
Manuel Belgrano had a vast intellectual awareness of most important topics of his age. He studied in Europe during the Atlantic Revolutions, and was a versatile polyglot, capable of understanding Spanish, English, French, Italian, and some indigenous languages. This allowed him to read many influential books of the Age of Enlightenment, and understand the social, economic, technical, educative, political, cultural, and religious changes that were being prompted by the new ideas. He helped to promote those ideas using the press and with his work in the consulate. He rejected localist perspectives, favouring a Latin Americanist one. He was driven by the concept of the common good, which he regarded as an ethical value. He considered public health, education, and work as part of the common good, as well as religion. He did not share completely the ideas of the French Revolution, but instead the tempered ones of the Spanish Enlightenment: most notably, he remained a monarchist and held strong religious beliefs, being Roman Catholic and a devotee of Marian theology. His monarchism was not a conservative one, as he agreed that the existing state of things should be modified, but not towards a republic as in France or the United States, but towards a constitutional monarchy, like in Britain.

In the economic fields, he was influenced by the principles of physiocracy, an economic doctrine that considered that nature was the source of wealth. As a result, much of his works and reform proposals at the consulate were oriented towards improving agriculture, livestock, manufacturing, and free trade. He maintained a fluent contact with the consulates of other cities, developing a view of the viceroyalty as a whole. This led to an increased work in cartography of the largely unpopulated areas of the territory; the maps designed during this period would later prove a great help for José de San Martín during the Crossing of the Andes. He introduced new crops and promoted the use of local fauna for livestock production. He protected the weaving industry by increasing the production of cotton in Cochabamba, as he considered the local crop to be of similar quality to the cotton from Europe.

=== Promotion of education ===
Manuel Belgrano was one of the first politicians to advocate the development of an important educative system. He did so at the first report he made as head of the Consulate of Commerce, suggesting the creating of schools of agriculture and commerce. A school of agriculture would teach about important topics such as crop rotation, the specific ways to work with each crop, methods of seeding and harvesting, preservation of seeds, and identification of pests. Until that time, the only previous attempts to teach agriculture was done by the Jesuits, who were banished in 1767.

He was not only concerned with higher education, but also with primary education, and promoted the creation of free schools for poor children. In those schools, students would learn to read and learn basic maths and the catechism. He thought that this would help to raise people willing to work and reduce laziness.

He also promoted the creation of schools for women, where they would learn about weaving, as well as reading. However, he did not aim to generate intellectual women, but just to prevent ignorance and laziness, and have them learn things valuable for daily living. Being a strong Catholic himself, he was aligned with the Catholic perspective that rejected mixed-sex education, in contrast with Protestantism.

His concern with public education was not interrupted by his military campaigns. In 1813 he was rewarded with 40,000 pesos for his victories at Salta and Tucumán, an amount that would equal almost 80 gold kilograms. Belgrano rejected taking the prize money for himself, considering that a patriot should not seek money or wealth. He gave it back to the XIII year Assembly, with instructions to build primary schools at Tarija, Jujuy, San Miguel de Tucumán, and Santiago del Estero. He laid out a series of instructions about the methods and requirements for the selection of the teachers. However, the schools were not built, and by 1823 Bernardino Rivadavia declared that the money was lost; Juan Ramón Balcarce included it in the debt of the Buenos Aires province a decade later.

=== Translations ===
The historian Bartolomé Mitre stated that Manuel Belgrano held a deep admiration for George Washington, leader of the American Revolution and first President of the United States. Because of this, he worked on a translation of George Washington's Farewell Address into the Spanish language. He started working on it during the Paraguay Campaign, but before the battle of Tacuarí he destroyed all his papers, including the unfinished translation, to prevent them from falling into enemy hands. Belgrano resumed work on it afterwards and finished it before the Battle of Salta. He sent it to Buenos Aires for publication. George Washington's Farewell Address is considered, along with Gettysburg Address, one of the most important texts in the history of the United States. It talks about the importance of keeping national unity as the key to maintain independence, prosperity, and freedom—ideas that were shared by Belgrano regarding the population of Hispanic America.

== Legacy ==
Belgrano is considered one of the greatest heroes in Argentina's history. His face has regularly graced bank notes, postage stamps and memorabilia, his name gracing important city landmarks across the country (see below). National Flag Day is celebrated every year on 20 June. in honor of his death.

In 1873 a bronze equestrian statue of Belgrano by the French sculptor Albert-Ernest Carrier-Belleuse was erected through public subscription at the Plaza de Mayo (in front of the future Casa Rosada) in Buenos AIres, and in 1903 an expensive mausoleum that received his ashes by the Italian sculptor Ettore Ximenes at the atrium of the nearby Santo Domingo Convent, featuring larger than life angels supporting an elaborate casket flanked by the two allegorical figures of Thought and Action and reliefs depicting the battles of Tucuman and Salta (in 2023 the mausoleum underwent a thorough restoration).

In 1910 a large monument was erected at the site of the Battle of Salta, the work of the Catalan sculptor Torquat Tasso, topped by a bronze allegory of Liberty and life-size statues of Belgrano holding the flag and his officers Dorrego, Díaz Vélez and Zelaya. The monument is flanked by bronze condors and reliefs by noted Argentinian artist Lola Mora.

A large monument complex (Monumento Nacional a la Bandera, National Flag Memorial) was built in 1957 in honour of the flag in Rosario, showcasing monumental architecture, statuary and reliefs by prominent Argentinian artists of the era architect Alejandro Bustillo and sculptors José Fioravanti, Alfredo Bigatti and Eduardo Barnes, including a large bronze statue of Belgrano. The Flag Memorial and the park that surround it are the seat of national celebrations every Flag Day.

Jujuy Province is declared the honorary capital of Argentina each 23 August since 2002, in reference to the Jujuy Exodus.

The cruiser ARA General Belgrano, which was sunk during the Falklands War, was named after him, as was the earlier 1896 ARA General Belgrano, and Puerto Belgrano, which is the largest base of the Argentinian navy. A small town in the province of Córdoba, Argentina, Villa General Belgrano, also bears his name, as well as many other small towns and departments. Central Avenida Belgrano in the City of Buenos Aires and part of the avenue that leads to the Flag Memorial in Rosario (also Avenida Belgrano) bear his name. Additionally, there is an important northern neighbourhood within Buenos Aires city that carries the name Belgrano.

In the museum Casa de la Libertad at Sucre, Bolivia, there is an Argentine flag, protected by a glass case and in a deteriorated condition, which they claim to be the original one raised by Belgrano for first time in 1812. The ensign was one of two abandoned and hidden inside a small church near Macha after the battle of Ayohuma, during the retreat from Upper Peru in 1813. The other flag was given back to Argentina by the Bolivian authorities in 1896.

In Genoa, Italy, there is a commemorative statue of Belgrano, at the end of the Corso Buenos Aires.

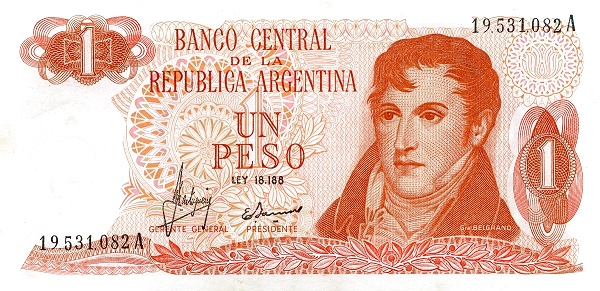
Manuel Belgrano on an Argentine peso bank note (1970)

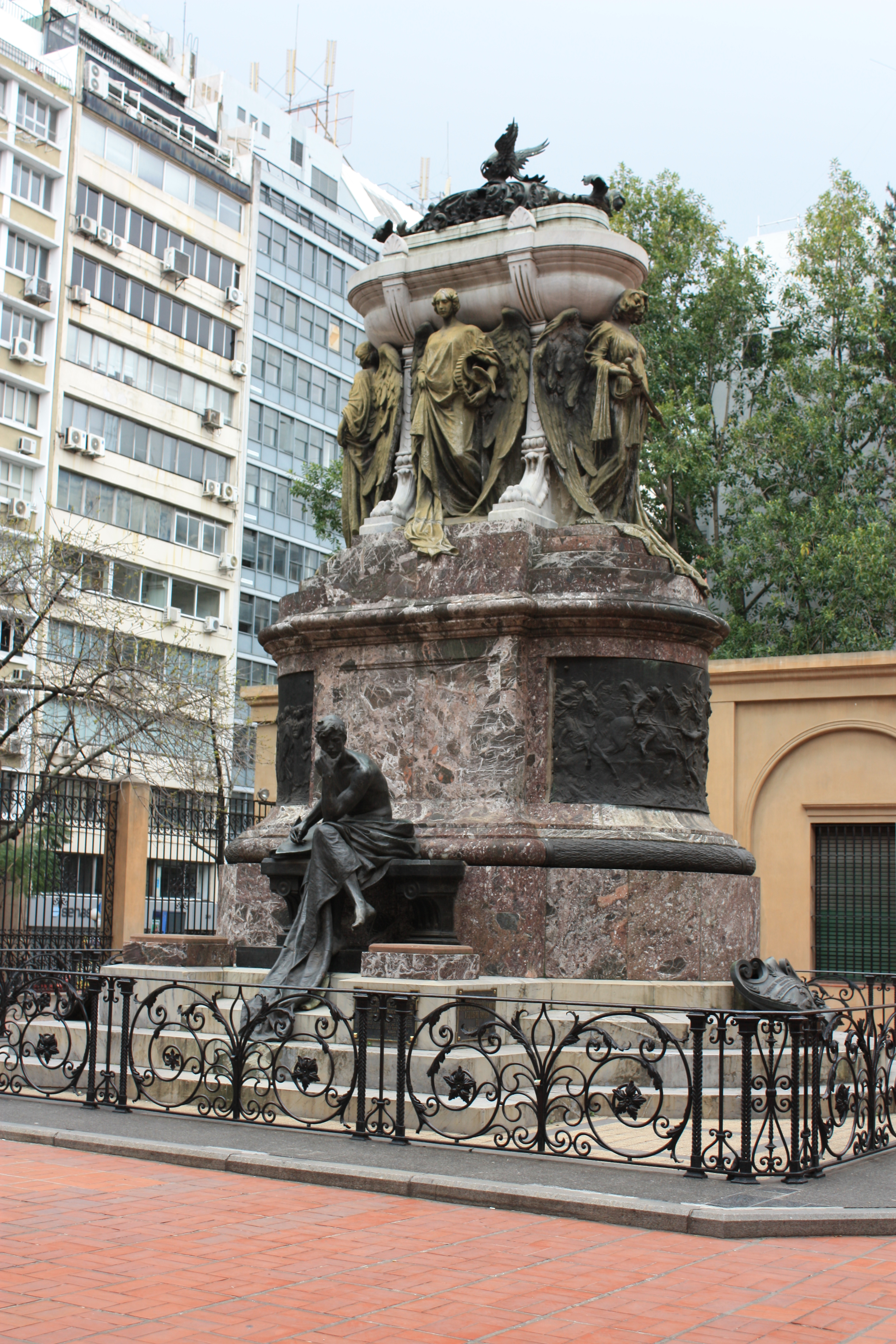
Mausoleum of Manuel Belgrano, at the Santo Domingo convent in downtown Buenos Aires, work of the Italian sculptor Ettore Ximenes (1903).

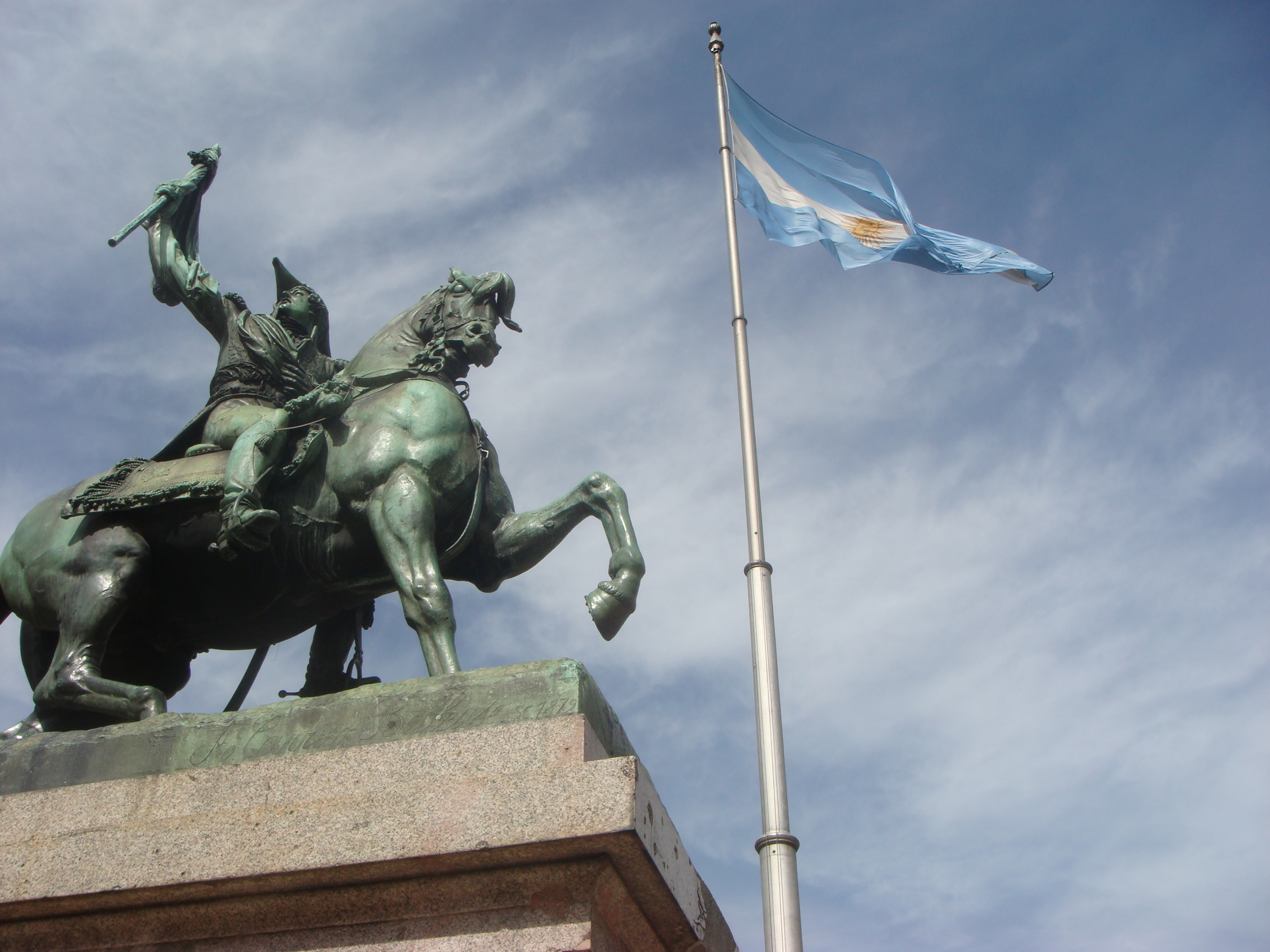
Belgrano's monument in Plaza de Mayo Square, Buenos Aires.
Sculptor: Albert-Ernest Carrier-Belleuse

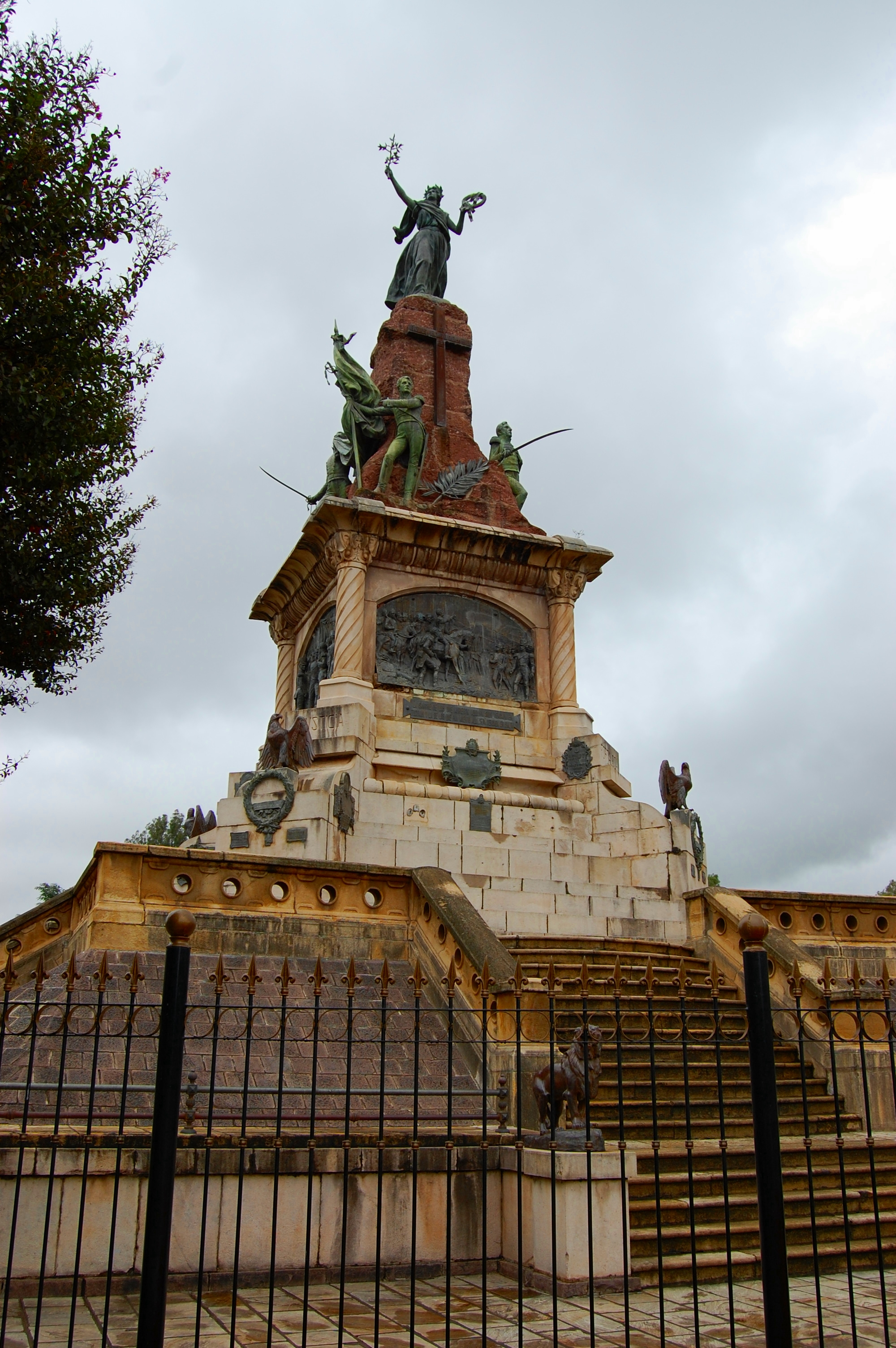
Monument at the site of the Battle of Salta inaugurated in 1910, The side reliefs are the work of famed Argentinian sculptor Lola Mora.

=== Historiography ===
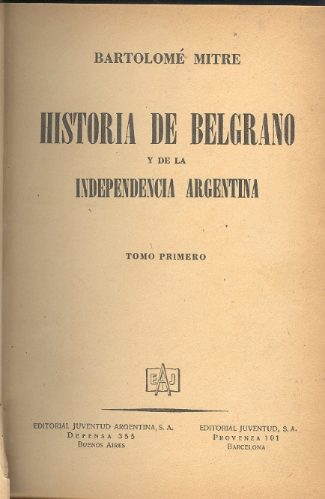
Historia de Belgrano y de la Independencia Argentina, biography of Manuel Belgrano written by Bartolomé Mitre

The first biography of Manuel Belgrano was his autobiography, which he wrote by the time he was stationed in Lujan. It long remained unpublished. His first biography written by someone else was "Bosquejo histórico del General Don Manuel Belgrano" (Historical stub on General Don Manuel Belgrano), authored by José Ignacio Álvarez Thomas. Álvarez Thomas wrote it during his exile at Colonia del Sacramento, and his work had a high political bias.

The historian Bartolomé Mitre wrote Historia de Belgrano y de la Independencia Argentina (Spanish: History of Belgrano and of the Independence of Argentina), whose scope expanded on the simple biography of Belgrano himself and detailed instead the Argentine War of Independence as a whole. The work followed the Great Man theory, linking the success in the war of independence to the figure of Belgrano and his natal Buenos Aires. This book included the autobiography of Belgrano as well, which was discovered by Mitre. The book was criticised by contemporary Argentine authors, such as Dalmacio Vélez Sarsfield and Juan Bautista Alberdi, born in other provinces, and Vicente Fidel López. Vélez Sarsfield dismissed the Great Man theory and maintained that the work of the other provinces for the Argentine independence was as important as that of Buenos Aires. He criticised the work of Mitre at "Rectificaciones históricas: General Belgrano, General Güemes" (Historical rectifications: General Belgrano, General Güemes) which dealt with Martín Miguel de Güemes as well, and Mitre would answer at "Estudios históricos sobre la Revolución de Mayo: Belgrano y Güemes" (Historical studies about the May Revolution: Belgrano and Güemes). Both books were written in 1864. Vicente López provided a biography of Belgrano from a different angle, his book was "Debate histórico, refutaciones a las comprobaciones históricas sobre la Historia de Belgrano" (Historical debate, rebuttals to the historical checkings about the history of Belgrano), and Mitre replied with "Nuevas comprobaciones sobre historia argentina" (New checkings about the history of Argentina). López considered history as an art form, and Mitre considered it a science, rejecting historical narrations that could not be backed by primary sources. These disputes about Belgrano are considered the starting point of the Historiography of Argentina. Historiographical studies of Manuel Belgrano are currently held by the Belgranian National Institute.

=== Numismatics ===
Belgrano appears on a number of currencies in the numismatic history of Argentina. He appeared for the first time on the banknotes of 1, 5, and 10 pesos according to the Peso Ley 18.188, in effect from 1970 to 1983. He was later included on the 10,000 peso banknotes of the pesos argentinos, the highest banknote value in circulation. The Argentine austral had a number of political and military figures that did not include Belgrano, but later the 10,000 pesos argentinos banknotes were allowed to be used as australes. The current Argentine peso displays Belgrano on 10-peso banknote. The 1997 and 2002 series only modified small details.

== Bibliography ==
- Belgrano, Manuel; Felipe Pigna (2009). Autobiografía y escritos económicos (in Spanish). Buenos Aires: Emecé Edition. ISBN 978-950-04-3189-7.
- Belgrano, Mario (1944). Hombres representativos de la Historia Argentina: Belgrano (in Spanish). Argentina: National Academy of History of Argentina.
- Chasteen, John Charles (2008). Americanos: Latin America's struggle for independence. United States: Oxford University Press. ISBN 978-0-19-517881-4.
- Aníbal Jorge Luzuriaga. "Manuel Belgrano" (in Spanish). Argentina: Belgranian National Institute.
- Galasso, Norberto (2004). Mariano Moreno, "El sabiecito del sur" (in Spanish). Argentina: Colihue. ISBN 950-581-799-1.
- Lagleyze, Julio Luqui (2010). Grandes biografías de los 200 años: Manuel Belgrano (in Spanish). Argentina: Clarín. ISBN 978-987-07-0837-7.
- Luna, Félix (2004). Grandes protagonistas de la Historia Argentina: Manuel Belgrano (in Spanish). Argentina: Grupo Editorial Planeta. ISBN 950-49-1247-8.
- Macintyre, Stuart (2011). The Oxford History of Historical Writing. United States: Oxford University Press. ISBN 978-0-19-953309-1.
- Saavedra, Cornelio (2009). Memoria autógrafa (in Spanish). Argentina: Editorial del Nuevo Extremo. ISBN 978-987-609-171-8.
- Saldaña, Juan José (2006). Science in Latin America. United States: University of Texas Press. ISBN 978-0-292-71271-3.
- Scenna, Miguel Ángel (2009). Mariano Moreno (in Spanish). Argentina: H. Garetto Editor. ISBN 978-987-1494-05-4.
- Shumway, Nicolas (1991). The Invention of Argentina. Berkeley and Los Angeles, California: University of California Press. ISBN 0-520-08284-2.
