= Later life of José de San Martín =

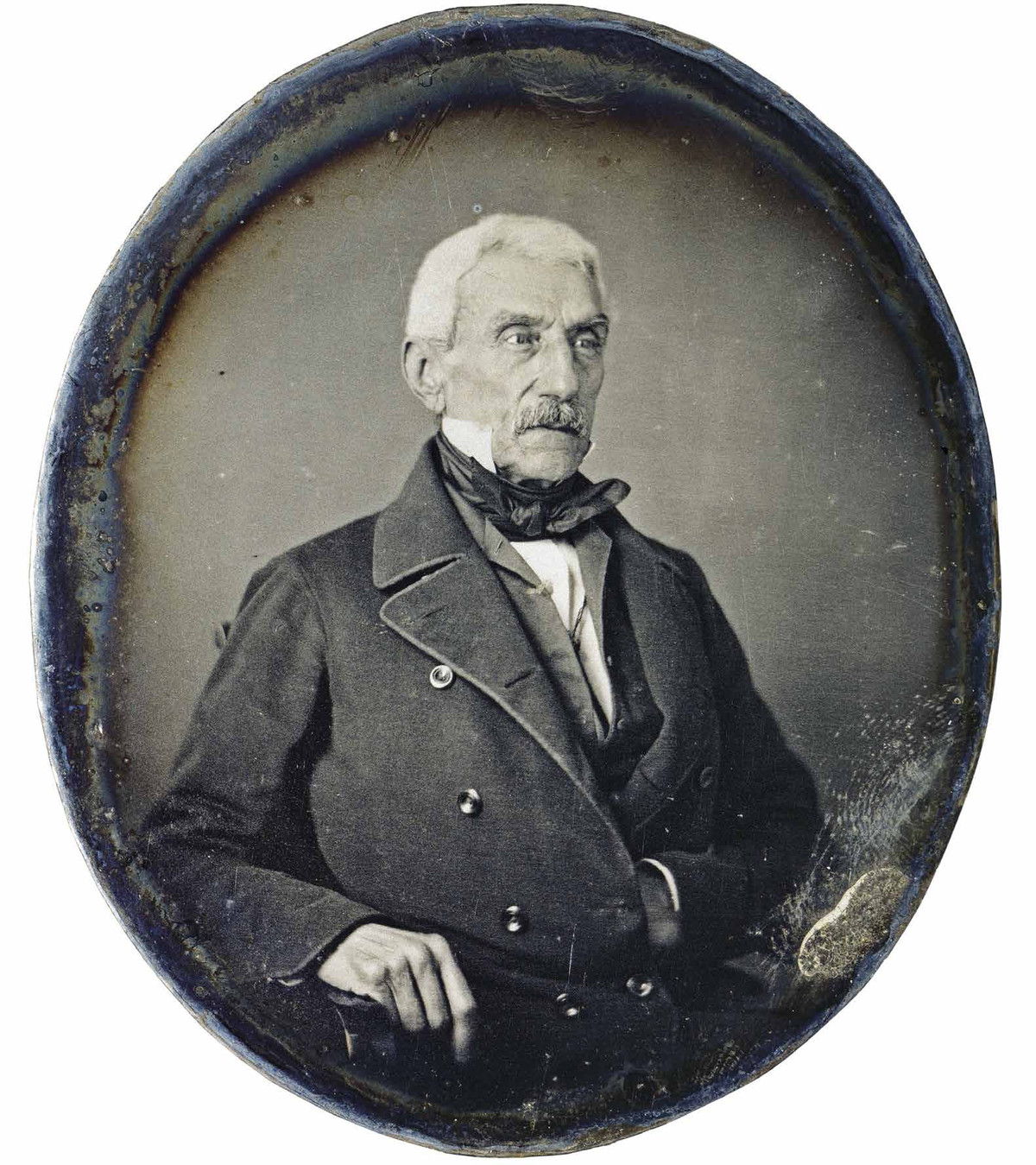
Photo of José de San Martín, taken in 1848

The later life of José de San Martín (national hero of Argentina) documents the life of San Martín after his retirement from the Spanish American wars of independence. He met Simón Bolívar at the Guayaquil conference, resigned from his political offices in Peru and handed him the command of the Army of the Andes. San Martín returned to Argentina, and then left for Europe. He spent his later life in France, and died in Boulogne-sur-Mer on August 17, 1850.

== Departure ==
After his retirement, San Martín intended to live in Cuyo, modern Argentina. The Argentine theater of the Spanish American wars of independence had ended, and by that point the conflict was restricted to northern South America. However, the Argentine Civil Wars had begun, between the unitarians, who wanted to organize the country as a unitary state centered on Buenos Aires, and the federals, who preferred a federation of provinces. San Martín had good relations with the federal caudillos Juan Bautista Bustos, Estanislao López and Facundo Quiroga, and a personal feud with the unitarian leader Bernardino Rivadavia. However, he tried to stay neutral in the conflict. López offered him his military support to depose the government of Buenos Aires, so that San Martín would rule instead, but he declined the offer. Aware of San Martín's influence, the government of Buenos Aires kept him under surveillance, intercepted his mail, and urged him to leave the country.

After San Martín's wife María de los Remedios de Escalada died in 1823, he returned to Buenos Aires. He wanted to take his daughter, María de las Mercedes, who was living with her mother's family, and spend some time with her in Europe, but the Escaladas did not give him a good reception. They resented the fact that he had not been present when Remedios died, and that he had refused to aid the city at the Battle of Cepeda. As the elections for a new governor were approaching, the government rushed through a law requiring that all candidates be natives of Buenos Aires, thus preventing San Martín from standing as he was born in Corrientes. San Martín left Buenos Aires and sailed to Europe.

== European visit ==
San Martín arrived in Le Havre, in France. The country was under the rule of Louis XVIII as a result of the Bourbon Restoration that followed the defeat of Napoleon. San Martín's books were deemed too liberal, so he was not allowed to enter the country. He therefore sailed on to Britain. He disembarked in Southampton and went to London. After a brief stay there, he moved to Brussels, where he enrolled his daughter in a school and stayed for some years. He joined the lodges "La Parfaite Amitié" and "Les Amis Philanthropes".

San Martín intended to stay in Brussels until his daughter finished her education and then retire to a farm in Argentina. During this time he got news of the final victory of Simón Bolívar in the war. He also received the news that the government of Buenos Aires had disbanded the Regiment of Mounted Grenadiers, and that Bernardo Monteagudo had been assassinated in Peru. Rivadavia visited Brussels and San Martín intended to challenge him to a duel, but was dissuaded by Diego Paroissien.

== Attempted return ==
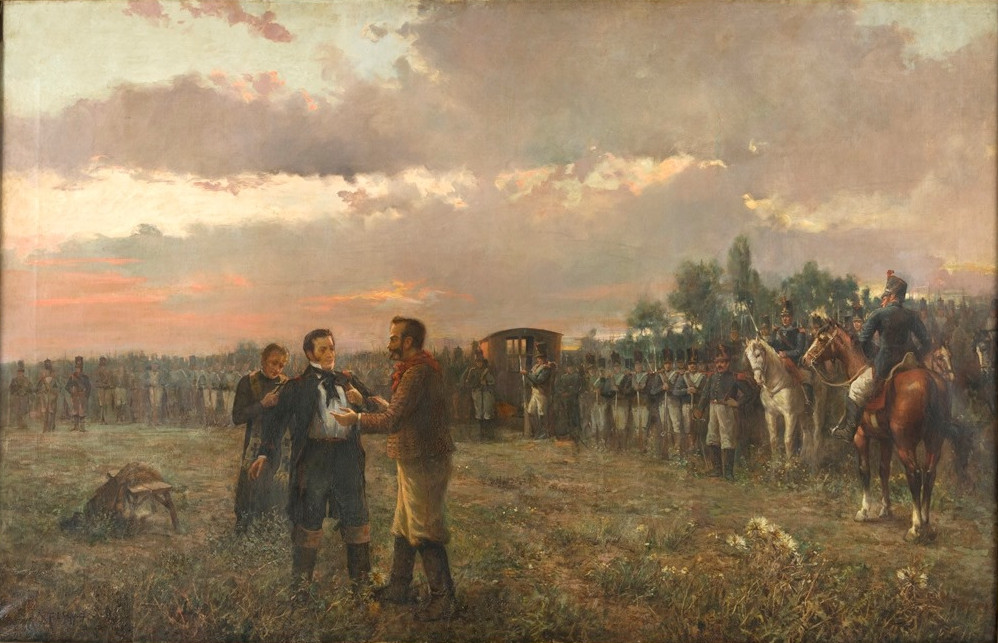
The execution of Manuel Dorrego convinced San Martín to return to Europe.

Brazil invaded and annexed the Banda Oriental in 1816. The Thirty-Three Orientals began the liberation of the province in 1825, which led to the Argentine-Brazilian War. Despite his feud with Rivadavia, San Martín wrote to Manuel Escalada instructing him to offer his military services to the government. He received no response; it is unclear whether Rivadavia rejected him or whether the Escaladas did not pass on his offer because of his known hostility toward San Martín. Rivadavia was ousted from power shortly after, as the provinces rejected the 1826 constitution, and Manuel Dorrego became head of government instead. This convinced San Martín to move back to the Americas, but the war ended during his journey home after British diplomacy forced Dorrego to sign the 1828 Treaty of Montevideo. San Martín had intended to return anyway, as a federal government would spare him the persecution he would otherwise have been subjected to from the unitarians.

San Martin's plans were disrupted after his ship docked in Rio de Janeiro (where he used the pseudonym "José Matorras") and learned that the unitarian Juan Lavalle had deposed Dorrego. When he reached Montevideo San Martin received news that Lavalle had captured and executed Dorrego, and begun a campaign of terror against all federals in the country. San Martin remained on board the ship after it docked in Buenos Aires, and returned with it to Montevideo. Lavalle was unable to put down the federal rebellion against him, and offered San Martín the government. The conditions of this offer, if any, are unknown. San Martín declined and returned to Europe.

== Return to Europe ==
San Martín returned to Brussels. He stayed in touch with the news from Europe and South America, and began to face economic problems. By this time the federal Juan Manuel de Rosas had begun to pacify the civil war started by Lavalle, and earned San Martín's admiration. They began to exchange letters, in friendly terms.

The Belgian Revolution against the Netherlands began in 1830. Lacking notable military leaders, the rebels requested San Martín to lead them, and offered him the command of their troops. He declined the offer, as when he settled in the country he had agreed to obey its laws. To avoid taking part in the conflict, he left Belgium and moved to Paris. He was also concerned by the cholera epidemic of 1831, but the disease was also present in Paris, where both San Martín and his daughter Mercedes became ill. They were helped by Mariano Balcarce. Mariano married Mercedes, and they had two daughters, María Mercedes and Josefa Dominga.

In 1837, France began a blockade of the Rio de la Plata against Rosas. San Martín offered his military services to Rosas, but Rosas declined the offer: he thought the conflict would be resolved quickly, and did not want to disturb San Martín at his advanced age. San Martín condemned the role of the unitarians in that conflict, as they had allied themselves with France against their own nation.

San Martín wrote his will on January 23, 1844. He declared his daughter his heir, and bequeathed his curved saber to Juan Manuel de Rosas. The conflict between France and Argentina renewed in the Anglo-French blockade of the Río de la Plata, which San Martín also condemned. During this time he met Florencio Varela and Domingo Faustino Sarmiento.

During the 1848 revolution, San Martin left Paris and moved to Boulogne-sur-Mer, a small city in northern France. He was almost blind and had many health problems because of his advanced age, but continued to write letters and keep in touch with the news from South America. He died at three o'clock on August 17, 1850, shortly after receiving news of the Argentine victory against the Anglo-French blockade.

== Bibliography ==
- Pigna, Felipe (2010). Libertadores de América. Buenos Aires: Planeta. ISBN 978-950-49-2420-3.
- Galasso, Norberto (2009). Seamos Libres y lo demás no importa nada. Buenos Aires: Colihue. ISBN 978-950-581-779-5.
