= Enrique Martinez =

Enrique Martinez or Enrique Martínez may refer to:

- Enrique Martínez (equestrian) (1930–2021), Spanish equestrian
- Enrique Martínez (politician) (1887–1938), Argentine politician
- Enrique Martínez y Martínez (born 1948), Mexican politician
- Enrique Martínez Dizido (1789–1870), Uruguayan military officer
- Enrique Martínez Heredia (born 1953), Spanish road bicycle racer
- Enrique González Martínez (1871–1952), Mexican poet and diplomat
- Enrique García Martínez, a.k.a. Kike, Spanish footballer
