= Curved saber of San Martín =

Historic saber

The curved saber of San Martín is a historic weapon used by José de San Martín.

== History ==
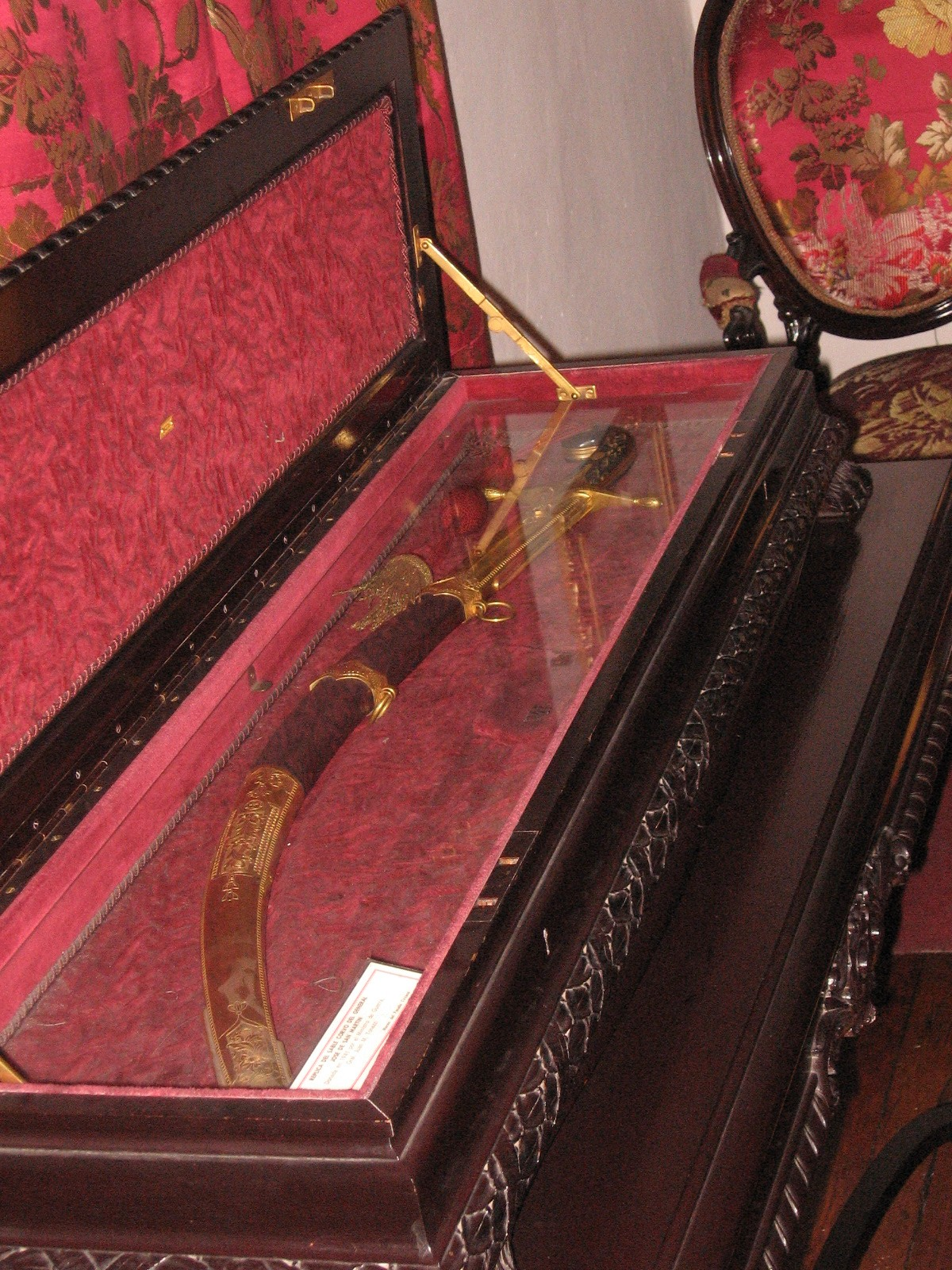
Replica of the curved saber, held in a museum of Mendoza

San Martín acquired the curved saber during his stay in London, shortly after he left Spain and before embarking for South America. Later, San Martin would arm his mounted grenadiers cavalry unit with similar weapons, which he deemed ideal for cavalry charges.

Following the withdrawal of San Martín to Europe, after the Guayaquil conference, the weapon remained in the city of Mendoza in the hands of a family friend. In a subsequent letter his son-in-law, Mariano Balcarce, was asked to send him the sword in Europe, and it remained in his possession until his death on August 17, 1850.

Before dying, San Martín bequeathed his sword to Governor Juan Manuel de Rosas. Mariano Balcarce wrote the following to give the news.

As his executor, and pursuant to his last will, it is my sad duty to inform Your Excellency this painful news, and the honor to inform Your Excellency the following provision in his will: "3rd The saber that has accompanied me throughout the War of Independence of South America will be handed to the General of the Argentine Republic, Don Juan Manuel de Rosas, as evidence of the satisfaction that as an Argentine I had when seeing the firmness with which he has held the honor of the Republic against the unjust pretensions of the foreigners who tried to humiliate her"

Rosas in turn bequeathed the sword to his friend Juan Nepomuceno Terrero, and after his death to his wife and then their sons and daughter in order of age. The sword thus passed into the possession of Maximo Terrero and Manuela Rosas after the death of Rosas, with Juan Terrero having died earlier.

In 1896 Adolfo Carranza, director of the National Historical Museum, requested of them the donation of the saber of San Martín, to which they acquiesced. It was sent back from London to Buenos Aires, arriving on 4 March 1897 to be kept in the National History Museum.

=== Theft ===
The sword remained there until 2 August 1963, when it was stolen by members of the Peronist Youth. It was recovered a few days later, and temporarily placed in the custody of the Mounted Grenadiers Regiment, until its return to the museum.

The sword was stolen again on 19 August 1965 and again recovered a few days later. At that time the Regiment was granted definitive custody and the sword was placed inside a screened gazebo which was built for the purpose, donated by the City of Buenos Aires. The curved saber has remained there since.
