= Enrique Martínez Dizido =

Argentinian military personnel (1789–1870)

General Enrique Martínez Dizido
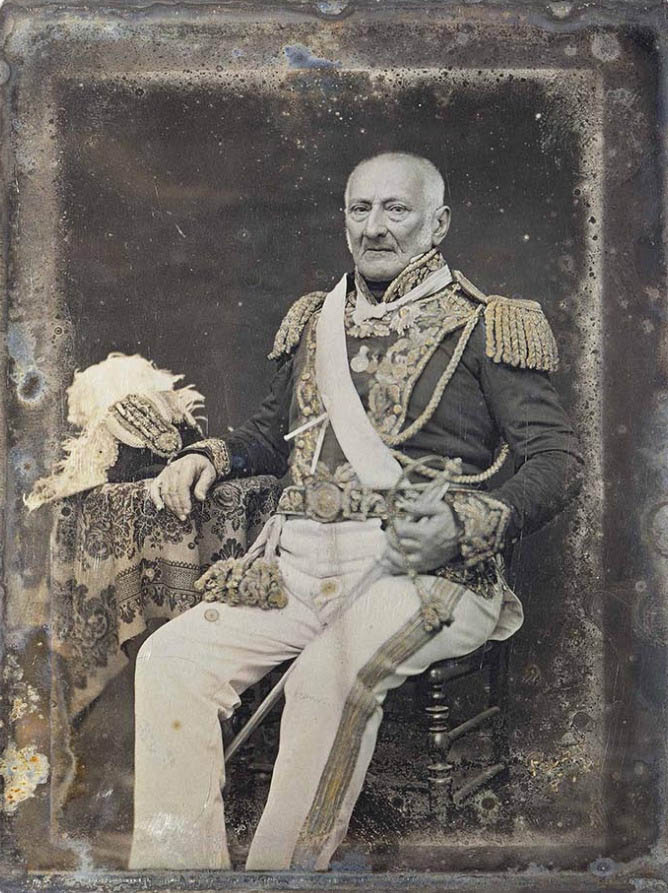
- General Enrique Martínez Dizido

Minister of War and Navy of Buenos Aires Province
- In office 1832–1833

Personal details
- Born: Enrique Santiago Martínez Dizido; 15 July 1789 Montevideo, Uruguay
- Died: 30 November 1870 (aged 81) Buenos Aires, Argentina
- Resting place: La Recoleta Cemetery
- Spouse(s): Francisca Antonia del Ríos Torres; Mercedes Ugarte
- Occupation: military man politician
- Profession: army

Military service
- Allegiance: Spain (until 1810) (Argentina) United Provinces of the River Plate
- Branch/service: Spanish Army; Argentine Army
- Years of service: 1806–1840s
- Unit: Army of the Andes
- Battles/wars: British invasions of the Río de la Plata; May Revolution; Argentine War of Independence; Chilean War of Independence; Peruvian War of Independence; Cisplatine War; Argentine Civil Wars

Enrique Martínez Dizido (15 July 1789 – 30 November 1870) was an Uruguayan politician and military man, who served during the Wars of Independence under General José de San Martín and Juan Gregorio de las Heras. He also took part in the war against Brazil and in the Civil Wars of Argentina.

He was born in Montevideo, Uruguay, the son of José Gaspar Martínez Fontes y Bustamante and María de los Ángeles Dizido y Zamudio, belonging to a distinguished family.
