= María de los Remedios de Escalada =

Wife of José de San Martín (1797–1823)

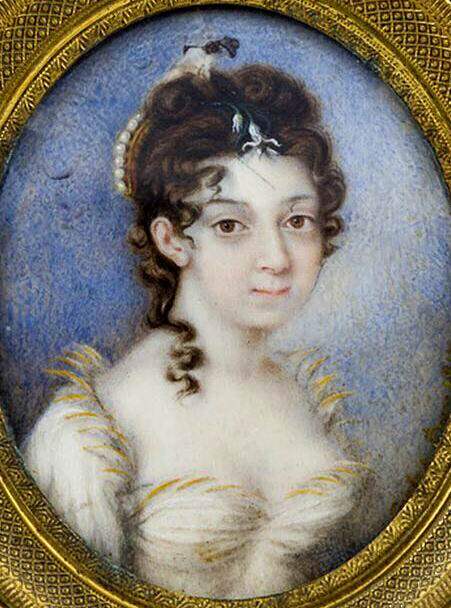
- Portrait of Escalada by Jean André Charles Durand
- Born: November 20, 1797; Buenos Aires, Viceroyalty of the Río de la Plata
- Died: August 3, 1823 (aged 25); Buenos Aires, United Provinces of the Río de la Plata
- Spouse: José de San Martín

María de los Remedios de Escalada y La Quintana (November 20, 1797 – August 3, 1823), commonly known as Remedios de Escalada, was the wife of the leader of the Argentine War of Independence, General José de San Martín.

== Life and times ==
She was born in Buenos Aires in 1797 to Tomasa de la Quintana y Aoiz and Antonio José de Escalada, members of the local gentry. The Escaladas were prominent in local commerce, and became supporters of the May Revolution of 1810, hosting numerous clandestine meetings before and after the events that led to the dissolution of the Viceroyalty of the Río de la Plata (a part of the Spanish Empire).

During this interim, she met José de San Martín, one of several generals from the Peninsular War who had recently moved to Buenos Aires. Most historians consider that they developed a love at first sight; however, the aristocratic stature of the Escalada, the social customs of the time and San Martín's own political agenda would suggest instead that it could be an arranged marriage between San Martín and the Escalada. With this marriage, the Escalada arranged ties with a general of a promising career, and San Martín could leave the social isolation of his recent move, getting ties with the aristocracy of the city. Even so, San Martin had conflicts with his political family, by rejecting their aristocratic ways. A dinner with Bernardino Rivadavia ended in an incident between them.

They married on September 12, 1812, in a private ceremony at the Buenos Aires cathedral. Remedios was aged 14 at that time, while San Martín declared being 31 years old, thus, born in 1781. However, those years are inconsistent with other ages declared by San Martín in his life, in his year of birth controversy, and it is likely that he declared being younger than he was, to reduce the age disparity between them.

San Martín's responsibilities at the helm of his recently formed Regiment of Mounted Grenadiers kept them separated in the ensuing months, however, and they would not be reunited until after San Martín's August 10, 1814, appointment as Governor of Mendoza Province.

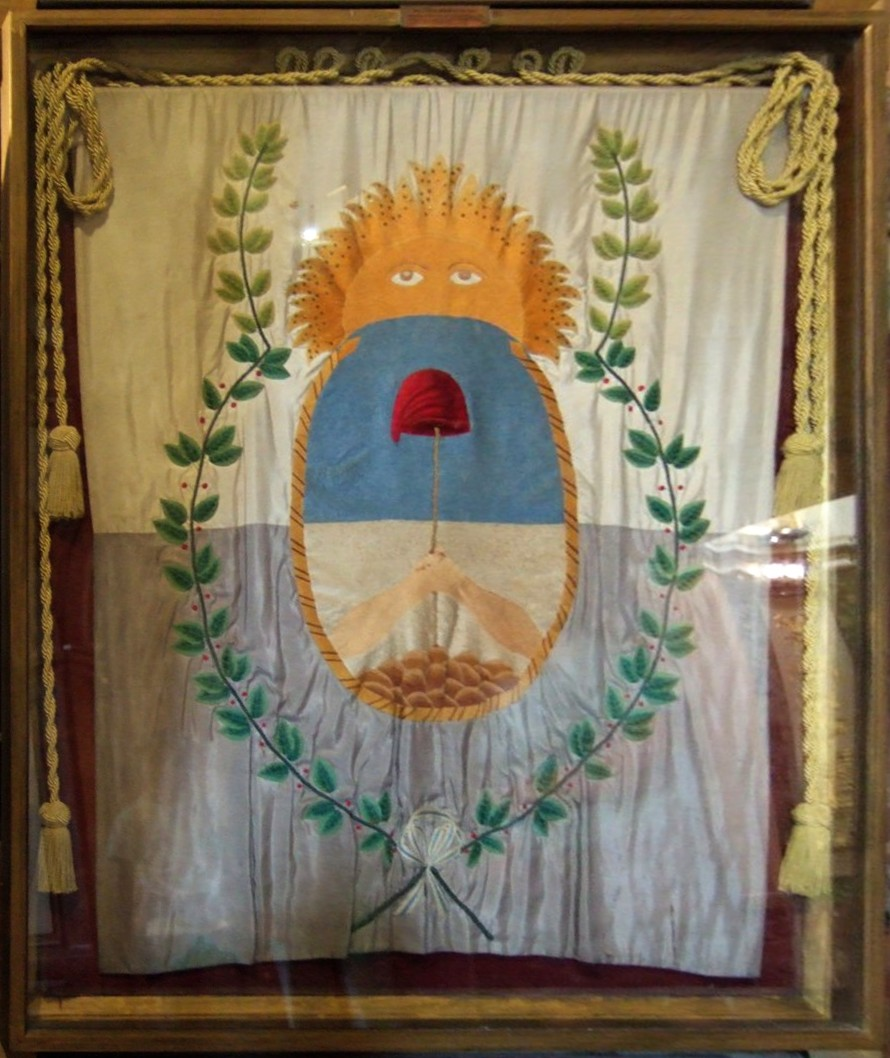
Replica of the banner designed by Sñra. San Martín for the Army of the Andes; it was later made the official flag of Mendoza Province.

Remedios collaborated in her husband's subsequent efforts to organize and fund the Army of the Andes, and on October 10, 1815, she presented the military leader with a collection of jewelry donated by Mendoza's high society (as well as her own) as a result of her efforts. She and a number of friends also designed the military unit's banner, after San Martín commented on his lack of one during a Christmas 1816 dinner. She gave birth to the couple's only child, Mercedes Tomasa San Martín y Escalada (1816 — 1875), on August 16 of that year.

San Martín's departure towards Chile as leader of the historic Crossing of the Andes in January 1817 again led to a prolonged separation from his wife. This burden was compounded by her developing tuberculosis in early 1819, and on March 24, her worsening state compelled her to return to Buenos Aires, where she expected to die. The commander of the Army of the North, General Manuel Belgrano, had General José María Paz escort her party for the 600 mile (970 km) journey, for the sake of protection against highwaymen and other perils.

Following his tenure from 1821 to 1822 as Head of State of the Protectorate of Peru, General San Martín returned to Mendoza and, in January 1823, planned to journey to Buenos Aires, where his wife lay bedridden. Misgivings in Buenos Aires towards the Liberator remained, however, from his 1820 refusal to intervene militarily on behalf of the besieged Directorate prior to their downfall. Receiving San Martín's petition for safe conduct in his journey to visit his dying wife, Minister of Government Bernardino Rivadavia refused. Undaunted, San Martín left for Buenos Aires, although upon his arrival, was informed that his wife had recently died; she was 25.

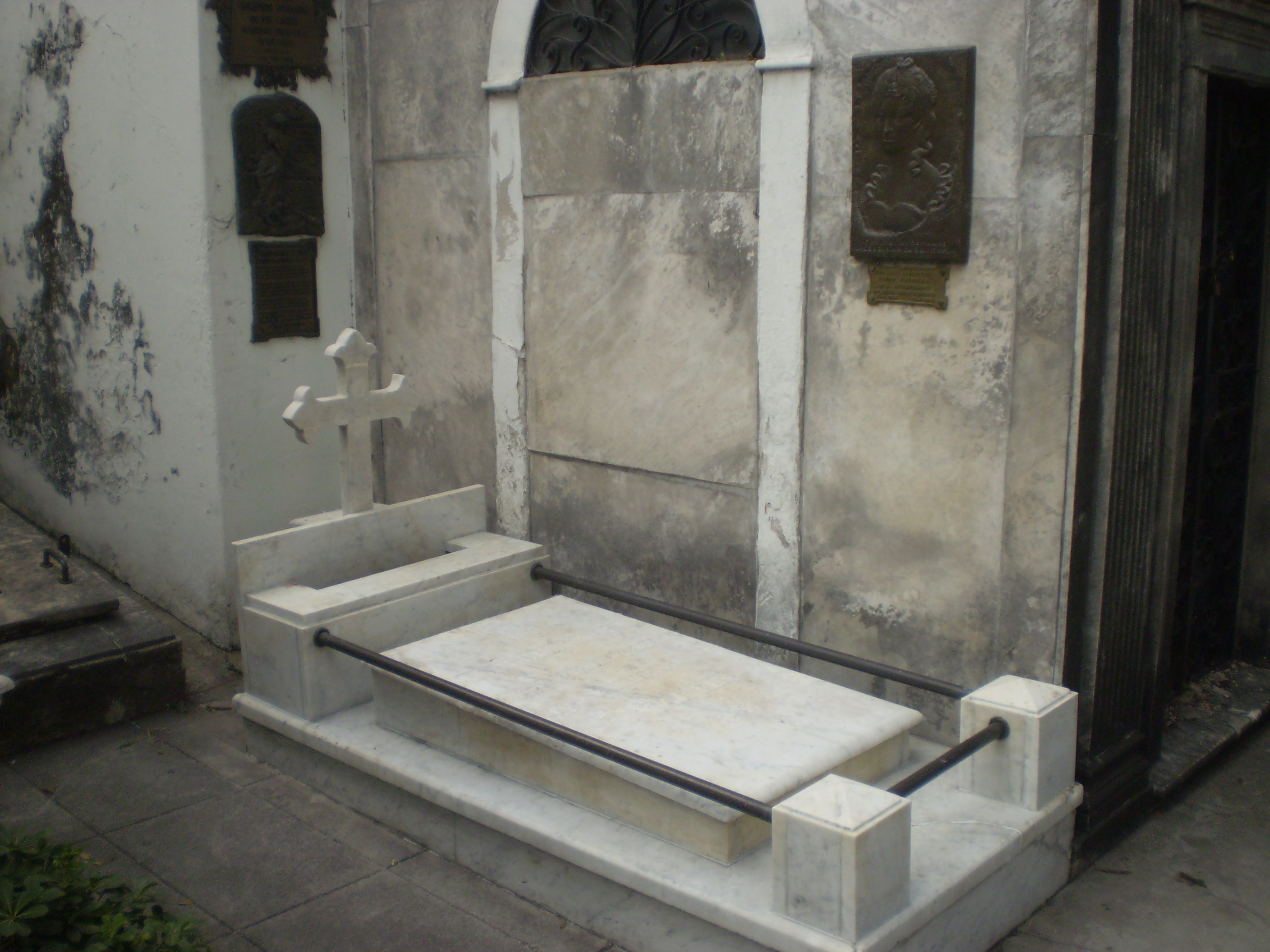
Recoleta tomb of Sñra. San Martín

María Remedios de Escalada was buried at the La Recoleta Cemetery, and San Martín departed for Le Havre, France, the following February; he died in exile in 1850.

== Bibliography ==
- Galasso, Norberto (2009). Seamos Libres y lo demás no importa nada. Buenos Aires: Colihue. ISBN 978-950-581-779-5.
- Sosa de Newton, Lily. Diccionario Biográfico de Mujeres Argentinas. Buenos Aires: Editorial Plus Ultra, 1972.
- Historical Dictionary of Argentina. London: Scarecrow Press, 1978.
