= José de San Martín =

Argentine general and leader (1778–1850)

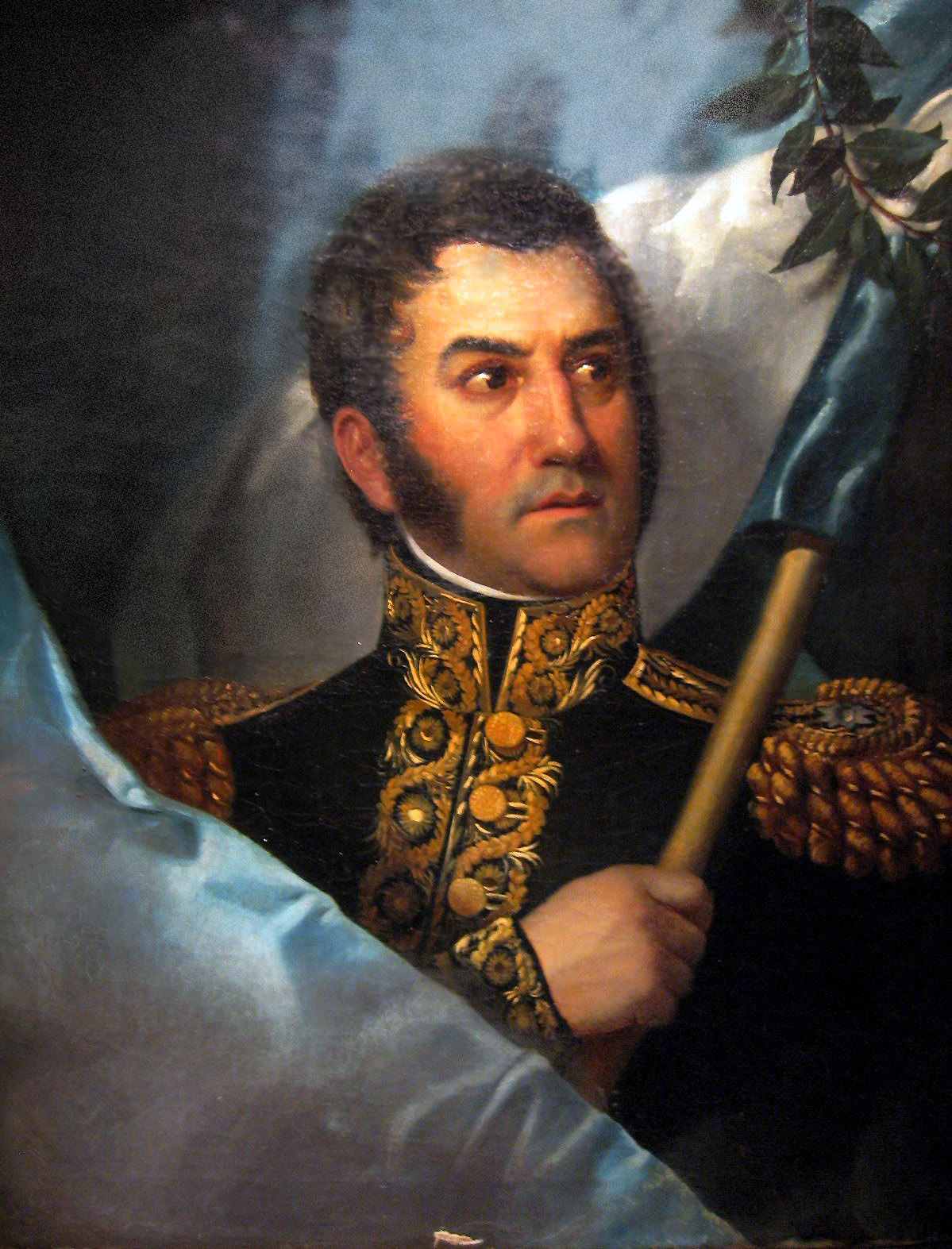
- Late 1820s painting

Protector of Peru
- In office 3 August 1821 – 20 September 1822
- Preceded by: Office created
- Succeeded by: José de la Mar

Commander-in-chief of the Liberating Army of Peru
- In office 19 May 1820 – 20 September 1822
- Preceded by: Office created
- Succeeded by: Office suppressed

General-in-chief of the Army of Chile
- In office 14 February 1817 – 20 July 1820
- Preceded by: José Miguel Carrera
- Succeeded by: Bernardo O'Higgins

General-in-chief of the Army of the Andes
- In office 1 August 1816 – 20 September 1821
- Preceded by: Office suppressed
- Succeeded by: Enrique Martínez

Governor of Cuyo
- In office 10 August 1814 – 24 September 1816
- Preceded by: Marcos Balcarce
- Succeeded by: Toribio de Luzuriaga

General-in-chief of the Army of the North
- In office 30 January – 20 April 1814
- Preceded by: Manuel Belgrano
- Succeeded by: José Rondeau

Commander of the Regiment of Mounted Grenadiers
- In office 7 December 1812 – April 1816
- Preceded by: Office created
- Succeeded by: José Matías Zapiola

Personal details
- Born: 25 February 1778 Yapeyú, Viceroyalty of the Río de la Plata
- Died: 17 August 1850 (aged 72) Boulogne-sur-Mer, France
- Party: Patriot
- Spouse: María de los Remedios de Escalada y la Quintana (m. 1812; died 1823)
- Children: Mercedes Tomasa San Martín y Escalada
- Profession: Military

Military service
- Allegiance: Spain (1786–1812); United Provinces (1812–1821); Chile (1818-1821); Peru (1821–1823)
- Years of service: 1789–1822
- Rank: General (Argentina); Captain general (Chile); Generalissimo (Peru)
- Commands: Regiment of Mounted Grenadiers; Army of the North; Army of the Andes; Chilean Army
- Battles/wars: War of the Second Coalition; War of the Oranges; Peninsular War; Battle of Bailén; Battle of Albuera; Spanish American wars of independence; Battle of San Lorenzo; Battle of Chacabuco; Second Battle of Cancha Rayada; Battle of Maipú; First siege of Callao

José Francisco de San Martín y Matorras (Spanish pronunciation: [xoˈse ðe sam maɾˈtin]; 25 February 1778 – 17 August 1850), nicknamed "the Liberator of Argentina, Chile, and Peru", was an Argentine general and the primary leader of the southern and central parts of South America's successful struggle for independence from the Spanish Empire who served as the Protector of Peru. Born in Yapeyú, Corrientes, in modern-day Argentina, he left the Viceroyalty of the Río de la Plata at the early age of seven to study in Málaga, Spain.

In 1808, after taking part in the Peninsular War against France, San Martín contacted South American supporters of independence from Spain in London. In 1812, he set sail for Buenos Aires and offered his services to the United Provinces of the Río de la Plata, present-day Argentina and other countries. After the Battle of San Lorenzo and time commanding the Army of the North during 1814, he organized a plan to defeat the Spanish forces that menaced the United Provinces from the north, using an alternative path to the Viceroyalty of Peru. This objective first involved the establishment of a new army, the Army of the Andes, in Cuyo Province, Argentina. From there, he led the Crossing of the Andes to Chile, and triumphed at the Battle of Chacabuco and the Battle of Maipú (1818), thus liberating Chile from royalist rule. Then he sailed to attack the Spanish stronghold of Lima, Peru.

On 12 July 1821, after seizing partial control of Lima, San Martín was appointed Protector of Peru, and Peruvian independence was officially declared on 28 July. On 26 July 1822, after a closed-door meeting with fellow libertador Simón Bolívar at Guayaquil, Ecuador, Bolívar took over the task of fully liberating Peru. San Martín unexpectedly left the country and resigned the command of his army, excluding himself from politics and the military, and moved to France in 1824. The details of that meeting would be a subject of debate by later historians.

San Martín is regarded as a national hero of Argentina, Chile, and Peru, a great military commander, and one of the Liberators of Spanish South America. The Order of the Liberator General San Martín (Orden del Libertador General San Martín), created in his honor, is the highest decoration conferred by the Argentine government.

== Early life ==
José de San Martín's father, Juan de San Martín, son of Andrés de San Martín and Isidora Gómez, was born in the town of Cervatos de la Cueza, in the current Province of Palencia (former Kingdom of León, in Spain) and was lieutenant governor of the department. He served as a military man to the Spanish Crown and in 1774 he was appointed Governor of the Yapeyú Department, part of the Government of the Guaraní Missions, created to administer the thirty Guaraní Jesuit missions. After the order he was expelled from Hispanic America by Carlos III in 1767 based in Yapeyú reduction. His mother Gregoria Matorras del Ser was Spanish born 1738 in Paredes de Nava, Palencia, a few kilometres from where Juan de San Martin was born and the daughter of Domingo Matorras and María del Ser. In 1806 she eventually settled after the death of her daughter Elena and died in Orense, Galicia in 1813. He was born in Yapeyú, Corrientes, an Indian reduction of Guaraní people. The exact year of his birth is disputed, as there are no records of his baptism. Later documents formulated during his life, such as passports, military career records and wedding documentation, gave him varying ages. Most of these documents point to his year of birth as either 1777 or 1778. The family moved to Buenos Aires in 1781, when San Martín was three or four years old.

Juan requested to be transferred to Spain, leaving the Americas in 1783. The family settled in Madrid, but as Juan was unable to earn a promotion, they moved to Málaga. Once in the city, San Martín enrolled in Málaga's school of temporalities, beginning his studies in 1785. It is unlikely that he finished the six-year-long elementary education, before he enrolled in the Regiment of Murcia in 1789, when he reached the required age of 11. He began his military career as a cadet in the Murcian Infantry Unit.

=== Military career in Europe ===
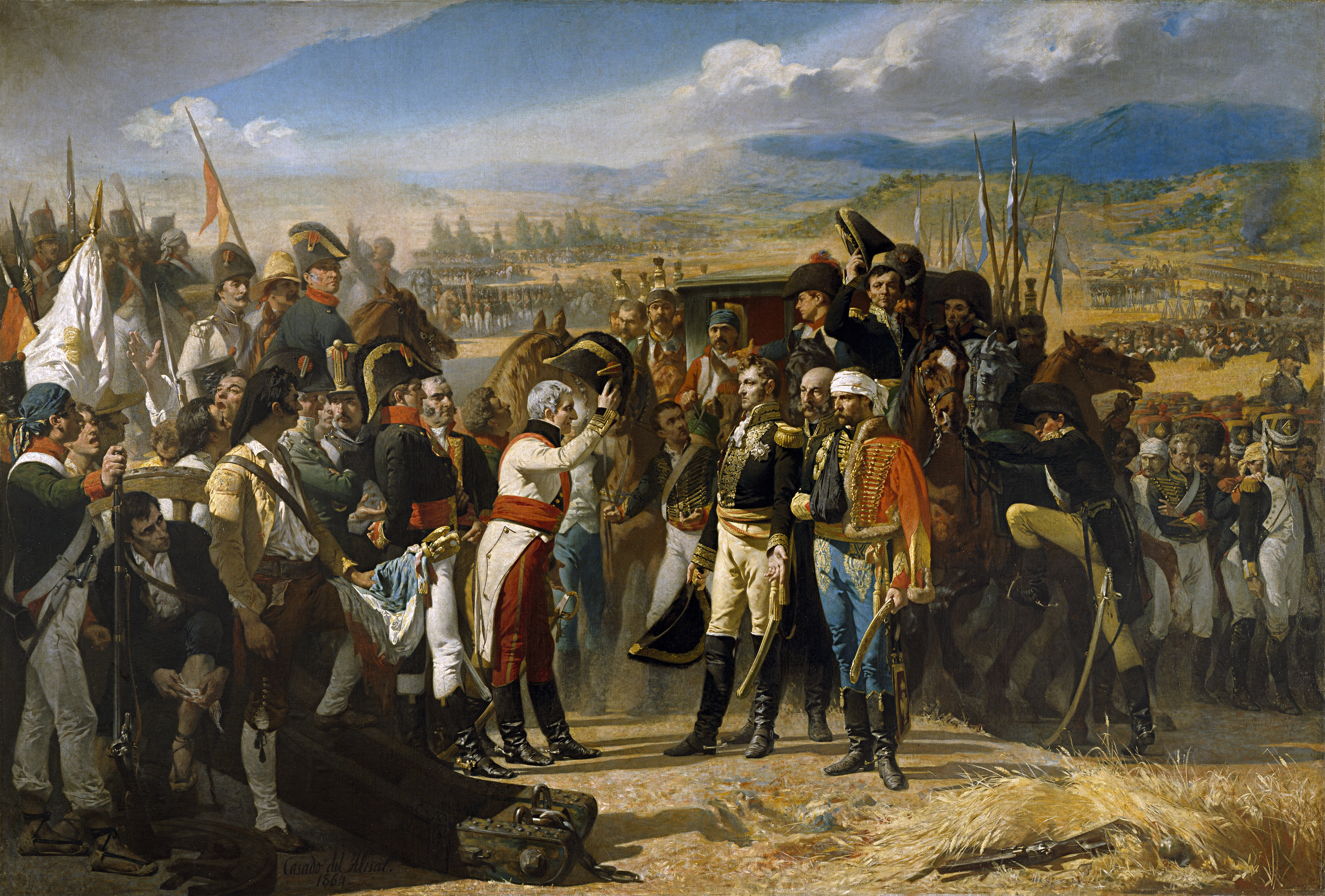
The Surrender of Bailén by José Casado del Alisal. The Battle of Bailén in 1808 was one of the most important battles fought by José de San Martín in the Peninsular War.

San Martín took part in several Spanish campaigns in North Africa, fighting in Melilla and in Oran against the Moors in 1791, among others. His rank was raised to Sub-Lieutenant in 1793, at the age of 15. He began a naval career during the War of the Second Coalition, when Spain was allied with France against Great Britain, during the French Revolution. His ship Santa Dorotea was captured by the Royal Navy, who kept him as a prisoner of war for some time. Soon afterward, he continued to fight in southern Spain, mainly in Cádiz and Gibraltar with the rank of Second Captain of light infantry. He continued to fight Portugal on the side of Spain in the War of the Oranges in 1801. He was promoted to captain in 1804. During his stay in Cádiz he was influenced by the ideas of the Spanish Enlightenment.

At the outbreak of the Peninsular War in 1808, San Martín was named adjutant of Francisco Solano, 2nd Marquis de Socorro. Rosas, suspected of being an afrancesado, was killed by a popular uprising which overran the barracks and dragged his corpse in the streets. San Martín was appointed to the armies of Andalusia, and led a battalion of volunteers. In June 1808 his unit became incorporated into a guerrilla force led by Juan de la Cruz Mourgeón. He was nearly killed during the battle of Arjonilla, but was saved by Sergeant Juan de Dios. On 19 July 1808, Spanish and French forces engaged in the battle of Bailén, a Spanish victory that allowed the Army of Andalusia to attack and seize Madrid. For his actions during this battle, San Martín was awarded a gold medal, and his rank raised to lieutenant colonel. On 16 May 1811, he fought in the battle of Albuera under the command of general William Carr Beresford. By this time, the French armies held most of the Iberian Peninsula under their control, except for Cádiz.

Arrival of San Martín and Carlos María de Alvear to Buenos Aires, aboard the frigate George Canning.

San Martín resigned from the Spanish army, for controversial reasons, and moved to South America, where he joined the Spanish American wars of independence. Historians propose several explanations for this action: the common ones are that he missed his native land, that he was in the employ of the British and the congruence of the goals of both wars. The first explanation suggests that when the wars of independence began San Martín thought that his duty was to return to his country and serve in the military conflict. The second explanation suggests that Britain, which would benefit from the independence of the South American countries, sent San Martín to achieve it. The third suggests that both wars were caused by the conflicts between Enlightenment ideas and absolutism, so San Martín still waged the same war; the wars in the Americas only developed separatist goals after the Spanish Absolutist Restoration.

San Martín was initiated in the Lodge of Rational Knights in 1811. They met at the house of Carlos María de Alvear, other members were José Miguel Carrera, Aldao, Blanco Encalada and other criollos, American-born Spaniards. They agreed to return to their home lands and join the local revolutionary movements. San Martín asked for his retirement from the military, and moved to Britain. He stayed in the country for a short time, and met many other South Americans at a lodge held at the house of Venezuelan general Francisco de Miranda at 27 Grafton Street (now 58 Grafton Way), Bloomsbury, London (the house now has a blue plaque with Miranda's name). Then he sailed to Buenos Aires aboard the British ship George Canning, along with the South Americans Alvear, Francisco José de Vera and Matías Zapiola, and the Spaniards Francisco Chilavert and Eduardo Kailitz. They arrived on 9 March 1812, to serve under the First Triumvirate.

== South America ==
=== Argentina ===
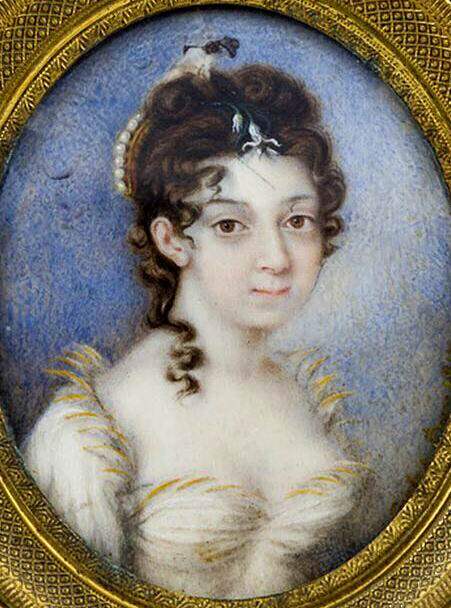
María de los Remedios de Escalada, San Martín's wife

A few days after his arrival in Buenos Aires in the United Provinces (formally named the Argentine Republic in 1826), San Martín was interviewed by the First Triumvirate. They appointed him a lieutenant colonel of cavalry, and asked him to create a cavalry unit, as Buenos Aires did not have good cavalry. He began to organize the Regiment of Mounted Grenadiers with Alvear and Zapiola. As Buenos Aires lacked professional military leaders, San Martín was entrusted with the protection of the whole city, but kept focused in the task of building the military unit.

San Martín, Alvear and Zapiola established a local branch of the Lodge of Rational Knights, along with morenists, the former supporters of the late Mariano Moreno. This lodge sought to promote liberal ideas; its secrecy hides whether it was a real Masonic lodge, or a lodge with political goals. It had no ties to the Premier Grand Lodge of England. In September 1812, San Martín married María de los Remedios de Escalada, a 14-year-old girl from one of the local wealthy families.

The lodge organized the Revolution of 8 October 1812 when the terms of office of the triumvirs Manuel de Sarratea and Feliciano Chiclana ended. Juan Martín de Pueyrredón promoted antimorenist new members, Manuel Obligado and Pedro Medrano, by preventing the vote of three deputies and thus achieving a majority. As this caused a commotion, San Martín and Alvear intervened with their military force, and the Buenos Aires Cabildo disestablished the triumvirate. It was replaced by the Second Triumvirate of Juan José Paso, Nicolás Rodríguez Peña and Antonio Álvarez Jonte. The new triumvirate called the Assembly of the Year XIII and promoted San Martín to colonel.

==== San Lorenzo ====
José de San Martín, trapped under his dead horse during the battle of San Lorenzo, is saved by Juan Bautista Cabral.

Montevideo, on the other shore of the Río de la Plata, was still a royalist stronghold. Argentine general José Rondeau laid siege to it, but the Montevidean navy eluded it by pillaging nearby cities. San Martín was sent with the new Regiment to watch the activities in the Paraná River shore.

The Regiment followed the navy from a distance, avoiding detection. They hid in the San Carlos Convent, in San Lorenzo, Santa Fe. San Martín watched the enemy ships from the top of the convent during the night. The royalists disembarked at dawn, ready to pillage and the regiment charged into battle. San Martín employed a pincer movement to trap the royalists. He led one column and Justo Bermúdez the other.

San Martín's horse was killed during the battle, and his leg was trapped under the corpse of the animal after the fall. A royalist, probably Zabala himself, attempted to kill San Martín while he was trapped under his dead horse where he suffered a saber injury to his face, and a bullet wound to his arm. Juan Bautista Cabral and Juan Bautista Baigorria of San Martín's regiment intervened and saved his life; Cabral was mortally wounded, and died shortly afterwards.

The battle did not have a notable influence on the war and did not prevent further pillage. Montevideo was finally subdued by Admiral William Brown during the Second Banda Oriental campaign. Antonio Zabala, the leader of the Montevidean army, served under San Martín during the crossing of the Andes years later.

==== Army of the North ====
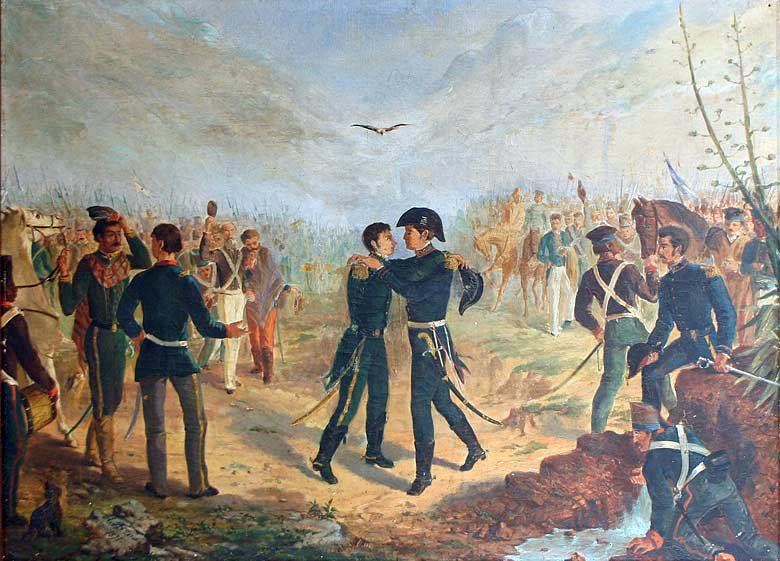
Meeting of Manuel Belgrano and José de San Martín at the Yatasto relay.

Once again in Buenos Aires, San Martín and his wife attended to the first official performance of the Argentine National Anthem, on 28 May 1813 at the Coliseo Theater. Oral tradition has it that the premiere took place on 14 May 1813 at the home of aristocrat Mariquita Sánchez de Thompson, with San Martín also attending, but there is no documentary evidence of that. The lyrics of the new anthem included several references to the secessionist will of the time.

Although they were still allies, San Martín began to distance himself from Alvear, who controlled the Assembly and the lodge. Alvear opposed the merchants and the Uruguayan caudillo José Gervasio Artigas, San Martín thought that it was risky to open such conflicts when the royalists were still a threat. The Army of the North, which was operating at the Upper Peru, was defeated at the battles of Vilcapugio and Ayohuma, so the triumvirate appointed San Martín to head it, replacing Manuel Belgrano.

San Martín and Belgrano met at the Yatasto relay. The army was in poor condition, and San Martín initially refused to remove Belgrano from the army, as it would hurt the soldiers' morale. However, the supreme director Gervasio Posadas (who replaced the triumvirate in government) insisted, and San Martín acted as instructed. San Martín stayed only a few weeks in Tucumán, reorganizing the army and studying the terrain. He also had a positive impression of the guerrilla war waged by Martín Miguel de Güemes against the royalists, similar to the Peninsular War. It was a defensive war, and San Martín trusted that they could prevent a royalist advance in Jujuy.

San Martín had health problems in April 1814, probably caused by hematemesis. He temporarily delegated the command of the Army to colonel Francisco Fernández de la Cruz and requested leave to recover. He moved to Santiago del Estero, and then to Córdoba where he slowly recovered. During this time King Ferdinand VII returned to the throne, began the absolutist restoration and began to organize an attack on the rogue colonies. After an interview with Tomás Guido, San Martín came up with a plan: organize an army in Mendoza, cross the Andes to Chile, and move to Peru by sea; all while Güemes defended the north frontier. This would place him in Peru without crossing the harsh terrain of Upper Peru, where two campaigns had already been defeated. To advance this plan, he requested the governorship of the Cuyo province, which was accepted. He took office on 6 September.

==== Governor of Cuyo ====
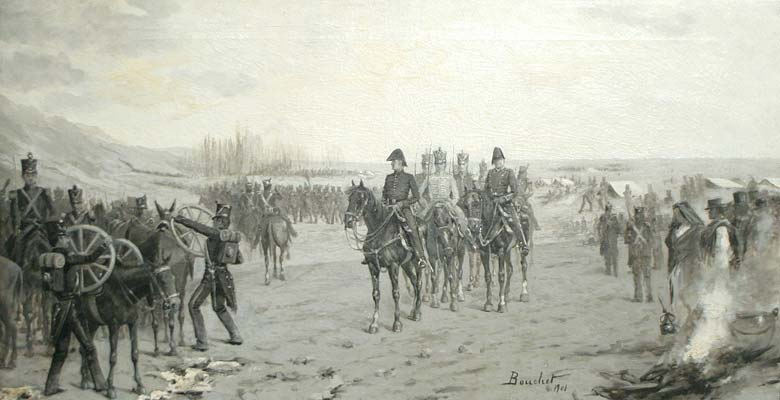
Training of the Army of the Andes at camp Plumerillo

The absolutist restoration in Spain and the growing influence of Artigas generated a political crisis in Buenos Aires, forcing Posadas to resign. Alvear became the new Supreme Director, but had to resign after three months. San Martín's plan was complicated as well by the Disaster of Rancagua, a royalist victory that restored absolutism in Chile, ending the Patria Vieja period. San Martín initially proposed a regular-sized army, simply to reinforce Chile, but changed to propose a larger one, to liberate the country from the occupation. Chileans Bernardo O'Higgins, José Miguel Carrera, Luis Carrera and Manuel Rodríguez, the leaders of the deposed Chilean rule, sought refugee in Cuyo, along with their armies. O'Higgins and Rodríguez were well received, but the Carrera brothers intended to act as a government in exile. They ignored the local laws of Cuyo, and their soldiers committed acts of vandalism. San Martín imprisoned them and sent them to Buenos Aires. They proposed a plan to liberate Chile, different to the one outlined by San Martín, who rejected it as impractical. This initiated a rivalry between the Carreras and San Martín.

San Martín immediately began to organize the Army of the Andes. He drafted all the citizens who could bear arms and all the slaves from ages 16 to 30, requested reinforcements to Buenos Aires, and reorganized the economy for war production. He took another leave to restore his health four months after taking power, so Alvear appointed Gregorio Perdriel. This appointment was resisted by the Mendoza Cabildo, which ratified San Martín.

The government of San Martín repeated some of the ideas outlined in the Operations plan, drafted by Mariano Moreno at the beginning of the war. A combination of incentives, confiscations and planned economy allowed the country to provision the army: gunpowder, pieces of artillery, mules and horses, food, military clothing, etc. Mining increased, with increased extraction of lead, copper, saltpeter, sulfur and borax, which had several uses and improved local finances. Hundreds of women wove clothing used by the soldiers. Father José Luis Beltrán headed a military factory of 700 men, which produced rifles and horseshoes. San Martín stayed on good terms with both the government of Buenos Aires and the provincial caudillos, without fully allying with either one. He was able to receive provisions from both. He considered that the war of independence took priority over the civil wars.

The army was not ready as of the summer of 1815, delaying the crossing. Given the harsh conditions on the mountains, the crossing could only be done in the summer season, when there is less snow. Buenos Aires did not send more provisions after the ousting of Alvear. San Martín proposed to resign and serve under Balcarce, if they would support the campaign. San Martín and Guido wrote a report in the autumn of 1816, detailing to the Supreme Director Antonio González de Balcarce the full military plan of operations.

San Martín proposed that the country declare independence immediately, before the crossing. That way, they would be acting as a sovereign nation, and not as a mere rebellion. He had great influence over the Congress of Tucumán, a Congress with deputies from the provinces, which was established in March 1816. He opposed the appointment of José Moldes, a soldier from Salta who was against the policies of Buenos Aires, as he feared Moldes would break national unity. He rejected proposals to be appointed Supreme Director himself. He supported his friend and lodge member Juan Martín de Pueyrredón for the office. Pueyrredón resumed the military aid to Cuyo. The Congress of Tucumán declared independence on 9 July 1816. Congress discussed the type of government of the United Provinces of the Río de la Plata (modern Argentina). General Manuel Belgrano, who had made a diplomatic mission to Europe, informed them that independence would be more easily acknowledged by the European powers if the country established a monarchy. For this purpose, Belgrano proposed a plan to crown a noble of the Inca Empire as king (the Sapa Inca dynasty had been dethroned in the 16th century). San Martín supported this proposal, as well as Güemes and most deputies, except for those from Buenos Aires, who undermined the project and prevented its approval.

Needing even more soldiers, San Martín extended the emancipation of slaves to the ages from 14 to 55, and even allowed them to be promoted to higher military ranks. He proposed a similar measure at the national level, but Pueyrredón encountered severe resistance. He included as well the Chileans who escaped Chile after the disaster of Rancagua, and organized them in four units, each one of infantry, cavalry, artillery and dragoons. At the end of 1816, the Army of the Andes had 5,000 men, 10,000 mules and 1,500 horses. San Martin organized military intelligence, propaganda and disinformation to confuse the royalist armies (such as the specific routes taken in the Andes), boost the national fervor of his army and promote desertion among the royalists.

==== Crossing of the Andes ====
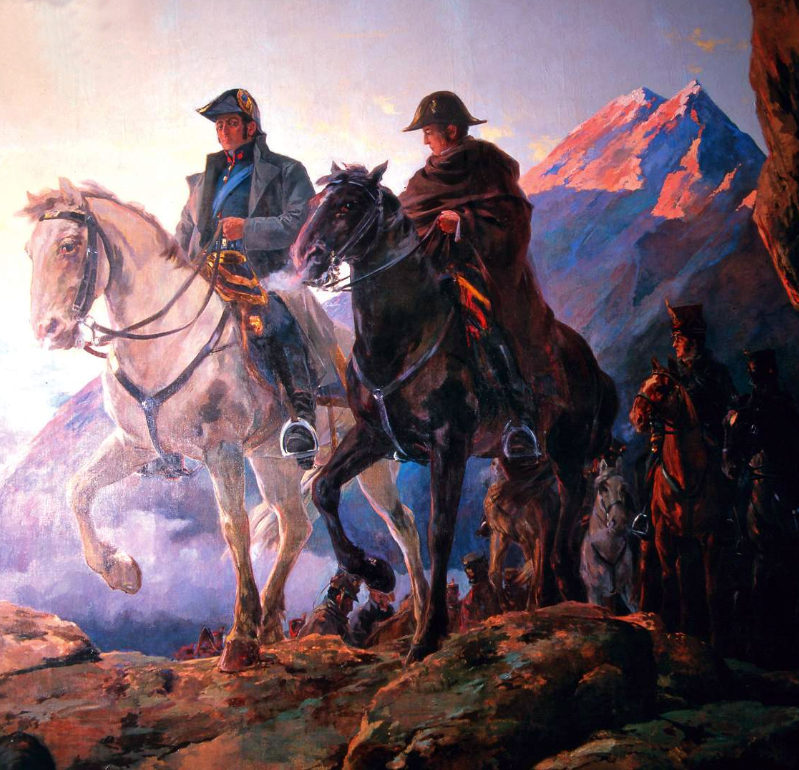
Generals José de San Martín (left) and Bernardo O'Higgins (right) during the crossing of the Andes.

Although the Congress of Tucumán had already formalized the flag of Argentina, the Army of the Andes did not use it, choosing a banner with two columns, light blue and white, and a coat of arms roughly similar to the Coat of arms of Argentina. The army did not use the flag of Argentina because it was not exclusively an Argentine army.

Contrary to the common understanding, the crossing of the Andes was not the first time that a military expedition crossed the mountain range. The difference from previous operations was the size of the army, and that it had to be ready for combat right after the crossing. The army was divided in six columns, each taking a different path. Colonel Francisco Zelada in La Rioja took the Come-Caballos pass towards Copiapó. Juan Manuel Cabot, in San Juan, moved to Coquimbo. Ramón Freire and José León Lemos led two columns in the south. The bulk of the armies left from Mendoza. San Martín, Soler and O'Higgins led a column across the Los Patos pass, and Juan Gregorio de Las Heras another one across the Uspallata Pass.

The whole operation took nearly a month. The armies took dried food for the soldiers and fodder for the horses, because of the inhospitable conditions. They also consumed garlics and onions, to prevent altitude sickness. Only 4,300 mules and 511 horses survived, less than half the original complement.

Manuel Rodríguez had returned to Chile before the crossing, and began a guerrilla war in Santiago de Chile against the royalists, in support of the upcoming army. He was supported in the south of the city and the countryside. The strategy was to occupy nearby villages, seize the royalists' weapons and flee. The attacks on Melipilla and San Fernando, and a failed one at Curicó, demoralized the royalists.

=== Chile ===
==== Battle of Chacabuco ====
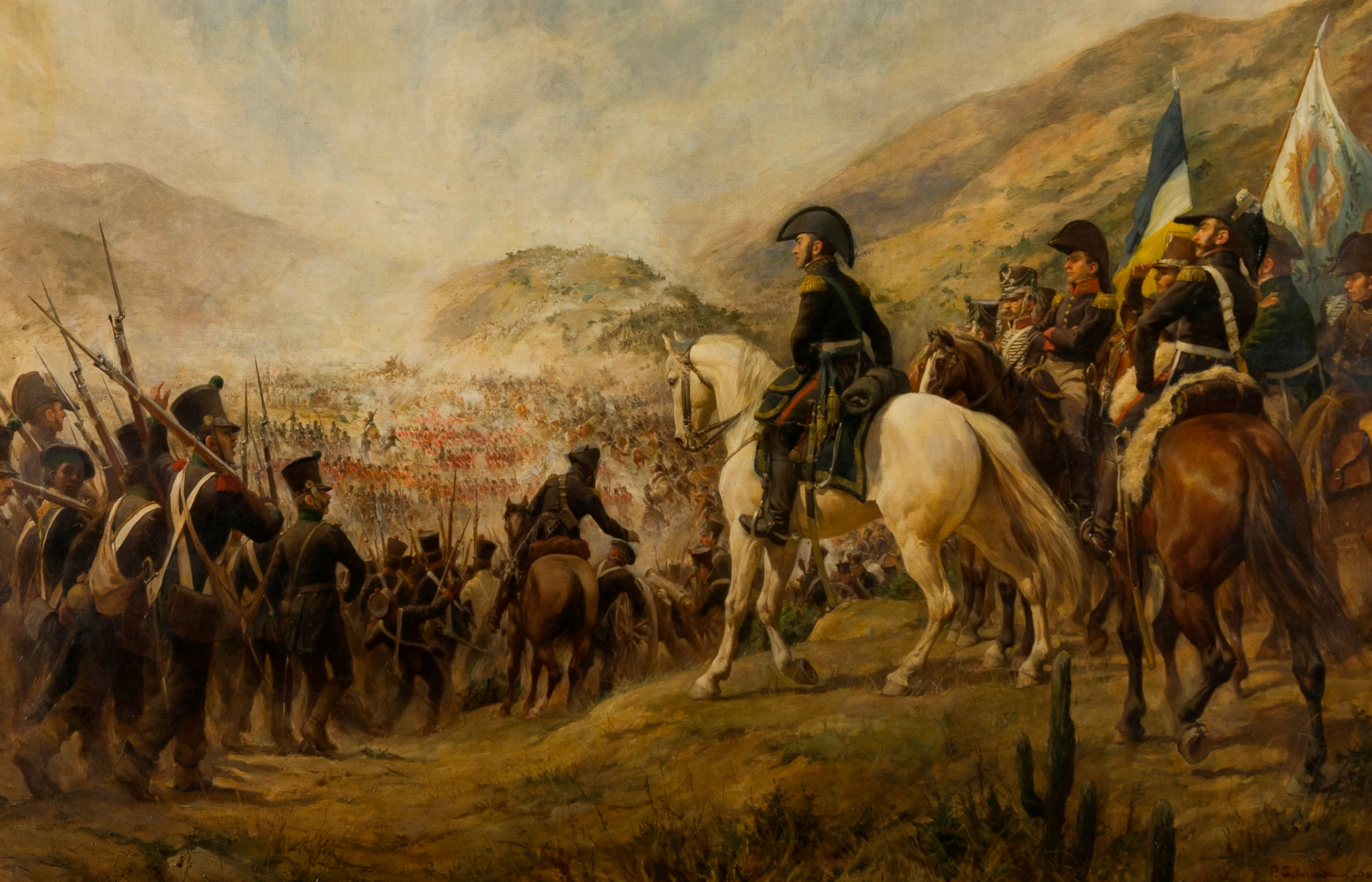
The Battle of Chacabuco between the Army of the Andes and Spanish forces in 1817.

The columns that crossed the Andes began to take military actions. The column in the north led by Cabot defeated the royalists in Salala, seized Coquimbo and then Copiapó. In the south, Ramón Freire captured Talca. Las Heras routed royalist outposts in Juncalito and Potrerillos. Bernardo O'Higgins, who came from Los Patos pass, defeated the royalists at Las Coimas. This allowed the main columns to gather at Aconcagua valley, meeting at the slopes of Chacabuco. Royalist commander Rafael Maroto converged his armies on that location as well. Maroto had 2,450 men and 5 pieces of artillery, San Martín had 3,600 men and 9 pieces of artillery. The misdirection that concealed the path of the bulk of the Army allowed San Martín this advantage, as other royalist forces were scattered in other regions of Chile.

The battle began on 12 February. San Martín organized a pincer movement, with Soler leading the west column and O'Higgins the east one. O'Higgins, eager to avenge the defeat at Rancagua, rushed to the attack, instead of coordinating with Soler. This gave the royalists a brief advantage. San Martín instructed Soler to rush the attack as well. The combined attack was successful and San Martín's column secured the final victory. The battle ended with 600 royalists dead and 500 prisoners, with only 12 deaths and 120 injuries in the Army of the Andes.

The army triumphantly entered Santiago de Chile the following day. Governor Francisco Marcó del Pont attempted to escape to Valparaíso and sail to Peru, but he was captured on 22 February and returned to Santiago. Several other officials were captured as well and sent as prisoners to San Luis, Argentina. San Martín sent Marcó del Pont prisoner to Mendoza.

==== Patria Nueva ====
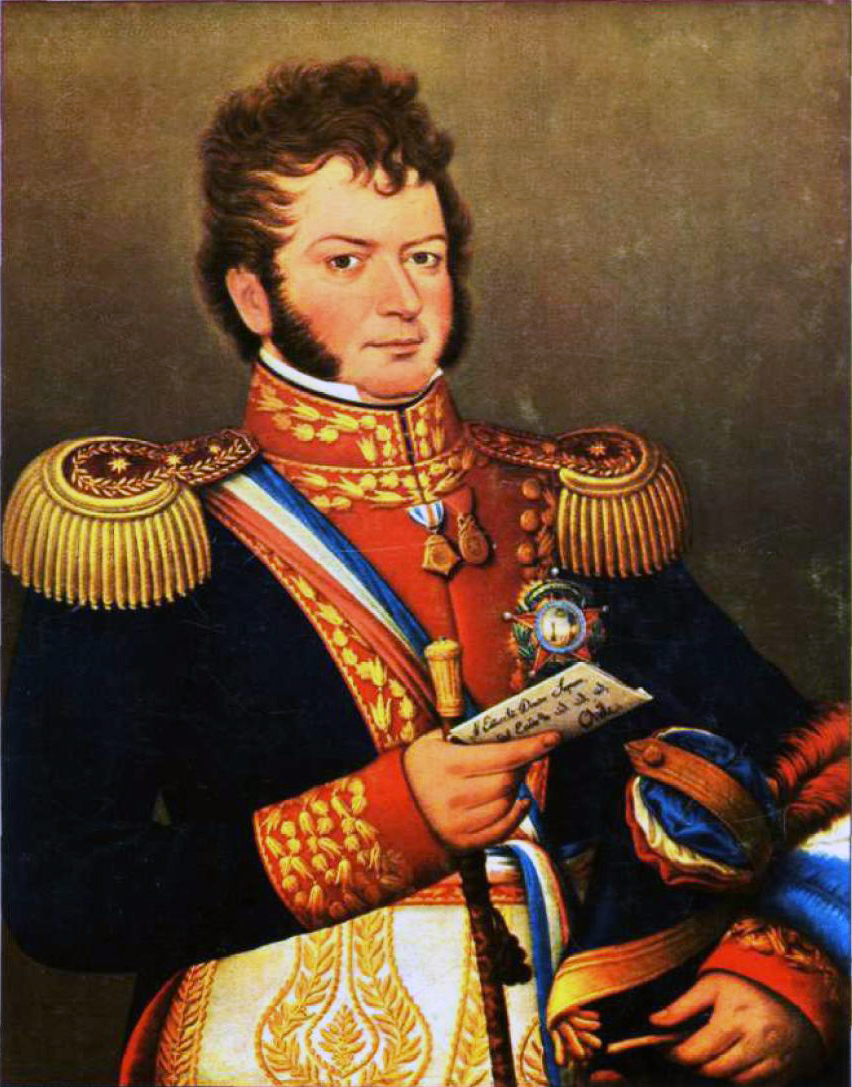
Bernardo O'Higgins, commander of the Army of the Andes along with San Martín, and Supreme Director of Chile after the victory at Chacabuco.

Three deputies from Coquimbo, Santiago and Concepción organized a new government, and proposed San Martín as Supreme Director of Chile. He declined the offer and proposed O'Higgins in his stead: he recommended that the Supreme Director should be someone from Chile. San Martín would instead organize the navy to take the fight to Peru. He established a local chapter of the Lodge of Rational Knights, named as Logia Lautaro, in reference to Mapuche leader Lautaro.

The victory in Chacabuco did not liberate the entirety of Chile. Royalist forces still resisted in southern Chile, allied with local Mapuche chiefs. Las Heras occupied Concepción, but failed to occupy Talcahuano. The royalist resistance lasted for several months, and Talcahuano was only captured when most of the continent was already free.

San Martín left O'Higgins in charge of the Army, and returned to Buenos Aires to request resources for the campaign to Peru. He did not receive a good reception, as Pueyrredón thought that Chile should compensate Buenos Aires for the money invested in their liberation, as the support to San Martín reduced the support to Belgrano, and the Portuguese-Brazilian invasion of the Eastern Bank menaced Buenos Aires. Incapable of financial support, Buenos Aires sent lawyer Manuel Aguirre to the United States, to request aid and acknowledge the declaration of independence. However, the envoy failed, as the United States stayed neutral in the conflict as they were in the process of negotiating the Adams–Onís Treaty for the purchase of Florida from Spain. The Chilean José Miguel Carrera had obtained his own ships after the disaster of Rancagua which he intended to use to liberate Chile, however, as this had already been achieved by San Martín, he subsequently refused to place his fleet under the Army of the Andes. Carrera was an enemy of O'Higgins and sought to navigate to Chile and depose him, which led to his imprisonment by Pueyrredón and the confiscation of his ships.

San Martín requested help from British Admiral William Bowles. He wrote from Chile and expected to find him in Buenos Aires, but Bowles had embarked for Rio de Janeiro. Bowles considered that San Martín was more trustworthy than Alvear, and praised his support for monarchism. San Martín did not obtain the ships and interrupted the correspondence with Bowles for some months. He returned to Chile; his wife Remedios stayed in Buenos Aires with her daughter Mercedes because of her health problems. Unable to get help from either Buenos Aires or foreign powers, San Martín promoted a more decisive commitment from Chile to finance the navy.

==== Battle of Cancha Rayada ====
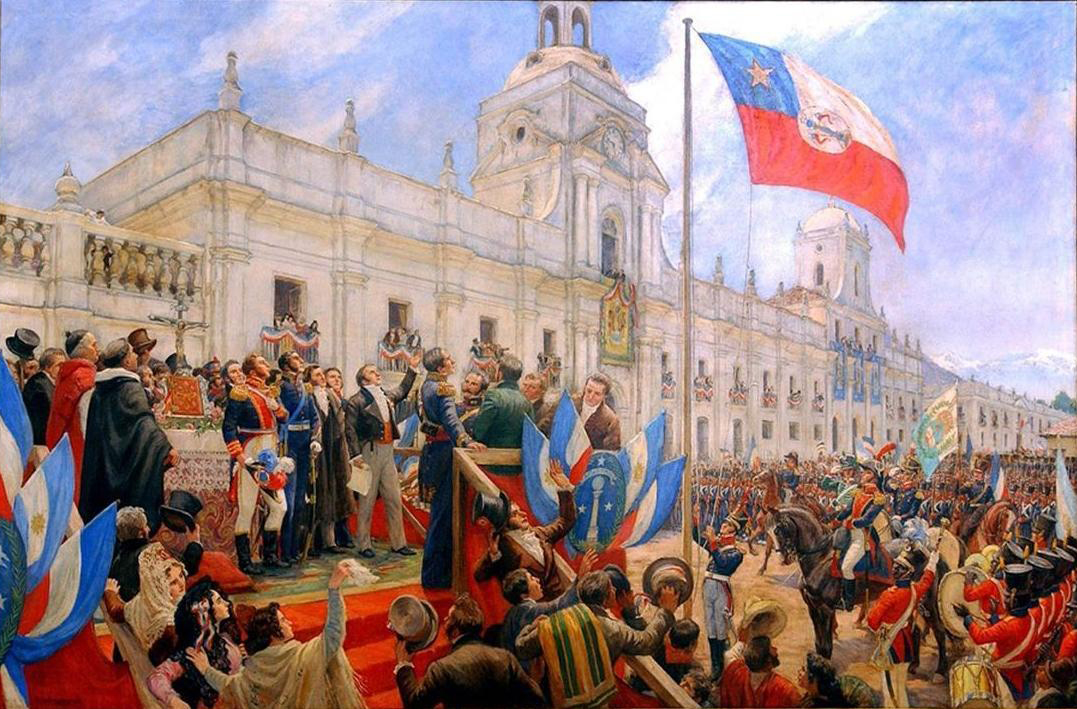
The Chilean Declaration of Independence took place on 18 February 1818, shortly before the battles of Cancha Rayada and Maipú.

The failure to liberate Talcahuano was followed by naval reinforcements from the North. The viceroy of Peru sent Mariano Osorio in an attempt to reconquer Chile. The royalists would then advance by land from south to north towards Santiago. San Martín thought that it was not possible to defend Concepción, so he ordered O'Higgins to leave the city. 50,000 Chileans took cattle and grain and moved north, burning everything else, so that they did not leave supplies for the royalists. As he had done with the Tucumán Congress, San Martín urged a declaration of independence, to legitimize the government and the military actions. The Chilean Declaration of Independence was issued on 18 February 1818, one year after the battle of Chacabuco.

San Martín, Las Heras and Balcarce met in Curicó, and the royalists in Talca, in a plain known as "Cancha rayada". As the patriots had a numeric advantage, 7,000 against 4,600, Osorio tried to avoid open battle, and tried instead a stealth operation. A spy informed San Martín that Osorio would make a surprise attack in the night, but the army could not be prepared in time. 1,000 soldiers fled, 120 died, and San Martín's assistant was killed. O'Higgins tried to resist with his unit, but retired when he was shot in the arm. Las Heras managed to retire his army in order, saving his 3,500 men. The patriots escaped to Santiago.

Despite the defeat, the soldiers were received as heroes in Santiago. Thanks to Las Heras, a potential disaster for the patriot armies turned into a minor setback. The army was reorganized again, but the deaths, injuries and desertions caused by the defeat at Cancha Rayada reduced its size to 5,000 soldiers, which was closer to the royalist forces. They took position next to the Maipo River, near Santiago.

==== Battle of Maipú ====
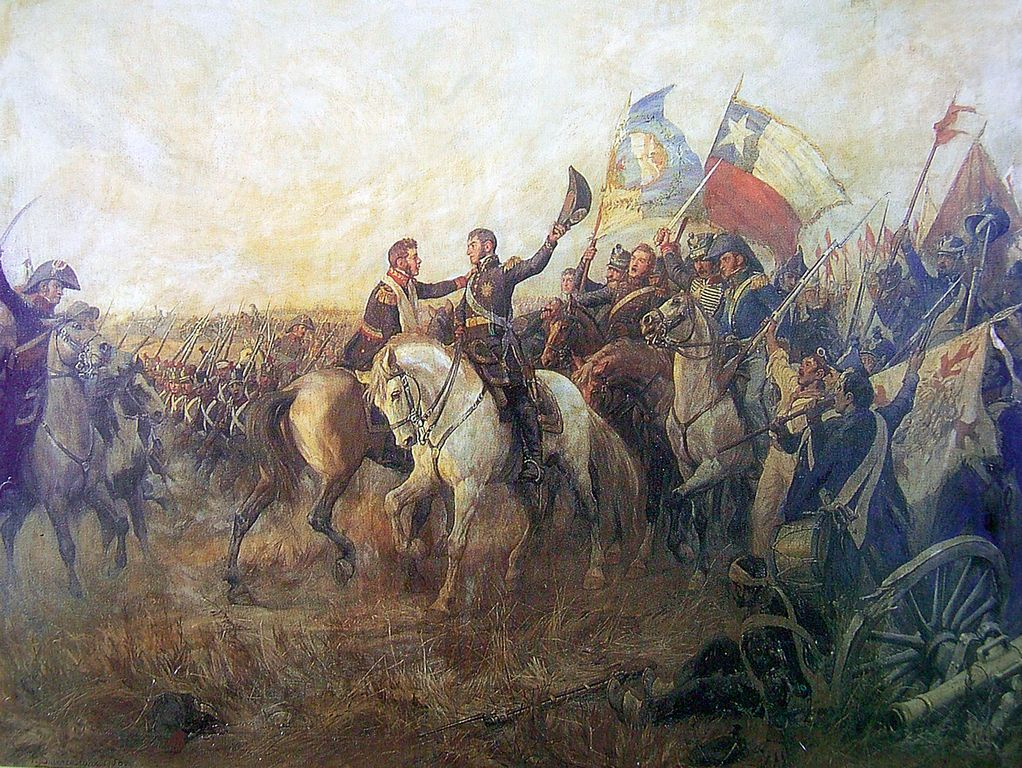
The "Embrace of Maipú" between José de San Martín and Bernardo O'Higgins, after the victory in the Battle of Maipú.

San Martín made a brief reconnaissance of the royalist army, and noticed several flaws in their organization. Feeling secure of victory, he claimed that "Osorio is clumsier than I thought. Today's triumph is ours. The sun as witness!". The battle began at 11:00 am. The patriot artillery on the right fired on the royalist infantry on the left. Manuel Escalada led mounted grenadiers to capture the royalist artillery, turning them against their owners. Burgos' regiment severely punished the patriot left wing, mainly composed of emancipated slaves, and took 400 lives. San Martín ordered the mounted grenadiers led by Hilarión de la Quintana to charge against the regiment. The firing suddenly ended and royalists began to fight with sword bayonets, under the cries "Long live the king!" and "Long live the homeland!" respectively. Finally, the royalists ended their cries and began to disperse.

When the regiment of Burgos realized that their line was broken, they stopped resisting, and the soldiers began to disperse. The cavalry pursued and killed most of them. At the end of the battle, the royalists had been trapped among the units of Las Heras in the west, Alvarado in the middle, Quintana in the east and the cavalries of Zapiola and Freire. Osorio tried to fall back to the hacienda "Lo Espejo" but could not reach it, so he tried to escape to Talcahuano. Ordóñez made his last stand at that hacienda, where 500 royalists died.

The battle ended in the afternoon. O'Higgins, still injured by the wound received in Cancha Rayada, arrived during the final action at the hacienda. He claimed "Glory to the savior of Chile!", in reference to San Martín, who praised him for going to the battlefield with his unhealed wound. They made an embrace on their horses, now known as the "Embrace of Maipú".

The battle of Maipú secured Chilean independence. Except for Osorio, who escaped with 200 cavalry, all top royalist military leaders were captured. All their armed forces were either killed or captured, and all their artillery, weapons, military hospitals, money and resources were lost. The victory was praised by Güemes, Bolívar and the international press.

==== Fleet of the Pacific ====
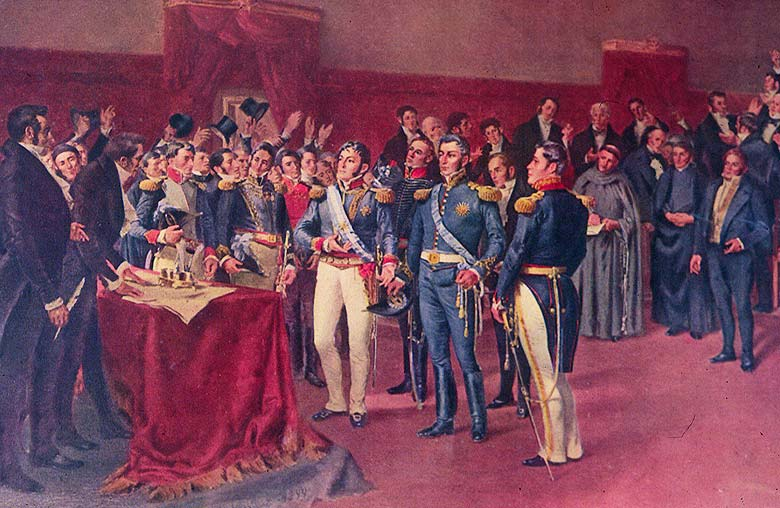
San Martín before the Congress of Buenos Aires

San Martín made a new request for ships to Bowles, but received no answer. He moved again to Buenos Aires, to make a similar request. He arrived to Mendoza a few days after the execution of the Chileans Luis and Juan José Carrera, brothers of José Miguel Carrera. The specific initiative of those executions is controversial. Chilean historian Benjamín Vicuña Mackenna indicts San Martín, while J. C. Raffo de la Reta blames O'Higgins instead. Manuel Rodríguez was also imprisoned and then killed in prison; this death may have been decided by the Lautaro lodge. San Martín could not have taken part in it, as he was already on the way to Buenos Aires.

San Martín was not well received in Buenos Aires. Pueyrredón initially declined to give further help, citing the conflicts with the federal caudillos and the organization of a huge royalist army in Cádiz that would try to reconquer the La Plata basin. He thought that Chile should organize the navy against Peru, not Buenos Aires. San Martín discussed with him and finally got financing of 500,000 pesos. He returned to Mendoza with his wife and daughter and received a letter from Pueyrredón, who said that Buenos Aires could only deliver one-third of the promised funds. This complicated the project, as neither Santiago de Chile nor Mendoza had the resources needed. San Martín resigned from the Army, but it is unclear whether his decision to resign was sincere or was to apply pressure to his backers. The government of Buenos Aires still considered San Martín vital to the national defense, so Pueyrredón agreed to pay the 500,000 pesos requested, and encouraged San Martín to withdraw his resignation.

San Martín proposed to mediate between Buenos Aires and the Liga Federal led by Artigas. He thought that the civil war was counter-productive to national unity, and that an end to hostilities would free resources needed for the navy. He calculated that Artigas might condition the peace on a joint declaration of war to colonial Brazil; so San Martín proposed to defeat the royalists first and then demand the return of the Eastern Bank to the United Provinces. O'Higgins recommended caution, fearing that San Martín might be captured. Pueyrredón rejected the mediation, as he did not recognize Artigas as an equal to negotiate with him.

==== Act of Rancagua ====
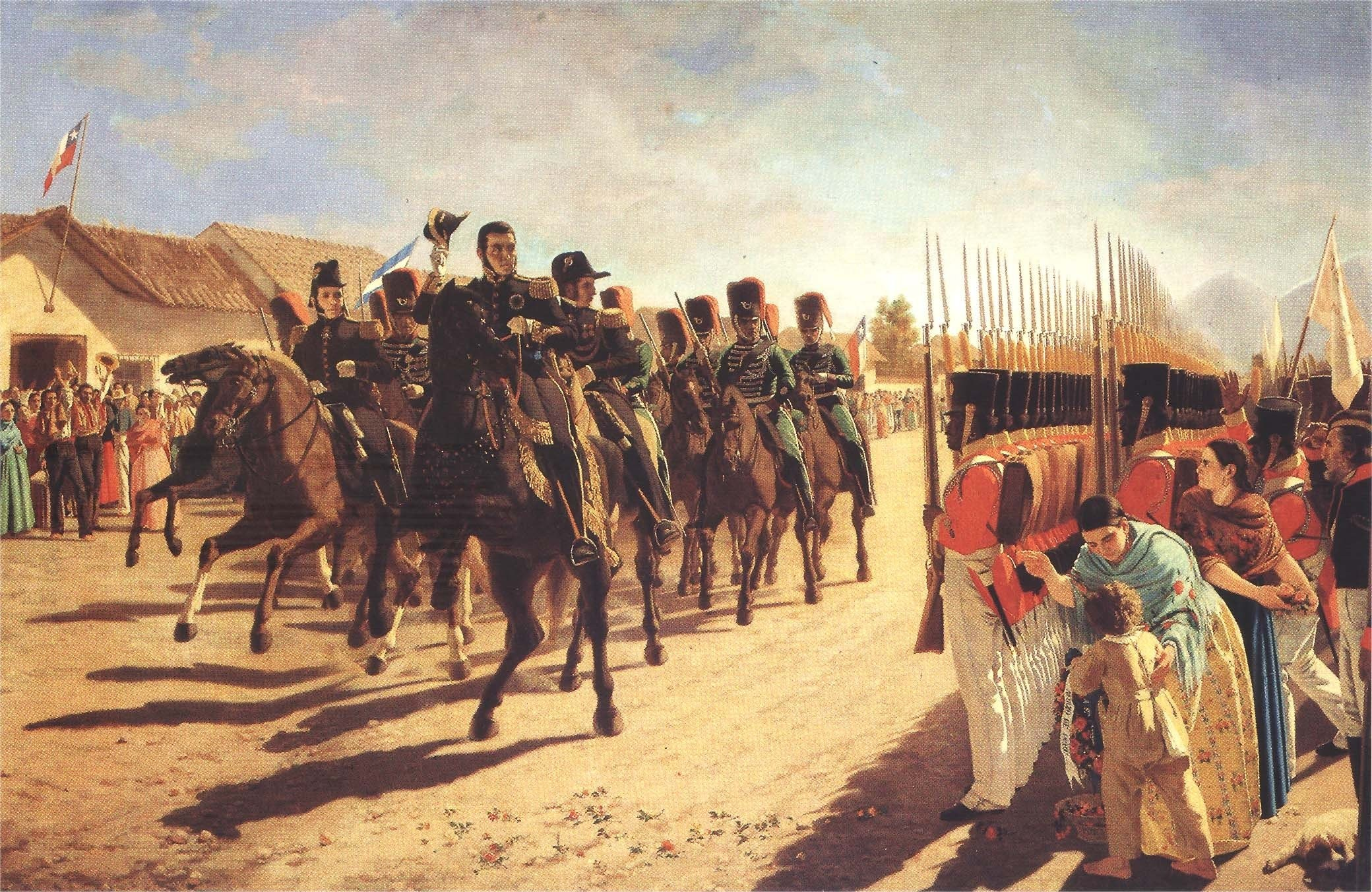
Parade of the Army of the Andes in Rancagua.

Although Artigas was defeated by the Luso-Brazilian armies, his allies Estanislao López and Francisco Ramírez continued hostilities against Buenos Aires for its inactivity against the invasion. Pueyrredón called the Army of the Andes and the Army of the North (led by Belgrano) to aid Buenos Aires in the conflict. Guido noted to San Martín that if both armies did that, the north of Argentina and Chile would be easily reconquered by the royalists. San Martín also knew that most of the soldiers of the Army of the Andes would not be willing to aid Buenos Aires in the civil war, as most were from other provinces or from Chile. San Martín had doubts as well about the projected arrival of a large military expedition from Spain, as the absolutist restoration of Ferdinand VII had met severe resistance in Spain. San Martín finally kept the Army in Chile when Belgrano's lieutenant Viamonte signed an armistice with López; he thought that the conflict had ended.

However, the minister of war Matías de Irigoyen ordered once more the return of the Army of the Andes, and appointed Francisco Fernández de la Cruz as its leader, displacing San Martín. San Martín resigned again, and observed that the Army would not be able to cross the Andes from Chile to Buenos Aires because the winter snow was blocking the trails. All the leaders of the military units of the Army of the Andes refused to go to Buenos Aires, as their soldiers would mutiny or desert. Facing both the resignation of San Martín and the refusals to obey the orders, the Supreme Director canceled the orders, and the Army of the Andes stayed in Chile. With the sanction of the Argentine Constitution of 1819, Pueyrredón ended his mandate as Supreme Director, replaced by José Rondeau.

The navy was finally completed in Chile, and the British captain Thomas Cochrane was appointed to lead it. But it was not sent to Peru immediately: there were still rumors of an attack from Spain, and if needed the navy would move to Buenos Aires and fight the Spanish ships. The civil war resumed and San Martín attempted once more to mediate, to no effect. Rondeau again requested the return of the Army of the Andes, without success. San Martín returned to Chile and prepared to take part in the naval actions against Peru, ignoring Buenos Aires. The Army of the North refused to join the conflict as well, revolting in Arequito and disbanding. Without either reinforcements, Rondeau was defeated by federal forces in the Battle of Cepeda. The Congress of Tucumán and the office of the Supreme Director of the United Provinces of the Río de la Plata were dissolved and the country turned into a confederation of 13 provinces, without a central state. This period is known as the Anarchy of the year XX. The rebellion of Spanish general Rafael del Riego and an outbreak of yellow fever in the punitive expedition organized in Cádiz ended the royalist threat to Buenos Aires. The Act of Rancagua invested San Martín with the full authority over the Army of the Andes, as it now lacked a national authority over it.

=== Peru ===
Peru had armed forces nearly four times the strength of those of San Martín: 6,244 soldiers in Lima, 8,000 at the northern provinces, 1,263 in the coast, 1,380 in Arequipa and 6,000 in the Upper Peru; nearly 23,000 soldiers in total. The Army of the Andes had 4,000 soldiers instead, and Cochrane's navy another 1,600. With this disparity of forces, San Martín tried to avoid battles. He tried instead to divide the enemy forces in several locations, as he did during the Crossing of the Andes, and trap the royalists with a pincer movement with either reinforcements of the Army of the North from the South or the army of Simón Bolívar from the North. He also tried to promote rebellions and insurrection within the royalist ranks, and promised the emancipation of any slaves that deserted their Peruvian masters and join the army of San Martín. The spreading of the news of the Liberal Triennium, a liberal rebellion in Spain that reinstated the Spanish Constitution of 1812, also sought to undermine royalist loyalty.

The navy sailed from Chile on 20 August 1820. It was composed of eight warships, eleven gunboats, 247 cannons and a crew of 1,600, most of them Chileans. There were 12 frigates, and a brig with the 4,000 soldiers of the Army of the Andes. San Martín was the leader of the military expedition. They landed in Paracas, 200 km to the south of Lima, on 7 September, and occupied the nearby city of Pisco, which was abandoned by the royalists.

==== Expedition of Peru ====
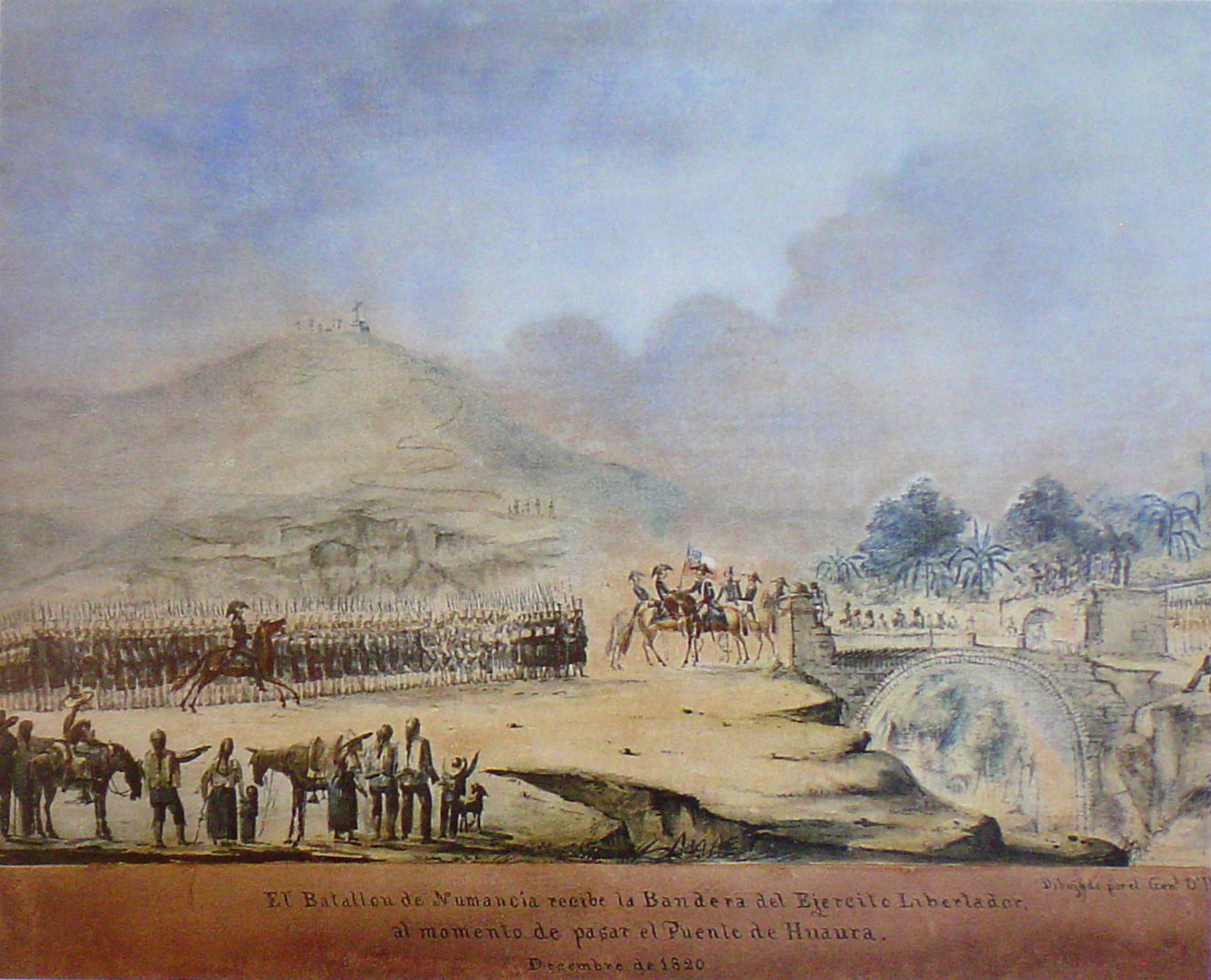
The Numancia battalion, formerly a royalist unit, joins the forces of San Martín.

Peruvian viceroy Joaquín de la Pezuela had instructions from Spain to negotiate with the patriots. Under an armistice the opponents celebrated a meeting in Miraflores. The viceroy's deputies proposed to adopt the liberal Spanish constitution if San Martín left the country, but the patriots requested instead that Spain grant the independence of Peru. The negotiations did not bear fruit.

San Martín isolated Lima from the surrounding countryside, and sent Juan Antonio Álvarez de Arenales to promote rebellions among the natives. The Army of the Andes moved north of Lima by sea. San Martín and Arenales besieged the city from two directions, and Cochrane attacked the port of El Callao. Cochrane captured the ship "Esmeralda", and the royalist regiment Numancia. Nearly 700 expeditionary soldiers of New Granada deserted and joined the patriots. Several populations in the north of Peru supported San Martín, and Arenales defeated the royalists at the Battle of Pasco. More than 300 royalists joined the patriots, including Andrés de Santa Cruz.

However, the plans did not fully work as intended. The native populations that joined Arenales could not resist the royalist counter-attacks, and the slaves did not join the army in the expected numbers. The Argentine provinces could not send the supporting army that San Martín had requested earlier, and the Army of the North no longer existed. As a result, he wrote to Simón Bolívar, trying to coordinate actions with him.

Pezuela was deposed by a military-liberal coup, and José de la Serna e Hinojosa became the new viceroy. De la Serna called San Martín to negotiate an end of hostilities. The result was the same than with Pezuela: De la Serna proposed to enact the 1812 Spanish constitution (Perú inside Spain), and San Martín demanded the independence of Peru (with an independent monarchy). The rejection of the Spanish constitution was motivated by the disproportional representation of the Americas in the Constituent Assembly that wrote it. Both armies agreed a temporary armistice. San Martín proposed to establish a constitutional monarchy with a European monarch, with a regency ruling in the interim. The proposal was rejected, on the grounds that they could not accept it without Ferdinand's approval.

==== Protector of Peru ====
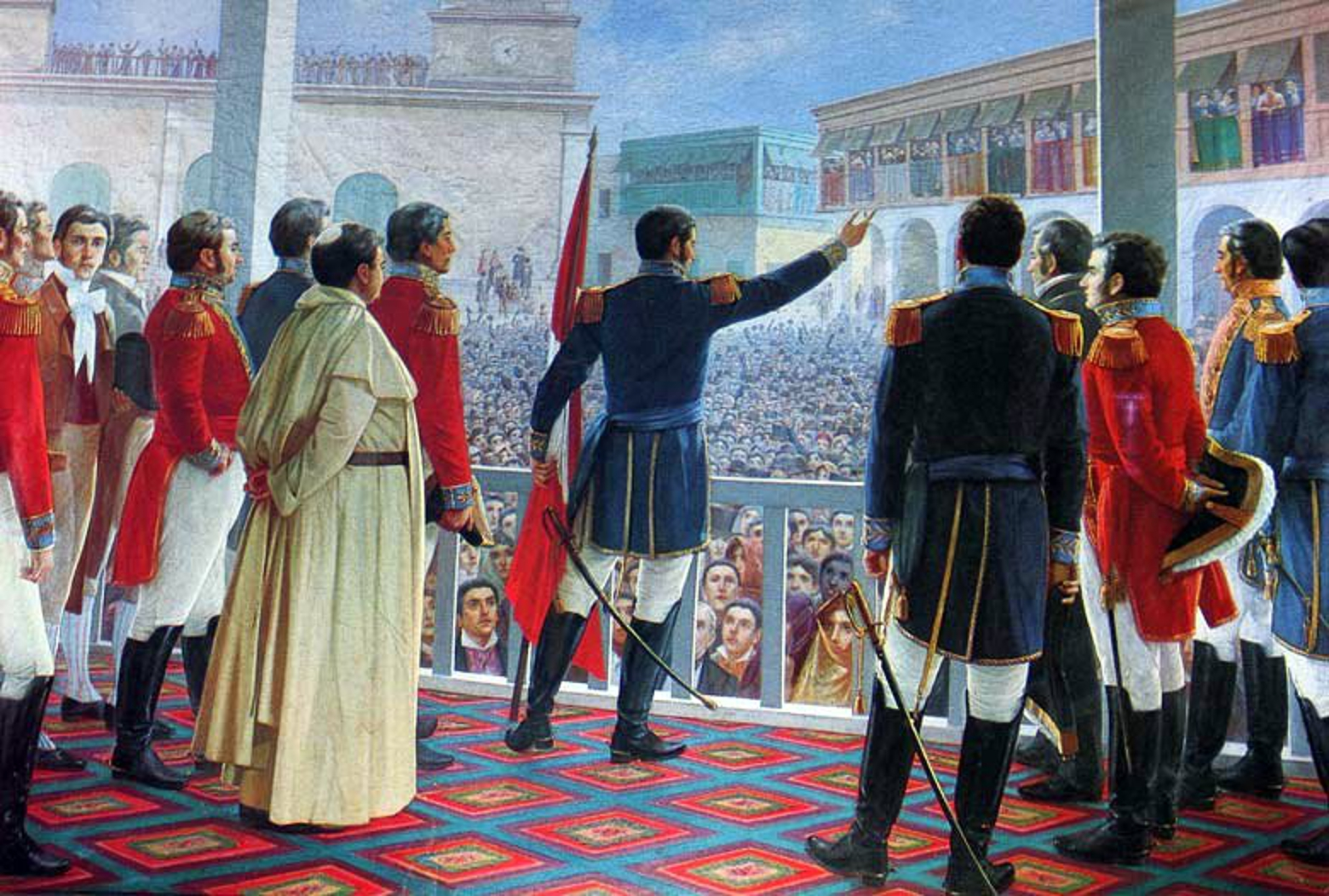
José de San Martín's proclamation of the independence of Peru on 28 July 1821 in Lima. Painting by Juan Lepiani

As hostilities renewed, San Martín organized several guerrilla groups in the countryside, and laid siege to Lima, but did not force his entry, as he did not want to appear as a conqueror to the local population. However, De la Serna suddenly left the city with his army, for unknown reasons. San Martín called for an open cabildo to discuss the independence of the country, which was agreed. With this approval, the authority in Lima, the support of the northern provinces and the port of El Callao under siege, San Martín declared the independence of Peru on 28 July 1821, creating the Protectorate of San Martín (first provisional government of Peru). The war, however, had not ended yet.

Unlike Chile, Peru had no local politicians of the stature of O'Higgins, so San Martín became the leader of the government, even though he did not want to. He was appointed Protector of Peru. As Peruvian society was highly conservative, San Martín did not take the liberal ideas too far immediately. The provisional statutes contained few changes and ratified several existing laws. All the types of servitude imposed on the natives, such as mita and yanaconazgo, were abolished, and the natives received citizenship. He did not abolish slavery completely, as Peru had 40,000 slaveowners, and declared "freedom of wombs" instead, which emancipated the sons of slaves; he emancipated as well the slaves of the royalists who left Lima. He also abolished the Inquisition and corporal punishment, and enacted freedom of speech. His appeal to subaltern groups extended towards women. San Martín promoted "female patriotism" as the Protector of Peru, as a means of recruiting a force to spread his independence ideals. During his stay in Peru, San Martín had a romance with Rosa Campuzano, a woman from Guayaquil.

The royalist armies that stayed in the Peruvian countryside headed to Lima, led by Canterac. In a confusing episode, there was no battle, as neither one attacked. Canterac changed his path to El Callao, took resources from it, and returned to his base. There was no battle during their return either. Without resources, El Callao surrendered in a few days. Both armies took inadvisable actions: San Martín allowed Canterac to receive reinforcements, and Canterac left a key military objective incapable to resist. There is no known documentation that provides a reasonable explanation of those events.

Cochrane had several disputes with San Martín. He discussed several of his actions and tried to bypass his authority. During the blockade of El Callao, he proposed that O'Higgins take control of the mission and send any spoils of battle to Chile. As San Martín was appointed Protector of Peru, Cochrane reasoned that San Martín was no longer under Chilean command, and took the navy away. In later years Cochrane made accusations against San Martín in Chile.

Bolívar took control of Caracas with his victory at the battle of Carabobo, and the Congress of Cúcuta issued laws similar to those in Perú. Guayaquil declared independence, and Bolívar sent Antonio José de Sucre to reinforce them. Sucre's forces were not enough, and requested help from San Martín. Peru sent a military force of 1,300 men. Bolívar entered the city a month later, and claimed that for historical reasons Quito should be part of Colombia. San Martín and Bolívar sought to generate Latin American integration, but disagreed on the type of government: Bolívar proposed a republic, and San Martín a constitutional monarchy, reasoning that it would be easier to receive international recognition for the now-independent South American nations. Peru and Colombia signed a treaty of integration, to be proposed to Chile, the United Provinces of the Río de la Plata and Paraguay, and at a later point to the United Provinces of Central America and the Empire of Brazil.

=== Guayaquil conference ===
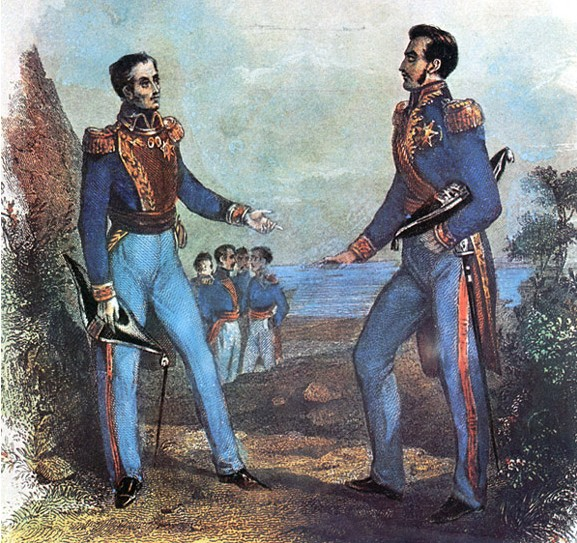
The Guayaquil conference between Simón Bolívar and José de San Martín. The real conference took place inside an office, and not in the countryside as the portrait suggests.

San Martín thought that if he joined forces with Bolívar he would be able to defeat the remnant royalist forces in Peru. Both liberators would meet in Quito, so San Martín appointed Torre Tagle to manage the government during his absence. Bolívar was unable to meet San Martín at the arranged date, so San Martín returned to Lima, but still left Tagle in government. Bolívar moved from Quito to Guayaquil, which secured its independence from Spain. There were discussions on the future of the region: some factions wanted to join Colombia, others to join Peru, and others to become a new nation. Bolívar ended the discussion by annexing Guayaquil into Colombia. There was Peruvian pressure on San Martín to do a similar thing, to annex Guayaquil to Peru.

The Guayaquil conference took place on 26 July 1822. They had two private meetings, on that day and the following one. As there were no witnesses or minutes, the content of their discussions can only be inferred from their later actions and their letters to other people. Some likely topics of discussion may have been a request of reinforcements, and an offer to combine the armies into a single one, with San Martín ranked second to Bolívar.

The minister Bernardo Monteagudo was removed from office by a Peruvian rebellion, during San Martín's absence. San Martín resigned as Protector of Peru a few days later and returned to Valparaíso, Chile. Several reasons influenced him to resign. The military discipline of the Army of the Andes was compromised, but San Martín was reluctant to take drastic action against his officers. The authority of San Martín and Bolívar, and the local rivalry of their respective countries Peru and Colombia, limited their options for joint work: Colombians would not have liked Bolívar to give many of his forces to San Martín, whilst Peruvians would not have liked their Protector to be second in command to Bolívar, and a joint command would complicate the maintenance of military discipline. Unlike Bolívar, backed up by the Colombian government, San Martín did not have more resources than those he already had: Buenos Aires denied him any support, the other Argentine governors (such as Juan Bautista Bustos) supported him but did not have resources to provide, O'Higgins was about to be deposed in Chile, and Cochrane took the navy and left him without naval power. Finally, he felt that only a very strong authority would be able to prevent balkanization, but refused to rule as a dictator himself.

== Later life ==
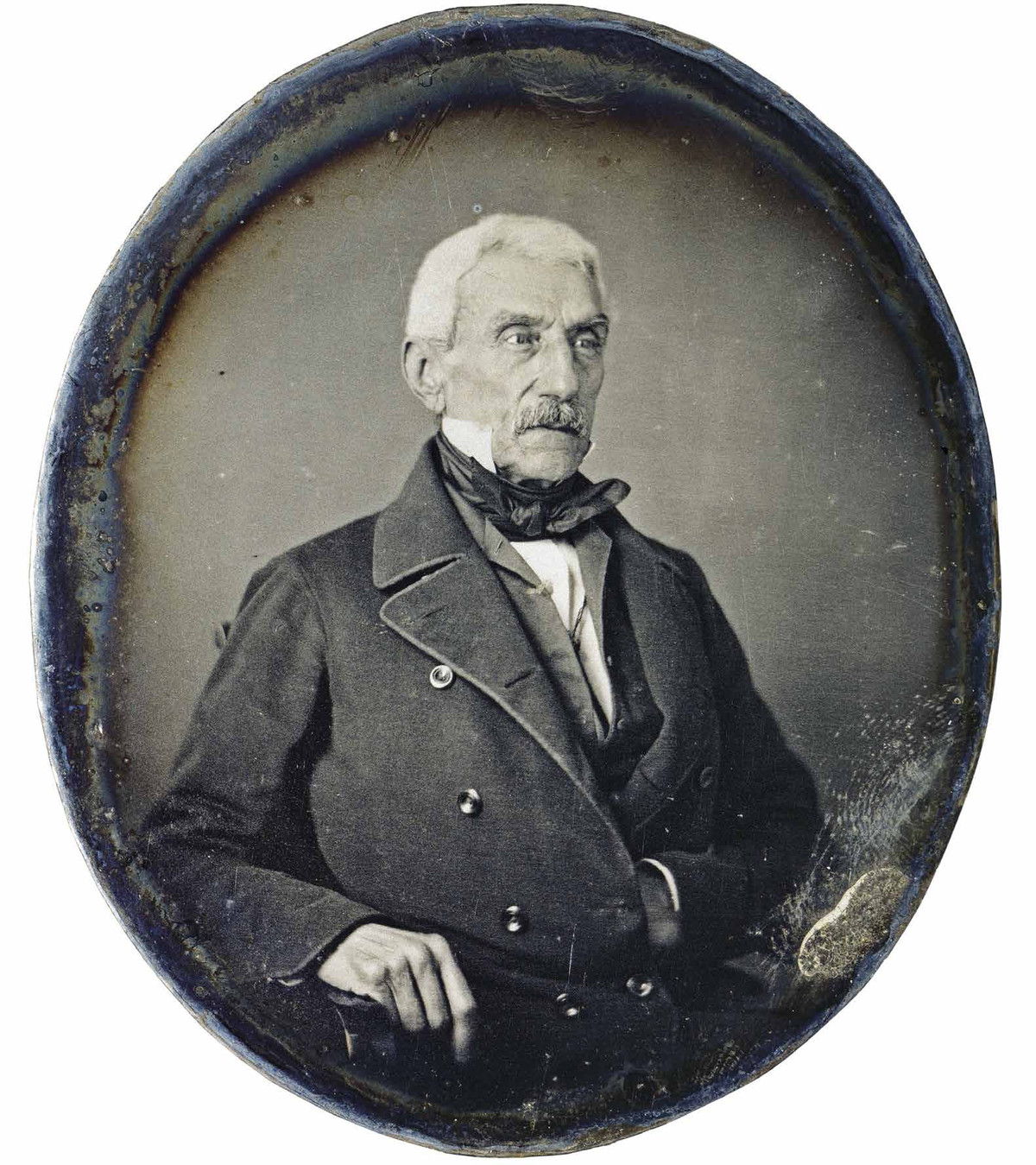
Photograph of General San Martín taken in Paris, 1848.

After his retirement, San Martín intended to live in Cuyo. Although the war of independence had ended in the region, the Argentine Civil Wars continued. The unitarians wanted to organize the country as a unitary state centered on Buenos Aires, and the federalists preferred a federation of provinces. San Martín had good relations with the federal caudillos and a personal feud with unitarian leader Bernardino Rivadavia, but tried to stay neutral. San Martín's wife, María de los Remedios de Escalada, died in 1823, so he returned to Buenos Aires. He took his daughter Mercedes Tomasa, who was living with her mother's family, and sailed to Europe.

After a failed attempt to settle in France, he moved to Britain and then to the capital of present-day Belgium, Brussels, where he settled. He intended to live there until Mercedes completed her education and then return to Argentina. Rivadavia visited Brussels and San Martín intended to challenge him to a duel, but was dissuaded by Diego Paroissien.

Despite his feud with Rivadavia, who was appointed President of Argentina, San Martín offered his military services in the War with Brazil, but received no response. He sailed to the country when Rivadavia was deposed and replaced by the federal Manuel Dorrego, and the war ended in the interim. He intended to return anyway, as a federal government would spare him the persecution he would otherwise have received from the unitarians. He was unable to do as he planned. When his ship docked in Rio de Janeiro he was informed that the unitarian Juan Lavalle had deposed Dorrego, and when he reached Montevideo he was informed that Lavalle had captured and executed Dorrego and begun a campaign of terror against all federals in the country. The ship arrived in Buenos Aires, but San Martín did not leave it, instead returning to Montevideo. Lavalle was unable to put down the federal rebellion against him, and offered San Martín the government. San Martín declined and returned to Brussels.

By this time the federal Juan Manuel de Rosas had begun to pacify the civil war started by Lavalle and earned San Martín's admiration. They began to exchange friendly letters. The Belgian Revolution and the cholera epidemic of 1831 made San Martín leave Brussels and move to Paris, where both San Martín and his daughter became ill. They were helped by Mariano Balcarce. Mariano married Mercedes, and they had a daughter, María Mercedes.

In 1837 France began a blockade of the Rio de la Plata against Rosas. San Martín offered his military services to Rosas, which was declined because of San Martín's advanced age, and condemned the role of the unitarians in that conflict, as they had allied themselves with France against their own nation. San Martín bequeathed his curved saber to Rosas, because of his successful defense of the country. The conflict between France and Argentina renewed in the Anglo-French blockade of the Río de la Plata, which San Martín condemned as well. During this time he met Florencio Varela and Domingo Faustino Sarmiento.

During the French 1848 revolution, San Martin left Paris and moved to Boulogne-sur-Mer, a small city in northern France. He was almost blind and had many health problems because of his advanced age, but continued to write letters and keep in touch with the news from South America. Shortly after receiving the news of the Argentine victory against the Anglo-French blockade, he died, three o'clock on 17 August 1850.

== Remains ==
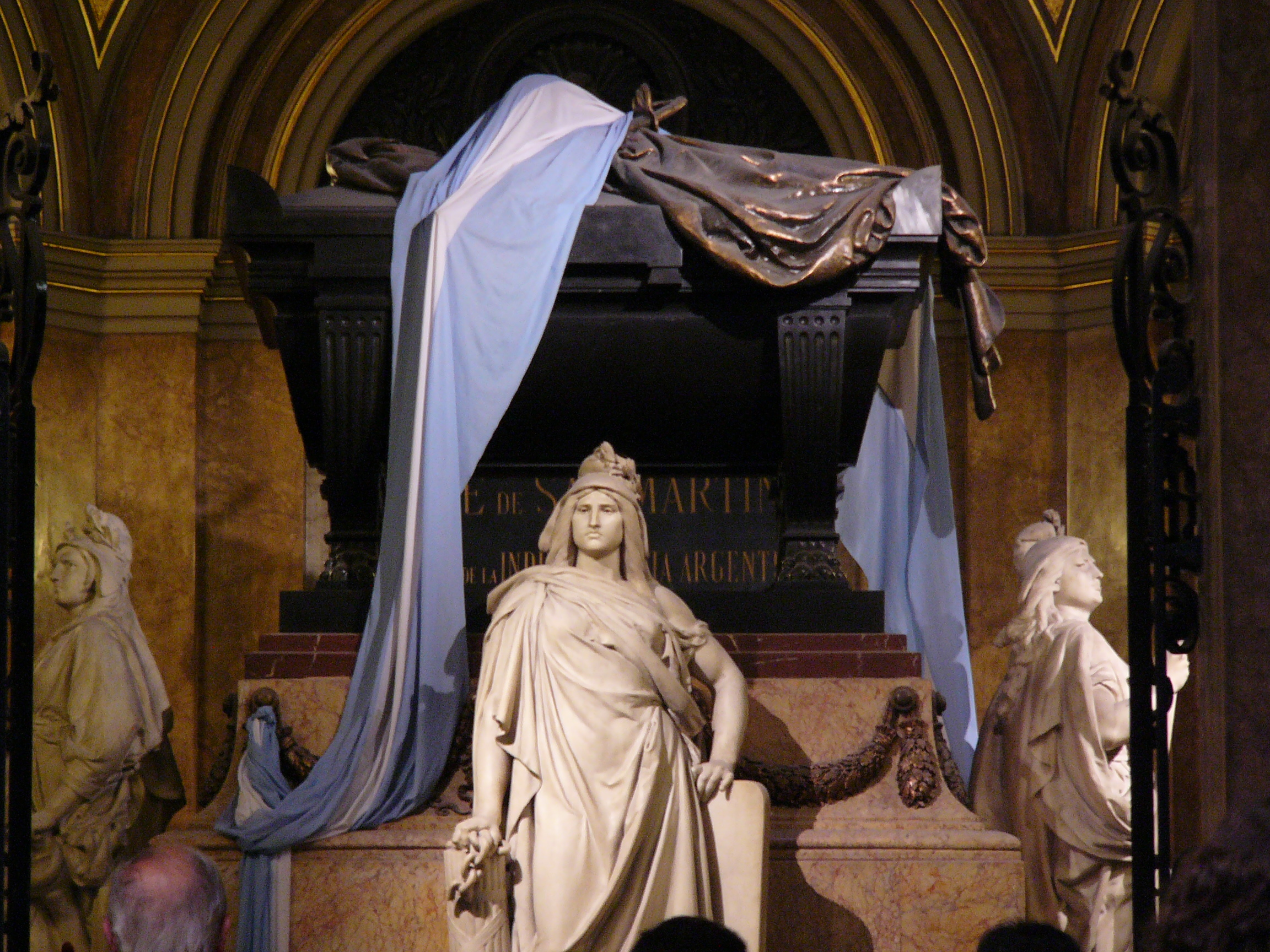
Mausoleum of San Martín at the Buenos Aires Metropolitan Cathedral. The three statues are national personifications of Argentina, Chile and Peru.

José de San Martín died on 17 August 1850, in his house at Boulogne-sur-Mer, France. Between 1850 and 1861, his corpse was buried in the crypt of the Basilica of Notre-Dame de Boulogne. He requested in his will to be taken to the cemetery without any funeral, and to be moved to Buenos Aires thereafter. Balcarce informed Rosas and the foreign minister Felipe Arana of San Martín's death. Balcarce oversaw the embalming of his remains and their temporary stay in a chapel of the city. He also sent San Martin's saber to Rosas.

However, the rebellion of Justo José de Urquiza against Rosas in 1851, Rosas' defeat at the battle of Caseros and the resulting chaos delayed the move of San Martín's remains to Buenos Aires. Still, both Rosas and Urquiza organized public homages to San Martín, despite the conflict. Buenos Aires seceded from Argentina as the state of Buenos Aires, dominated by Unitarians who despised San Martín. Thus, the move of his remains was postponed indefinitely. Aware that there were no favorable conditions for the project, Balcarce arranged a creation of a tomb in the Boulogne-sur-Mer cemetery.

San Martín's remains were finally repatriated on 29 May 1880, during the presidency of Nicolás Avellaneda. The mausoleum was placed inside the Buenos Aires Metropolitan Cathedral. As San Martín was suspected of being a freemason, the mausoleum was placed in an expanded wing of the cathedral.

== Legacy ==
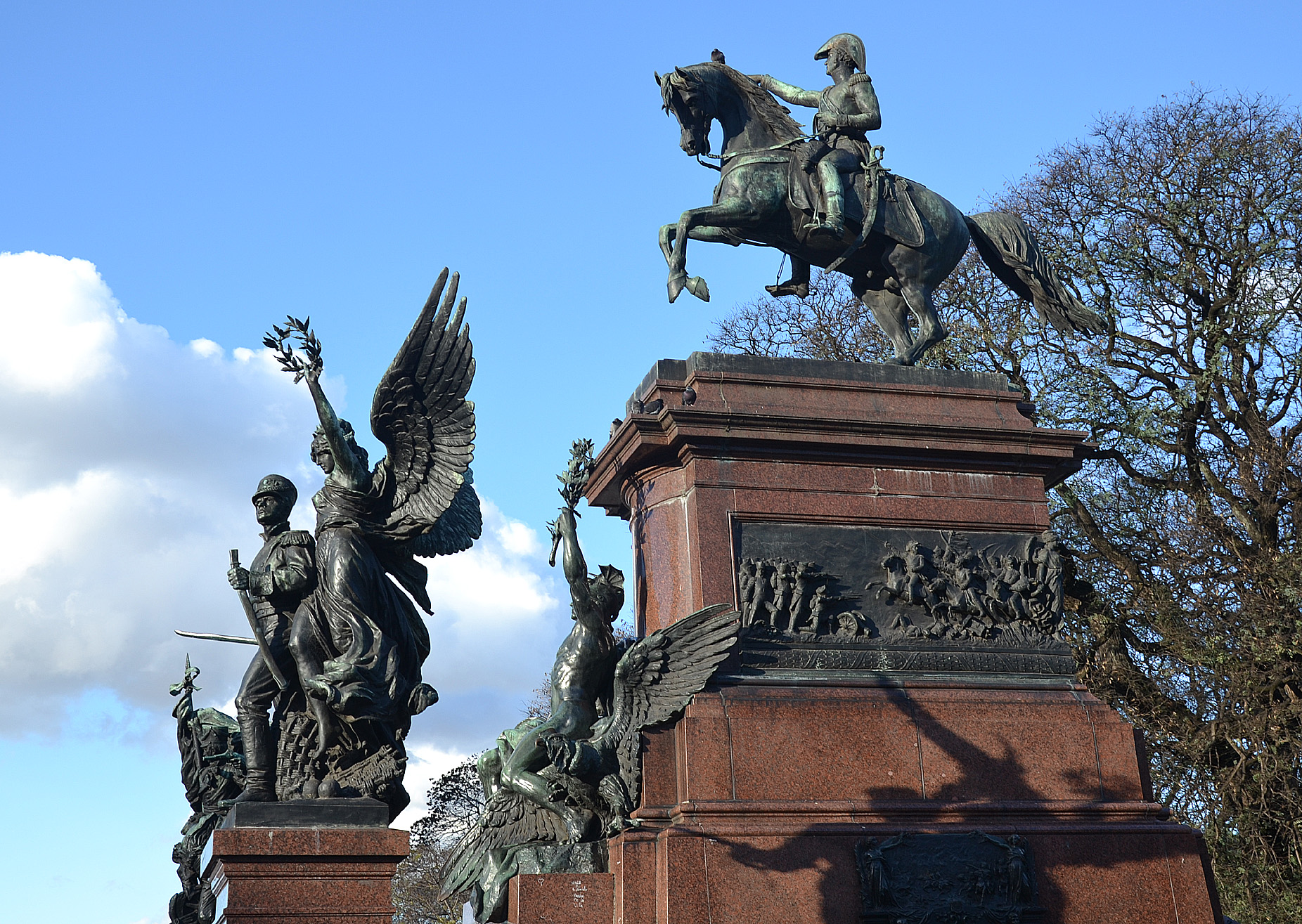
Monument to San Martin at Plaza San Martín in downtown Buenos Aires

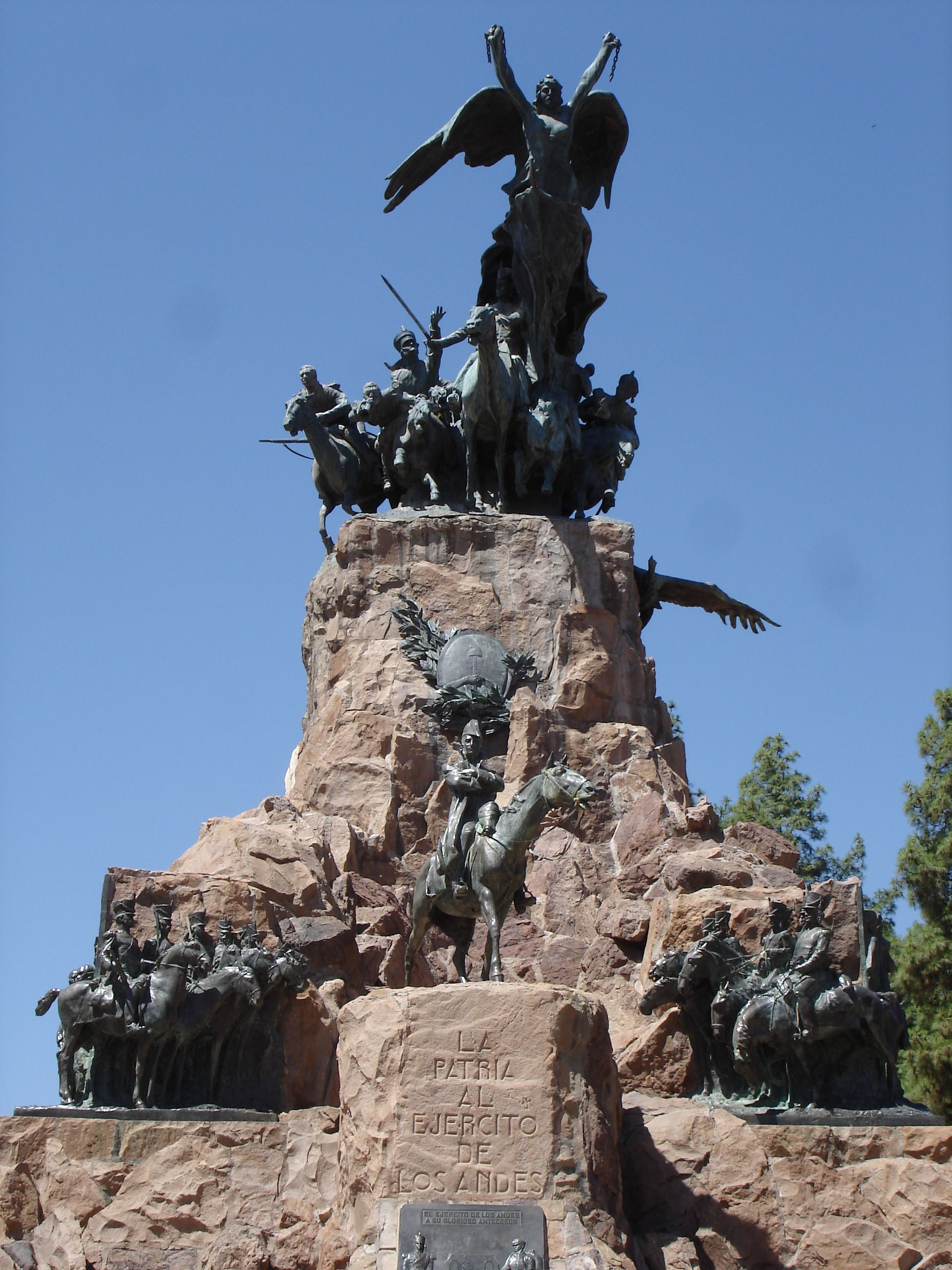
The Cerro de la Gloria, monument to the Army of the Andes at Mendoza, Argentina, with an equestrian statue of San Martín.

San Martín was first acclaimed as a national hero of Argentina by the Federals, both during his life and immediately after his death. The unitarians still resented his refusal to aid the Supreme Directors with the Army of the Andes and his constant support to Rosas. The unitarian Bartolomé Mitre wrote a biography of San Martín, "Historia de San Martín y de la emancipación sudamericana" (Spanish: History of San Martín and the South American emancipation). By that time, several accounts of San Martín were under way in many countries: Valentín Ledesma from Lima wrote in 1853 about San Martín's campaign in Peru, and Benjamín Vicuña Mackenna from Chile wrote in 1856 about the Chilean War of Independence. With Mitre's book, San Martín was universally acclaimed as the Liberator of Argentina, but his work introduced several inaccuracies to make San Martín's campaign support Mitre's political project. These inaccuracies were detected and fixed by later historians.

Statues of San Martín appear in most cities of Argentina, as well as in Santiago de Chile and Lima. José Gil de Castro made the first portrait of San Martín, and several other artists made works about him. An equestrian statue of the General was erected in Boulogne-sur-Mer; the statue was inaugurated on 24 October 1909, at a ceremony attended by several units from the Argentine military.

Outside of Argentina, there is an equestrian statue of General San Martín in Washington D.C. along NW Virginia Street. It is a copy of a statue in Buenos Aires. It was “presented by the Argentine people to the people of the United States (...) unveiled with appropriate ceremony on October 28, 1925.”

There is also an equestrian statue of General San Martín in New York City, on the southern side of Central Park. It was dedicated in 1951 and was donated by the City of Buenos Aires, Argentina.

Several countries have commemorated San Martin on their postage stamps, including Argentina, Chile, Peru and the United States.

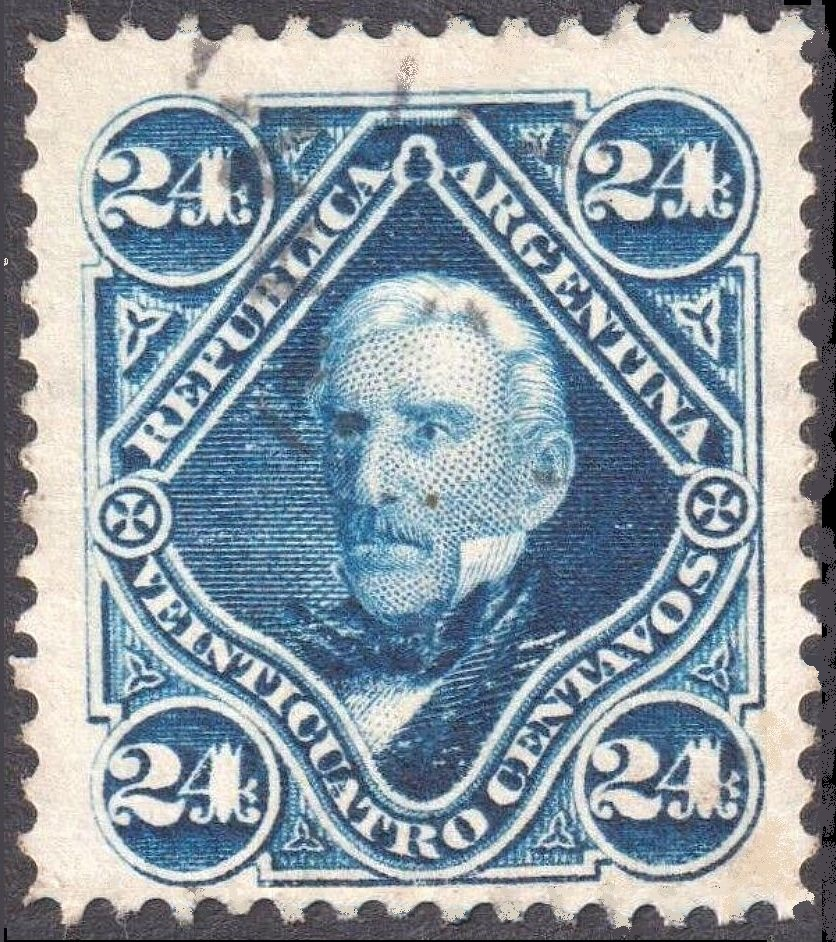
In 1887, the government of Argentina issued a postage stamp depicting San Martin in elder years.

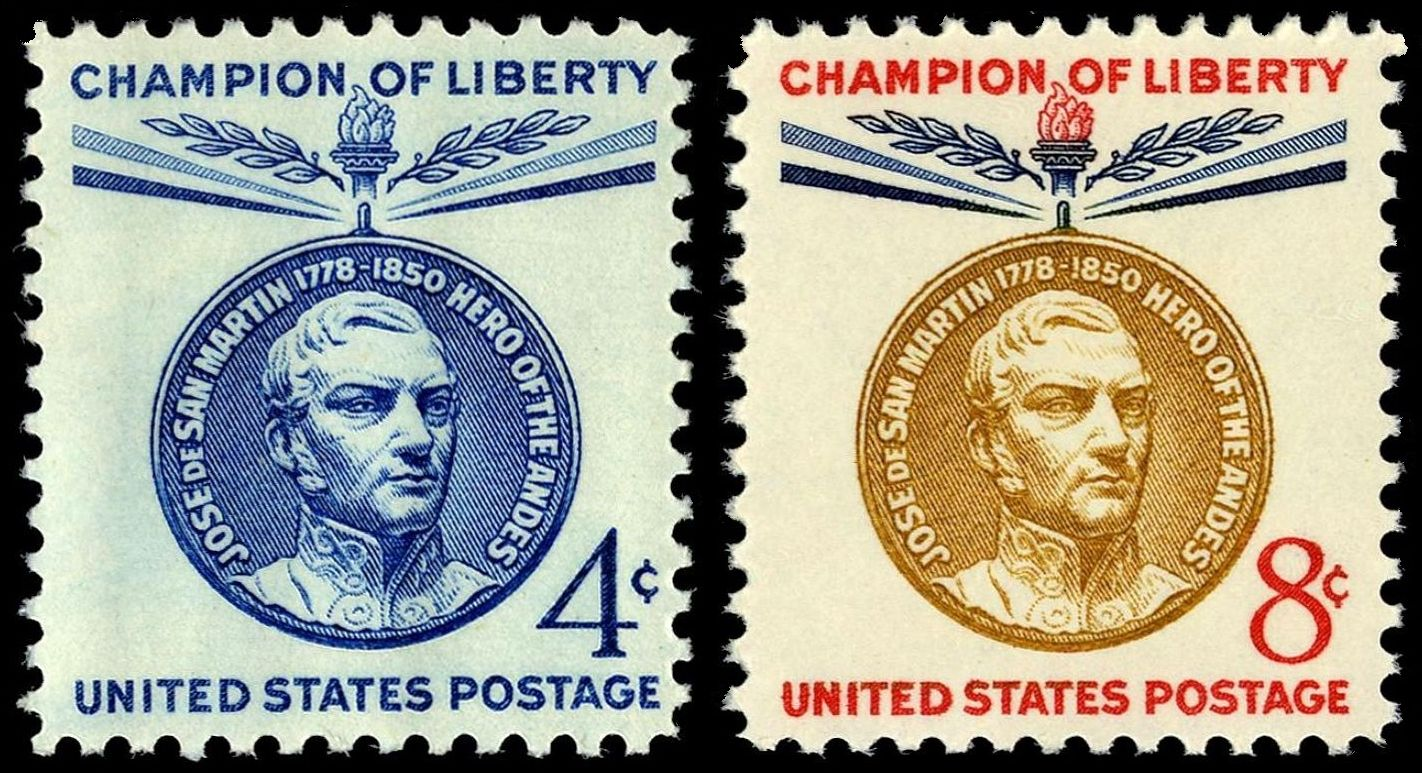
In 1959 the US Government issued two postage stamps in honor of José de San Martín, part of the "Champion of Liberty" postal issues

There is a memorial featuring a bust of General San Martín in Beverly Hills, CA. The bust was designed by Fernando Di Zitti and dedicated in 2001.

There is also a bust of San Martin at the Intramuros or Walled City of Manila, which was erected in 1950 at the request of the Perón government as a reminder that San Martin's brother, Juan Fermin, served in the Philippines from 1801 to 1822 and left descendants there.

== Bibliography ==
- Lynch, John. San Martin: Argentine Soldier, American Hero
- Lynch, John. The Spanish American Revolutions 1808–1826 (2nd ed. 1986)
- Abad de Santillán, Diego (1965). Historia Argentina (in Spanish). Buenos Aires: TEA (Tipográfica Editora Argentina).
- Camogli, Pablo; de Privitellio, Luciano (2005). Batallas por la Libertad (in Spanish). Buenos Aires: Aguilar. ISBN 978-987-04-0105-6.
- Galasso, Norberto (2000). Seamos libres y lo demás no importa nada [Let us be free and nothing else matters] (in Spanish). Buenos Aires: Colihue. ISBN 978-950-581-779-5.
- Jaksic, Ivan (2006). Andrés Bello: Scholarship and Nation-Building in Nineteenth-Century Latin America. Cambridge University Press. ISBN 978-0-521-02759-5.
- Mayochi, Enrique Mario. "San Martín visto por los artistas" [San Martín saw by artists] (in Spanish). San Martín National Institute. Archived from the original on 1 June 2012.
- Murray, Pamela S. (2014). Women and gender in modern Latin America: historical sources and interpretations. New York (NY): Routledge. ISBN 978-0-415-89454-8.

Preceded by None	President of Peru; 1821–1822	Succeeded by Francisco Xavier de Luna Pizarro
Preceded by José Miguel Carrera	Commander-in-Chief of the Army of Chile; 1817–1819	Succeeded by Bernardo O'Higgins
Preceded by Marcos Balcarce	Governor of Cuyo; 1814–1816	Succeeded by Toribio Luzuriaga
