= Baigorria =

Baigorria may refer to:

- Manuel Baigorria
- Juan Bautista Baigorria
- Granadero Baigorria
