= Carlos Javier Benielli =

Argentine writer, poet and educator

Carlos Javier Benielli (March 26, 1878, in Mendoza – November 4, 1934, in Buenos Aires) was an Argentine writer, poet and educator. He penned the lyrics for marches and hymns that are dedicated to famous figures from Argentinian history, many of which have become part of that nation's common cultural heritage.

Benielli studied teaching in Mendoza. In 1897, he became a professor at the Escuela Normal de Profesores "Mariano Acosta" in the Balvanera district of Buenos Aires. Later, he was posted to a teaching position in Venado Tuerto, Santa Fe Province. While there, he made friends with Cayetano Alberto Silva, a violinist and composer. As a result, in April 1907 he wrote the lyrics to the San Lorenzo March (composed by Silva in 1901). This march (his most famous work), commemorates the Battle of San Lorenzo and memorializes the heroic actions of sergeant Juan Bautista Cabral. He also wrote lyrics for marches commemorating the battles of Tuyutí and Curupaytí (both also with music by Silva) and the Hymn to San Martín (set to the music of the Triumphal March from the opera "Aida" by Verdi). He is also the author of a book; Menudencias Lingüísticas (Linguistic Trifles).

Benielli dedicated 43 years of his life to teaching. He was the founding director of Escuela 22, located at Calle Sánchez de Bustamante 260 (Buenos Aires). In 1969, the school was named in his honor. Escuela 6392 (founded in 1953) in the Bouchard district of San Lorenzo, on National Route 11, also bears his name.

He died in Buenos Aires in 1934. In 2005, his remains were transferred to the cemetery at the Convent of San Lorenzo, where the Regiment of Mounted Grenadiers performs an annual ceremony in his honor.

== See also ==
- Buenos Aires: Historia de las Calles y Sus Nombres, by Vicente Osvaldo Cutolo. Editorial Elche (1992) ISBN 950-9921-20-3
