= Eugenio Necochea =

Chilean soldier

Eugenio Necochea (born in Buenos Aires in 1797; died in Santiago de Chile in 1867) was a Chilean soldier.

== Biography ==
From his early years, he was deeply interested in the struggle for the independence of Chile, and in 1813 engaged in the campaign of Santa Fé. In 1817 he formed part of the Army of the Andes as lieutenant of mounted grenadiers under his brother Mariano, and participated in the campaign of Chile until 1820, being promoted major. He then took part in the campaign of Peru until 1823, and reached the rank of colonel.

In 1824 he obtained leave of absence from the Peruvian army and returned to Buenos Aires, where he remained till 1836. In that year, he went back to Chile and was appointed intendant of the province of Chiloe. In 1837 he re-entered the Chilean army and was made commander of the cavalry in the Peruvian expedition, but after the death of vice president Diego Portales and the consequent failure of the expedition he was appointed military governor of Valparaíso. He became substitute judge of the military court of appeals in 1842, judge in 1846, intendant of the province of Maule in 1849, and in 1856 inspector general of militia and military commander of the province of Santiago. He was several times a member of the Chamber of Deputies of Chile and provincial elector, and in 1860 was promoted brigadier.
