= Mariano Necochea =

Argentine-Peruvian soldier

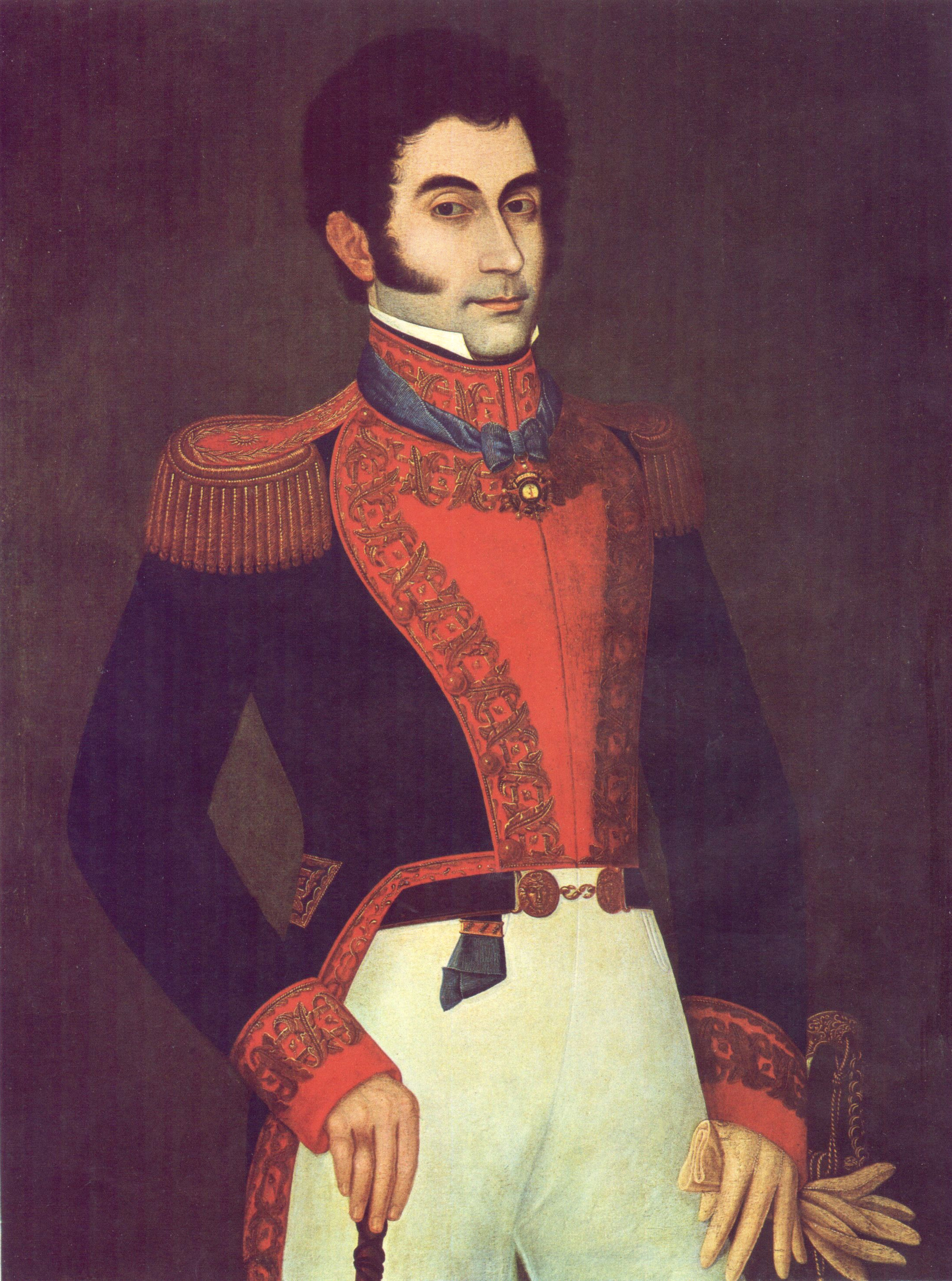
Retrato de Mariano Necochea

Mariano Necochea (7 September 1790, in Buenos Aires – 1849 in Miraflores, near Lima) was an Argentine-Peruvian soldier.

== Biography ==
In 1802, he was sent to Spain for his education, but he was obliged to return to Argentina in 1811 on account of the death of his father. He took an active part in the struggle for independence, and was in the campaigns in upper Peru from 1811 until 1814.

Necochea took part of the Battle of San Lorenzo, on February 3, 1813, under the command of General José de San Martín. In 1817 he went to Chile in the Army of the Andes as commander of a regiment of mounted grenadiers, and took part in the whole campaign of Chile under José de San Martín. He accompanied the latter to Peru, was promoted brigadier for his valor in the siege of Callao, and afterward as commander of cavalry engaged in the campaign of Peru, assisting in the battle of Junin, 6 August 1824, where he was dangerously wounded and saved from death by a Spanish soldier who formerly had served under him in the Army of the Andes. He was promoted general of division.

After the independence of Peru was established, he returned to Buenos Aires, where he took part as commander of a body of volunteer cavalry in the war against Brazil in 1826–27. In the latter year he returned to Peru, participated in the war against Colombia, and was commander of Guayaquil in 1828.

In consequence of a military conspiracy in Lima, Necochea, with several other officers, was summarily ordered to leave the country without a hearing, and he returned to the congress his commission as general, saying that he wished to carry from Peru nothing but his honorable wounds. Later, when his innocence was recognized, he returned to Peru and received the rank of grand marshal, but saw no more active service, and retired to private life.

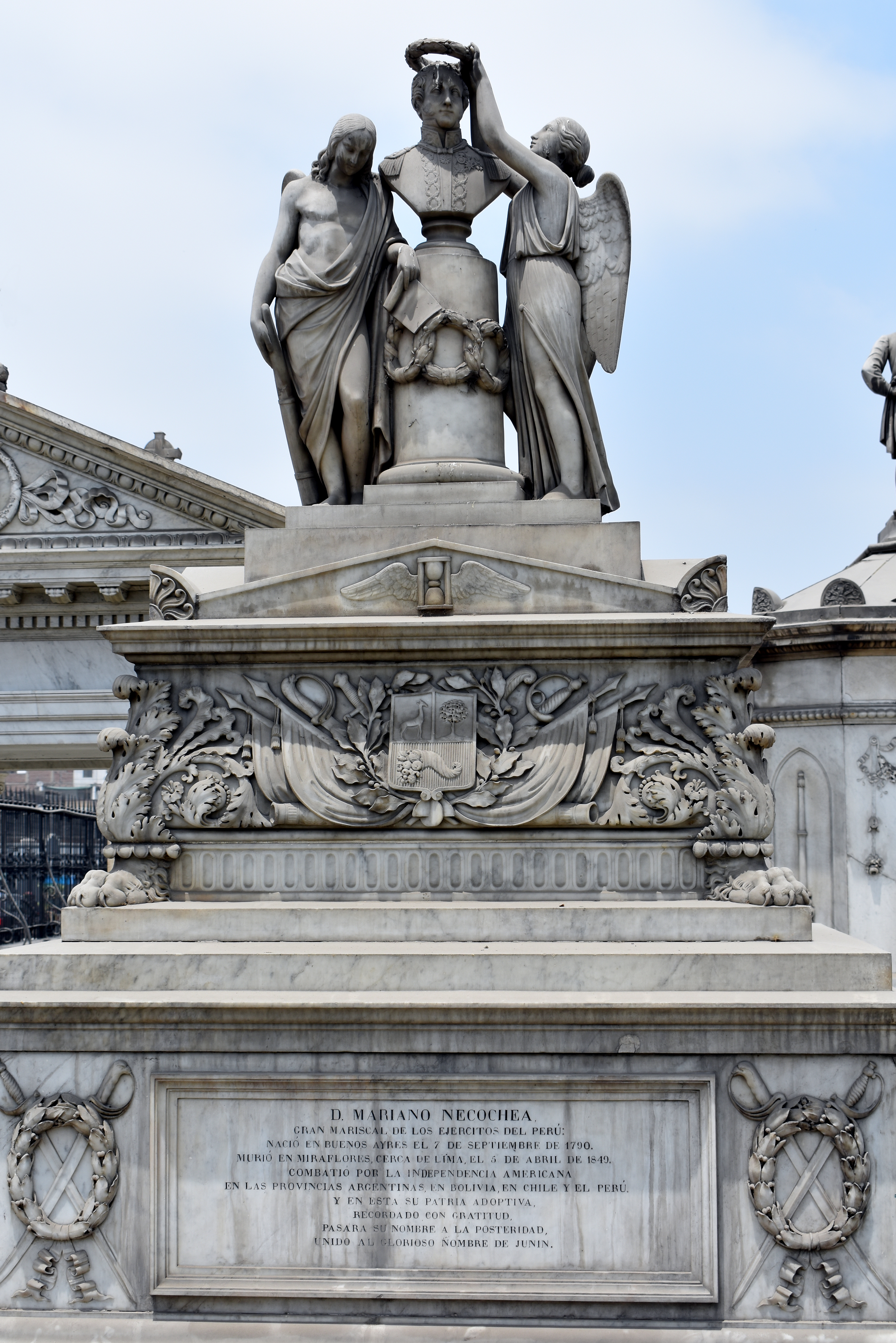
Tumba Mariano Necochea en Cementerio Presbítero Matías Maestro, Lima

Mariano Necochea is buried in the Cementerio Presbítero Matías Maestro in Lima, Perú.

== Family ==
His brother Eugenio Necochea was a noted soldier for Chile and fought beside him on occasion.
