= San Lorenzo march =

Argentine military march

San Lorenzo
- March of Argentina
- Lyrics: Carlos Javier Benielli, 1907; 119 years ago
- Music: Cayetano Alberto Silva, 1901; 125 years ago

Audio sample
- Performed by the United States Marine Band: file; help

The San Lorenzo march is an Argentine military march first composed instrumentally in 1901 by Cayetano Alberto Silva, whose lyrics by Carlos Javier Benielli were later added in 1907. The unsung work was initially dedicated to Pablo Riccheri, premiered in 1902 in Rosario, Santa Fe. Benielli's lyrics celebrate the role played by the Regiment of Mounted Grenadiers commanded by José de San Martín at the Battle of San Lorenzo during the Argentine War of Independence, with special mention to Sergeant Juan Bautista Cabral.

It was later incorporated into the musical repertoires of other military bands around the world.

== Creation ==
On July 8, 1901, at his home in Venado Tuerto, Santa Fe, Cayetano Silva composed a march dedicated to José de San Martín. He did so following a proposal from Representative Celestino Pera. He initially considered naming it "San Martín", but he changed his mind and named it "San Lorenzo" instead. The Battle of San Lorenzo is the only battle that San Martín fought within the territory of modern Argentina. The city of San Lorenzo, where the battle was fought, was the birthplace of Pablo Ricchieri (the Argentine War Minister in 1901), and Silva dedicated the march to him.

The march was publicly performed for the first time on October 30, 1902, at the opening ceremony for the monument to General San Martín in Plaza San Martín (Rosario), in the presence of President Julio Argentino Roca and Ricchieri. His neighbor, Carlos Javier Benielli, added lyrics to the march in 1907, with a description of the battle and the role of Juan Bautista Cabral in it.

== Lyrics ==
Spanish original

Febo asoma, ya sus rayos
iluminan el histórico convento.
Tras los muros, sordos ruidos
oír se dejan de corceles y de acero.

Son las huestes que prepara
San Martín para luchar en San Lorenzo.
El clarín estridente sonó
y la voz del gran jefe a la carga ordenó.

Avanza el enemigo a paso redoblado,
𝄆 al viento desplegado, su rojo pabellón. 𝄇
Y nuestros granaderos, aliados de la gloria,
𝄆 inscriben en la historia su página mejor. 𝄇

Cabral, soldado heroico,
cubriéndose de gloria,
cual precio a la victoria,
su vida rinde, haciéndose inmortal.

Y allí salvó su arrojo,
la libertad naciente
de medio continente.
¡Honor, honor al gran Cabral!

(interlude and repeat last 4 lines)

English translation

Phoebus rises, and now his rays
light up the historic convent.
Behind its walls, the muffled sounds
of steeds and steel can be heard.

They are the hosts being prepared
by San Martín to fight in San Lorenzo.
Then the clarion stridently sounded
and the voice of the great chief ordered the charge.

The enemy advances at redoubled path,
𝄆 To the wind deployed, their red banner. 𝄇
And our grenadiers allied with glory
𝄆 write down in history their best page. 𝄇

Cabral, heroic soldier,
covered in glory
and as price for that victory
he gave up his life, becoming immortal.

And there his boldness saved
the raising freedom
of half a continent.
Honour, honour to great Cabral!

(interlude and repeat last 4 lines)

== Notable performances ==
The march became famous in other countries over time and, according to the Argentine British Community Council, is currently considered in Europe one of the best five military marches ever written. It was played during the coronations of George V and Elizabeth II, in 1911 and 1953 respectively, with prior approval sought by the British government from Argentina. The march is also played during the changing of the guard at Buckingham Palace, although it was suspended during the Falklands War.

It was exchanged with the German Army for their Alte Kameraden, before World War II, and it was played in Paris during the German occupation of France during World War II as a result. The Supreme Allied Commander, General Dwight D. Eisenhower, sought to redress this by having it played during the entrance of the Allied army that liberated Paris after the successful Operation Overlord.

The United States Marine Band recorded the march in 1992, included it in the album Sound Off. In 2023, Abel Pintos recorded and sang the march with the Orchestral Academy of Teatro Colón, and included it on his album Alta en el cielo.
