= Saladas, Corrientes =

Saladas Saláda (Guarani)
- Town
- Location of Saladas in Argentina
- Coordinates: 28°15′S 58°37′W
- Country: Argentina
- Province: Corrientes
- Department: Saladas
- Established: November 19, 1732
- Elevation: 77 m (253 ft)

Population
  - Total: 18,349
- Demonym: saladeña/o
- Time zone: UTC−3 (ART)
- CPA base: W3420
- Dialing code: +54 3782

Saladas (Guarani: Saláda) is a town in Corrientes Province, Argentina. It was established on November 19, 1732 that is 97 km (60 mi) from the provincial capital.

It is the administrative seat of Saladas Department.

Saladas is the birthplace of Juan Bautista Cabral (born 1789), a soldier in the war of independence.
