= Cayetano Alberto Silva =

Uruguayan musician and author

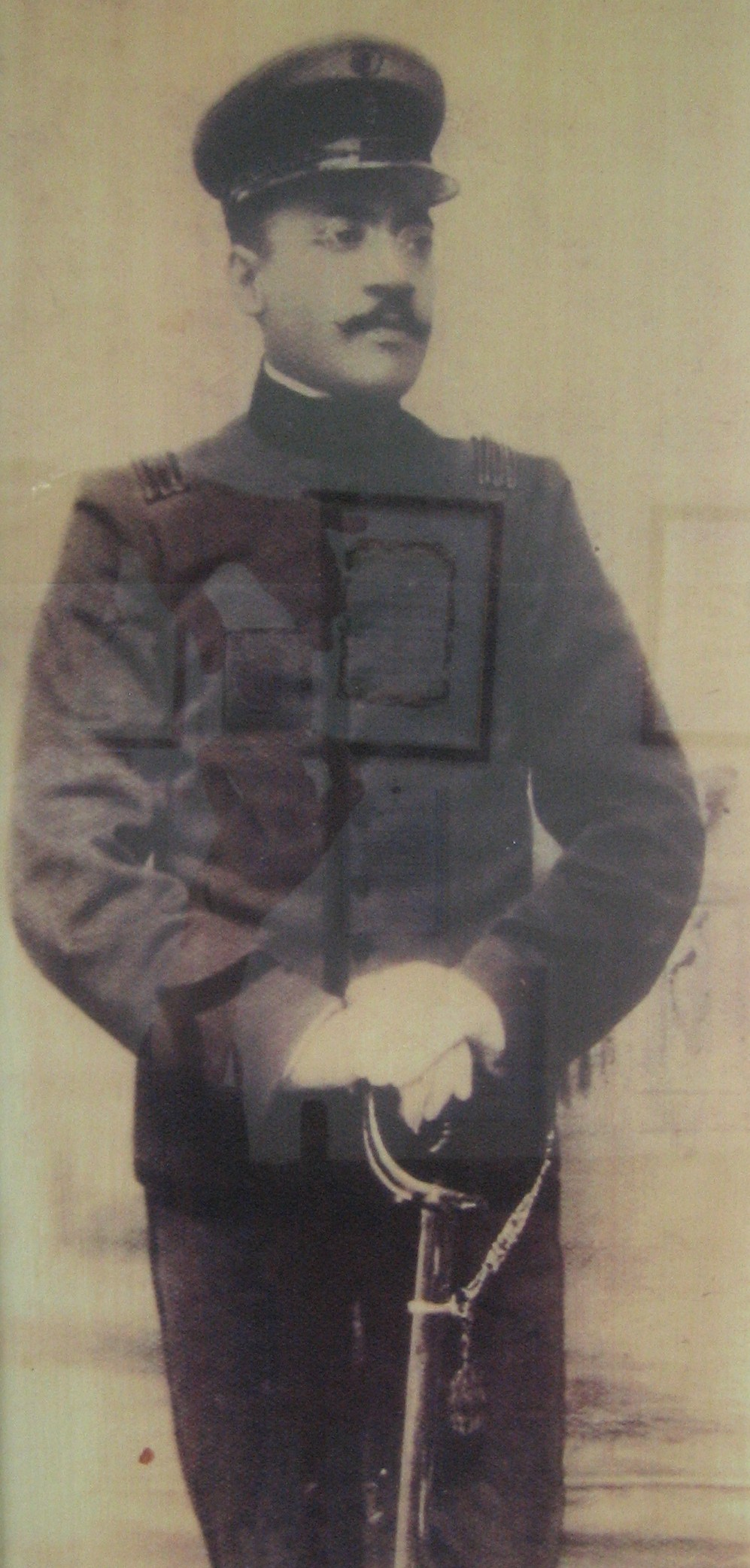

Background information
- Born: August 7, 1868; San Carlos, Uruguay
- Died: January 12, 1920 (aged 51) Rosario, Argentina
- Genres: Marches
- Occupation(s): Musician, Composer
- Instrument(s): Horn, Violin
- Years active: 1894–1920

Cayetano Alberto Silva (August 7, 1868 — January 12, 1920) was an Uruguayan musician, naturalized Argentine, and author; his work includes the San Lorenzo march, the official march of the Argentine army.

== Early life ==
Silva was born on August 17, 1868, in the department of Maldonado in San Carlos, Uruguay. His mother was Natalia Silva, a black slave of the family who gave her the surname. Cayetano Silva studied with Francisco Rinaldi of the Popular Band of San Carlos. In 1879, he attended the School of Arts and Crafts of Montevideo, where he joined its music band directed by Gerardo Grasso, who taught him music theory, horn, and violin. In 1888, he left the school to attend social centers of workers' agitation, theaters, and music conservatories in Montevideo.

In 1889, he traveled to Buenos Aires, Argentina, where he ventured to the Teatro Colón and attended the School of Music directed by Pablo Berutti. He later moved to the city of Rosario, Province of Santa Fe; on February 1, 1894, he was appointed director of the Seventh Infantry Regiment band. In Rosario, he married Filomena Santanelli, with whom he raised eight children.

Silva and his family moved to Venado Tuerto in 1898 after being hired by the Italian Society of Venado Tuerto. He founded a lyrical center, taught music, and created a rondalla—an ensemble of plucked string instruments—with which he performed during the Carnival of 1900. He wrote the music for the plays Canillita and Cedulas de San Juan for his compatriot friend Florencio Sánchez; both works were premiered in Rosario.

== La Marcha San Lorenzo ==
On July 8, 1901, at his home in Venado Tuerto, he composed a march dedicated to Colonel Pablo Ricchieri, then war minister of that country and modernizer of the Argentine army. Ricchieri thanked him for the homage, but requested the title be changed to San Lorenzo, the city where Riccheri was born. The march was publicly performed for the first time on October 30, 1902, in San Lorenzo, in the vicinity of the historic San Carlos Convent, where the Battle of San Lorenzo took place. That day, the march was designated the official march of the Argentine Army. Two days after, Silva played it again at the opening ceremony for the monument to General San Martín in Plaza San Martín (Rosario), in the presence of President Julio Argentino Roca and Ricchieri.

In 1906, Silva became master of the Third Infantry Regiment. His neighbor, Carlos Javier Benielli, added the lyrics in 1907 that would later be adapted for schools. Years later, affected by poverty, Cayetano Silva sold the rights to the march to an editor in Buenos Aires for a negligible amount.

The march became famous in other countries over time to such an extent that it was played on June 22, 1911, during the coronations of King George V and Mary of Teck (with prior approval sought by the British government from Argentina). In addition, the march is played during the changing of the guard at Buckingham Palace, although it was suspended during the Falklands War. It was also played by the Germans when they entered Paris during World War II. General Dwight D. Eisenhower also had it played during the entrance of the Allied army following the liberation of Paris.

While residing in Mendoza, he founded the Firefighters Music Band of that city and worked as an educator.

== Other works ==
Other marches composed by Cayetano Silva were: Black River, Anglo Boers, July 22, San Genaro (in honor of the city of the same name near Rosario), Curapaytí (1906, inspired by the Paraguayan War), and Tuyutí. Like the San Lorenzo March, the lyrics of the latter two were also written by Benielli.

== Final years ==
Silva was also a police employee in Rosario. In 1920, after dying of serious health problems in that city, he was denied burial in the Police Pantheon because he was black, and was buried in a grave without a name. In 1997, however, his remains were transferred to the municipal cemetery of Venado Tuerto, through efforts made by the association Friends of the Historical House "Cayetano A. Silva". This house—headquarters of the regional museum, historical archives, and headquarters of the Cayetano A. Silva Municipal band is located where the composer once lived, at Maipú 966, Venado Tuerto (Province of Santa Fe).

== Bibliography ==
- Cutolo, Vicente Osvaldo (1988). Buenos Aires—Historia de las calles y sus nombres [Buenos Aires: History of the streets and their names] (in Spanish). Elche.
- Schávelzon, Daniel (2003). Buenos Aires Negra: arqueología histórica de una ciudad silenciada (in Spanish). Emecé Editores. p. 17. ISBN 978-950-04-2459-2.
