= Saladas Department =

Saladas Department Departamento Saladas (Spanish) Tetãvore Saláda (Guarani)
- Department
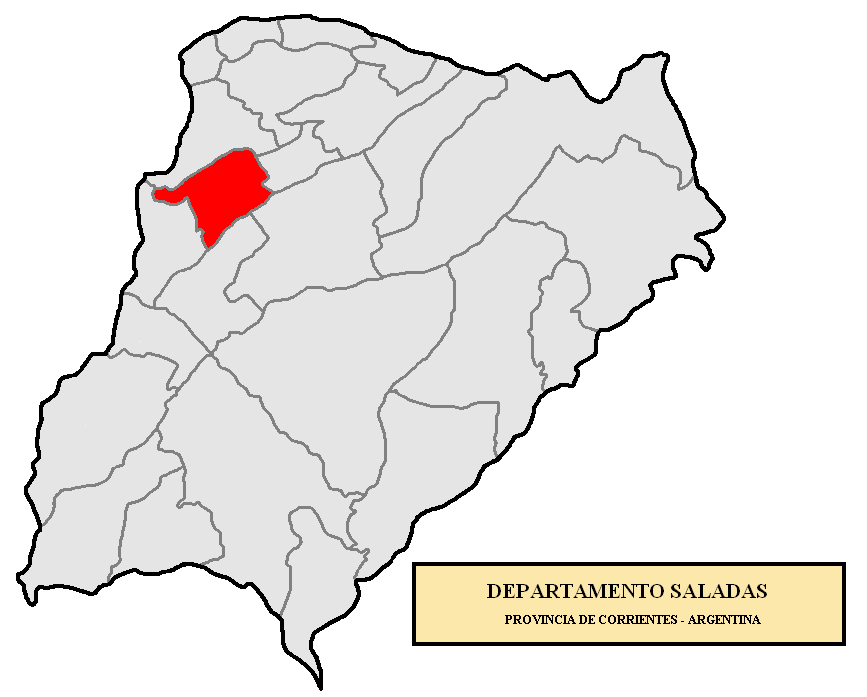
- location of Saladas Department in Corrientes Province
- Coordinates: 28°15′S 58°37′W
- Country: Argentina
- Seat: Saladas

Area
  - Total: 1,981 km^{2} (765 sq mi)

Population (2001 census [INDEC])
  - Total: 21,470
  - Density: 10.84/km^{2} (28.07/sq mi)
- Demonym: saladeña/o
- Postal Code: W3420
- Area Code: 003782

Saladas Department is a department of Corrientes Province in Argentina.

The provincial subdivision has a population of about 21,470 inhabitants in an area of 1,981 km^{2} (765 sq mi), and its capital city is Saladas, which is located around 930 km (580 mi) from Capital Federal.

== Settlements ==
- Saladas
- San Lorenzo
