= Battle of San Lorenzo =

1813 Argentine War of Independence battle

- Part of the Second Banda Oriental campaign
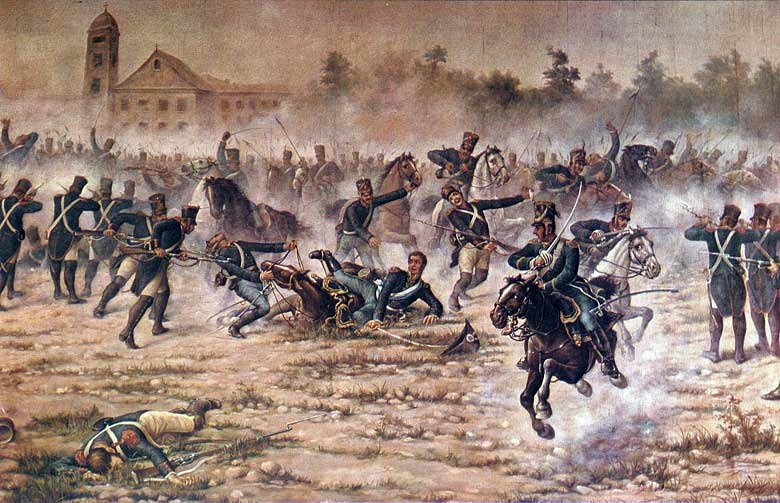
- Painting of the battle by Ángel Della Valle.
Date	3 February 1813
Location	San Lorenzo, Santa Fe 32°44′45″S 60°43′45″W
Result	Patriot victory

Belligerents
United Provinces of the Río de la Plata	(Spain) Viceroyalty of the Río de la Plata

Commanders and leaders
José de San Martín (WIA)	(Spain) Militia Capt. Antonio Zabala

Units involved
Regiment of Mounted Grenadiers	(Spain) Urban Militia of Montevideo

Strength
140 mounted grenadiers 70 militia	250 Montevideo militia 2 cannons

Casualties and losses
16 killed 22 wounded	40 killed 14 wounded & captured 2 cannons

The Battle of San Lorenzo was fought on 3 February 1813 in San Lorenzo, Argentina, then part of the United Provinces of the Río de la Plata. The royalist troops were composed of militiamen recruited in Montevideo under the command of militia captain Antonio Zabala, who were defeated by the Regiment of Mounted Grenadiers under the command of José de San Martín. This battle was the baptism by fire for this military unit, as well as for San Martín in the Spanish American wars of independence.

Montevideo, a royalist stronghold during the Argentine War of Independence, was under siege by José Gervasio Artigas. Those in the city raided population centres along the nearby rivers for supplies. San Martín, who shortly before had arrived in Buenos Aires and formed the regiment, followed the royalist ships to San Lorenzo. The area around San Lorenzo formed a large empty plain, so the regiment hid inside the San Carlos Convent during the night and San Martín studied the battlefield and the enemy ships from the tower. The battle started at dawn, when the grenadiers made a surprise pincer movement to trap the enemy forces. One column was led by San Martín, and the other by Justo Germán Bermúdez. San Martín fell from his horse, and was nearly killed, but Juan Bautista Cabral and Juan Bautista Baigorria intervened and saved him. The royalists were defeated, but continued to raid villages for some time afterwards.

This was the only battle fought by San Martín in the modern territory of Argentina. The city of San Lorenzo keeps historic memorials of the battle and it is referenced in the San Lorenzo march.

== Prelude ==
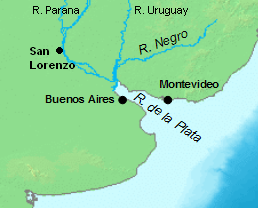
Location of San Lorenzo, Buenos Aires and Montevideo at the La Plata Basin

Although Buenos Aires had suffered a difficult period in its war for independence, its prospects were improving by 1812. Even though the defeats of Manuel Belgrano during the Paraguay campaign and Juan José Castelli in the first Upper Peru campaign had generated a political crisis, Belgrano's victory at the Battle of Tucumán had given new hope to the revolution, which would be strengthened shortly afterwards with the victory at the Battle of Salta. Montevideo, capital of the Viceroyalty of the Río de la Plata since the May Revolution, was under siege by both an army from Buenos Aires led by José Rondeau and a Uruguayan one led by José Gervasio Artigas. The city, however, maintained its river fleet over Buenos Aires and their vessels raided the coasts of the Paraná and Uruguay rivers to gather supplies, despite the siege. Montevideo organized a fleet to destroy the gun batteries at Rosario and Punta Gorda, two population centres along the Paraná, but were prevented from doing so as Buenos Aires dismantled them knowing that they could not be defended.

The royalist troops that would raid San Lorenzo comprised eleven minors vessels of varying sizes, two hundred and fifty militiamen and fifty sailors. They moved into the Paraná through its tributary, the Paraná Guazú River, slowed down by headwinds. The Second Triumvirate promoted José de San Martín to colonel and instructed him to follow them with the Regiment of Mounted Grenadiers and stop the raids. San Martín was influenced by Napoleonic warfare and trained the regiment with the most recent military techniques used in the Napoleonic Wars.

San Martín moved the regiment from Retiro to Rosario, nearing the river at San Pedro and San Nicolás. He was following the Spanish ships and moved at night to avoid detection. San Martín had one hundred and twenty men for this action, reinforced at Rosario by a militia of seventy men under the command of Celedonio Escalada. Those reinforcements included twenty-two rifleman, thirty cavalry, a small cannon and men armed with knives. Escalada had made other actions against the royalists before this battle. San Martín discovered that the royalists intended to pillage the San Carlos Convent and pressed the march to arrive there first. One-hundred royalists landed on San Lorenzo, but the only food available to them was some chickens and watermelons. Aware of the risk of pillage, the population had removed the cattle from the area before the royalists arrived. Escalada arrived in San Lorenzo before the bulk of the patriot army, but the dust trail from the path to Rosario revealed their presence. Escalada attacked them but their ship had a longer range than his cannon, keeping him at bay. He was forced to retire when he found a Paraguayan prisoner who had escaped from the ship. The Paraguayan disclosed the size of the royalist army and their plan of attacking the convent with a larger force, suspecting that the local money was kept in it. They did not attack the convent right away, requiring time to prepare the two field cannons. Escalada returned with San Martín and relayed the news. The march from Retiro to the convent took only five days, thanks to the cadet Ángel Pacheco. Pacheco moved ahead of the regiment and prepared horses in advance at the relay positions. The whole army arrived on scene during the night of 2 February and hid inside the convent. They entered through the rear door and were not allowed to light fires or speak during the night. San Martín studied the enemy and the battlefield from the convent's tower, using a monocular.

== Battlefield ==
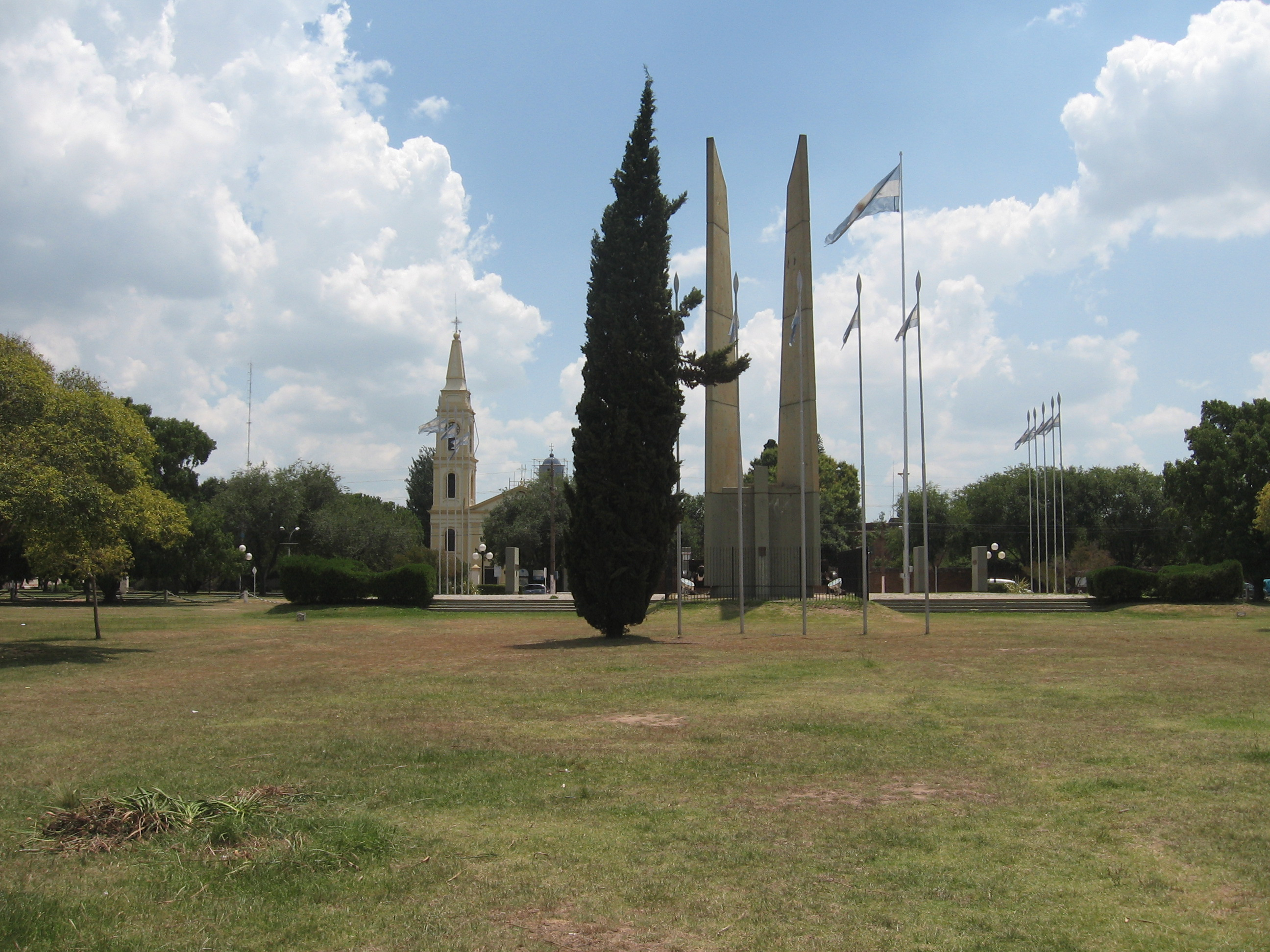
The "Field of Glory" at San Lorenzo, Santa Fe, site of the battle. The San Carlos Convent and the monument of the battle are seen in the background

The battle was fought at the location of the modern city of San Lorenzo, Santa Fe which is next to the Paraná River, at the point of its widest flow. The west bank of the river was tall and steep, forming a natural obstacle, and ships could only land troops and materials on that side of the river using man-made paths cut into the side. The battlefield was near one of these paths, shaped like a ladder, after which the terrain was a big plain with scattered bushes. The San Carlos Convent, the main nearby building, was a short distance away from the river.

The location was not an easy place to defend without artillery, as the plains made surprise attacks difficult. Except for the convent itself, the terrain did not offer any natural barriers that the patriots could exploit. Nevertheless, the flat terrain was ideal for cavalry manoeuvres, and the distance between the church and the west gully gave enough room for a cavalry charge. The royalists, on the other hand, could support their troops with their ships from the river. Without a supporting navy, or local batteries, San Martín had no means to attack the ships. Although the small path allowed them passage to the ships, it could force the royalist forces to bottleneck during a retreat while the long range guns of the ships protected them. San Martín studied the battlefield and readied the plan for the operation during the night, when the grenadiers were hidden inside the convent.

== Battle ==
The grenadiers left the convent at dawn, preparing their formations behind the convent. San Martín returned to the tower to watch the enemy who disembarked at sunrise, 5:30 in the morning. He mounted his horse, gave a short harangue to the troops, and headed to battle. His strategy was to divide his cavalry forces into two columns, of nearly sixty horsemen each, and make a surprise pincer movement to trap the enemy forces. The cavalry would not use their guns, relying instead on sabre and spear attacks. The right-hand column was headed by Justo German Bermúdez, and the left-hand one by San Martín. The royalists marched in two columns with the two cannons, a deployed flag and military drummers. The clarion of the Regiment of Mounted Grenadiers sounded for the first time, marking the beginning of the battle.

San Martín's column was the first one to reach the enemy. The two cannons and the cannon fire from the ships supported the royalists, but they were quickly outmanoeuvred by the sabre charges and, unable to form a square, had to retreat. The advantage of surprise and the speed of the cavalry charge allowed the regiment to defeat the larger royalist army who had almost double their number of soldiers. When Bermúdez and his column joined the battle the royalists were not able to stand their ground and were routed, retreating in disarray under covering fire from the ships. Bermúdez led the attack at this point as San Martín had fallen from his horse.

San Martín did not mention Escalada in his first battle report, initially leading historians to infer that they stayed within the convent during the battle. However it is currently considered that they took part in the battle, as suggested by the royalist battle report and a later report from San Martín which clarifies that only twelve grenadiers stayed in the convent.

The combat took around fifteen minutes and left forty royalists dead and many injured, including Zabala. Fourteen patriot grenadiers died in the combat and two more would die afterwards due to combat injuries. Manuel Díaz Vélez fell from his horse in the gully, was mortally injured and captured by the royalists. Bermúdez was shot in the patella and died a few days later. Hippolyte Bouchard captured the Spanish flag after killing the standard-bearer.

=== Cabral's intervention ===
José de San Martín, trapped under his dead horse during the battle, is saved by Juan Bautista Cabral

Despite the victory, the remaining royalist forces could not be pursued as the column led by Justo Bermúdez had moved further than calculated for. This delayed the meeting with San Martín's column whose horse was killed by enemy fire, leaving with his leg trapped under the corpse of the animal. These factors led to the columns not meeting up and allowed many royalists to escape. A royalist, probably Zabala himself, attempted to kill San Martín while he was trapped under his dead horse where he suffered a sabre injury to his face, and a bullet wound to his arm. Juan Bautista Cabral and Juan Bautista Baigorria intervened and saved San Martín's life. Cabral was mortally wounded during the rescue and San Martín reported that after Cabral was hit he said "I die happy, we have defeated the enemy". The exact moment this was said is unclear as the word after could have meant immediately after; during the ongoing battle; or some hours later during Cabral's agonising decline. San Martín wrote the battle report under a nearby tree. Fray Herminio Gaitán considers that Cabral's last words would have been in the Guaraní language, his first language, and that as San Martín also spoke Guaraní he would have translated them for the battle report.

Juan Bautista Cabral is commonly known as "Sergeant Cabral", but he was a private at the time of the battle. San Martín's report mentions him as "the grenadier Juan B. Cabral", and historians like Bartolomé Mitre, Herminio Gaitán, Gerardo Bra and Norberto Galasso support the idea. Mitre considers that Cabral was promoted posthumously, but there are no documents confirming that.

== Aftermath ==
Even though the Battle of San Lorenzo is acknowledged in Argentine historiography as an important battle for Argentine independence, it had little military influence in the conflict. Much of the recognition the battle generated is because San Martín fought in it, as the size of the forces involved and the length of the clash would normally mean it was considered a military engagement rather than a real battle and it did not influence the development of the Argentine War of Independence. This victory did nothing to prevent further raids from royalist ships as there were new raids at Tigre on 18 August 1813 and yet another one at San Fernando on 22 August. William Brown ended the royalist naval supremacy the following year.

San Martín did not take hostages or ask for ransoms, but rather he instructed his people to avoid further conflicts and to try to restore peaceful relations with the royalists. Zabala requested assistance for his wounded soldiers, which San Martín provided and he invited Zabala to share a large breakfast, which he accepted. San Martín was aware that the new enlightened ideas at stake in the Napoleonic Wars influenced many of the Spanish military, and expected to convince Zabala that absolutism was a bad cause to defend. He succeeded, as Zabala joined the patriot forces under San Martín's command during his administration in Mendoza.

José Gervasio Artigas, leader of the popular resistance at the Banda Oriental, sent an agent to San Lorenzo to congratulate San Martín for his victory. San Martín also met with John Parish Robertson, who informed Britain about the battle.

== Legacy ==
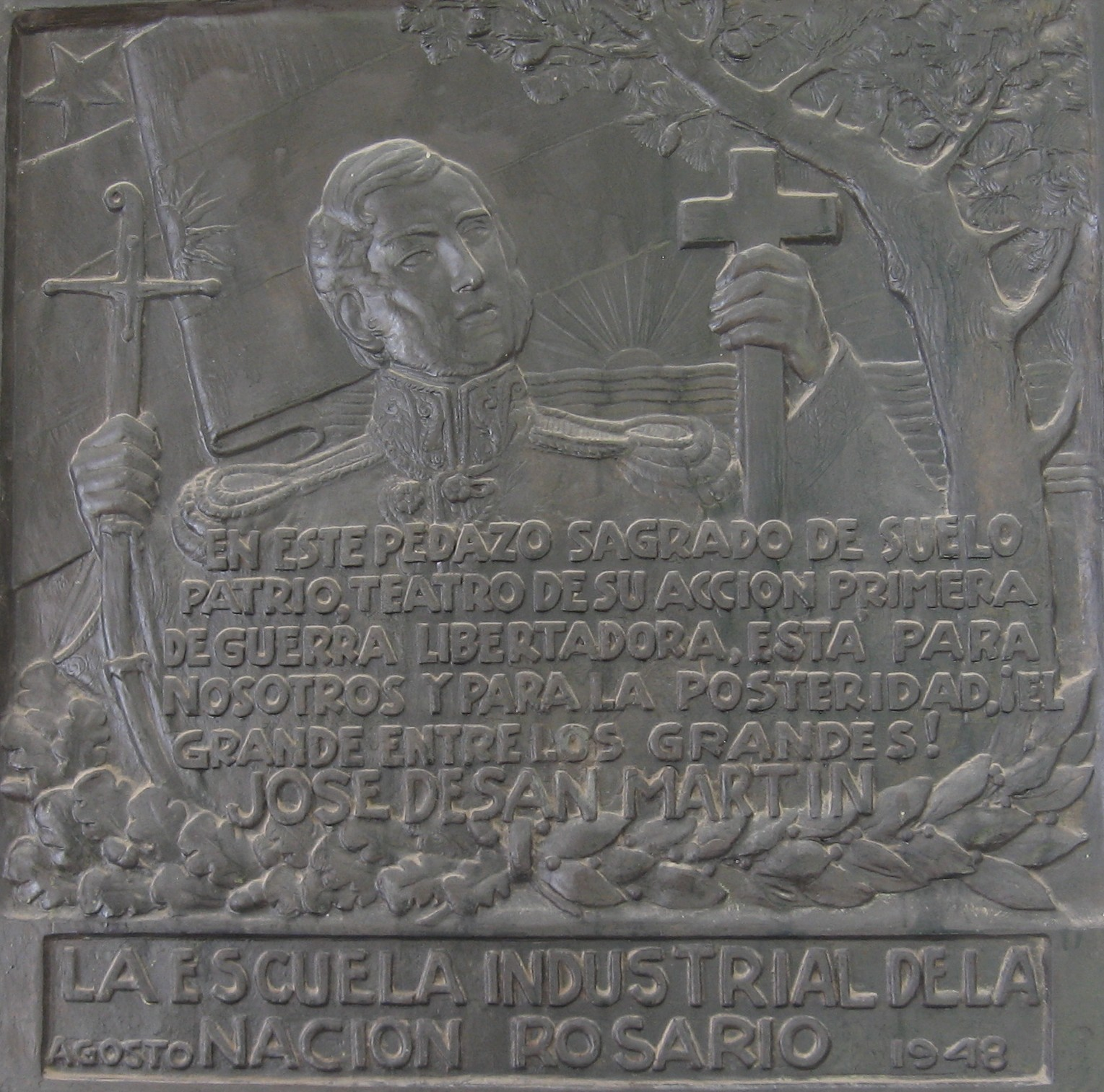
Plaque about the battle, at the San Carlos Convent

There are many Argentine memorials and places named after the battle, including three cities in Greater Rosario: Puerto General San Martín, Capitán Bermúdez and Granadero Baigorria are named after José de San Martín, Justo Germán Bermúdez and Juan Bautista Baigorria respectively, all of whom were involved in the battle. The Sargento Cabral Department at the Chaco Province is named after Juan Bautista Cabral, even though he was not a sergeant as described. The most popular homage to the battle is the name of the football club San Lorenzo de Almagro, named after both the battle and Saint Lawrence.

The city of San Lorenzo preserves the site of the battle and a dedicated historic complex. The San Carlos Convent is still a working convent, but has turned part of its buildings into a museum. It has retained San Martín's cell, the room used for medical treatment of the injured soldiers, urns of the dead soldiers and other related items to the "March of San Lorenzo" as well as the history of the convent. The mayor of San Lorenzo, made an agreement with the Argentine Armed Forces in 2008 that the Regiment of Mounted Grenadiers would have a permanent presence at the site.

The battlefield is known as the "Field of Glory", and it was turned into a park on 20 May 1913, by president Roque Sáenz Peña. There is a monument with two symbolic wings of victory, an eternal flame and nine memorials for the 16 patriot soldiers who died in the battle. The memorials are for the nine origins of those soldiers: the Argentine provinces of Corrientes, Santiago del Estero, La Rioja, Córdoba, San Luis and Buenos Aires, as well as Chile, France and Uruguay. Although Uruguay did not exist at the time of the battle, the Banda Oriental province is considered a predecessor of modern Uruguay.

The stone pine tree (Pinus pinea) under which San Martín wrote the battle report is known as the "Historic Pine", and has an estimated age of more than two hundred years. The convent, the battlefield and the Historic Pine were declared National Historic Monuments of Argentina on 24 September 1940 by law 12.648. The Historic Pine was declared a "Historic Tree" in 1946 by decree 3.038.

=== Songs ===
The Battle of San Lorenzo is the theme of the San Lorenzo march. The military march was composed in February 1901 by Cayetano Alberto Silva following a proposal from Representative Celestino Pera. It was first officially played on 30 October 1902 at the inauguration of the monument to General San Martín in Rosario. The lyrics were written by professor Carlos Javier Benielli in 1908. The march became famous in other countries and, according to the Argentine British Community Council, it has been considered in Europe to be one of the five best military marches ever written. The military bands of Uruguay, Brazil and Poland, amongst others, include it in their musical repertory.

The Battle of San Lorenzo was also mentioned as an Argentine victory in the first Argentine National Anthem, along with the battles of San José, Suipacha, Las Piedras, Salta and Tucumán. There is also a brief reference to the battle in the march Mi bandera ("My flag"), which honors the flag of Argentina. However, the march includes a historical inaccuracy: "Here is the flag that one day in triumph rose over the battlefield and, full of pride and gallantry, to San Lorenzo led, inmortal." That is incorrect as the current flag of Argentina was not widely used until 1814 or 1815. The Battle of Salta was the only conflict of the Argentine War of Independence fought in current Argentine territory under the modern flag of Argentina. The San Martín National Institute states, by oral tradition, that the grenadiers of San Lorenzo did not use any flag for the operation.

== Bibliography ==
- Camogli, Pablo; Privitellio, Luciano de (2005). Batallas por la Libertad (in Spanish). Buenos Aires: Aguilar. ISBN 987-04-0105-8.
- Galasso, Norberto (2009). Seamos Libres y lo demás no importa nada (in Spanish). Buenos Aires: Colihue. ISBN 978-950-581-779-5.
- Mitre, Bartolomé (1952). Historia de San Martín y de la emancipación sudamericana (in Spanish). Buenos Aires: Peuser.
