= Juan Bautista Cabral =

Argentinian soldier (1789–1813)

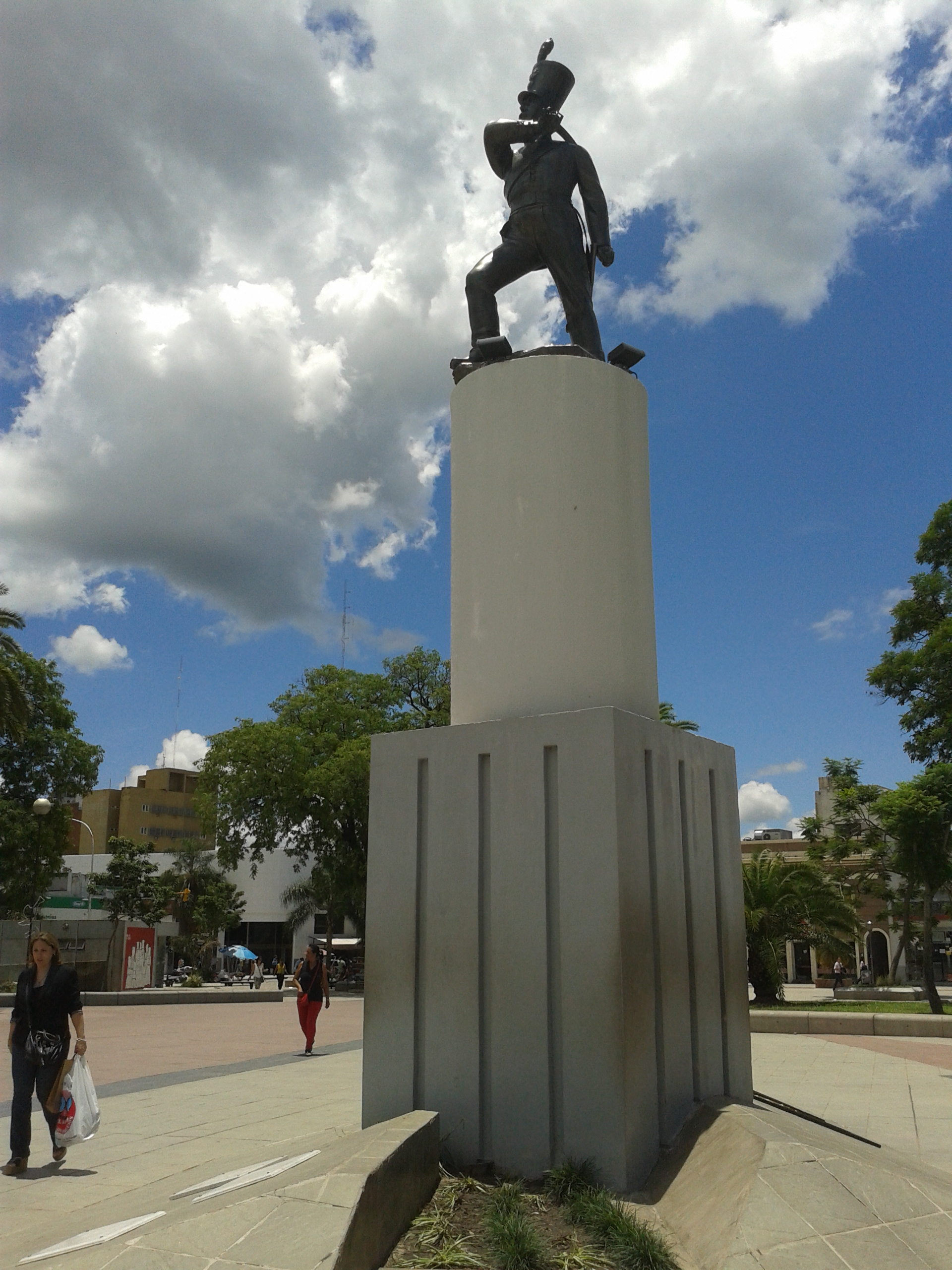
- Monument to Sergeant Juan Bautista Cabral in Corrientes
- Born: 24 June 1789; Saladas, Corrientes
- Died: 3 February 1813 (aged 23); San Carlos Convent, San Lorenzo
- Burial place: San Carlos Convent
- Military career
- Allegiance: Argentina
- Branch: Argentine Army
- Service years: 1790—1813
- Rank: Sergeant (posthumous)
- Nickname: Soldado Heroico (Heroic Soldier)
- Unit: Regiment of Mounted Grenadiers
- Conflicts: Argentine War of Independence; Battle of San Lorenzo

Juan Bautista Cabral (24 June 1789 – 3 February 1813) was an Argentine soldier, of Zambo origin, of the Regiment of Mounted Grenadiers who died in the Battle of San Lorenzo, while he was aiding then Colonel Don José de San Martín, whose horse had fallen to enemy fire. The action of Cabral in this first military confrontation of the Argentine War of Independence gave him lasting fame and a prominent place among Argentine patriots.

== Biography ==
Little is known about the life of Cabral. It is estimated that he was born in the town which now bears his name in the city of Saladas, Corrientes. He joined the second squadron of the newly formed Granaderos Cavalry Regiment in 1812. According to Pastor Obligado, Cabral's diligence and leadership led to corporal's stripes in December of the same year, and to promotion to sergeant the next year. Contrary to this assertion, Bartolomé Mitre (in his Historia de San Martín y de la Emancipación Americana) states that he was a private ("soldado raso") on the date of the battle.

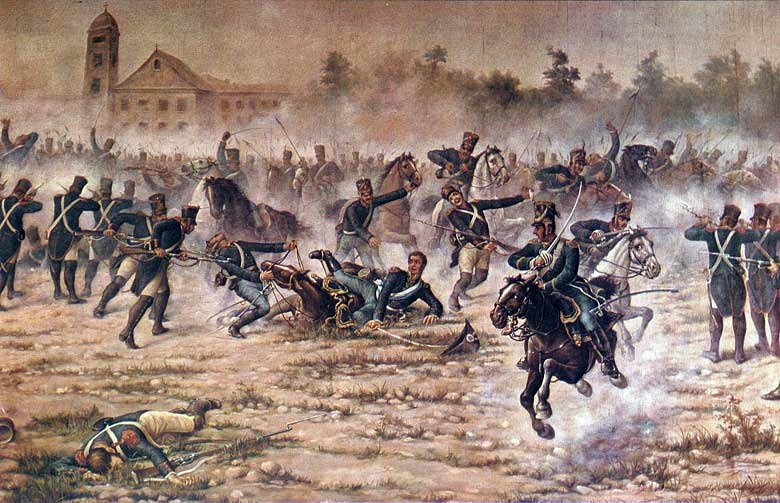
Scene of the Battle of San Lorenzo.

Regardless of his rank, his action took place right after the battle started. The royalist forces (loyal to the Spanish Crown) had sailed up the Paraná River from Montevideo and landed on San Lorenzo, Santa Fe. Enemy fire overturned San Martín's horse, trapping the colonel beneath it, while the royalists drew close charging with bayonets. Cabral dismounted and assisted San Martín. The exact details have been embellished to the point that it is impossible to say how much risk he took. Some versions have Cabral placing himself between the bayonets and San Martín, which is doubtful. In any event, Cabral was critically wounded, and he died in the refectory of the neighboring San Carlos Convent, which was used as a field hospital. On his deathbed he said "I die happy, General; we have beaten the enemy."

== Legacy ==
According to Mitre, the rank of sergeant was given him posthumously due to meritorious actions in the battle. Argentine history has made him a national hero, and there are many monuments erected in his honor. The San Lorenzo march, by C. J. Benielli, is dedicated to him, and is taught in primary school. The famous Paraguayan composer and guitar virtuoso Agustin Barrios Mangoré composed a piece dedicated to the memory of him called Sargento Cabral. The Argentine Army's school for NCOs is named in his honour.

Cabral's heroic deeds have also been reflected in music and culture. A tango by Manuel Campoamor bears his name, as does a chamamé.

== See also ==
- Juan Bautista Baigorria
