= Juan Bautista Baigorria =

Argentine 19th century cavalry soldier

- Born: 1764? San Luis Province, Argentina
- Died: 1860?
- Military career
- Allegiance: Argentina
- Branch: Army
- Rank: Soldier
- Conflicts: Battle of San Lorenzo

Juan Bautista Baigorria, also known as Granadero Baigorria, (San Luis Province ca. 1764 - Bañado de Pajas, Cordoba Province, ca. 1860), was an Argentine soldier. He became famous for having saved his commander when he stopped a royalist from bayonnetting then-colonel José de San Martín.

== Military career ==
Baigorria was part of the 1st company of Regiment of Mounted Grenadiers. He took part of the Battle of San Lorenzo, on 3 February 1813. When a royalist soldier tried to kill his commanding officer, then-colonel San Martín, who had a leg pinned under his fallen horse, Baigorria killed the enemy with his lance. San Martín's horse had been wounded and felled by a royalist who shot the animal, which then caught the colonel on his leg. This action by Baigorria allowed Private Juan Bautista Cabral to help the colonel and save his life. Cabral later died of wounds and, along with Baigorria, is remembered as a hero by the Argentine historiography.

The town of Granadero Baigorria in Santa Fe Province, is named after him.
