= San Carlos Convent =

Coordinates: 32°44′45″S 60°43′53″W

- Convento San Carlos (Spanish)
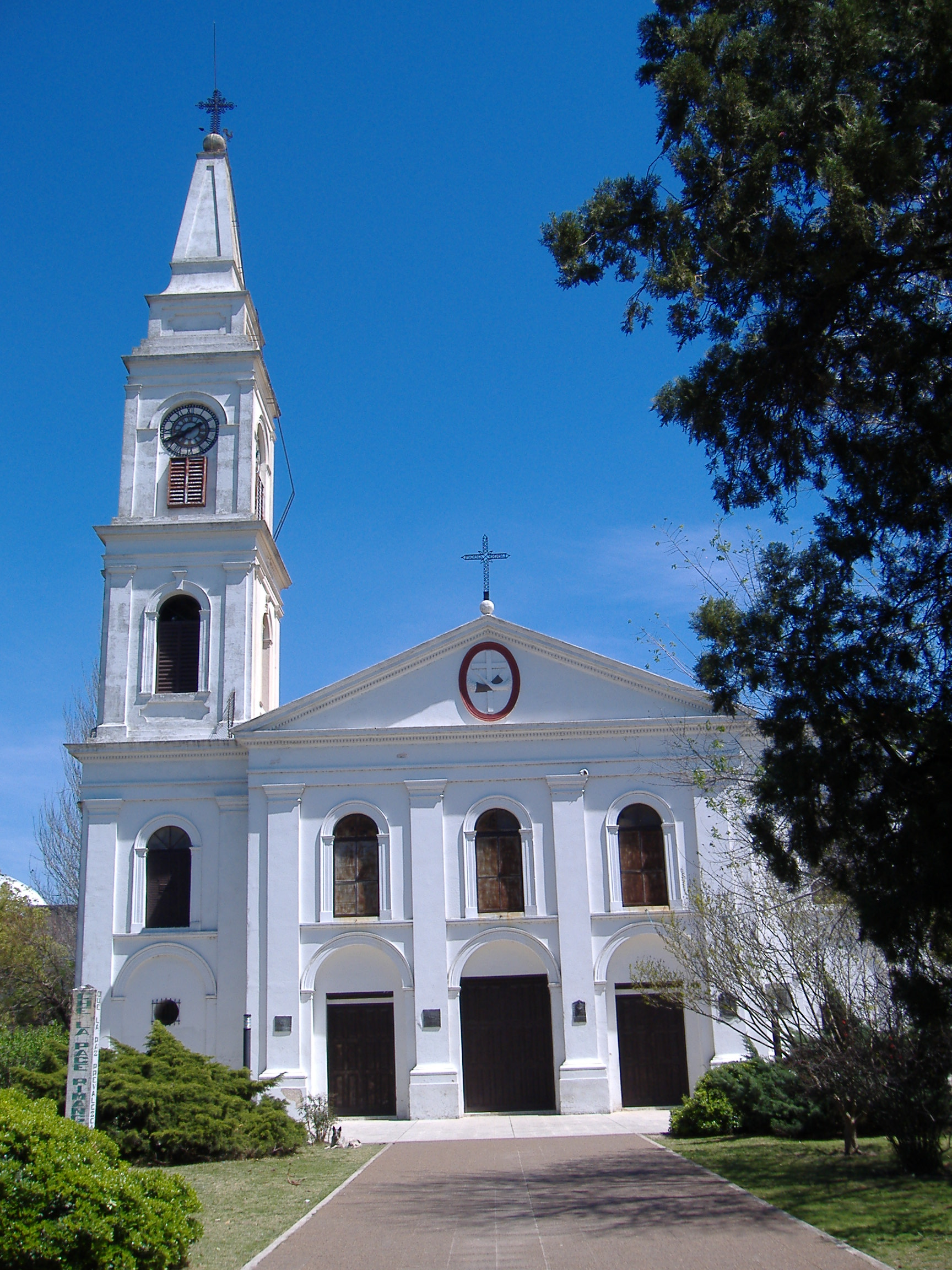

- Location within Argentina
- Location: San Lorenzo, Argentina

History
- Built: 1790
- Built for: Franciscan friars

National Historic Monument of Argentina

The San Carlos Convent is located in San Lorenzo, Santa Fe, in Argentina. The battle of San Lorenzo was fought next to it, and both the convent itself and the battlefield are National Historic Monuments of Argentina.

== History ==
When the Jesuits were removed from the Viceroyalty of the Río de la Plata, the Franciscan friars moved to the chapel at San Miguel del Carcarañal. In 1790 they sought to establish another one more distant from the Parana river, and governor Félix Aldao gave them the current location. In that year they built the chapel, a well, a house for the monk appointed to it and a shed for the laborers. The shed was expanded in 1792, and the chapel was fenced. The friars finally moved to it in 1796.

Manuel Belgrano visited it in 1811, in his return from the Paraguay campaign, and the chapel helped him the following year to build the "Independencia" and "Libertad" batteries at modern Rosario. José de San Martín followed a royalist ship navigating the Parana, and hid his troops inside the convent. The ship landed near the chapel, attempting to pillage it, but San Martín made a surprise attack and defeated them at the Battle of San Lorenzo. The chapel was used after the battle to give medical treatment to the injured soldiers. The chapel was also the site where Belgrano, Estanislao López and Francisco Ramírez signed an armistice in 1819.

The convent was declared National Monument on October 2, 1940, by law 12.648. Raimundo, mayor of San Lorenzo, made an agreement in 2008 with the Argentine Armed Forces so that the Regiment of Mounted Grenadiers have a permanent presence in the site. The chapel works as a museum of the battle as well.

== See also ==
- Battle of San Lorenzo
