= Granadero Baigorria =

- City
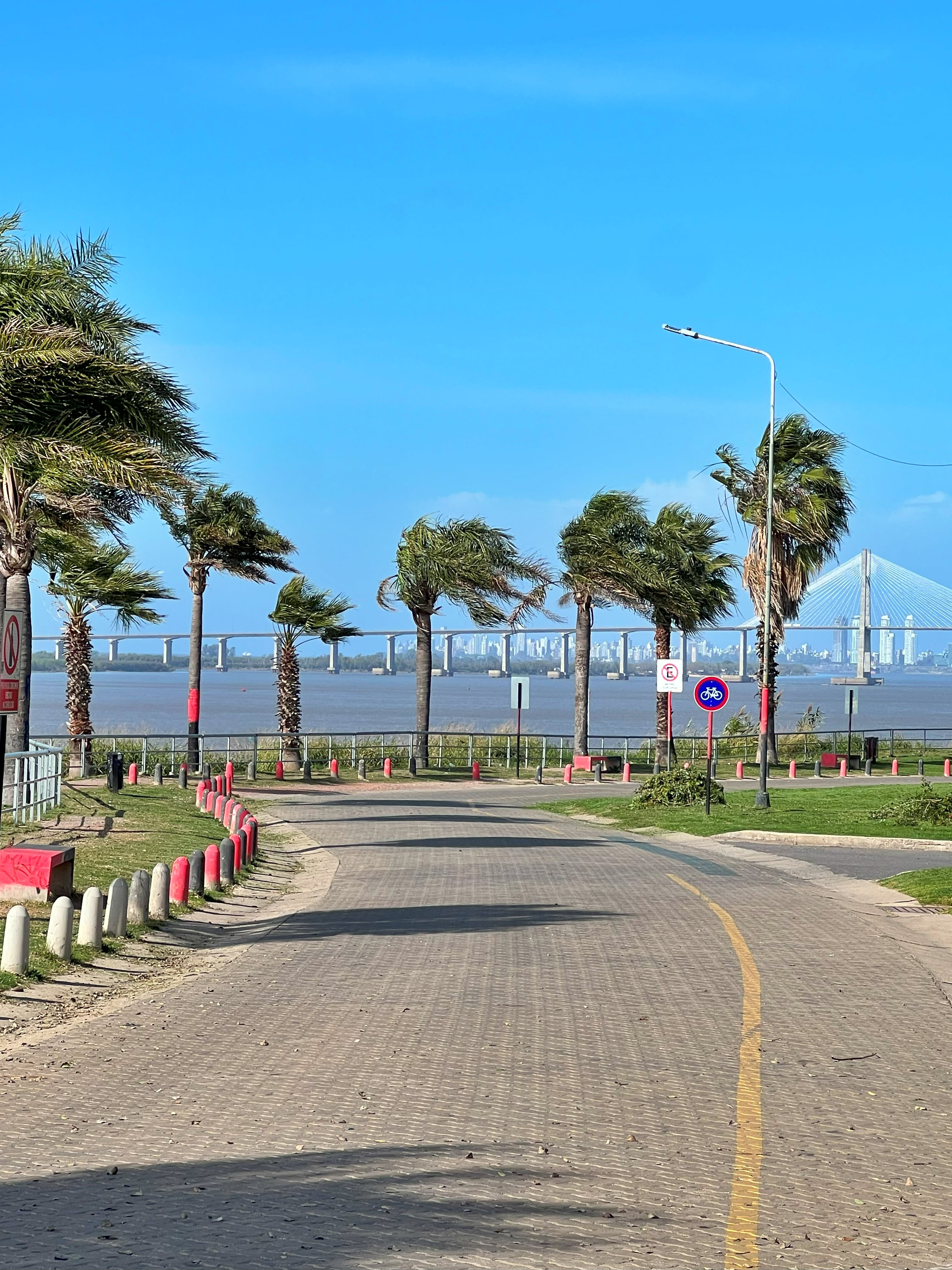

- Location of Granadero Baigorria in Argentina
- Coordinates: 32°51′S 60°42′W
- Country: Argentina
- Province: Santa Fe
- Department: Rosario

Government
  - Intendant: Adrián Maglia (Justicialist Party)

Area
  - Total: 12 km^{2} (4.6 sq mi)

Population (2015)
  - Total: 43,000
  - Density: 3,600/km^{2} (9,300/sq mi)
- Demonym: baigorriense
- Time zone: UTC−3 (ART)
- Dialing code: +54 341

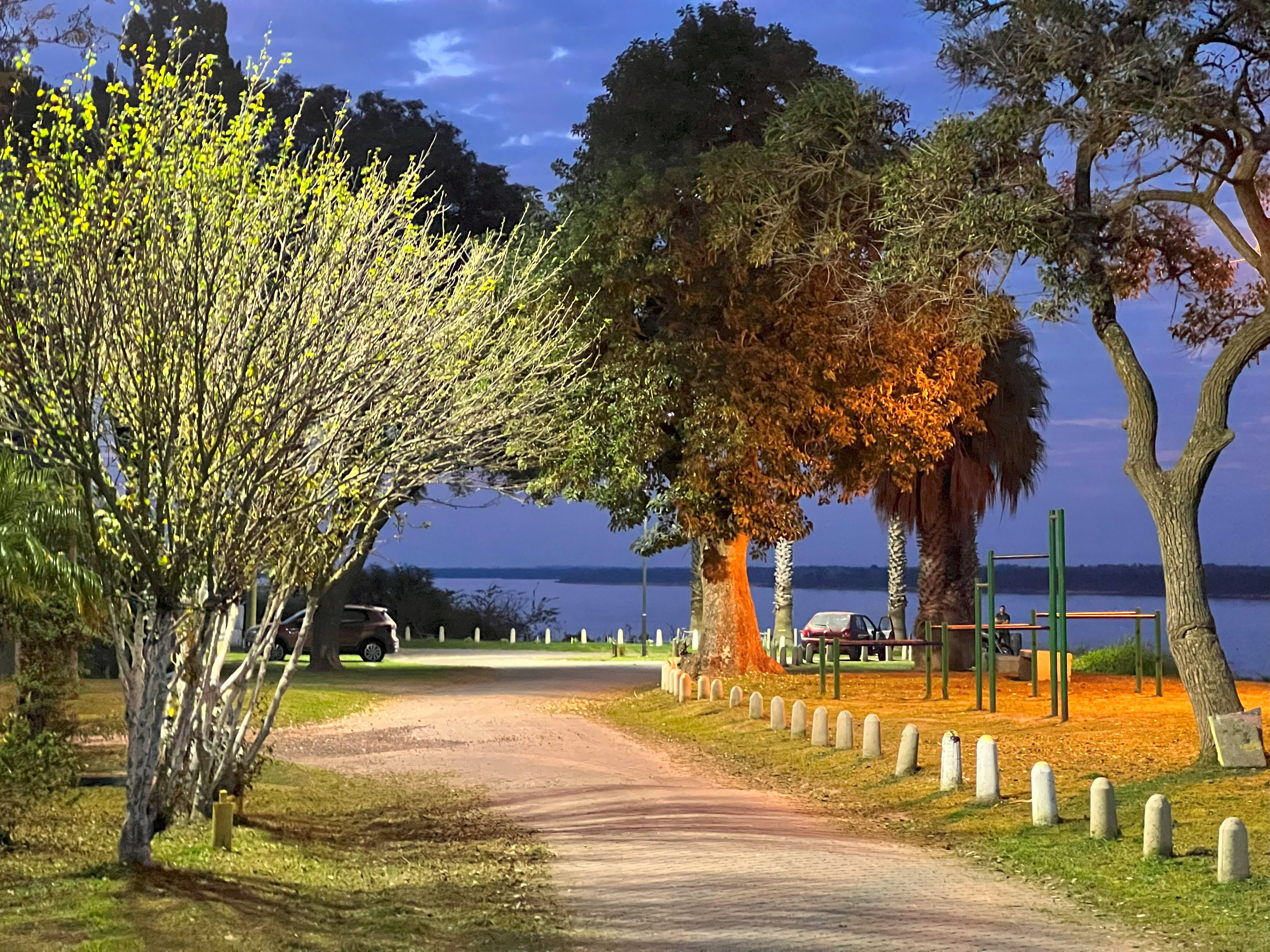
Parana River from Granadero Baigorria waterfront

Granadero Baigorria is a city in the south of the province of Santa Fe, Argentina, located directly north of Rosario, on the western shore of the Paraná River, and forming part of the Greater Rosario metropolitan area. Its population is about 43,000 inhabitants (2015).

Granadero Baigorria is named after Juan Bautista Baigorria, a cavalry soldier of the Mounted Grenadiers (Granaderos a Caballo) who fought for General José de San Martín in the battle of San Lorenzo on 3 February 1813, the first of the Argentine War of Independence.

== Features ==
The city features a camping site, beaches, and several islands on the Paraná. Cultural spotlights include an Artisans' Square, a museum, and several churches and shrines. Granadero Baigorria is also home to the first Portland cement factory in Argentina.

Granadero Baigorria
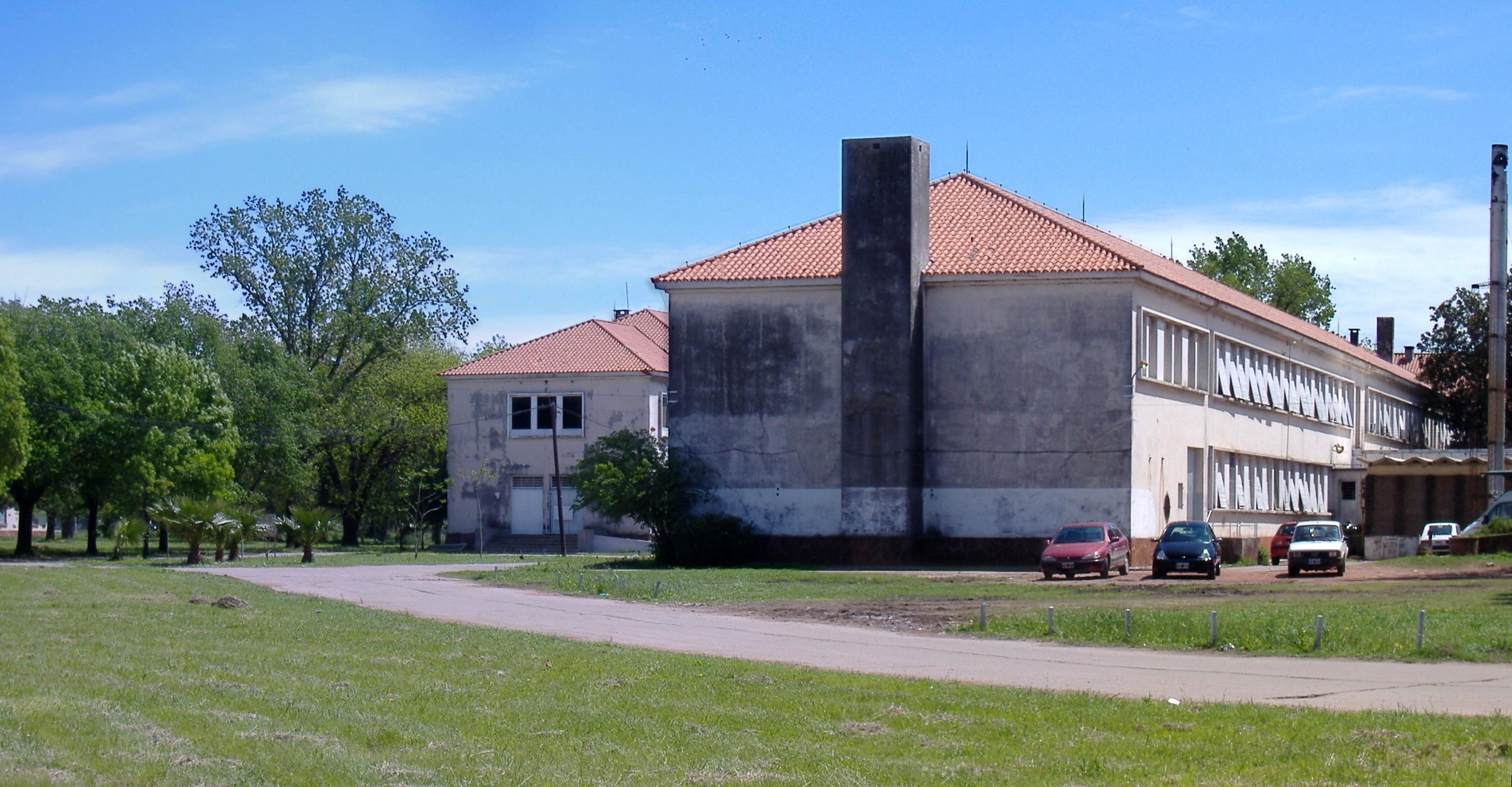
- Facilities of the Eva Perón Hospital

Geography
- Location: Granadero Baigorria, Santa Fe Province, Argentina

Services
- Beds: 137

Links
- Lists: Hospitals in Argentina

The city has a 137-bed public (provincial) hospital, Hospital Escuela Eva Perón, which together with two other hospitals and nine primary care healthcare centers, in the Rosario metropolitan area supply medical services. It is located on 1645 San Martín Avenue. The name of the hospital is an homage to Eva Perón, the renowned First Lady of Argentina in the mid-20th century and an icon of Peronism.

The city has many important producers of tractors and combine harvesters like John Deere and Marani-Agrinar (formerly known as Massey Ferguson since 1969 to 2002 and previously the Hanomag-Cura). Liliana, one of Argentina's largest home appliances manufacturers, has its main production site in Granadero Baigorria.

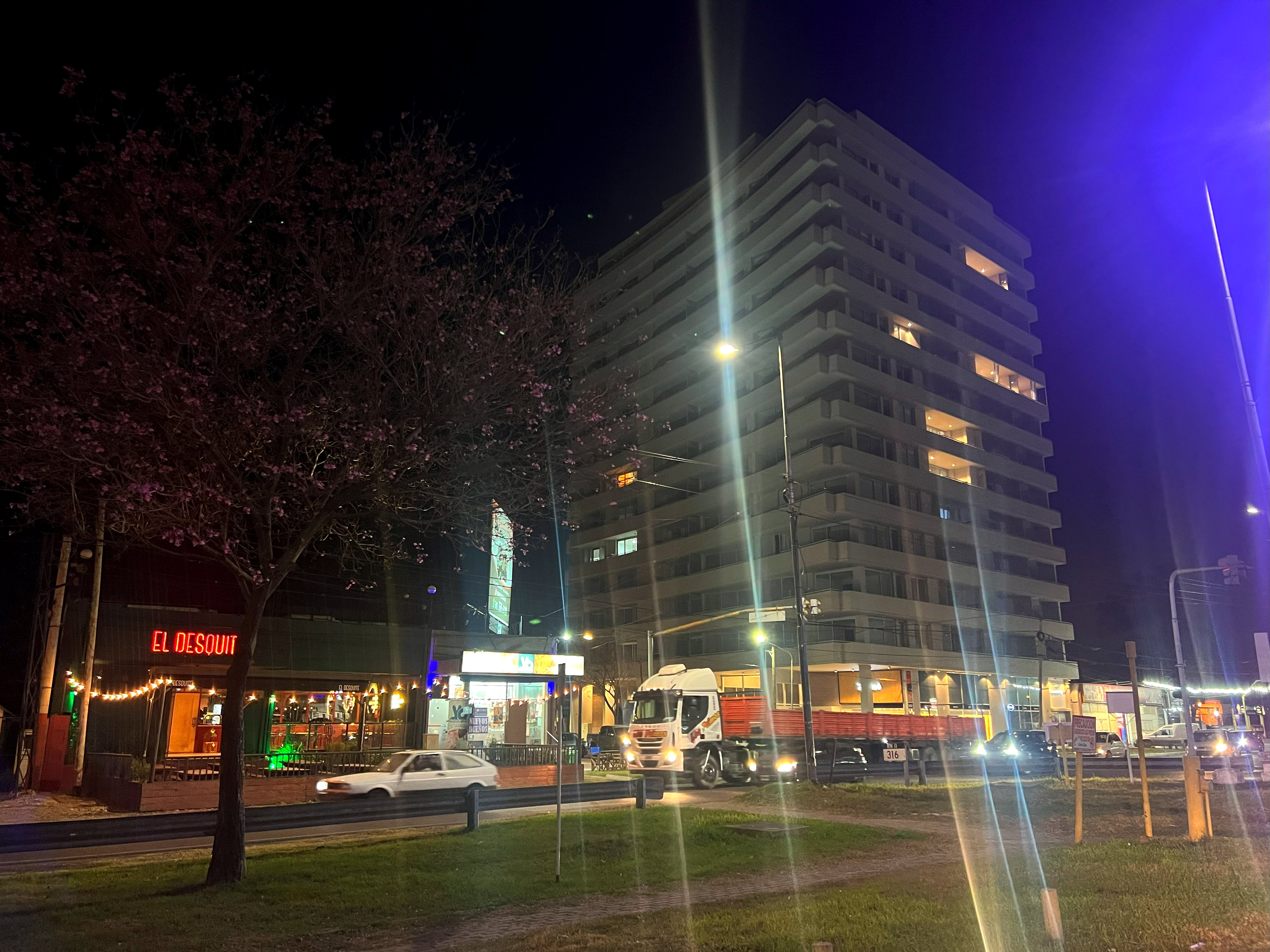
San Martin Avenue, main commercial district of Granadero Baigorria.

== Industry ==
The locality is home to several well-known, mainly metal-mechanical and long-established companies such as the American John Deere, Marani-Agrinar of the Taselli group of companies (which was first Hanomag-Cura until 1969 and from there until 2002 Massey-Ferguson) and Argental, a manufacturer of bakery machinery.
