= Mounted Grenadiers Regiment =

Argentine Army military units

Regiment of Mounted Grenadiers General San Martín
- Regimiento de Granaderos a Caballo; General San Martín
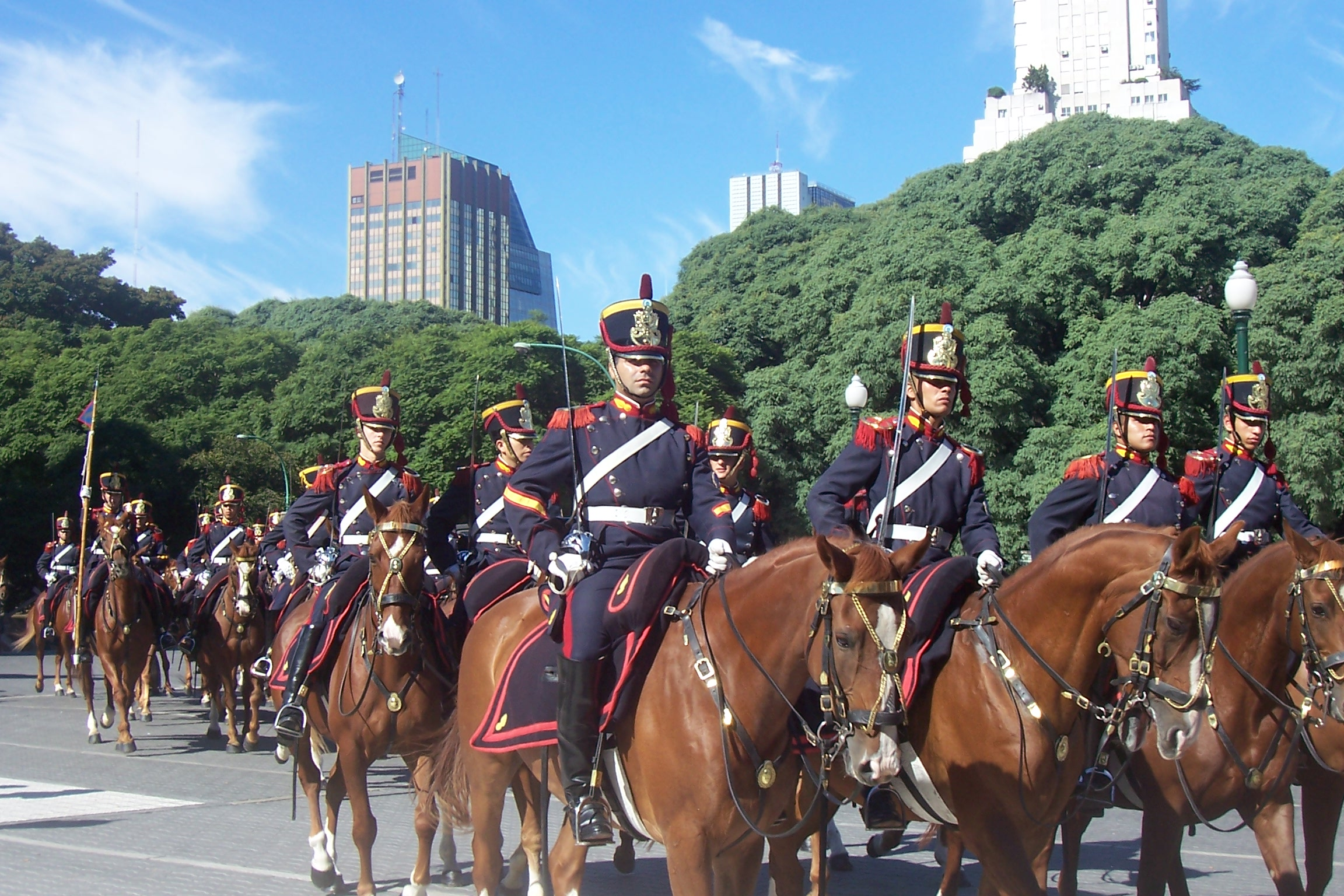
- The regiment at Plaza San Martín, 2006
- Active: 16 March 1812 – 1826; 25 May 1903–present
- Disbanded: 1826 (reinstituted in 1903)
- Country: Argentina
- Branch: Argentine Army
- Type: Cavalry
- Role: Honor guard
- Garrison/HQ: Palermo, Buenos Aires
- Nickname: Granaderos
- Patron: José de San Martín
- Colors: (navy, red, white)
- March: San Lorenzo march
- Anniversaries: March 16 (creation); February 3 (baptism of fire)
- Engagements: Chilean war of independence; Argentine War of Independence; Battle of San Lorenzo; Peruvian War of Independence; Cisplatine War; Bombing of Plaza de Mayo; Falklands War; Battle of Mount Harriet

Commanders
- Current commander: Coronel Rodrigo Carlos Berra.
- Notable commanders: José de San Martín

Insignia
- Identification symbol

The Regiment of Mounted Grenadiers "General San Martín" (Spanish: Regimiento de Granaderos a Caballo "General San Martín") is the name of two Argentine Army regiments of two different time periods: a historic regiment that operated from 1812 to 1826, and a modern cavalry unit that was organized in 1903.

The first Regiment of Mounted Grenadiers, formed in 1812, fought in the Argentine War of Independence under José de San Martín, and the Cisplatine War, subsequently becoming the Presidential bodyguard in 1825. Refusing to replenish its membership with soldiers who had not fought in the Argentine War of Independence, the regiment disbanded in 1826.

The second Regiment of Mounted Grenadiers was formed on May 25, 1903, by then President of Argentina Julio Argentino Roca, and serves as the national ceremonial unit. It claims the original regiment of 1812 as its heritage, but has no direct link or lineage. This incarnation of the regiment is also known as the General Jose de San Martin Cavalry Regiment. As a unit, it has never been in combat, although ten members of the regiment were seconded to other units which fought in the Islas Malvinas, as well as six machine gun detachments being attached to the 1st Infantry Regiment Los Patricios during that conflict.

== The original Mounted Grenadiers of 1812–1826 ==
The original regiment was founded by Argentine national hero José de San Martín in 1812. Its first military action was the Battle of San Lorenzo (1813). The regiment also played a key role as part of the Army of the Andes (Ejército de los Andes) in the battles of Chacabuco (1817) and Maipú (1818) in Chile. Traveling to Perú, Ecuador, and Bolivia, the Grenadiers took part in the Battles of Riobamba, Pichincha (1822) and Ayacucho (1824), and in the Cisplatine War. The size of the regiment fell to 120 men and it was disbanded in 1827.

=== Raising of the Regiment ===
When then Lt. Col. of Cavalry Jose de San Martin arrived on March 9, 1812, the First Triumvirate recognized him for his services as a Cavalry officer in the Spanish Army. After studying the Argentine Army's organizational and strategic problems, he offered to put his experiences from the Peninsular War to use in assisting with the Argentine War for Independence.

On March 12, the Superior Provisional Government gave an order that recognized and confirmed San Martin's services. The Triumvirate had written to the government asking that San Martin be appointed commander of the Mounted Grenadiers Squadron, which was about to be raised. San Martin set out to form a new cavalry corps that would be patterned after the Swiss Army's Mounted Grenadiers. His goal was to create a unit made up of native soldiers trained in cavalry tactics and mounted combat skills that could effectively support the Argentine Army. Over the next several months, he built what became known as the "Mounted Grenadiers Squadron".

=== Composition of the Horse Grenadiers Squadron (June 1812) ===
The new unit was led by two commanders and eight officers of cavalry. Non-commissioned officers and enlisted troops numbered nine cavalry sergeants, three cavalry corporals, 31 cavalry grenadiers and one cavalry trumpeter.

Officers and commanders of the Squadron

- Squadron Commander: Lieutenant Colonel Jose de San Martin
- Squadron Corporal Major: Carlos Maria de Alvear
- Adjutant Major: Francisco Luzuriaga
- Guidon Bearer: Manuel Hidalgo

1st Cavalry Troop officers

- Cavalry Captain Jose Matias Zapiola
- Cavalry Lieutenant Justo Bermudez
- Cornet Hipolito Bouchard

2nd Cavalry Troop officers

- Cavalry Captain Pedro Vergara
- Cavalry Lieutenant Agenor Murillio
- Cornet Mariano Necochea

=== Organization and recruiting ===
The strict training regimen and rules of conduct established by Jose de San Martin for the Mounted Grenadiers Regiment became a model for the Argentine Army. Rigorous military discipline, especially in maneuvers, training and parade drills were a defining characteristic of the regiment. The San Martin Code of Honor, still used today by the regiment, set out the rules expected to be followed by each member of the Mounted Grenadiers. San Martin used the Code of Honor in recruiting, training, and leading what became an effective fighting force.

Based on the concept of "leading by example", in private life as well as military life, the Regiment's Code of Honor included discipline, courage, and a commitment to training. The Code incorporated fourteen specific points, which stated that it was unbecoming of an officer in the regiment:

1. To show cowardice in battle. Even lowering one's head will be considered as such.
2. To not accept a challenge, whether it is just or unjust.
3. To not demand satisfaction when he has been insulted.
4. To not defend, at all costs, the honor of his unit when it has been defamed in his presence or elsewhere.
5. To cheat like a tradesman.
6. To lack integrity in the management of his unit's interests; such as not paying his troops the money that has been provided for them.
7. To speak ill of his comrades to soldiers or officers from other military units.
8. To publicize the discussions held by the officers in their secret meetings.
9. To fraternize with sergeants, corporals and troopers.
10. To lay hands on a woman, even if she has insulted him.
11. To not come to the relief of a comrade who is in danger, when he is able.
12. To be seen in public with women who are known prostitutes.
13. To gamble with low and bawdy people outside of the officer corps.
14. To drink immoderately, in a way that would be prejudicial to the honor of his unit.

Sometime later, San Martín wrote a short poem honoring his Grenadiers:

De lo que mis Granaderos son capaces,
solo lo sé yo.
Quien los iguale habrá;
quien los exceda, no.

Translation:

Of what my Grenadiers are capable,
Only I know.
Who can equal them there will be;
Who can exceed them, not.

=== Development from squadron to regiment ===
After a period of recruitment and training, the Second Mounted Grenadiers Squadron was decreed as ready on September 11, 1812, and the Third Mounted Grenadiers Squadron followed in December 1812. By this time, the First Triumvirate had been disbanded as a result of the Revolution of October 8, 1812, which had been supported by the Second Squadron.

San Martin was given the title of Commander of the Mounted Grenadiers. When the "Mounted Grenadiers Regiment" officially came into existence on December 7, 1812, San Martin was promoted to colonel and the unit relocated to improved quarters and better stables. Its Fourth Squadron was raised three years later, in 1815.

=== Baptism by fire: the Battle of San Lorenzo (February 3, 1813) ===
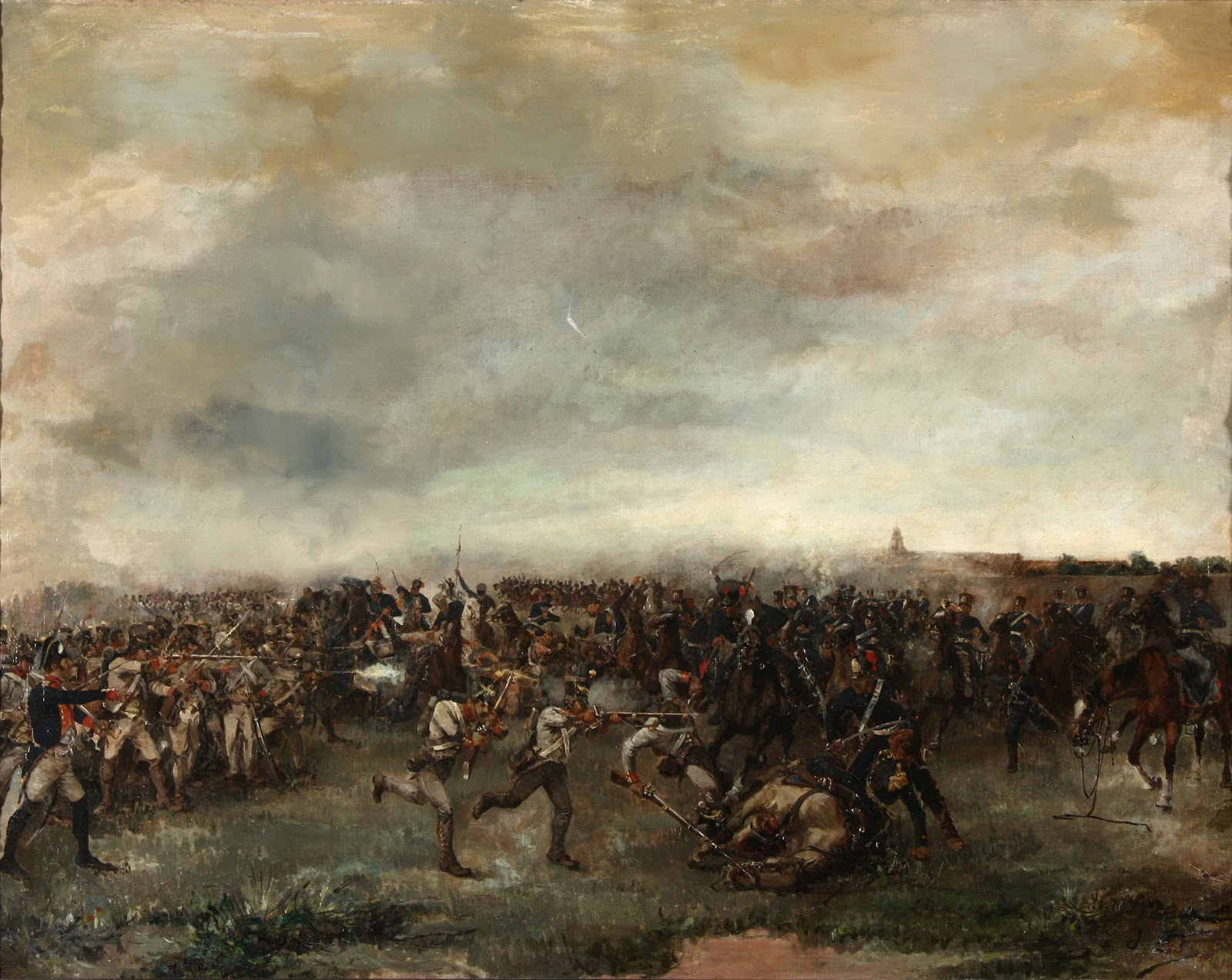
The Battle of San Lorenzo, painting by Julio Fernánez Villanueva

On February 3, 1813, the regiment won the only battle of the Argentine War of Independence led by San Martin. The regiment had proceeded to the town of San Lorenzo in Santa Fe on the previous day to stop an advance landing party of 250 Spanish troops from marching on the capital. The regiment was joined by a militia company led by Celedonio Escalada. Setting up camp at a convent in the town, they remained overnight.

At dawn the next day, the regiment assembled in front of the convent. San Martin mounted, addressed the troops, and ordered his squadrons to set off in two 60-man columns. San Martin led one column; Captain Justo Bermudez, from Uruguay, led the other. The 12 remaining men from the regiment formed a reserve platoon.

San Martin's troops charged the Spanish battalion, followed by Bermudez bringing up a second charge. San Martin fell from his horse after it was wounded, but was rescued by Juan Bautista Cabral and Juan Bautista Baigorria, two men from his regiment. Cabral was mortally wounded in the process and San Martín reported that Cabral's dying words (in Guarani) were: "I die happy, we have defeated the enemy". Moments later, Lieutenant Bouchard killed the Spanish flag bearer, completing the rout of the Spanish forces.

The battle lasted only 15 minutes, but left 40 Spanish dead and 16 wounded or captured, and 16 Argentine dead and 22 wounded. The Argentine force also seized two cannons.

San Martin ensured that the Spanish wounded and captured were treated humanely. After having breakfast with the Spanish commander, Antonio Zabala, on February 4, San Martin persuaded the Spanish force to defect to the Argentine cause. On his return, San Martin was congratulated by Eastern Bank independence leader José Gervasio Artigas on his first victory.

The Second Triumvirate promoted San Martin to General and gave him command of the Buenos Aires garrison forces.

=== Eastern Bank and the Army of the North ===
The next assignment for the regiment was defense duties in an area that is modern day Montevideo, Uruguay along with supporting the Army of the North. The First and Second Squadrons joined the Argentine army in Tucuman in January 1814, remaining in northern Upper Peru until 1816, while the Third and Fourth Squadrons were involved in the campaign of liberation in the Banda Oriental, becoming part of the forces that took the city in June 1814.

In their performance in the battles for Upper Peru, the 1st and 2nd Squadrons witnessed the events of the Yatasto relay within days after their arrival.

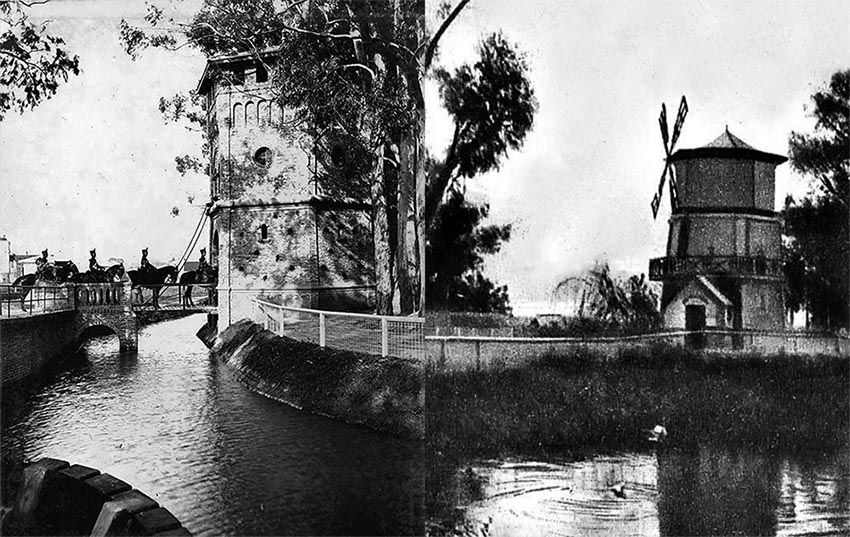
Mounted Grenadiers crossing a bridge in Saavedra, Buenos Aires, c. 1900s

On August that same year, 1814, San Martin assumed the office of provincial governor of Cuyo Province fronting the Chilean border, and the Regiment set up its new home in the province the next year with the 3rd and 4th Squadrons moving there, followed in the next year by the 1st and 2nd Squadrons. Assisted by now Lieutenant Colonel Mariano Necochea, the regiment prepared itself for the liberation of Chile from Spanish rule and thus, together with the newly formed mounted rifle squadron with Necochea as its commanding officer, raised with 300 Horse Grenadiers, formed part of the Army of the Andes with San Martin himself as its commanding general. It rode towards the Chilean border as part of the Crossing of the Andes in the late summer of 1817, and upon reaching Chile, fought bravely in the Battle of Chacabuco in February, later distinguishing themselves the following year in the Second Battle of Cancha Rayada and the Battle of Maipú. The regiment, thus, was witness to the Chilean Declaration of Independence in Santiago on 12 February 1818, one year after the victory in the Chacabuco fields.

== The Mounted Grenadiers of 1903–today ==
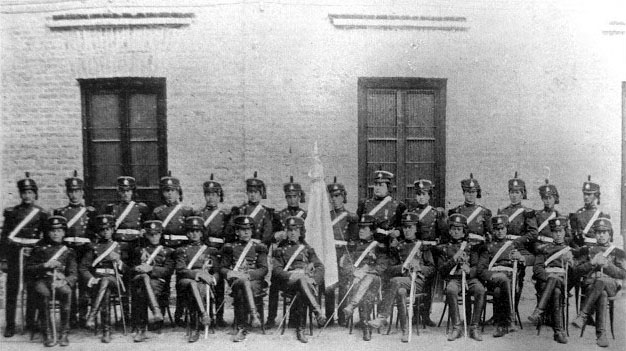
Mounted Grenadiers in Mendoza, 1910

On May 25, 1903, the Regiment was reinstated after President of Argentina Julio Argentino Roca signed a decree that recognised the Mounted Grenadies as a "permanent unit of the Army", also stating they would wear "the historic uniform of the Regiment that had fought in the Wars of Independence". Three years later, Roca's successor, José Figueroa Alcorta, assigned the Grenadiers the role of "presidential escort, protocol and security".

The unit itself has never seen combat ever since, although during the Malvinas War eight conscripts and two first corporals from the regiment were seconded to units in the Malvinas and two were wounded in combat. An adhoc troop from the regiment, originally planned for deployment, was placed on reserve in the mainland. Six machine gun detachments did see service in the Malvinas, being attached to the 1st Infantry Regiment.

=== Role ===
At present, the regiment acts as the Presidential Honor Guard regiment and fulfills ceremonial protocol functions. It is the caretaker of the Casa Rosada, the Argentine Presidential Palace at the eastern end of the famous Plaza de Mayo. The regiment also takes on ceremonial and security duties at the various residences of the President of Argentina nationwide.

The Regiment also mounts guard at the Buenos Aires Metropolitan Cathedral, where its founder's remains are buried, and at the Palace of the Argentine National Congress.

=== In popular culture ===
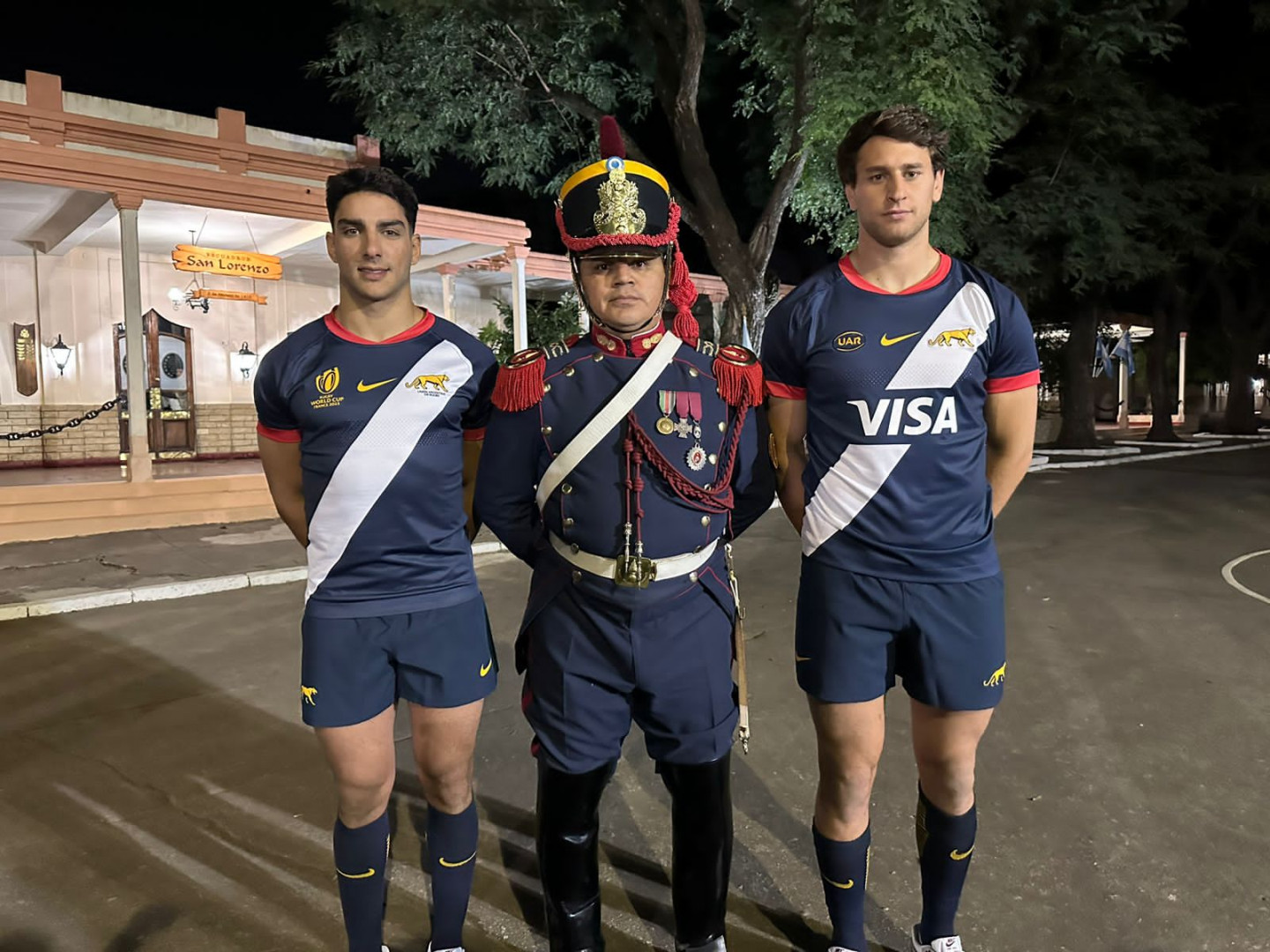
Players of Los Pumas and a grenadier posing with the away uniform for the 2023 World Cup

In June 2023, the Argentine Rugby Union released an away kit for the Argentina national rugby union team (mostly known as Los Pumas) which was inspired by the uniform of the Mounted Grenadiers Regiment. The away kit was worn at the 2023 Rugby World Cup.

== Structure ==
=== Organization ===
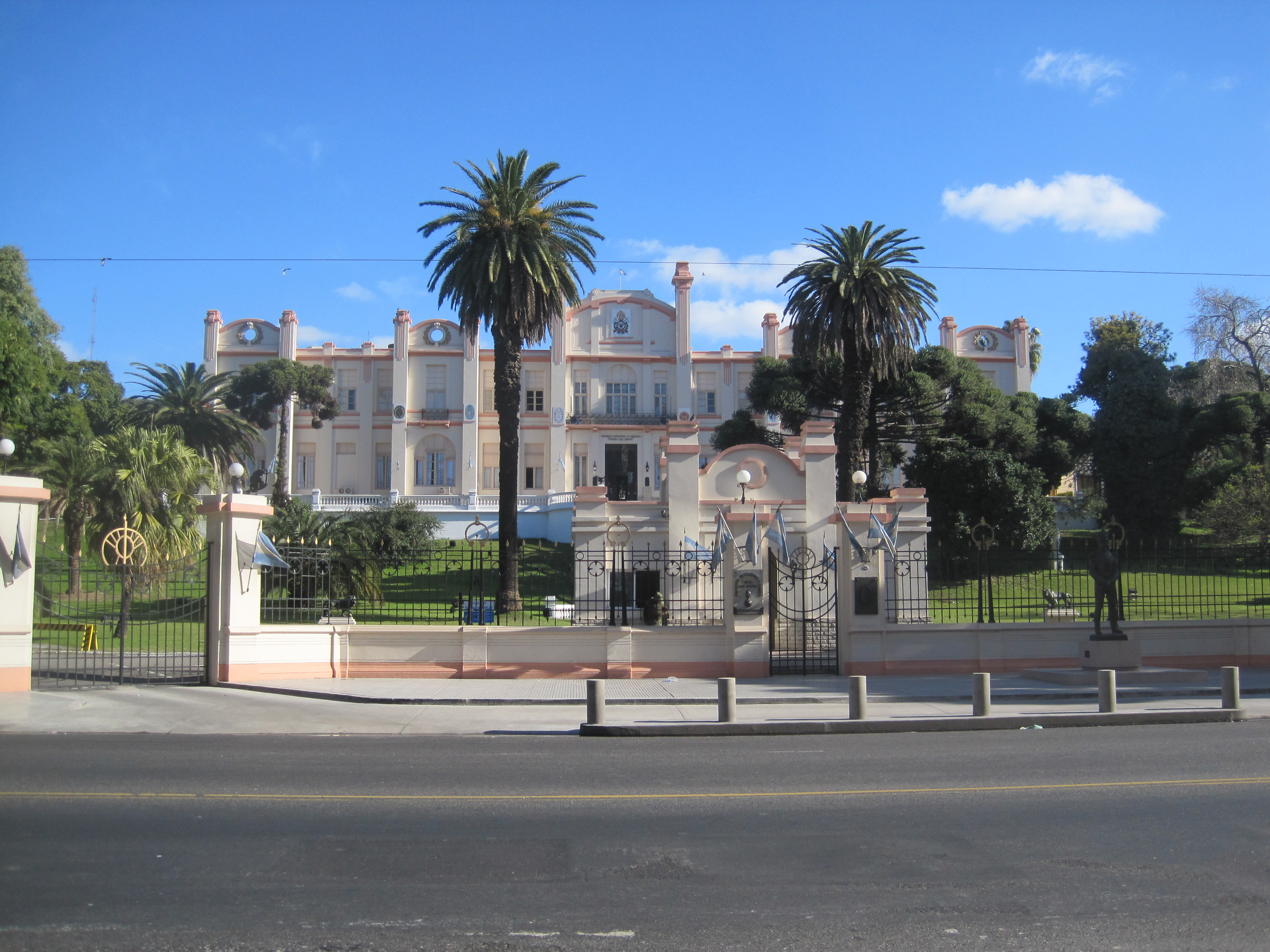
Headquarters of the General San Martín Regiment of Mounted Grenadiers, located in the Palermo section of Buenos Aires. Built in Vienna Secession style in 1907, it was declared a National Historic Monument in 1997

- Regimental HQ
- Alto Peru Fanfare Brass Band
- Mounted Ceremonial Squadron
  - San Lorenzo Troop
  - Maipo Troop
  - Junin Troop
  - Riobamba Troop
- Security and Escort Squadron (Dismounted)
  - Ayacucho Troop
  - Chacabuco Troop
  - Montevideo Troop (Logistics and Services)
- Reserve Squadron

=== Full dress uniform and ceremonial weapons ===
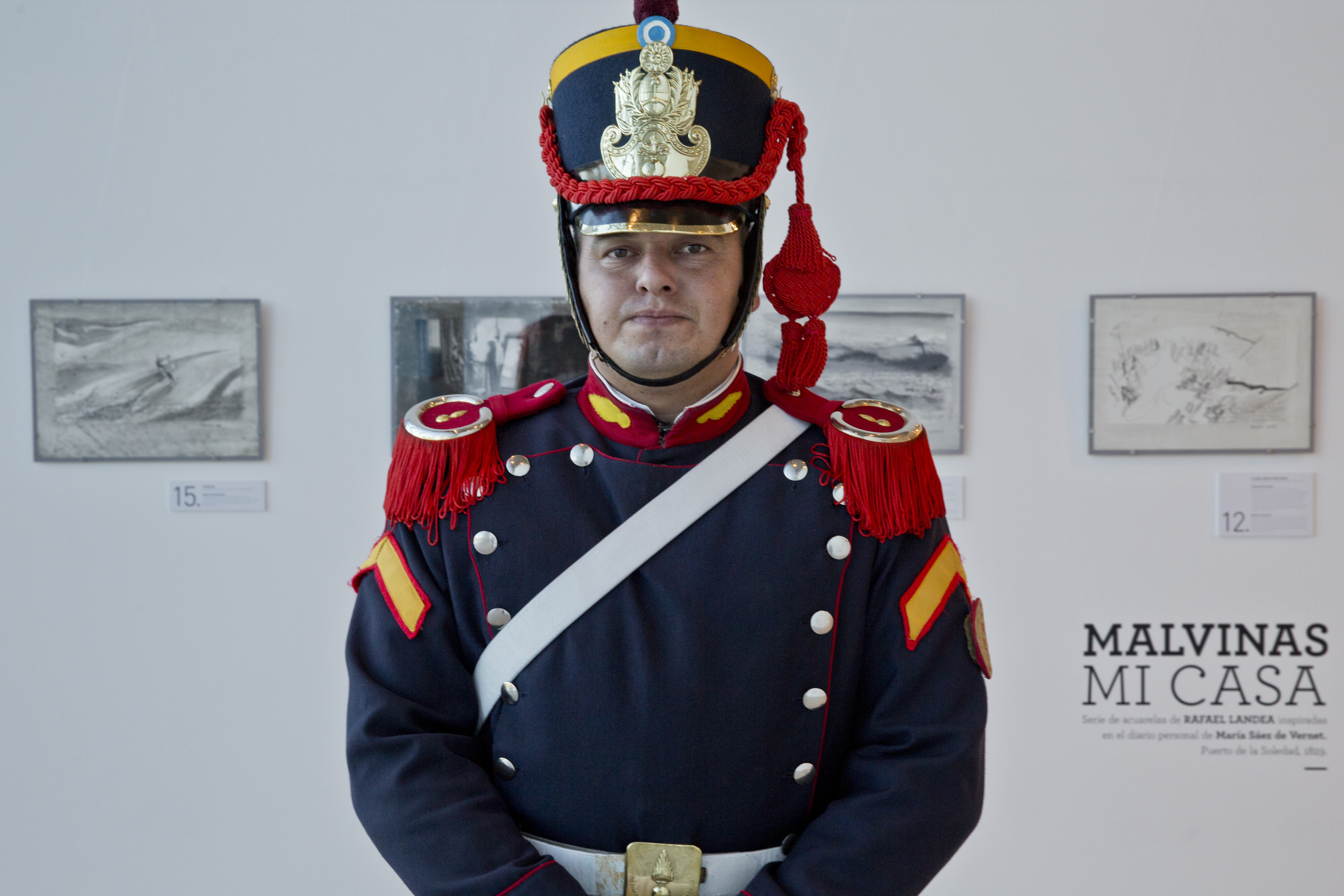
Member of the Regimiento de Granaderos in classic uniform

Officers

- Blue Shako with a Red/Blue Pompom
- Blue polo dress/battle uniform and pants
  - Gold Grenade badge
  - 9 gold Buttons
  - Epaulette (blue with red piping)
- Black Leather boots
- Cavalry sabre belt
- Cavalry sabre with scabbard

Enlisted and NCOs

- Red Shako with a Violet pompom
- Blue polo uniform with gold buttons and a Yellow grenade badge and pants
  - Epaulette (scarlet with red piping)
- Black leather boots
- Sabres with scabbards, cavalry Carbines (optional), lances

=== Alto Peru Mounted Fanfare Band ===
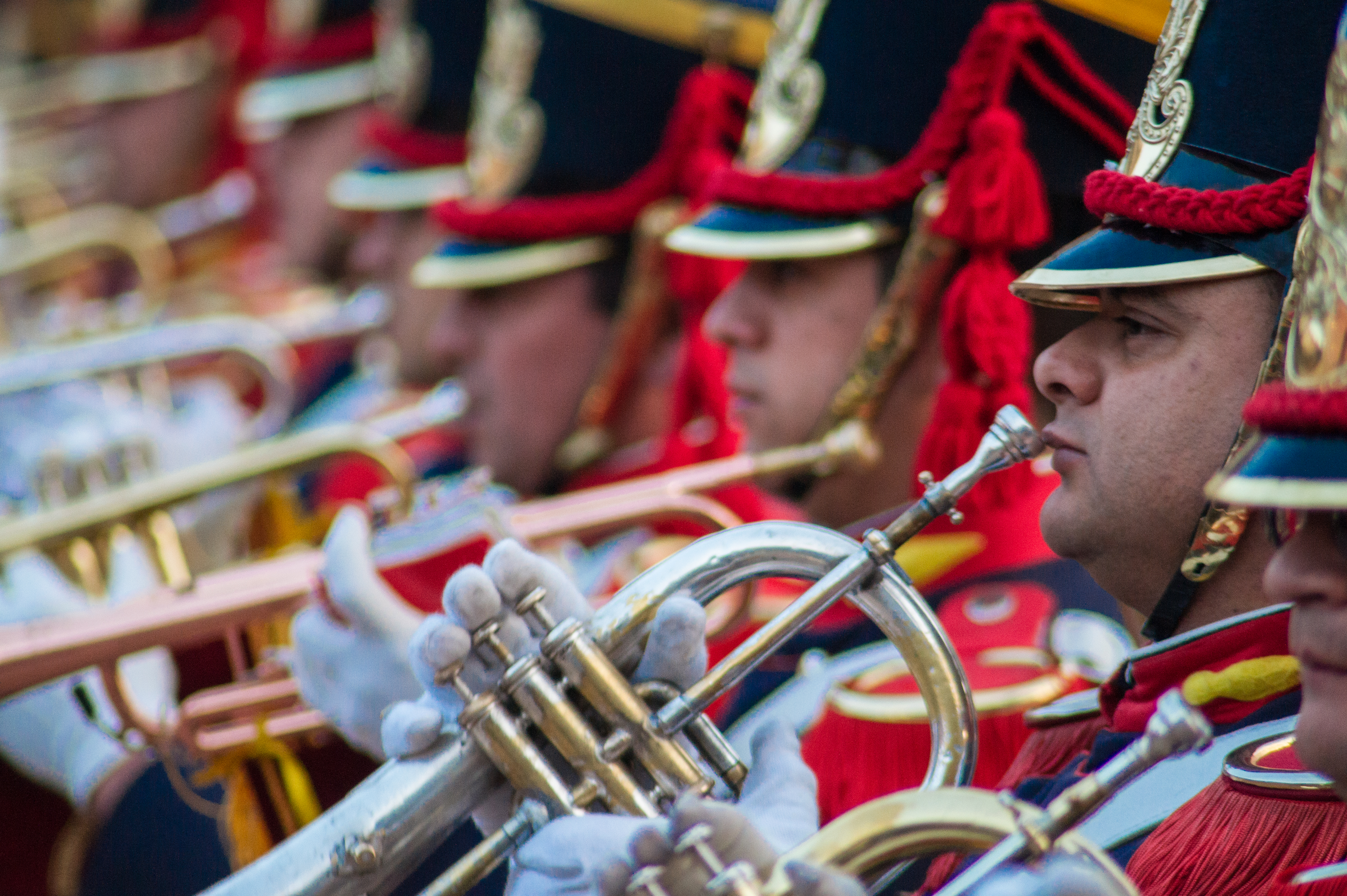
Alto Peru Mounted Fanfare Band

Established in 1929 as the musical support unit of the Mounted Grenadiers Regiment, this is one of the many military bands in the service of the Argentine Army, and one of the Army's few cavalry mounted bands. Like the bands of the British Army's Royal Armoured Corps and Household Cavalry and the French Army's cavalry and National Gendarmerie's Republican Guard cavalry, the band plays as both a regular military brass band and a mounted band.

When mounted on horseback, the band features trumpets, helicons, tubas, euphoniums, baritones, trombones, 1 wagner tuba, 1 flugelhorn, 4 timpani and 1 glockenspiel, and is led by the two Bandleaders with their batons. When performing on the ground, the band features trumpets, valve trombones, mellophones, tubas, baritones, euphoniums, 1 wagner tuba, 1 flugelhorn, 1 snare drum, 1-2 bass drums, cymbals, 1 glockenspiel, and field snare drums (formerly with the bugles or trumpets), and is led by the Bandleaders and a Drum Major (when mounted he serves as the Band Trumpet Major, who serves as the senior trumpeter).

== Other known equipment ==
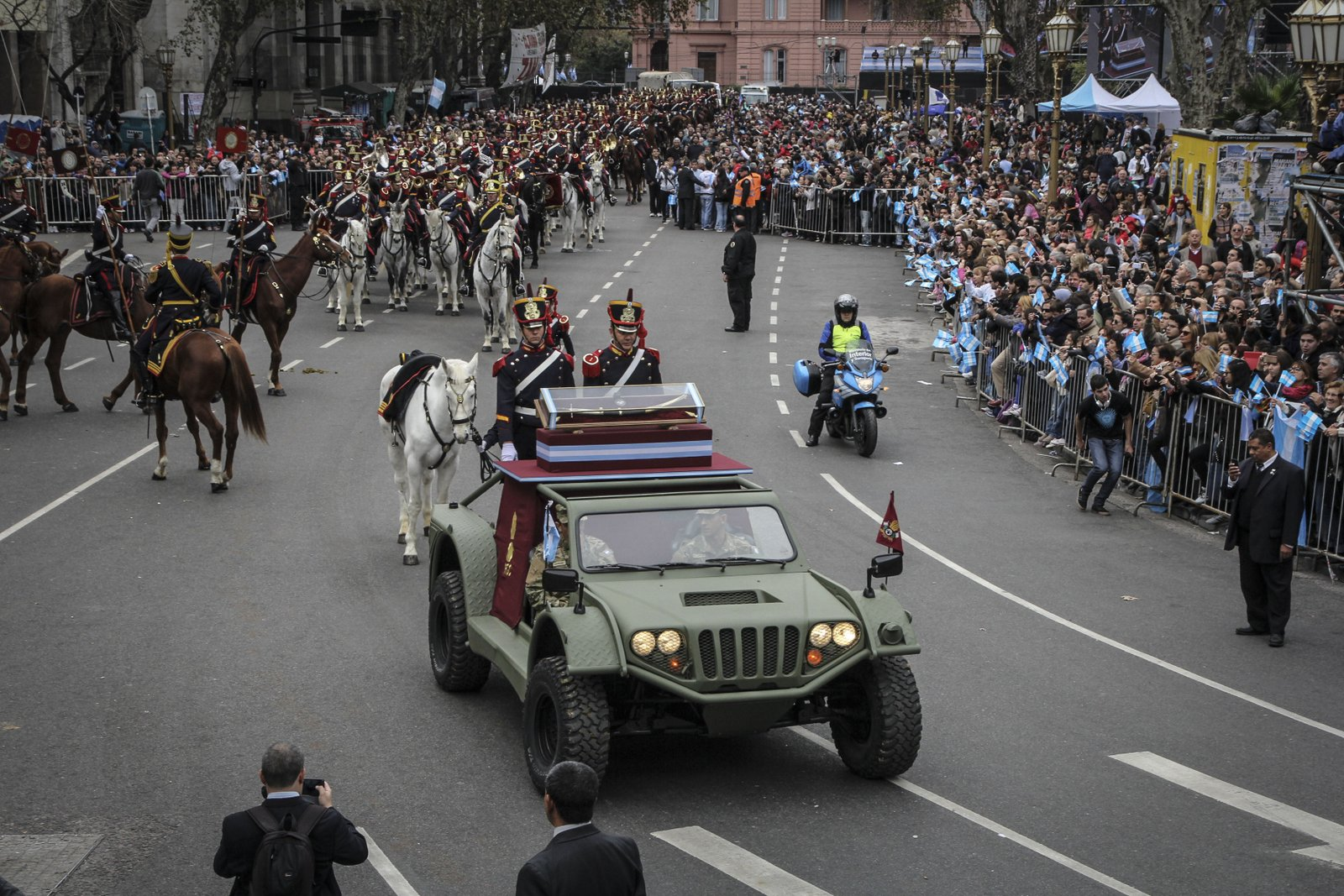
The regiment taking part in an important event in 2015 where the then President Cristina Kirchner ceremonially deposited Saint Martin's saber in the National Historical Museum.

- Criollo horse
- Mauser Modelo 1891 (Ceremonial)
- Browning Hi-Power P-35 pistol (produced under licence by Fabricaciones Militares): Standard sidearm of the Argentine Army (planned to be eventually replaced by the Beretta Px4 Storm)
- FARA 83 Assault Rifle (will likely be eventually replaced by a version of the Beretta ARX160 produced under licence by Fabricaciones Militares)
- FMK-3 submachine gun
- Bataan Modelo 71 combat shotgun
- M2HB heavy machine gun
- 7,62 Ametralladora Tipo 60-20 MAG machine gun (Model 60-20)
- FN FAP (Squad Automatic Weapon)
- GME FMK-2 Mod. 0: Fragmentation hand grenade, locally manufactured.
- M67 grenade: Fragmentation hand grenade.
- M79 grenade launcher
- AT4 anti-tank weapon (Now in reserve)
- MARA (anti-tank weapon)
- FMK-3 AT mine
- FMK-5 AT mine
- Modular Integrated Communications Helmet (replaced M1 helmet manufactured locally under licence)
- Uniforme de Combate Argentino (UCA): Battledress, standard uniform system
- U.S. Woodland camouflage pattern BDU type combat uniform, locally manufactured version in use until at least 2015.
- MB-230G light utility vehicle
- VLEGA Gaucho Wheeled all-terrain vehicle

== See also ==
- Argentine War of Independence
- Presidents of Argentina (1861-present)
- Argentine Revolution of 1905
