= Legacy of José de San Martín =

Impact of Argentine general and leader

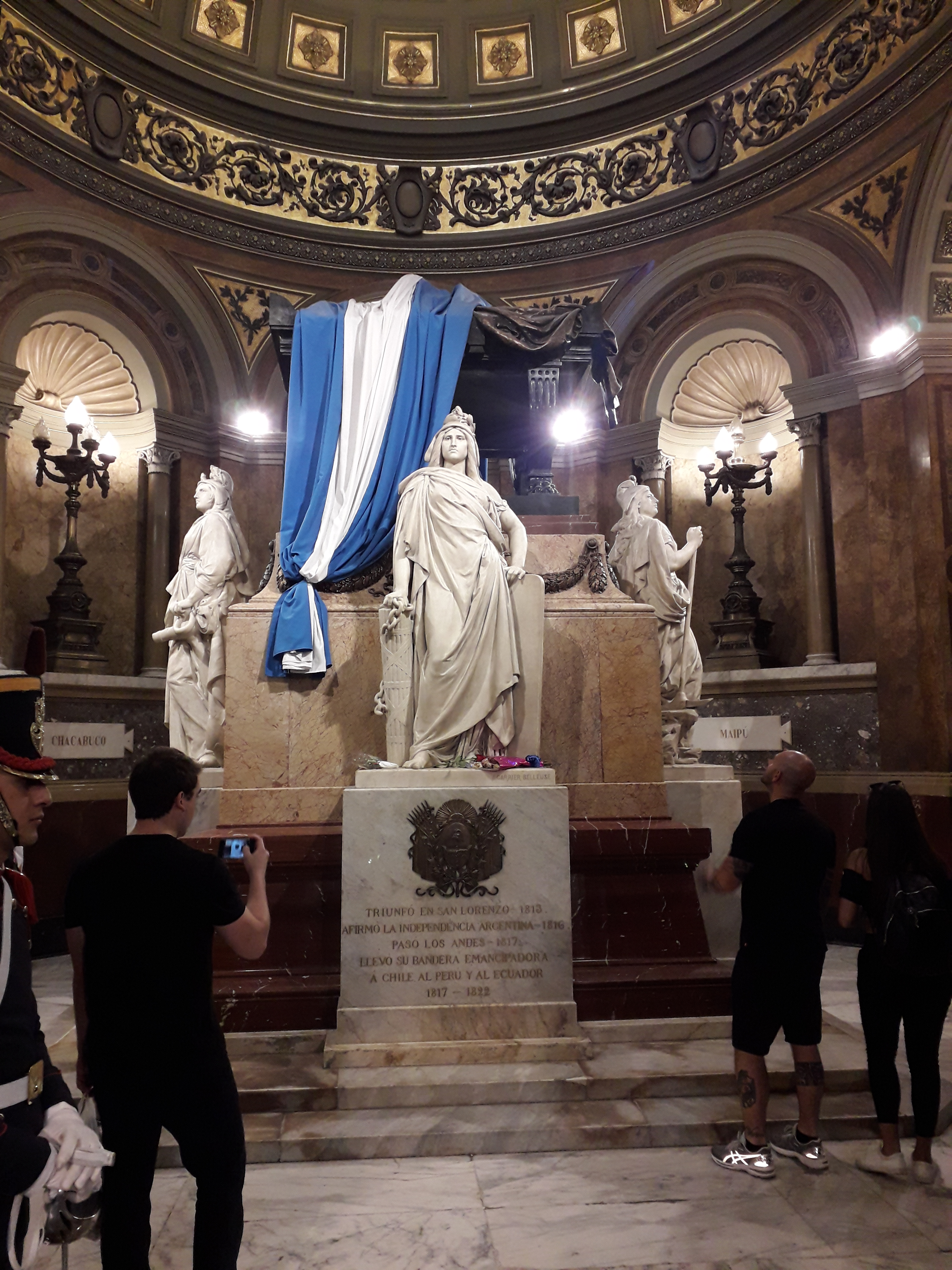
Mausoleum of San Martín at the Buenos Aires Metropolitan Cathedral. The three statues are national personifications of Argentina, Chile and Peru

José de San Martín is the national hero of Argentina, Chile and Peru, and along with Simón Bolívar, the most important Libertador of the Spanish American Wars of Independence. For this reason, he is paid homage and depicted in several cultural works of those countries, and even internationally. He led the Campaign across the Andes from Argentina to Chile which has been studied around the world for its complexity.

== Remains ==
José de San Martín died on 17 August 1850, in his house at Boulogne-sur-Mer, France. He requested in his will to be taken to the cemetery without any funeral, and to be moved to Buenos Aires, Argentina, afterwards. He also bequeathed his curved saber to the Argentine governor Juan Manuel de Rosas. Mariano Balcarce informed Rosas and the foreign minister Felipe Arana of San Martín's death. Balcarce oversaw the embalming of his remains and his temporary stay in a chapel of the city. He also sent the saber to Buenos Aires.

However, the rebellion of Justo José de Urquiza against Rosas in 1851, Rosas' defeat at the battle of Caseros and the resulting chaos delayed the move of San Martín's remains to Buenos Aires. Still, both Rosas and Urquiza organized public homages to San Martín, regardless of their ongoing conflict. Buenos Aires seceded from Argentina as the state of Buenos Aires, dominated by Unitarians who despised San Martín. Thus, the move of his remains was postponed indefinitely. Aware that there were no favourable conditions to the project, Balcarce arranged the creation of a tomb in the Boulogne-sur-Mer cemetery.

The remains of San Martín were finally repatriated on May 29, 1880, during the presidency of Nicolás Avellaneda. The mausoleum was placed inside the Buenos Aires Metropolitan Cathedral. As San Martín was suspected of being a freemason, the mausoleum was placed in an expanded wing of the cathedral.

== Historiography ==
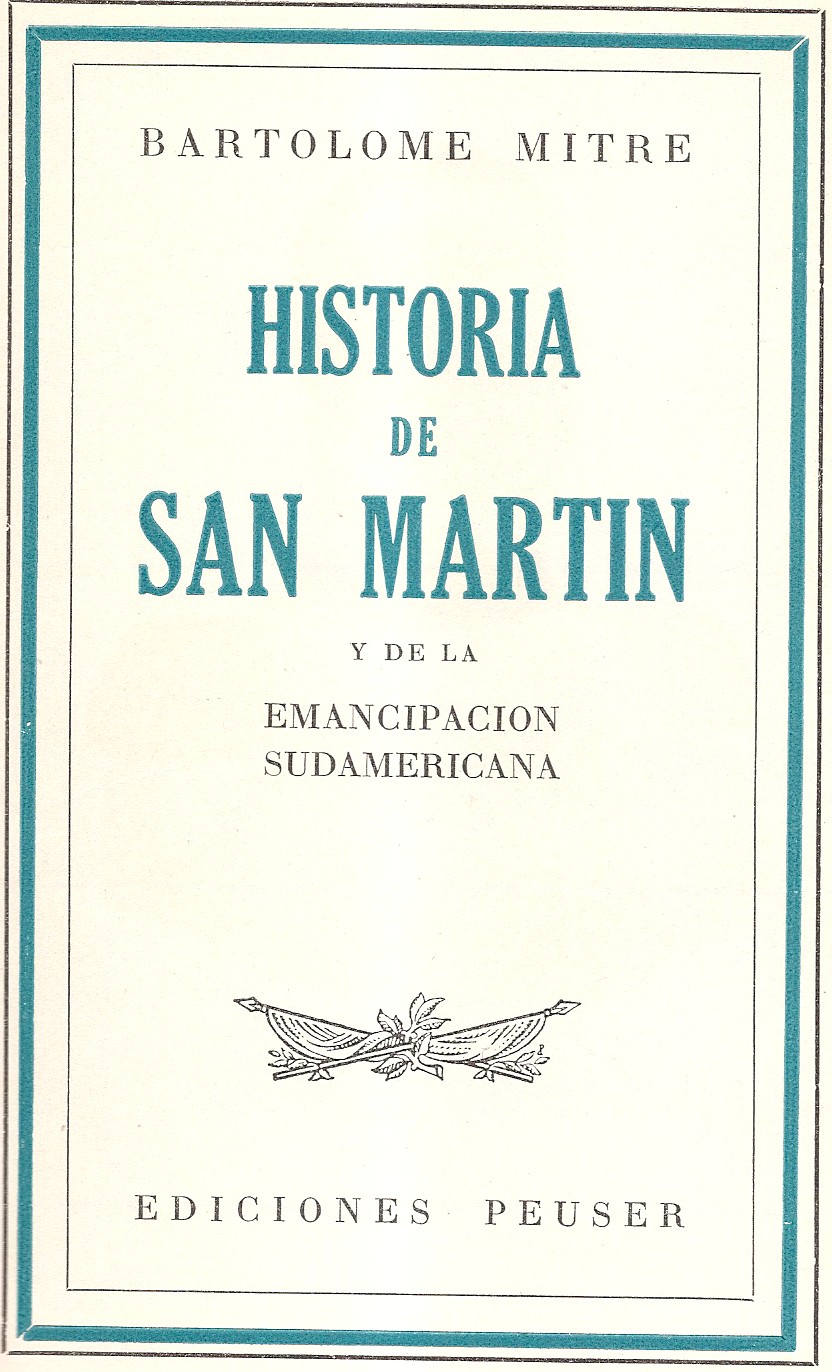
Cover of the book Historia de San Martín y de la emancipación sudamericana (Spanish: History of San Martín and the South American emancipation) by Bartolomé Mitre.

San Martín was first acclaimed as a national hero of Argentina by the Federals, as Rosas and Urquiza. Bernardo de Irigoyen published the Recuerdos del General San Martín (Spanish: Memoirs of the General San Martín) in 1851. The unitarians still resented his refusal to aid the Supreme Directors with the Army of the Andes against Estanislao López and Francisco Ramírez, which led to their downfall at the Battle of Cepeda, and San Martín's constant support to Rosas.

The unitarian Bartolomé Mitre wrote a series of biographies, and established Bernardino Rivadavia as a national hero of Argentina. However, as Rivadavia was a statesman without a military career, Mitre sought to create a military national hero, to complement Rivadavia, and wrote a biography of Manuel Belgrano. This attempt did not prove completely effective, as Belgrano had grave defeats in his military career. Thus, Mitre wrote a biography of San Martín, "Historia de San Martín y de la emancipación sudamericana" (Spanish: History of San Martín and the South American emancipation). By that time, several accounts of San Martín were being written at many countries: Valentín Ledesma from Lima wrote in 1853 about San Martín's campaign in Peru, and Benjamín Vicuña Mackenna from Chile wrote in 1856 about the Chilean War of Independence.

San Martín's support for Latin American integration contradicted the strong centralism of the government party. As a result, the biography written by Mitre modified details about him. The Spanish American wars of independence are not treated as a continent-wide revolution, but merely as an Argentine revolution that extends freedom to Chile and Peru. Bolívar is portrayed instead as a conqueror, annexing the new free countries into an artificial unity. The war is described to be separatist from the beginning, and encouraged and supported by Britain. However, in the specific case of San Martín this scenario could seem contradictory, as he had left America as a child and served for the Spanish army for 22 years. As a result, his military career in Spain is summarized in six pages (the whole book has more than six hundred), giving very little detail about him before his arrival to Buenos Aires. As for the reason for his departure from the Spanish army to join the South American ones, the book describes that "he decided to return to his distant nation, which he had always loved as a true mother, to offer her his sword and devote her his life". Meaning, that his first six years living in America shaped his personality more than the twenty eight he had lived so far in Spain. This point generated controversy among historians.

The historiography outlined by Mitre was first questioned in the 1930s, by historians who sought to update the information about Juan Manuel de Rosas. The support of San Martín to Rosas and the bequeathing of his saber was usually concealed or downplayed by the Mitrist historians, those new ones highlighted it. Later historians would point even more informations that contradicted the portrayal by Mitre, such as his good relations with the other caudillos and his personal enmity with Rivadavia, which included a cancelled duel.

== Monuments and memorials ==
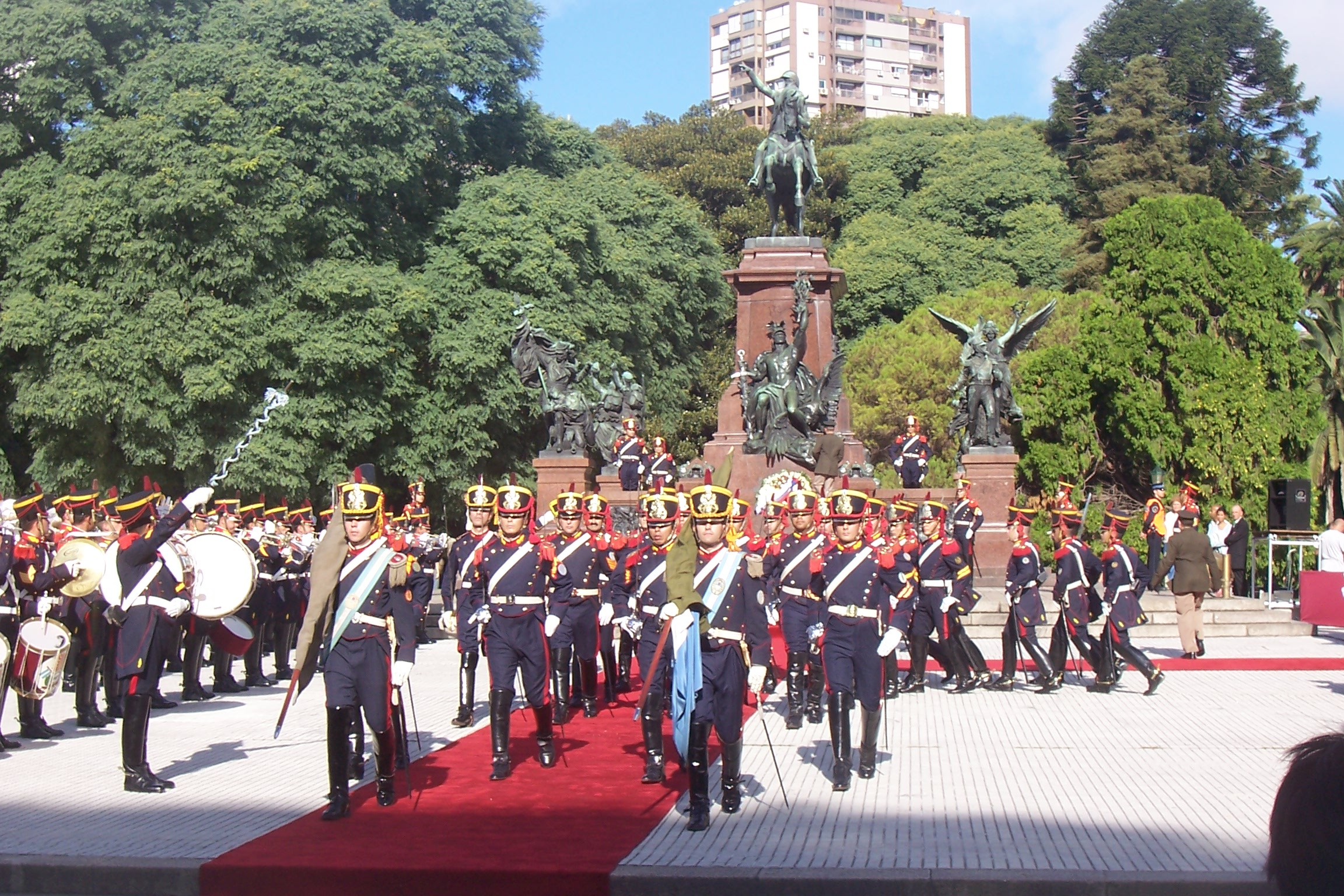
Granaderos regiment at the equestrian statue of José de San Martín, in the homonymous park in Buenos Aires, Argentina.

When the news of the death of San Martín arrived to Entre Ríos, the governor Justo José de Urquiza erected a column in his recognition at the main plaza of Paraná. Tomás Guido proposed a statue at the Santa Fe Province in 1854. Louis-Joseph Daumas began a monument of San Martín in Santiago de Chile in 1859, so another one was requested to the sculptor and rushed in Buenos Aires at the Plaza Marte (modern Plaza San Martín). The monument in Chile was inaugurated in 1863, and the one in Buenos Aires in 1862.

Statues of San Martín appear in most cities of Argentina, as well as in Santiago and Lima.

Two monuments were erected in Peru in the early 20th century, one in front of the Real Felipe Fortress in 1901 and another in Lima in 1921. A statue was built in Rosario in 1883. Santa Fe got one in 1901, Mendoza in 1904, Corrientes in 1806, and so on. Finally, the Cerro de la Gloria in Mendoza was inaugurated on February 12, 1914, an anniversary of the Battle of Chacabuco.

The neighbourhood of San Martín in Bogotá, Colombia's Centro Internacional area is named for the large equestrian statue of the General situated in a small plaza also named for him.

Santo Domingo, Dominican Republic, has an avenue named Avenida San Martín in his honor that connects the colonial zone to the west of the city.

An equestrian statue of the General was erected in Boulogne-sur-Mer; the statue was inaugurated on 24 October 1909, at a ceremony attended by several units from the Argentine military. The statue was erected through purely private initiative, with the support of national government of Argentina, the municipal council of Buenos Aires and a public funding campaign. The statue is 10m high, on a 4m by 6m base; it is well known to locals. Located on the beach, it was virtually untouched by the numerous bombings campaigns during both world wars.

There is an equestrian statue of General San Martín in Washington D.C. along NW Virginia Street. It is a copy of a statue in Buenos Aires. It was given in 1925 from Argentina.

There is also a bust of San Martin at the Intramuros or Walled City of Manila, which was erected in 1950 at the request of the Perón government as a reminder that San Martin's brother, Juan Fermín, served in the Philippines from 1801 to 1822.

There is an equestrian statue of General San Martín in New York City, on the southern side of Central Park. It was dedicated in 1951 and was donated by the City of Buenos Aires, Argentina.

There is a bronze sculpture at Belgrave Square, London, United Kingdom. Another outdoor sculpture is installed at the McGovern Centennial Gardens in Houston, Texas, in the United States.

There is a memorial featuring a bust of General San Martín in Beverly Hills, California. The bust was designed by Fernando Di Zitti and dedicated in 2001.

General Liberator San Martin Drive roadway in the Ku-ring-gai National Park north of Sydney Australia is named in his honour.

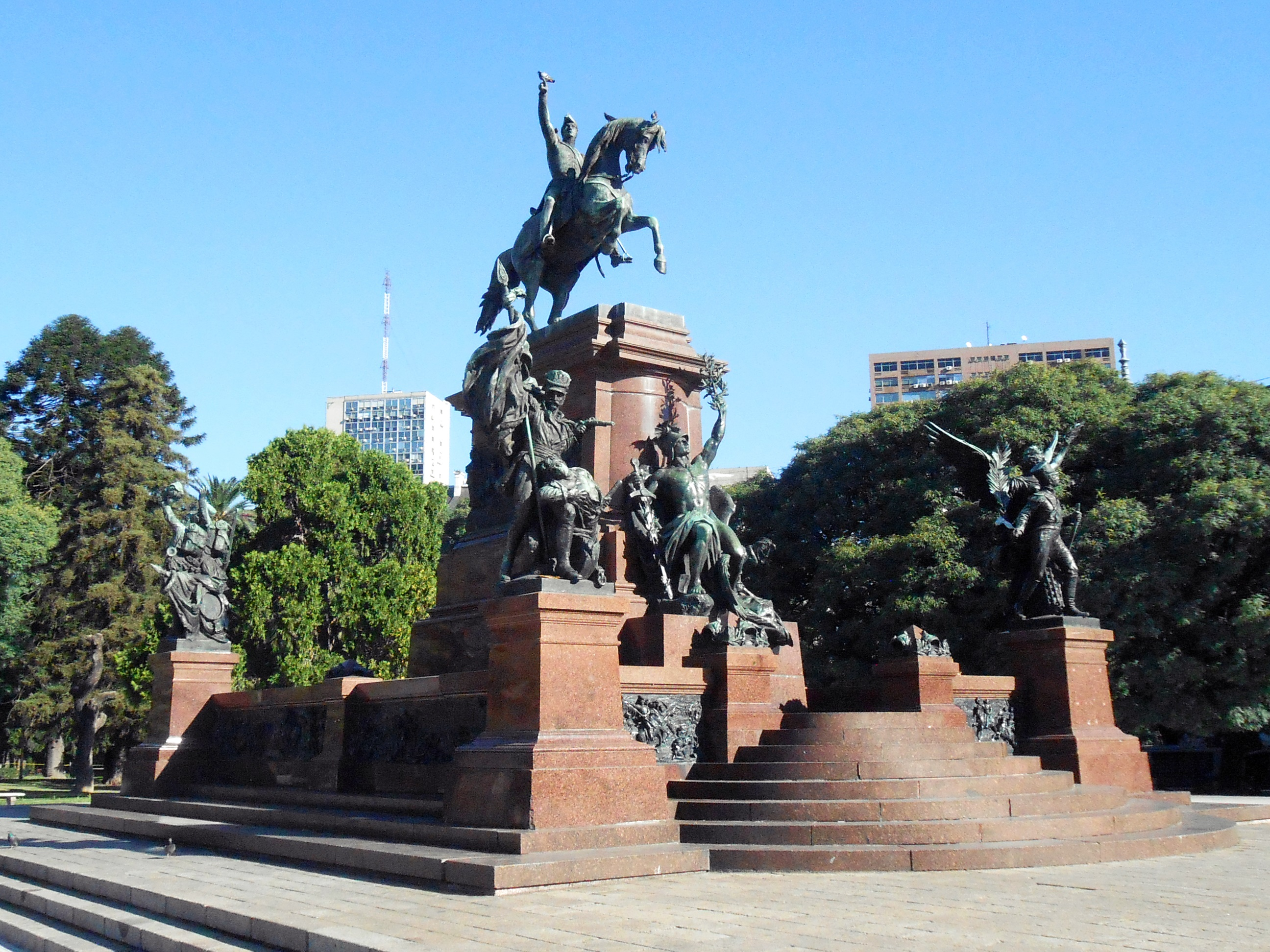
Equestrian monument to General San Martin at the homonymous park in Buenos Aires, Argentina

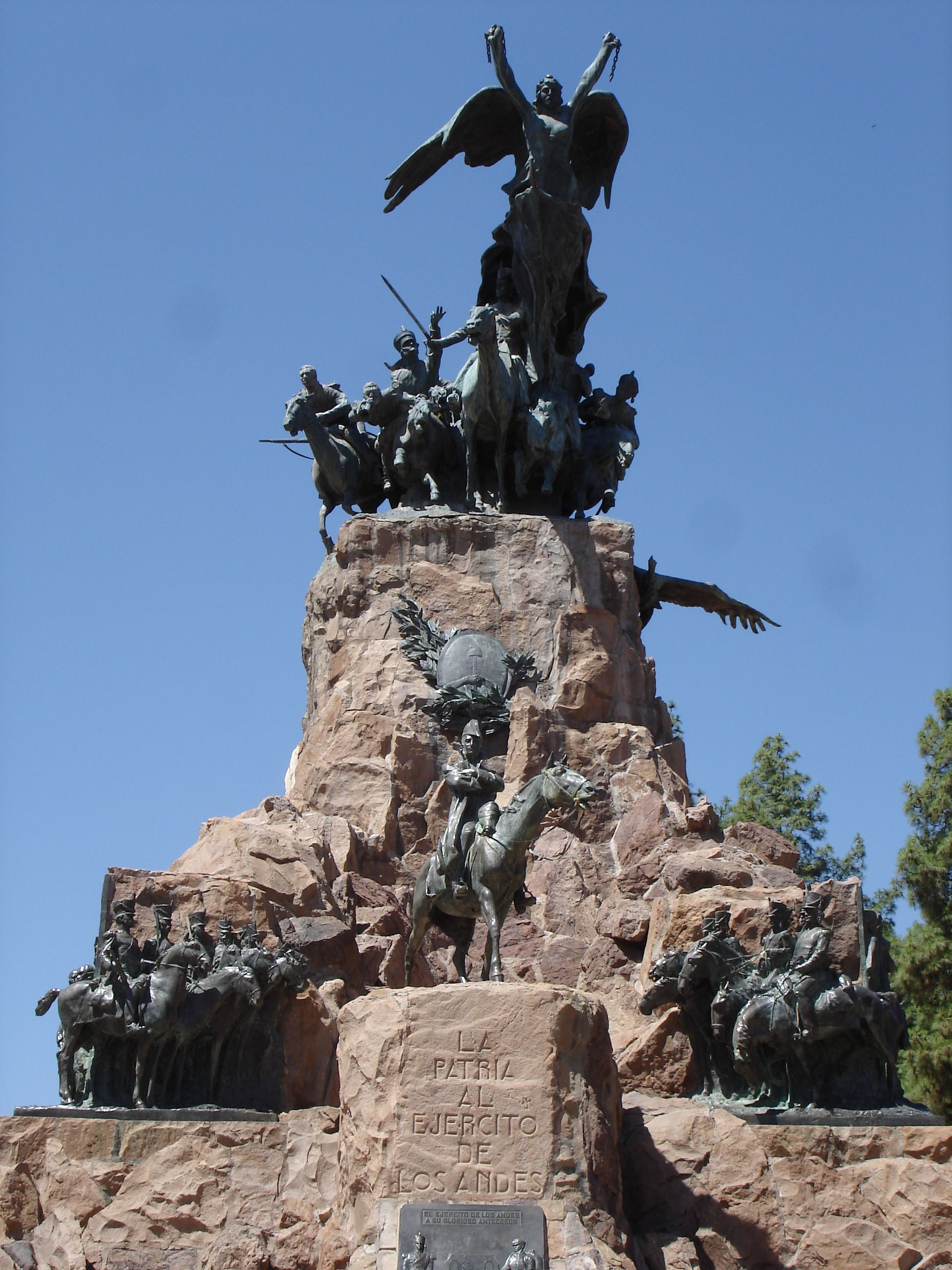
The Cerro de la Gloria monument in Mendoza, Argentina

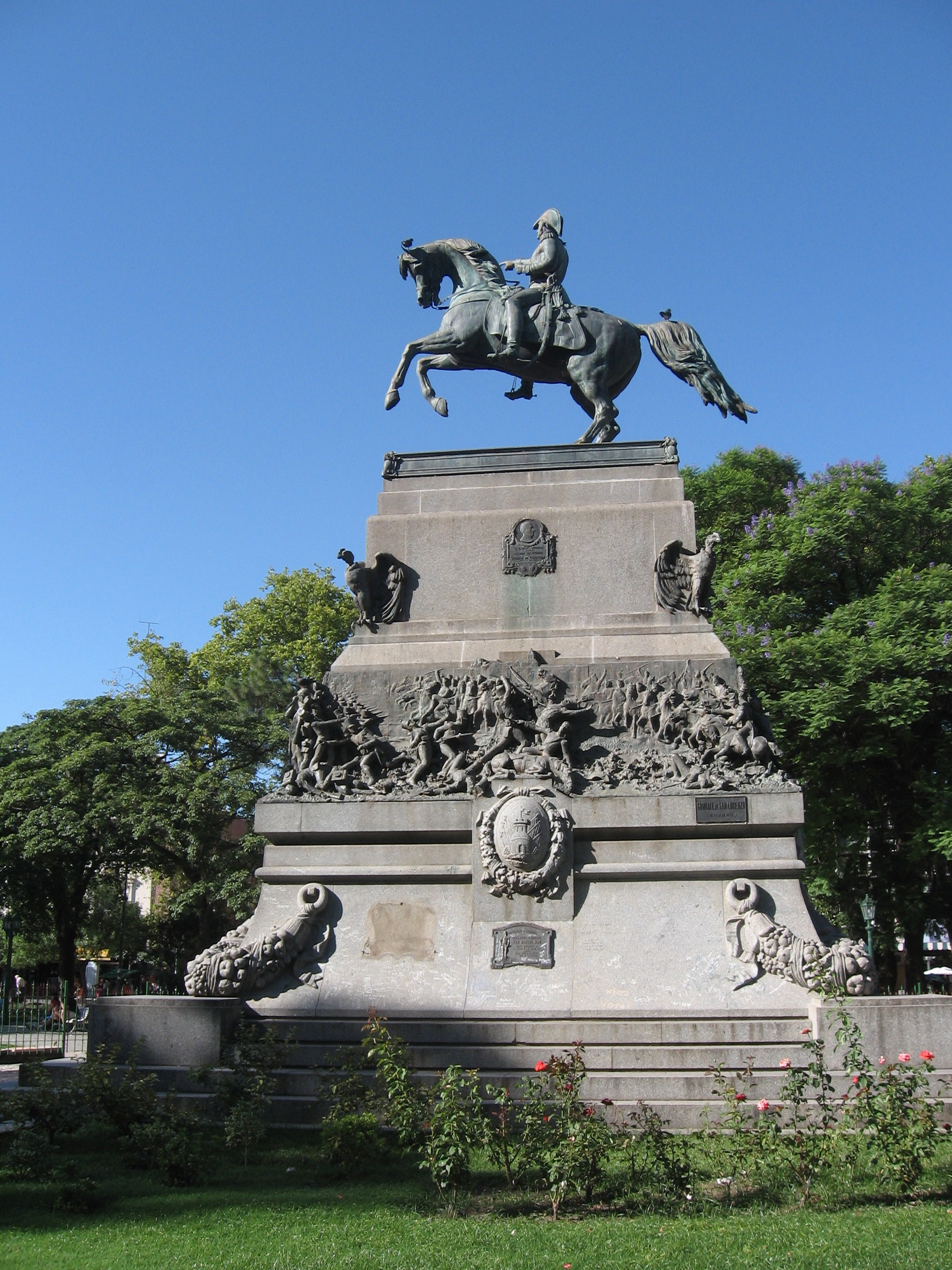
Statue of San Martin in Córdoba, Argentina

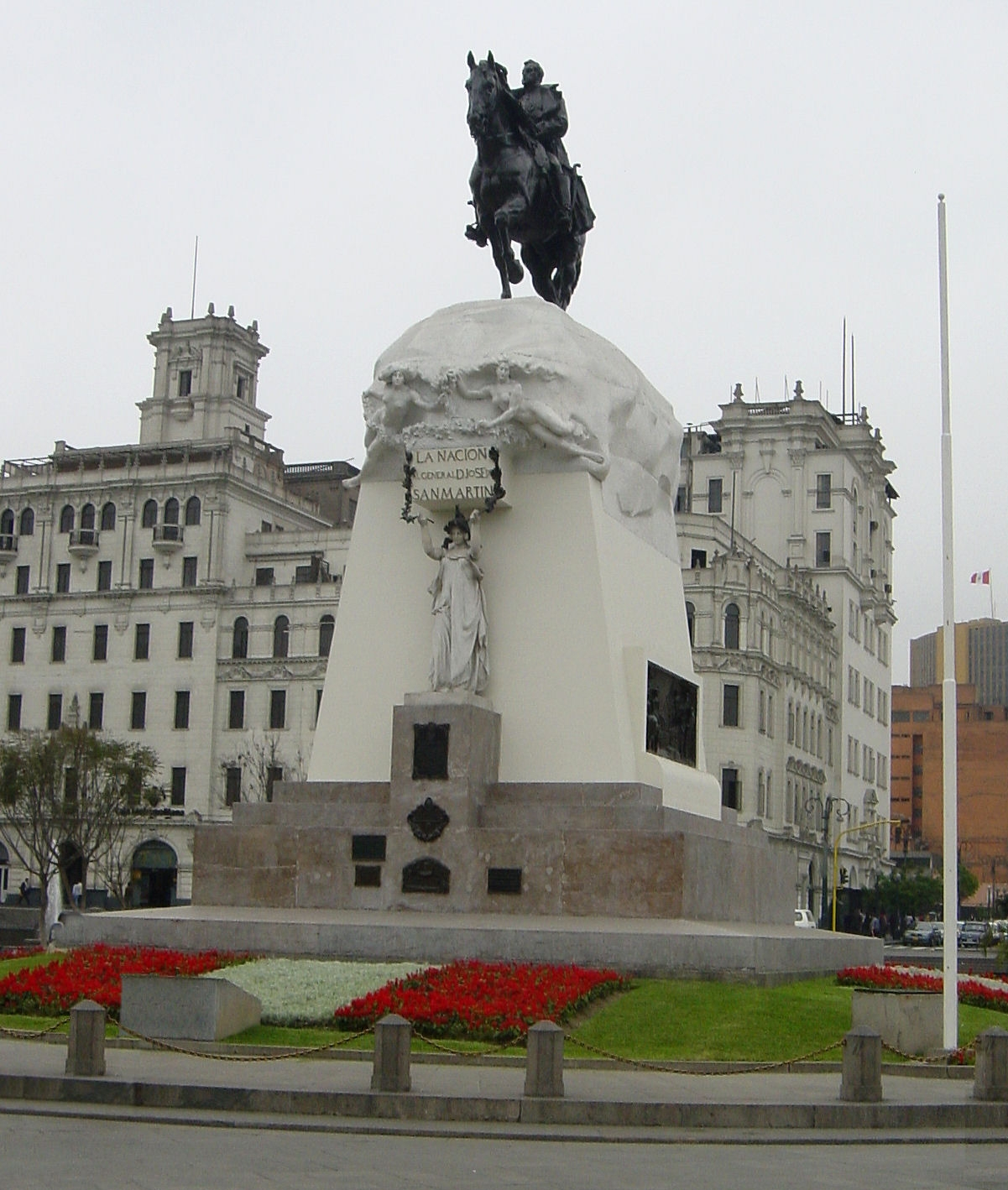
Statue of San Martin in Lima, Peru

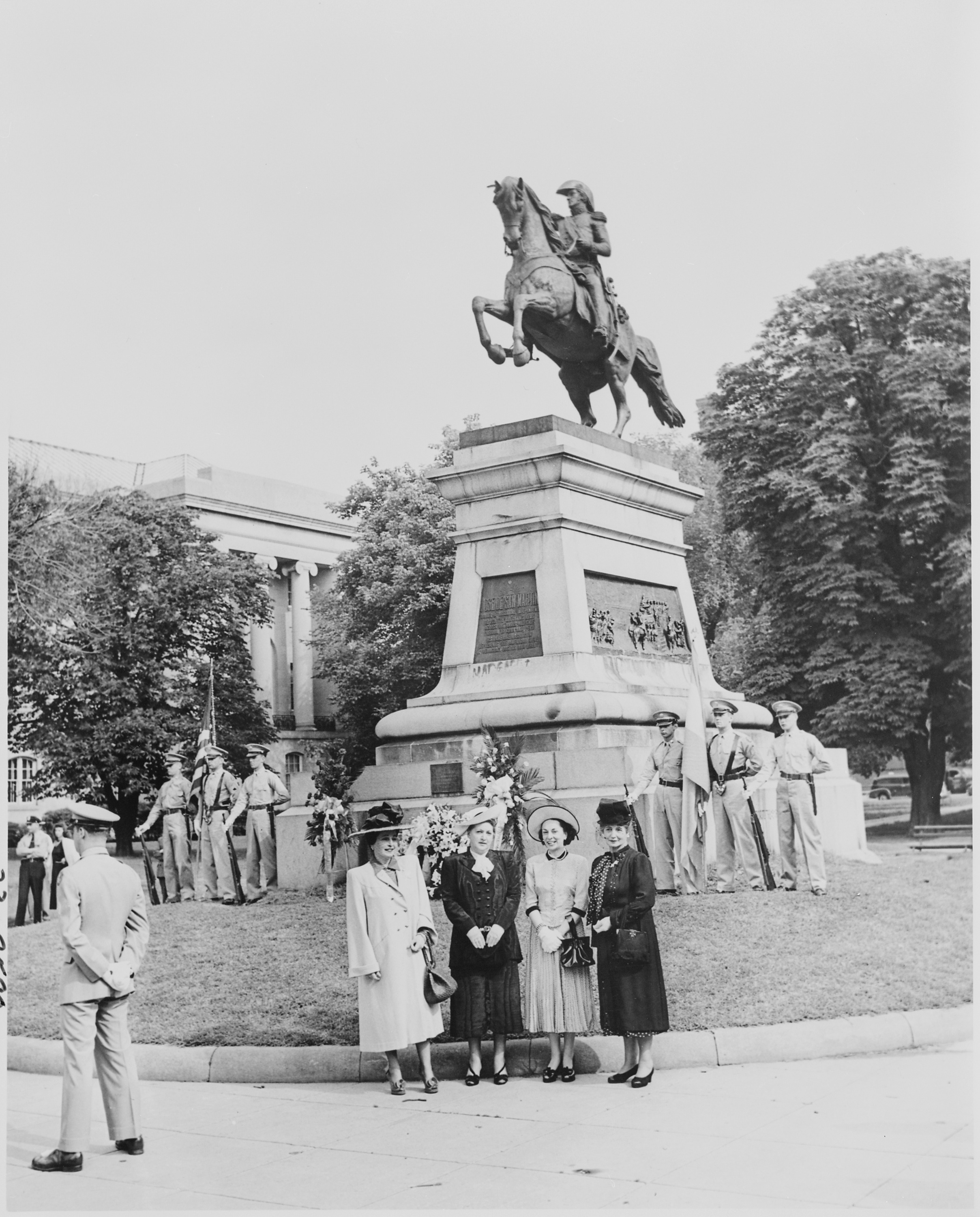
San Martin Memorial in Washington, D.C.

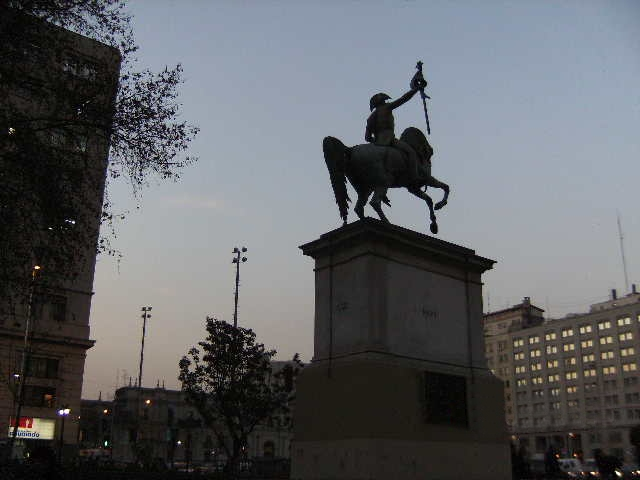
Statue of San Martin in Santiago, Chile

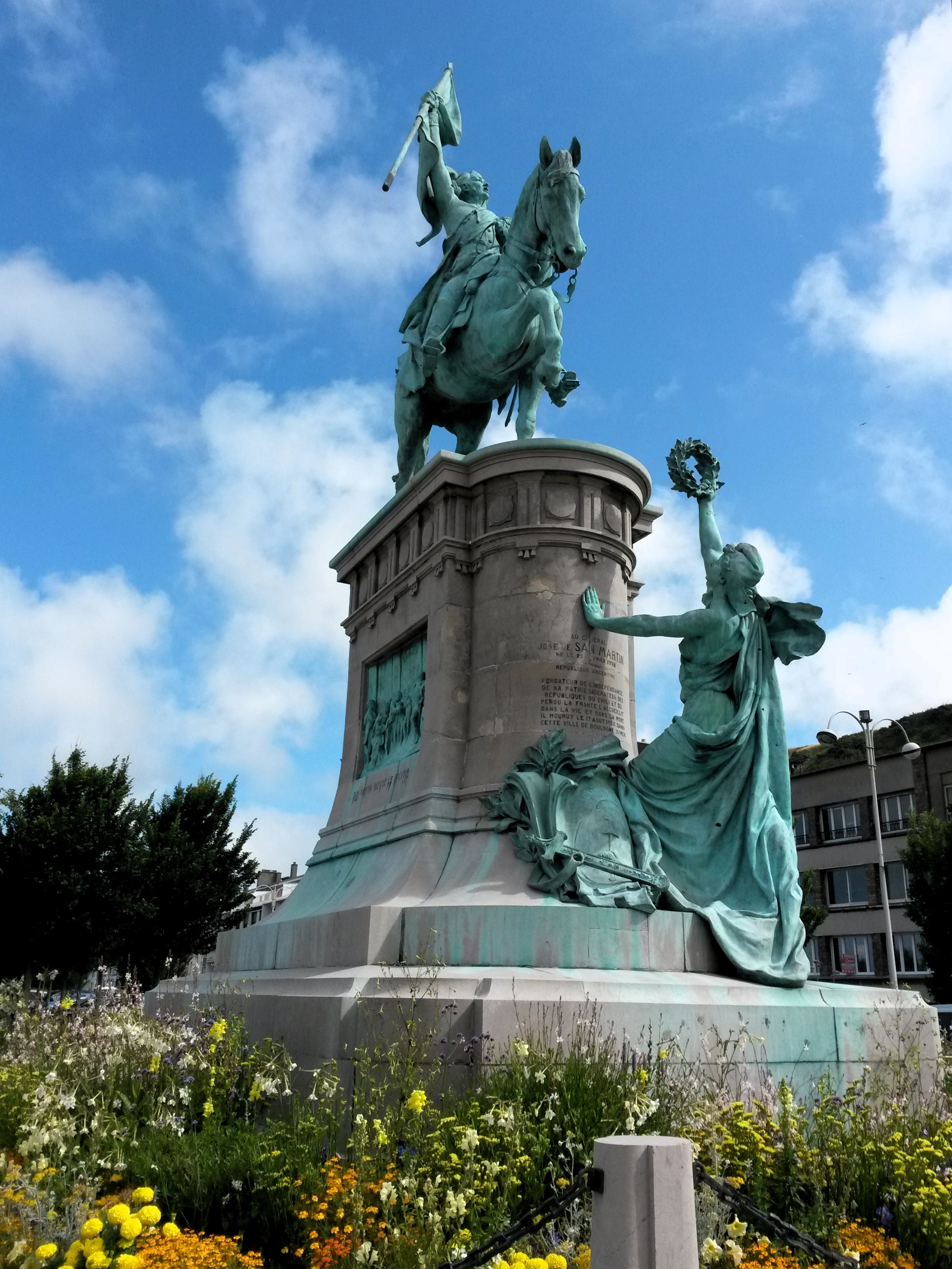
Statue of José de San Martín in Boulogne-sur-Mer, France. A replica stand in the city of La Plata, Argentina

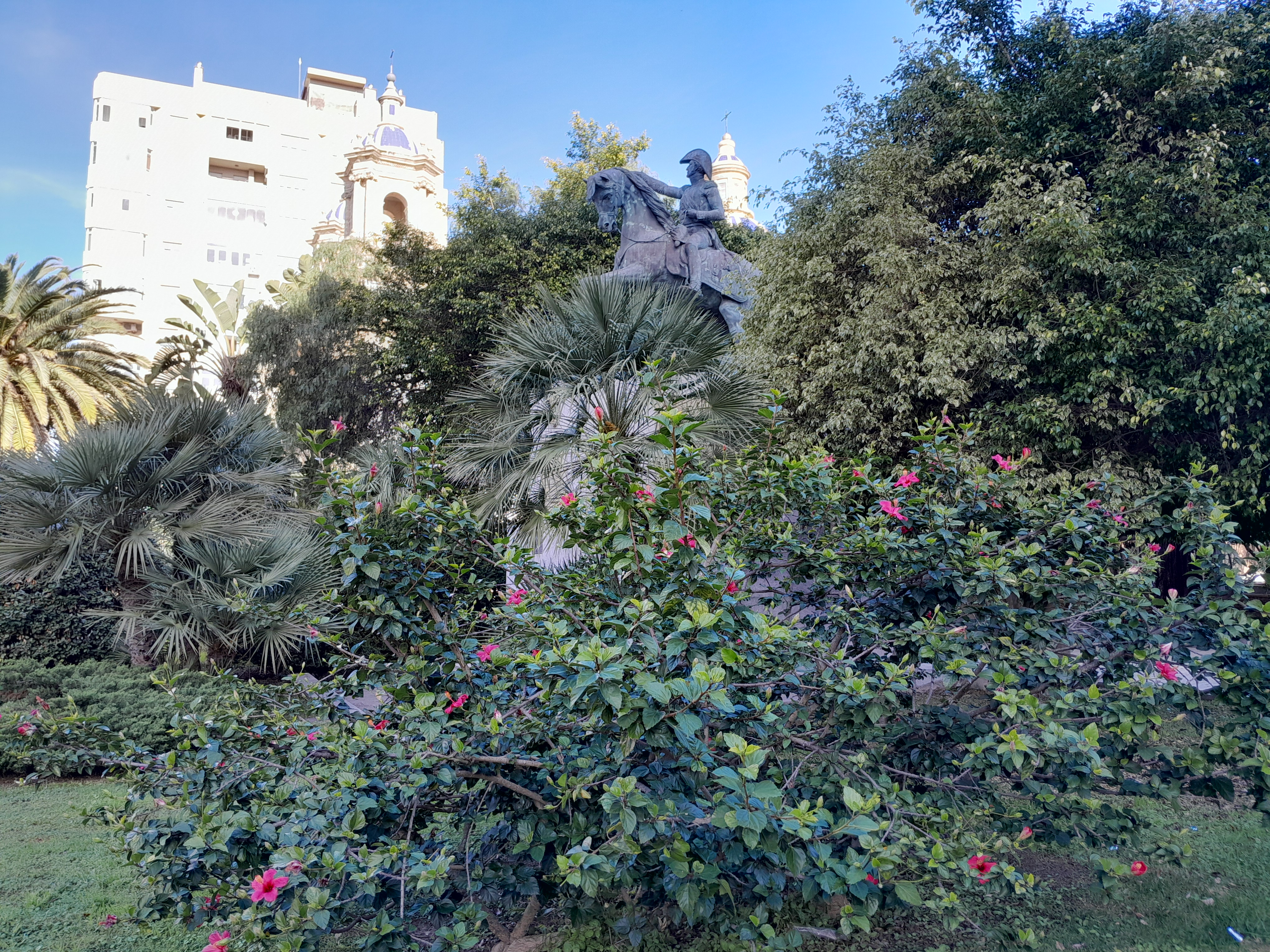
Statue of José de San Martín in Cádiz, Spain

== Anthems and marches ==
The battle of San Lorenzo, the only battle actually fought by San Martín in the modern territory of Argentina, is the theme of the San Lorenzo march. The military march was composed in February 1901 by Cayetano Alberto Silva following a proposal from Representative Celestino Pera. It was first officially played on October 30, 1902, at the inauguration of the monument to General San Martín in Rosario. The lyrics were written by professor Carlos Benielli in 1908. The march became famous in other countries and, according to the Argentine British Community Council, it has been considered in Europe to be one of the five best military marches ever written. The military bands of Uruguay, Brazil and Poland, amongst others, include it in their musical repertory.

Anthem to the Liberator General San Martín
Music: Arturo Luzzatt Lyrics: Segundo M. Argarañaz

Yerga el Ande su cumbre más alta,
Dé la mar el metal de su voz,
y entre cielos y nieves eternas
se alce el trono del Libertador.

Suenen claras trompetas de gloria
y levanten un himno triunfal,
que la luz de la historia agiganta
la figura del Gran Capitán.

De las tierras del Plata a Mendoza,
de Santiago à la Lima gentil,
fue sembrando en la ruta laureles
a su paso triunfal San Martín.

San Martín, el señor en la guerra,
por secreto designio de Dios,
grande fue cuando el sol lo alumbraba,
y más grande en la puesta del Sol.

¡Padre augusto del pueblo argentino,
héroe magno de la libertad!
A su sombra la Patria se agranda
en virtud, en trabajo y en paz.

¡San Martín! ¡San Martín! Que tu nombre,
honra y prez de los pueblos del Sur,
asegure por siempre los rumbos
de la Patria que alumbra tu luz.

Rise the Andes its highest peak;
Give the sea the metal of his voice.
And between skies and everlasting snows,
shall arise the throne of the Liberator.

May trumpets of glory sound clearly
and play a triumphal anthem
because the light of history aggrandizes
the figure of the Great Captain.

From the lands of River Plate to Mendoza,
from Santiago to genteel Lima,
he went, planting laurels along the way
in his triumphal journey, San Martín.

San Martín, the lord of war,
by secret choice of God,
was great when the Sun was shining on him,
and even greater in the sunset.

Great father of the Argentine People,
Greatest hero of freedom!
beneath his shadow the fatherland grows
in virtue, in work, and in peace.

San Martín! San Martín! may your name,
the honour and glory of the people of the South,
assure for ever the fates
of the fatherland enlightened by your light.

== Portraits ==
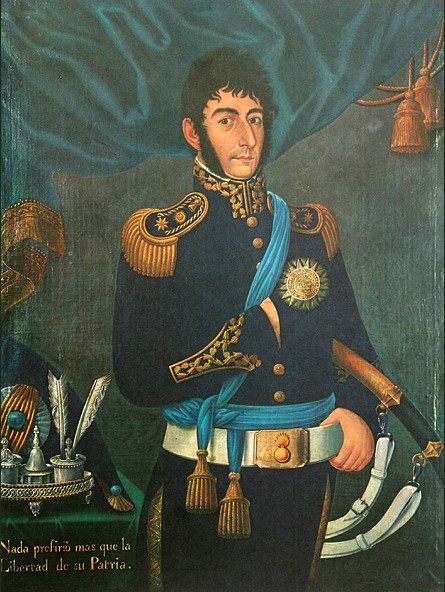
Portrait of San Martín by José Gil de Castro. It is the first known case when San Martín posed for a portrait.

San Martín was born in Yapeyú, Corrientes, in a poor family, and moved to Spain a short time afterwards. For evident reasons, he did not pose for any portrait during his infancy. Neither he did during his military career in Spain, as he lived in the barracks and it was not common to make portraits of young military. He was usually reluctant to pose for portraits, because of modesty and his frugal military lifestyle. During his stay in Argentina there is a drawing on ivory in his mounted grenadier uniform, of unknown author.

The first known case where San Martín posed for a portrait was the 1818 portrait by José Gil de Castro, made in Chile. It was painted after the battle of Chacabuco, as part of the celebrations for victory, and it was officially exhibited the following year, during the Chilean Declaration of Independence. Castro's portrait features a notable sharp aquiline nose, but that was part of his particular style, and his other works usually feature similar noses. It is unknown if he posed for other portraits in Peru: the one by the contemporary Mariano Carrillo was signed after San Martín's departure from the Americas, and the one by Drexel was made five years after it.

When he moved to Brussels, after his retirement, Jean Henri Simon made a medal of him. He posed for a new portrait in an unknown date for the artist Francois Joseph Navez, which is currently kept at the National Historical Museum. In 1828 the general Miller, who was writing his memoirs, requested San Martín to pose again, in military uniform. The work was done by Jean-Baptiste Madou. Madou made both a portrait and a testing lithography, which are kept in the aforementioned museum. After it, San Martín swore that he would not pose for further portraits. However, a new technology was developed in France by then, the daguerreotype, predecessor of modern photography. San Martín's daughter took him with pretexts to the house of the daguerreotypist and, once there, convinced him to pose for it. He posed for two daguerreotypes.

The first portraits of the crossing of the Andes featured San Martín mounting a white horse. This was done for visual purposes, to make San Martín prominent among the other soldiers, and the white color has visual impact. This led to the common misconception that San Martín may have crossed the Andes on a white horse, when he actually did so on a mule, which is better suited to move in the mountains.

== Film ==
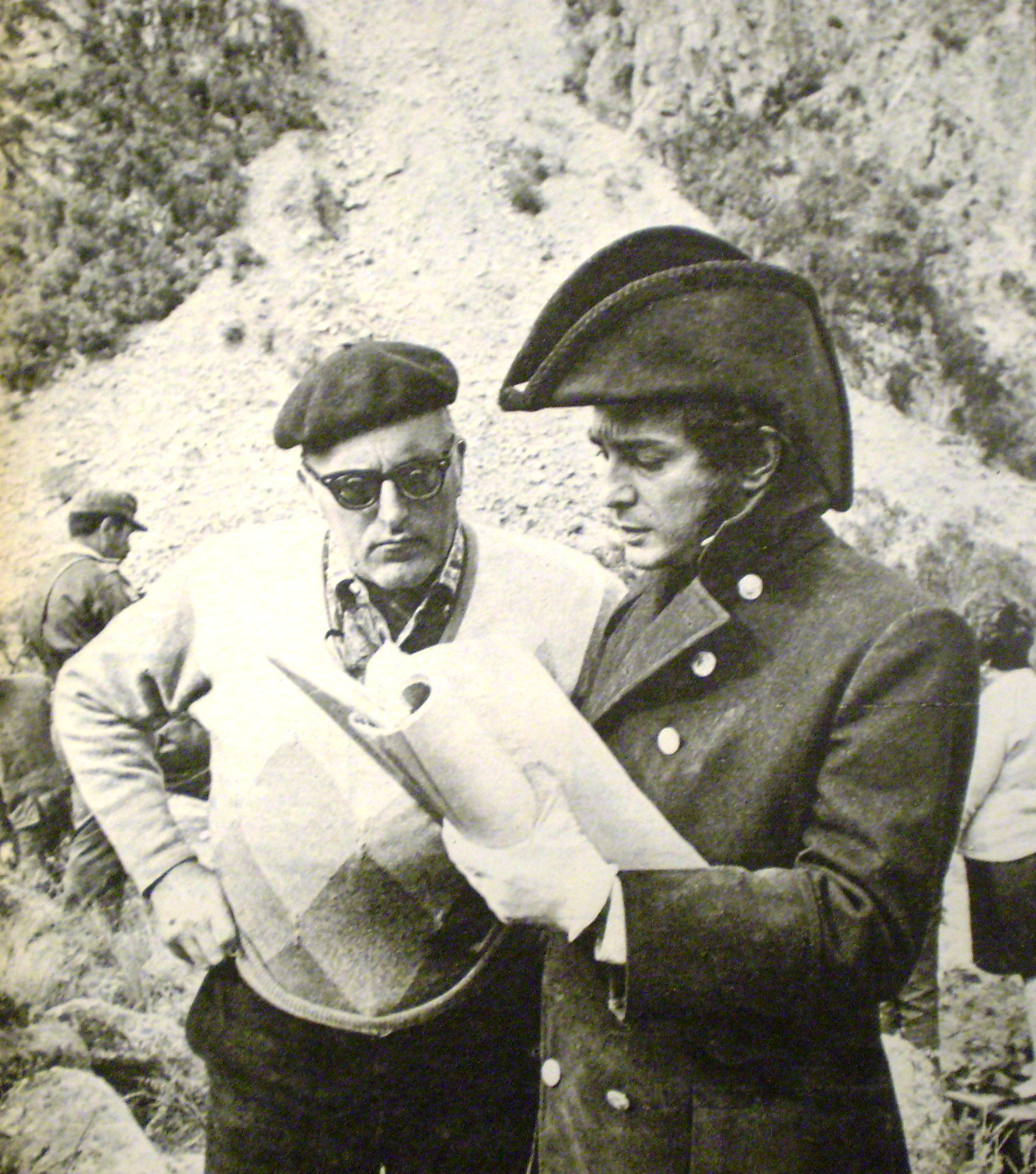
Alfredo Alcón as José de San Martín (right) and the director Leopoldo Torre Nilsson during the filming of "El Santo de la Espada".

The first Argentine silent movies were created in the 1910s, nearing the Argentina Centennial. José de San Martín was played by the novice actor Federico López in the movie "El himno nacional" (Spanish: The national anthem), singing the Argentine National Anthem. It was directed by Mario Gallo, who made other films related to San Martín: "La batalla de San Lorenzo" (Spanish: The battle of San Lorenzo), "La batalla de Maipú" (Spanish: The battle of Maipu) and "Episodios de San Martín" (Spanish: Episodes of San Martín). Those last three films are lost.

The first full biographical film of San Martín was "Nuestra Tierra de Paz" (Spanish: Our land of peace), from 1939. It was written by Arturo Mom and the main actor was Pedro Tocci. Except for the scenes at the Andes, it was all filmed at the Campo de Mayo military base. A new biographical film, "El Santo de la Espada", starred by Alfredo Alcón, was made in 1970. Directed by Leopoldo Torre Nilsson, it kept the technical crew and most of the cast of an earlier movie about the Martín Fierro. It was one of the most expensive Argentine films to that date. San Martín was used as a secondary character in the films "Güemes: la tierra en armas" (1971) and "Juan Manuel de Rosas" (1972).

The controversial National Reorganization Process reduced the popular interest in warfare films. "El General y la fiebre" (Spanish: The General and the fever) was an attempt in 1993 to make a film about San Martín without warfare. Written by Jorge Coscia and starred by Rubén Stella, it focused on his brief stay in Córdoba recovering from his diseases, and his opium addiction as a form of anesthesia. The 2010 Argentina Bicentennial renewed the interest in historical films, which led to a new biographical film of San Martín, "Revolución: El cruce de los Andes" (Spanish: Revolution: the crossing of the Andes), directed by Leandro Ipiña and starring Rodrigo de la Serna. San Martín, played by Pablo Echarri, was also a secondary character of the film Manuel Belgrano.

The 2010 Bicentennial of Chile led to the creation of the miniseries Héroes, with biopics of national heroes of Chile Bernardo O'Higgins, José Miguel Carrera and Manuel Rodríguez, along others. Daniel Muñoz played San Martín at the three films, "O'Higgins, vivir para merecer su nombre", "Carrera, el príncipe de los caminos" and "Rodríguez, hijo de la rebeldía".

== Bibliography ==
- Galasso, Norberto (2009). Seamos Libres y lo demás no importa nada. Buenos Aires: Colihue. ISBN 978-950-581-779-5.
- Mitre, Bartolomé (1952). Historia de San Martín y de la emancipación sudamericana. Buenos Aires: Peuser.
- Bordón, Juan Manuel (2009). "San Martín, entre la historia y el mito". Ñ (294). Clarín.
