= Inca plan =

1816 proposal for an Inca monarchy

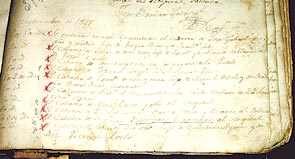
Records of the Recoleta Cemetery about the burial of Juan Baustista Túpac Amaru, proposed as King of the United Provinces of South America.

The Inca plan (Spanish: Plan del Inca) was a proposal formulated in 1816 by Manuel Belgrano to the Congress of Tucumán, aiming to crown a Sapa Inca to lead the independent territory. After the Declaration of Independence of the United Provinces of South America (modern Argentina), the Congress discussed the form of government that should be used. Belgrano proposed that the country be ruled by a Constitutional monarchy headed by a restored Inca ruler. The proposal was supported by José de San Martín, Martín Miguel de Güemes and the northern provinces, but found strong resistance from Buenos Aires. The Congress would ultimately reject it, creating instead a Republican government.

== Context ==
King Ferdinand VII of Spain was overthrown by French armies during the Peninsular War. The Spanish overseas colonies, like the Viceroyalty of the Río de la Plata, found themselves with a power vacuum. At the same time, the ideas of the Age of Enlightenment and the French Revolution were spreading, and as the captive king had overthrown his absolutist father Charles IV shortly before, it was thought that he shared the new ideas. This led to many riots and rebellions, and the Viceroyalty engaged in the Argentine War of Independence. However, Ferdinand VII was restored in the throne of Spain in 1816, and started the Absolutist Restauration. The patriots, who were so far fighting to replace the absolutist form of government with one closer to the new ideas, became fully Independentist by this point.

Contemporary to the War of Independence, the Argentine Civil War confronted Buenos Aires with provincial caudillos. Buenos Aires had been the capital of the viceroyalty and intended to keep exerting that power, but in the lack of a king and its vertical authority, the provinces felt themselves equally capable to rule themselves. Caudillos manifested the strong anti-Buenos Aires sentiment present at many provinces.

The Inca Empire had been conquered by the Spanish centuries ago, and the last sovereign Sapa Inca, Atahualpa, was executed in 1533. Nevertheless, the Inca heritage was still strong among the indigenous populations of the Upper Peru and Inca nobility was not extinct (among the Quechua people).

== Development ==
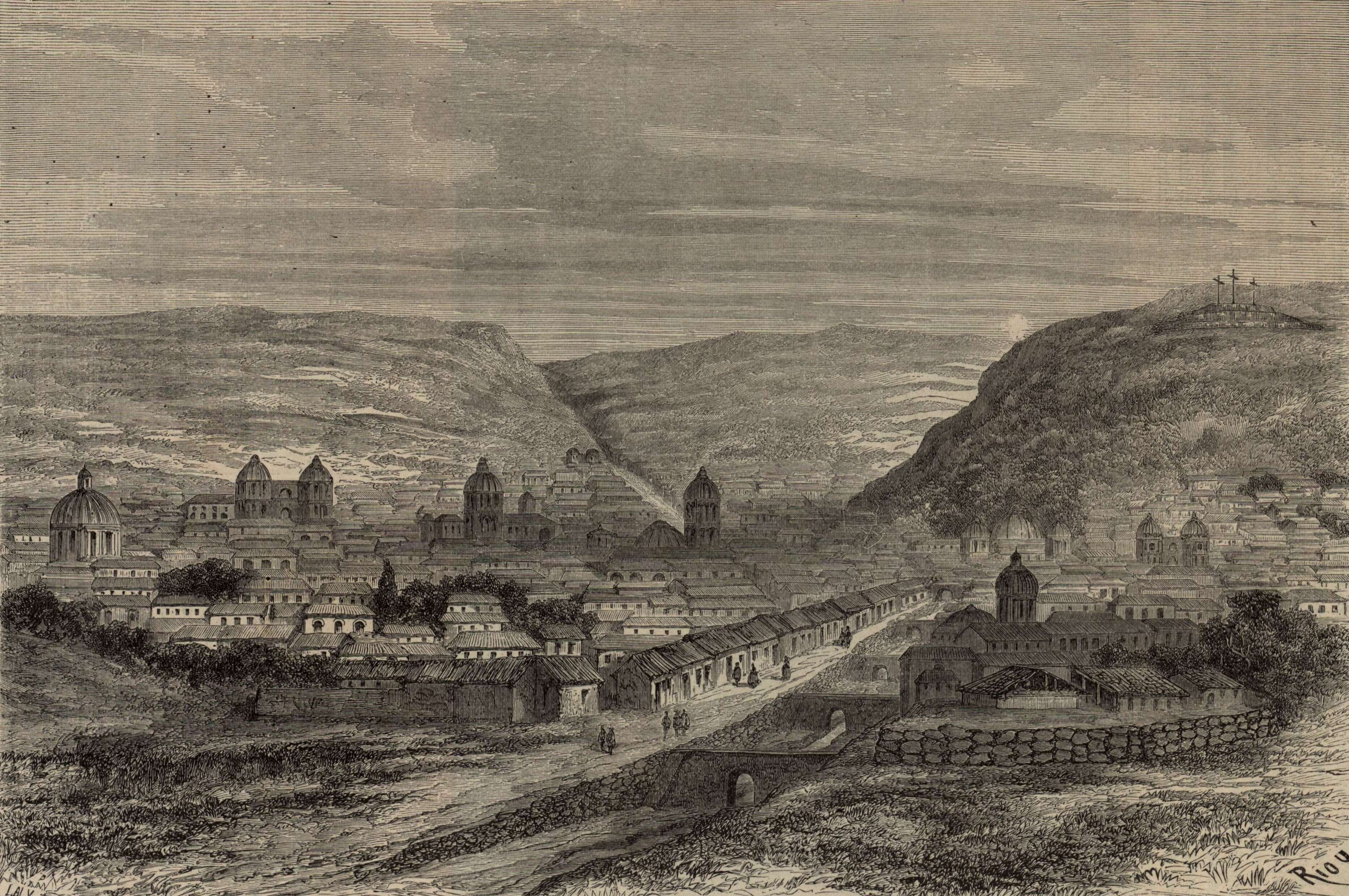
The city of Cuzco was proposed as new capital, replacing Buenos Aires.

After the return of Ferdinand VII to the Spanish throne, Manuel Belgrano and Bernardino Rivadavia were sent to Europe in a diplomatic mission, seeking support for the local governments. They failed to obtain it, but Belgrano realized that, unlike previous years, the republican form of government was not highly esteemed, and monarchies were preferred again. He also pointed out that the European superpowers looked favorably to the Revolution, until it led to anarchy. This led him to propose that the provinces were led by an Inca monarch. He reasoned that if the country was ruled by a monarchy, the European powers would be more likely to recognize their independence. And by restoring the Inca monarchy the pro-independence movement would gather support from the northern provinces and the indigenous populations. The proposal included as well to designate the city of Cuzco, former capital of the Inca Empire, as the capital of the country, replacing Buenos Aires as such. The idea, however, was not a new one: as early as 1790 Francisco de Miranda had plans for an Empire where a descendant of the Inca Emperors would reign. His proposal was a constitutional monarchy with a Legislative branch divided in a lower house and an upper house - the latter with lifelong members taken from local caciques.

A possible candidate to be crowned after this proposal was Dionisio Inca Yupanqui, colonel in Spain and deputee at the Courts of Cadiz in 1812, mentioned in a mail from Chamberlain to Castlereagh. He had a high social position, and by representing Peru at Cadiz he was already politically notable. Another possible candidate was Juan Bautista Tupamaro, also known as Túpac Amaru. As well as his brother Túpac Amaru II, he claimed to be a descendant of the former Inca ruler Túpac Amaru.

Belgrano's proposal was discussed again on July 12, being raised by Manuel Antonio de Acevedo, representative of the Catamarca Province. There was a strong support from the representatives of the provinces of the Upper Peru and the north west, the ones from Cuyo were divided, and the ones from Buenos Aires were against it. The representatives of Buenos Aires - who disliked the idea of losing power and being governed by a distant central government in Cusco - proposed instead as a monarch the young Prince Don Sebastián. Sebastián was a member of the Spanish Royal House (the Bourbons) but lived in Rio de Janeiro with his maternal grandparent, Portuguese King Dom João VI). A few years before, in 1808, British Admiral Sir Sydney Smith tried to convince Sebastián's father, Prince Don Pedro Carlos, to accept a joint regency with his future mother-in-law and aunt Dona Carlota Joaquina (herself a Spanish Bourbon and wife of João VI), under the name of the then-captive Spanish king. Carlota eagerly supported the plan hoping that she could rule the former Spanish colonies through her nephew. Saturnino José Rodríguez Peña and Manuel Belgrano also extended this offer to Carlota from Buenos Aires.

Although then-crown prince João had earlier considered establishing a court for Pedro Carlos in Buenos Aires or another Spanish viceroyalty, he now saw Carlota's ambitious plan as a threat to Portugal and Brazil and convinced his nephew to refuse the proposal. Nonetheless, Carlota was adamant on leaving Rio de Janeiro to establish herself as regent (in what would later be known as Carlotism) with her younger son Miguel as her heir. In May 1809 her husband managed to destroy her project by sending away Percy Smythe, 6th Viscount Strangford, the British Admiral who supported her would take her to Buenos Aires on his fleet. In 1810 the Buenos Aires junta, in conflict with the government of Cádiz, proposed Carlota as constitutional queen of the United Provinces (nowadays Argentina). She wanted to rule as an absolutist monarch which led to Buenos Aires to withdraw its proposal.

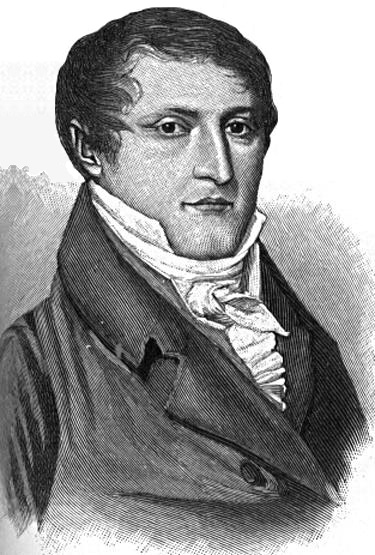
Manuel Belgrano proposed the crowning of an Inca.

The discussion was extended during July, and by August 6 Tomás de Anchorena stated his rejection to the proposal. He considered that there were conflicting perspectives between the peoples at the North and at the Pampas, with the later opposing the monarchic form of government. However, Anchorena would explain years later to Juan Manuel de Rosas, in a mail that was kept, that he supported the constitutional monarchy as a form of government but rejected the idea of crowning an Inca.

Belgrano told in a mail to Rivadavia that the project achieved complete consensus. Martín Miguel de Güemes also supported it. José de San Martín manifested his support as well, but requested that there was a single head of state and not a government body composed of many people, such as the Juntas or the triumvirates that had ruled the United Provinces a short time ago.

Incapable to force the rejection of the Inca plan, the representatives of Buenos Aires forced its delay, while promoting that the Congress was moved to Buenos Aires, which would allow a stronger influence over its development. Belgrano and Güemes wanted to keep it in Tucuman, and San Martín accepted the move, but conditioned that the seat of government of the Supreme Director was moved to the city of Córdoba. Buenos Aires prevailed and the Congress moved to the city in March, 1817. The Inca Plan was forgotten, and the Congress enacted instead an aristocratic Constitution and a monarchy as well, but the king would not be an Inca. It would be a Frenchman, the prince of Lucca (Charles II, Duke of Parma) The crowning of Charles was frustrated by the defeat of Buenos Aires during the battle of Cepeda, which ended the authority of the Supreme Directors and started a period of anarchy. The Prince of Lucca was a Bourbon related to the Spanish king; the French premiers Richelieu and Desolle supported the plan to disrupt British activities in the region. This plan came after Belgrano's proposal to crown Infante Francisco de Paula of Spain, brother of King Ferdinand, had fallen through and King Louis XVIII of France had vetoed Rivadavia's plan to have Louis Philippe, Duke of Orleans invited as king.

The Duke of Lucca was not only proposed as an Argentine monarch but the idea was to propose a marriage between him and one of the Brazilian princesses, whose dowry would include Cisplatina, then a Brazilian province. The United Provinces was at war with the Empire of Brazil over Cisplatina. The plan (both the Duke of Lucca and the marriage to a Brazilian princess) which had been approved by the United Provinces' parliament, came to nothing after the king of Spain - once again - refused to allow any member of his family as a monarch in one of his former colonies.

== Historical disputes ==
The monarchism of Belgrano and San Martín has been criticized by their biographer, Bartolomé Mitre. In his book Historia de San Martín y de la emancipación sudamericana, he considered that they did not comprehend the needs of the time and failed to represent the dominant popular opinions regarding the form of government. Even so, their works and military victories would have helped the country to become a democratic republic. Mitre considered the Inca plan an inconsistent project, without political or military foundation, which San Martín supported merely in order to strengthen the government and gather allies.

Juan Bautista Alberdi considered that it was a mistake to judge the monarchism of San Martín or Bolívar by judging monarchy and republicanism as abstract concepts. Historian Milcíades Peña also pointed that monarchy became obsolete when society became strong enough to face more advanced forms of government, but it was instrumental at earlier stages of the European historical development to turn isolated fiefs and cities into countries with strong centralized governments. From this perspective, they would have promoted monarchism because the social development of Hispanic South America was closer to feudal Europe than to its Early modern period.

According to Alberdi, the real dispute was not really between the monarchic or republican form of government, but about the relations between Buenos Aires and the other provinces. The supporters of the Inca plan aimed to create a strong centralized government uniting all the Hispanic South America, whereas Buenos Aires attempted to keep its regional hegemony intact. He described them as "Two countries, two causes, two interests, two debts, two credits, two treasuries, two patriotisms, under the external colours of a sole country. Buenos Aires colonizes the provinces in the name of freedom, it has taken them under its yoke in the name of independence".

== See also ==
- Congress of Tucumán
- Argentine War of Independence

== Bibliography ==
- Calmon, Pedro. História de D. Pedro II. 5 v. Rio de Janeiro: J. Olympio, 1975. (in Portuguese)
- Galasso, Norberto (2009). Seamos Libres y lo demás no importa nada. Buenos Aires: Colihue. ISBN 978-950-581-779-5.
- Luna, Félix (2004). Grandes protagonistas de la Historia Argentina: Manuel Belgrano (in Spanish). Buenos Aires: Grupo Editorial Planeta. ISBN 950-49-1247-8.
- Macaulay, Neill. Dom Pedro I: a luta pela liberdade no Brasil e em Portugal, 1798-1834. Rio de Janeiro: Record, 1993. ISBN 8501038652 (in Portuguese)
  - Dom Pedro: the struggle for liberty in Brazil and Portugal, 1798–1834 (1986, ISBN 978-0-8223-0681-8)
- Mitre, Bartolomé (1952). Historia de San Martín y de la emancipación sudamericana. Buenos Aires: Peuser.
