= Early life of José de San Martín =

Argentine general

José de San Martín was an Argentine general and the prime leader of the southern part of South America's successful struggle for independence from Spain.

== Year of birth controversy ==
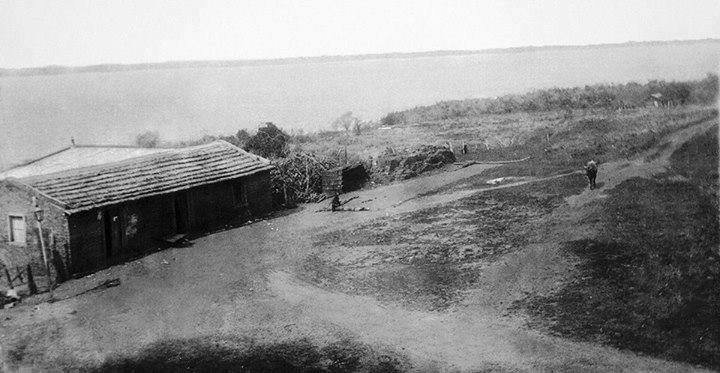
The house where José de San Martín was born, sited in Yapeyú, Corrientes, photographed in 1899

Juan García del Río, a close friend of San Martín, wrote a brief biography of him in 1823, stating that he was born in 1778. The historian Bartolomé Mitre, author of "Historia de San Martín y de la emancipación sudamericana took the date as correct, and it remained canonical since then. However, later investigations would generate doubts about the accuracy of the year. No record of his baptism have been found so far. In his marriage, in 1812, he declared being 31 years old, meaning he would have been born in 1781. However, such a date has been rejected, as San Martín joined the Regiment of Murcia on July 21, 1789, and he couldn't have done so being just eight years old, as twelve was the minimum age required to do so. San Martín's age became even more uncertain when his military service records were examined, as they attribute him inconsistent ages. In 1803 he's reported to be 20 years old (i.e. born in 1783), in 1806 with 27 years (i.e. born in 1779) and in 1808 with 26 years (i.e. born in 1782).

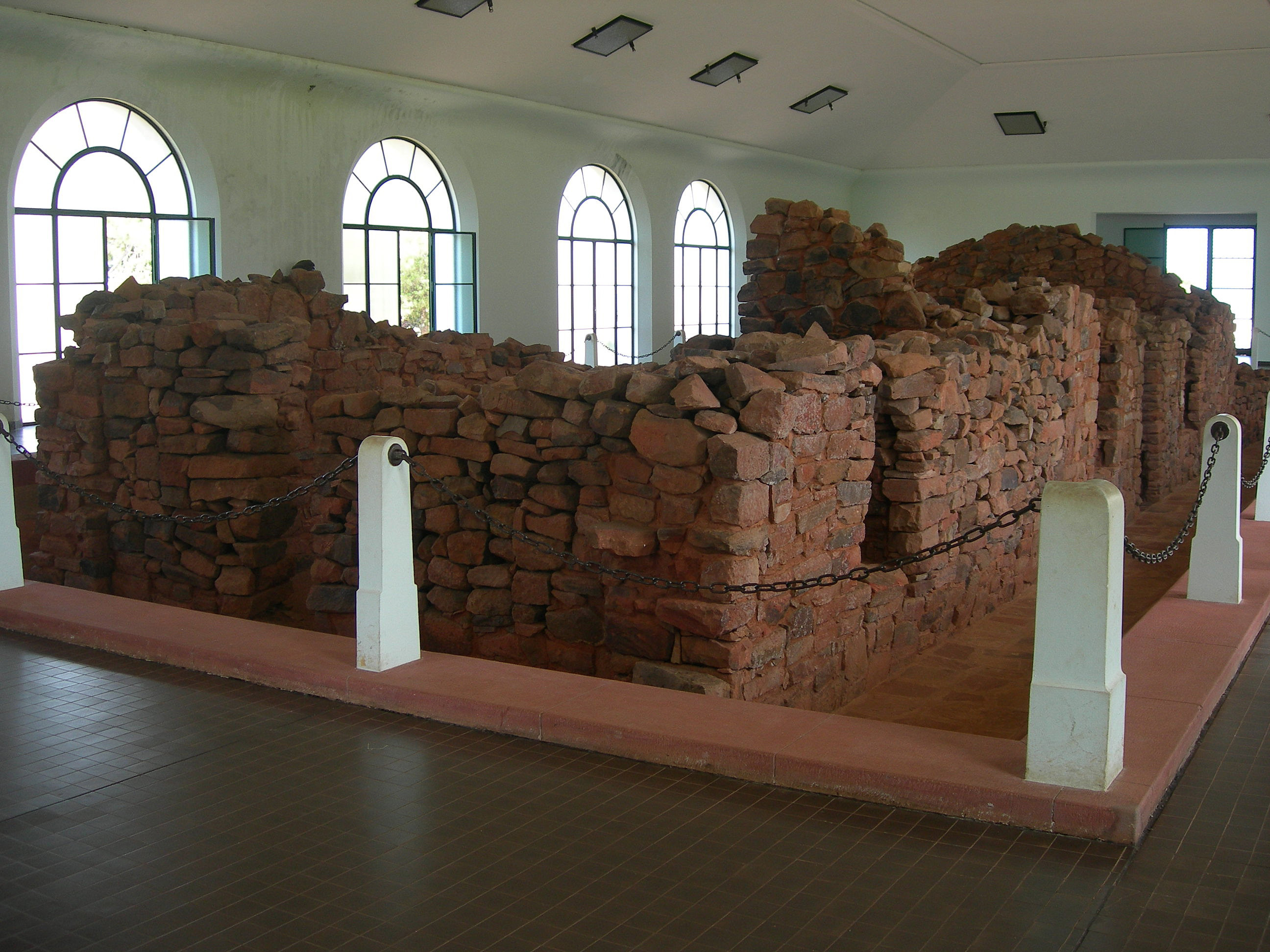
Remains of the original house of San Martín, exhibited in 2009

José Pacífico Otero found the record of the baptism of San Martín's sister, María Elena, dated August 18, 1778. Clearly, the same woman couldn't have given birth to 2 different babies in the same year. However, Otero considers that the year in the document had been falsified, for unknown reasons. Otero considers instead that the correct date was February 25, 1777. He based his reasoning in a number of documents: his passport of 1824, which states an age of 47 years, a private mailing with Ramón Castilla, in 1848, declaring being 71 years old, and the ship "Santa Balbina" that took him to Spain in 1783 gives him an age of 6 years.

Patricia Pasquali wrote the biography "San Martín" in 1999, and considered the date provided by Mitre to be the correct one. She took as evidence an issue of the magazine "Ensayos y Rumbos", from 1921, where Fray Reginaldo de la Cruz Saldaña Retamar published a birth record for San Martín. However, the same historian acknowledges that the original used by Reginaldo to back his claims is unknown.

=== Place of birth ===
Despite the lack of a baptism record to give a definitive confirmation, it is agreed by all sources that San Martín was born at Yapeyú, Corrientes. However, the exact physical location of the house where he lived is uncertain, since Yapeyú had been devastated in 1817 by a Portuguese raid from colonial Brazil. There is a monolith at a location stated to be his home, but the researcher Carlos Zuberbühler asserts that it should have been in Santo Tomé instead.

== Parents ==
His father was Juan de San Martín, a native of Cervatos de la Cueza (province of Palencia), born on February 3, 1728. He served in the military, but couldn't get promoted beyond the rank of captain due to not being of noble origin. He arrived to South America in 1765. José de San Martín's mother was Gregoria Matorras del Ser, a native of Paredes de Nava (province of Palencia), born on March 12, 1738. Juan de San Martín and Gregoria Matorras were married on October 1, 1770, settling in the Banda Oriental (Viceroyalty of the Río de la Plata). They had three children there: María Helena, Manuel Tadeo and Juan Fermín. After Juan was designated governor of Yapeyú in 1774, they relocated there and had their fourth son, Justo Rufino, and finally José Francisco de San Martín.

Juan de San Martín faced many indigenous rebellions, and viceroy Juan José de Vértiz y Salcedo removed him from his charge in 1780. He left Yapeyú in February 1781, and returned to Buenos Aires. As a result, José de San Martín only lived for around three or four years in Yapeyú.

Many people that met San Martín described him as having olive skin and indigenous traits. Some historians like Ricardo Rojas or Pastor Obligado suspected that could have been an illegitimate son of either Juan or Gregoria Matorras with someone else. However, his complexion could also be result of Moorish ancestry in one of them. José Ignacio García Hamilton proposed another explanation: he was the son of Don Diego de Alvear y Ponce de León and Rosa Guarú, an indigenous woman, who would have requested the San Martín family to adopt him as their own son to avoid a scandal. This explanation would explain San Martín's complexion and the lack of a baptism record, but the dates do not support it. Alvear got married in 1782 and visited the zone, but as described earlier, the birth of San Martín took place earlier, at either 1777 or 1778.

== Infancy ==
José Francisco lived his first four years under the combined influences of his Hispanic American family and the local Guaraní population. At home, he would have learned the Spanish language, uses and customs of Spanish heritage and the Catholic religion. Other children of the zone were Guaraní peoples, so he would have learned the Guaraní language as well. Guaraníes had also their own uses, customs and religions, such as the San La Muerte cult. Alonso Piñeiro points out that San Martín would have learned his first reading skills at the school of Yapeyú, but the chance is unlikely as he left the city being just four years old. He also had an indigenous wet nurse named Rosa Guarú, mentioned by local folk songs.

Juan moved to Buenos Aires in 1781, drafted for the Regiment of Spanish volunteers. His house would have been located at the modern Piedras street, between Moreno and Belgrano. José could have been in school at the Santo Domingo Convent, but if he was he would have taken just the first grade, due to his age. Juan was requesting to be moved to a Spanish regiment in the Iberian peninsula, and finally left Buenos Aires with his family in 1783. He took the "Santa Balbina" ship on December 6, and the reports list that, besides both parents, they moved with José Francisco (six years old), María Elena (twelve years old), Manuel Tadeo (eleven years old), Fermín (10 years old), Justo Rufino (eight years old) and Antonio, a family slave. They arrived to Cádiz in March, 1784, and moved to Madrid. The family endured with just 1500 pesos that Juan brought from the Americas, he couldn't get a new military appointment or his unpaid wages. He requested retirement and wages of colonel, citing his 57 years old and 37 years of military service, but he could only get the retirement. Finally, he was destined to Málaga as a supporting officer, with wages of 300 reales per month.

Bartolomé Mitre considers that, during this time, San Martín made studies at the Real seminary of nobles, in Madrid. Otero points that it was unlikely that San Martín could be accepted at a school for nobility when he did not have noble ancestry, but accepts a point suggested by Domingo Faustino Sarmiento: he could have been accepted because of coming from a distinguished, even if not noble, family. However, later investigations dismissed the idea completely. The 1934 director of the National Historical Archive of Spain denied to Luis Enrique Azarola Gil that San Martín had attended that school in the time between 1770 and 1799. He said that "I apologize if this categoric statement may contradict in something the biography of San Martín, but things are like this, and we must stick to the factual things". Besides, the San Martín family stayed in Madrid for a single year, between 1784 and 1785, while Juan expected an answer to his request of retirement or a new military destiny. José María Garante Córdoba considers it unlikely that Juan would send his children to school under such circumstances, and even Juan himself regrets in one of those requests that he could not allow his children to study. Besides, it is completely unlikely that the family would move and leave the infant José alone in Madrid to pursue studies. Spanish historians that studied the life of San Martín at their country consider instead that he made his studies at the free School of Temporalities, in Málaga. But, as he arrived to the city in 1785 and joined the army in 1789, he would not have completed the six-years elementary education.

== Bibliography ==
- Galasso, Norberto (2009). Seamos Libres y lo demás no importa nada. Buenos Aires: Colihue. ISBN 978-950-581-779-5.
