= Guaru =

Guaru may refer to:

- Guarú (Rodrigo Neves de Freitas, born 1981), Brazilian footballer
- Guarú language, an extinct Arawakan language of Colombia
- Rosa Guarú (fl. c. 1780), nurse of Argentine general José de San Martín
