= Military career of José de San Martín in Spain =

Military general

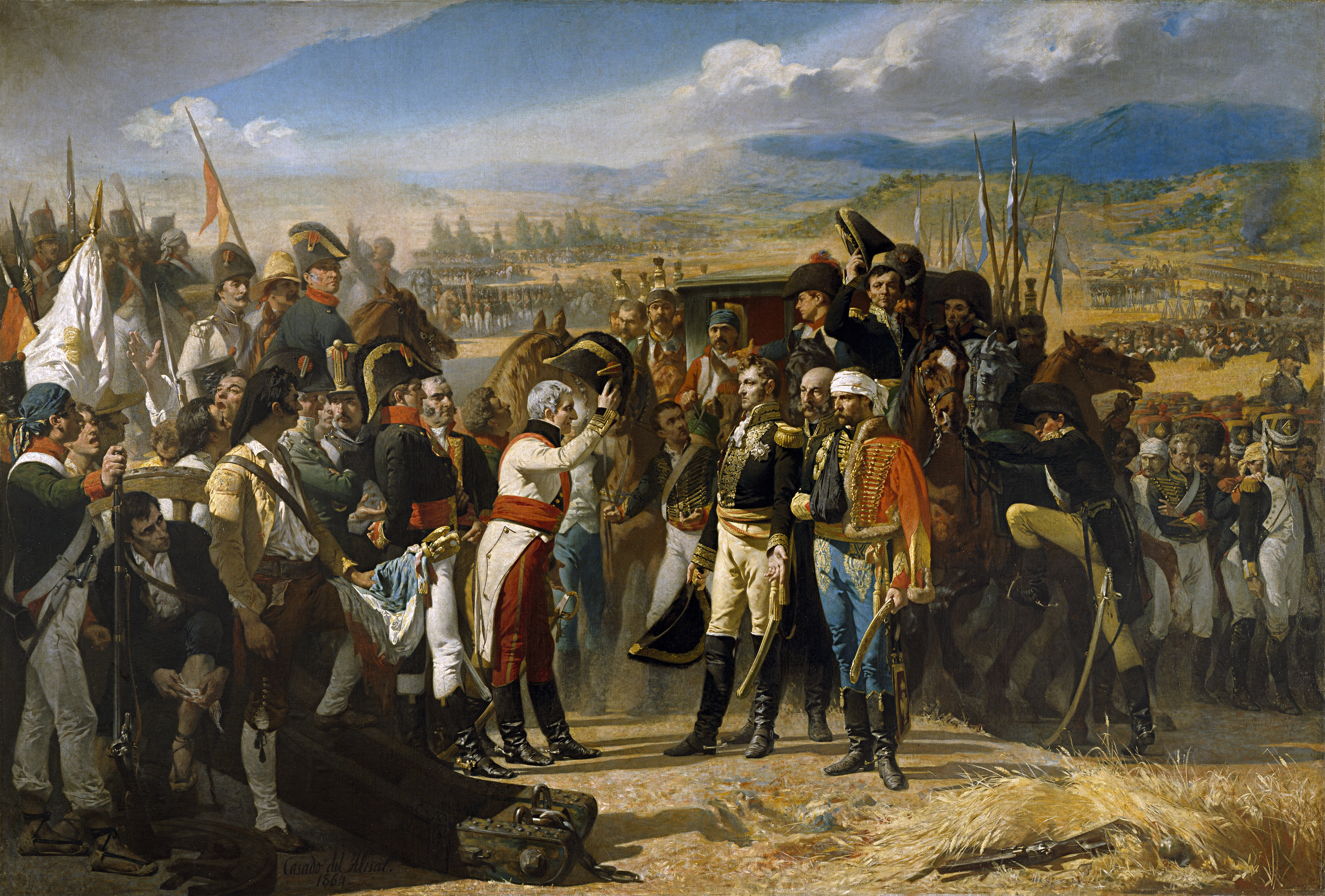
The 1808 Battle of Bailén was one of the most important battles fought by José de San Martín at the Peninsular War. The Surrender of Bailén by José Casado del Alisal, 1864

José de San Martín was an Argentine-born general who moved to Spain during his childhood. He served in the Spanish army from 1789 to 1811. During that time he fought among Spanish forces under siege by Moors, in a naval battle against the British Royal Navy and in the Peninsular War. In 1795 he was promoted to second lieutenant and during the Peninsular War he reached the rank of lieutenant colonel. However, San Martín ended up resigning his position and moved briefly to Britain, and then to Buenos Aires. In 1811, he participated in the Spanish American wars of independence.

== Early life ==
José de San Martín was born in Yapeyú, Corrientes, son of Juan de San Martín and Gregoria Matorras del Ser. The exact year of Martín's birth is unknown, and historians are divided between 1777 and 1778. An officer in the military, Juan de San Martín requested a new deployment, and in 1781, he moved his family from Yapeyu to Buenos Aires. In 1783, the family moved to Madrid, where Juan made several requests for military promotion. In 1785, they moved to Málaga. Three years later, José de San Martín reached the age to join the army.

== First battles ==
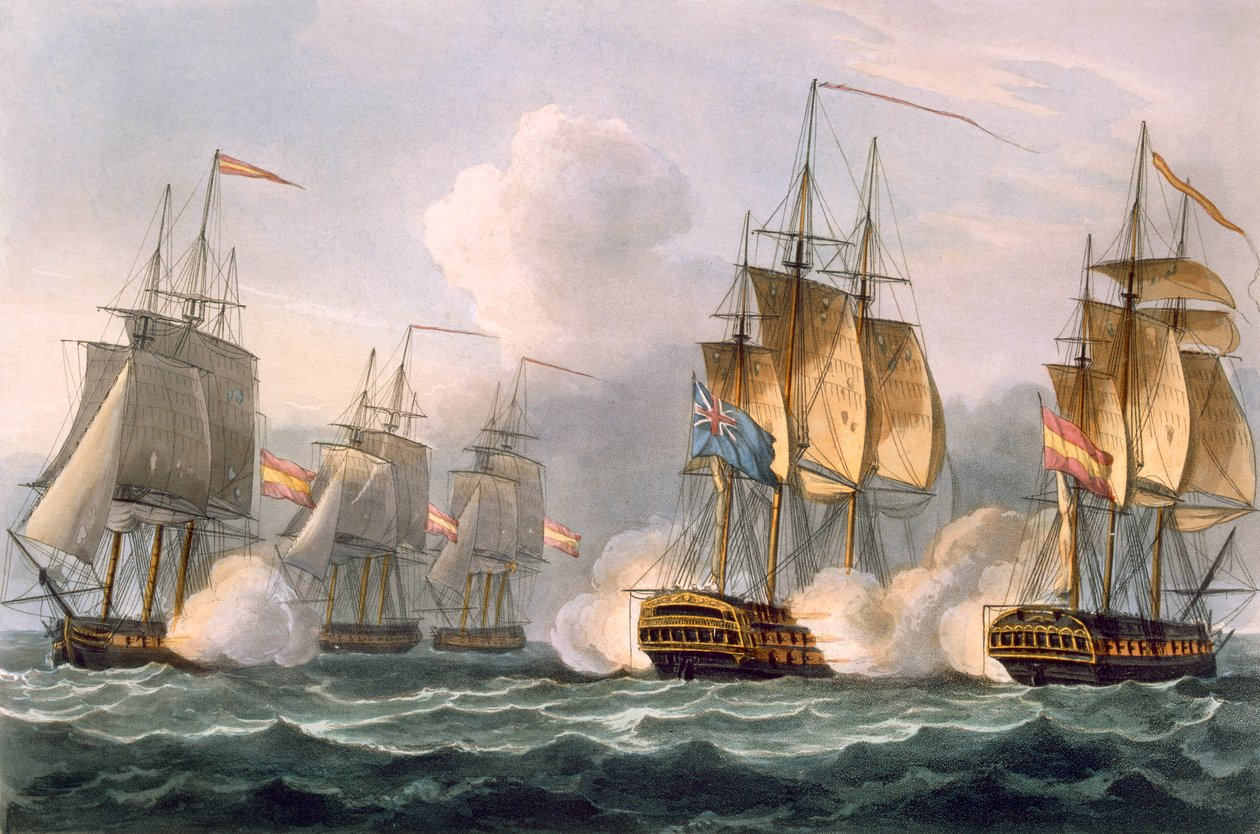
The action of 15 July 1798, during which San Martín was captured by the British

José de San Martín joined Murcia's Infantry Regiment of Line on July 15, 1789. The minimum age to join the army was 16 years old, unless the person was the son of an official. In that case, the minimum age was 12 years old. In his incorporation, he declares being the son of an official, of a Christian family and twelve years old.

He travelled to Melilla in the following year. In June 1791, he was among the Spanish forces under siege by Moors in Orán. The siege lasted for 33 days, and he was promoted to grenadier. In June 1793, he was promoted to second sublieutenant, in July 1794 to first sublieutenant, and in May 1795 to second lieutenant. His father Juan died in 1796, and by that time he had his baptism of fire in a naval battle, against the British Royal Navy. He joined the staff of Santa Dorotea in 1798, disembarking at Toulon. He learned a bit of the French language, and became aware of the French Revolution. Oral tradition says that Napoleon passed review of the Spanish troops, and when he passed near San Martín, he saw his jacket and read "Murcia!" aloud. In the action of 15 July 1798, Santa Dorotea was captured by HMS Lion, and San Martín became a British prisoner of war for a period of time before being exchanged.

The following reports of San Martín are found months later, then fighting against Portugal. He was attacked by thieves on his way from Valladolid to Salamanca, receiving great injures in his chest and throat. He received medical aid in a nearby village.

== Peninsular war ==
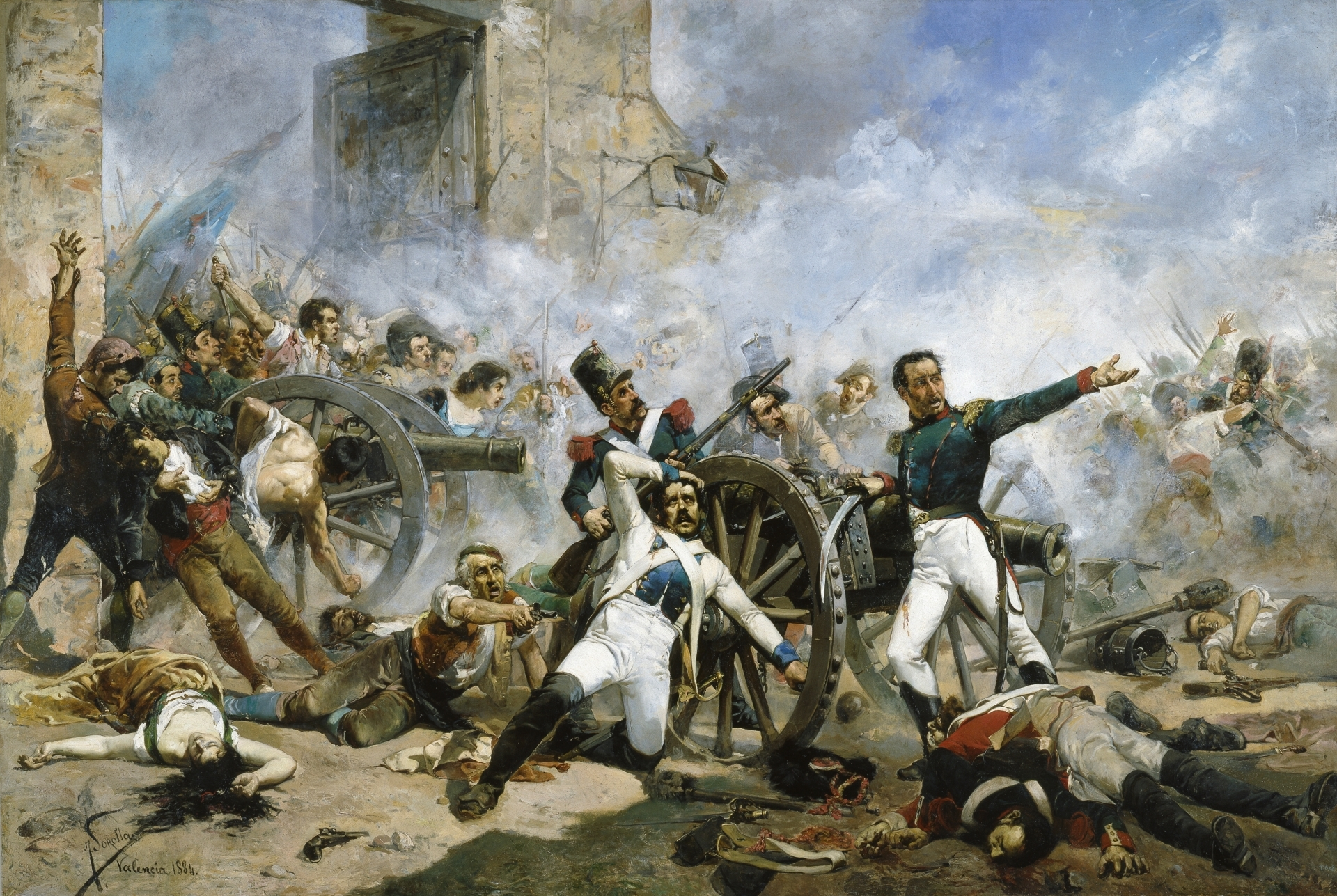
Second of May 1808: Pedro Velarde takes his last stand.

The Spanish monarchy entered crisis during the Abdications of Bayonne, when the Mutiny of Aranjuez forced king Charles IV to abdicate and give the throne to his son, Ferdinand VII. Napoleon Bonaparte, whose troops were in Spain en route to Portugal, forced Ferdinand to abdicate as well, ending Bourbon rule and appointing his brother Joseph Bonaparte as monarch. This was the start of the Peninsular War, the Spanish resistance to the French invasion. Spain was already divided between the enlightenment and the absolutists, but the French invasion divided the ideas even more. The Enlightenment was based in the ideas of the French revolution, but it was the French themselves who were invading the country. The Spanish afrancesados supported the French invasion as a way to remove the absolutist Spanish monarchy and replace it with a liberal monarchy, even if a foreign one. A higher portion of the enlightened Spanish rejected such a perspective, and opposed both the French invasion and an absolutist restoration. San Martín was part of this group.

By this time, San Martín was second to Francisco María Solano Ortiz de Rosas, governor of Andalucía and a close friend. Solano, influenced as well by the enlightenment ideas, had doubts about using his army to back the Dos de Mayo Uprising, even when requested by the Junta of Seville. Some historians consider him an afrancesado, others just hesitant. A popular uprising overran the barracks, killed him and dragged his corpse in the streets. San Martín was nearly killed as well during the uprising. He would keep an image of him for years, because of their friendship, although he fully supported the popular uprising. He would say years later that "even the rocks have risen in Spain to reject the foreign invader."

After those events, San Martín became involved into the democratic revolution that moved across Europe. Cádiz was by then a very active city, with discussions about Jovellanos, Flórez Estrada, the French and British democratic advances, popular intervention in politics, the role of the Juntas and the military leaders. They initiated planned revolutionary steps within lodges, while the war against the French occupation continued. San Martín joined the army of Andalucía, and moved first to Sevilla and then to Jaén. In June 1808, he joined a force combining regiments and militias, organized by Juan de la Cruz Mourgeón, thus learning further ways to wage war beyond the classic military discipline. This would influence him in the future to have a good opinion of Güemes and Artigas. By this time, San Martín was becoming a renowned military leader. Spanish historian Barcia y Trelles considers that San Martín is a new man since May 1808, but this turning point of his life was overlooked by both the Argentine and Spanish historians. Argentine historians talk in little detail about San Martín's military career is Spain, because they were unrelated with the Argentine War of Independence, and the Spanish ones would not be much interested in him because he departed to America in the middle of the war.

San Martín took part in the combat of Arjonilla, being promoted to First Captain for his brave actions. In the battle, a French officer nearly killed him with his sword, but he was saved by Sargeant Juan de Dios, who died in the effort. The following July 19 he took part in the Battle of Bailén, where 14,000 Spanish defeated 10,000 French. San Martín was promoted to lieutenant colonel, and his prestige continued to rise. This victory gave new hopes to the Spanish front, forcing Joseph Bonaparte to leave Madrid and allowing later the liberation of Andalucía. However, San Martín was forced to take a license, because of a pulmonary affection.

He resumed service in Catalonia, under the command of the marquis of Coupigny. He helped Torres Vedras at Portugal, and returned to Cádiz. By this point, San Martín joined the Lodge of Rational Knights. However, Napoleon Bonaparte gave new strength to the French forces, leading them personally, and Joseph returned to Madrid. Despite the Spanish victory at the Battle of Albuera, where San Martín fought next to William Carr Beresford, France prevailed and conquered most of the Iberian Peninsula, with the exception of Cádiz. San Martín would leave the Peninsular War by this point, but the exact nature of his resignation is unknown because it was lost from the Spanish records, and San Martín himself did not keep a copy of it among his documents. He moved briefly to Britain, and then to Buenos Aires.

== Return to South America ==
Arrival of San Martín and Carlos María de Alvear to Buenos Aires, aboard the frigate George Canning

The reasons that San Martín left Spain in 1811 to join the Spanish American wars of independence as a patriot remain contentious among historians. The action would seem contradictory and out of character, because if the patriots were waging an independentist and anti-Hispanic war, then that would turn him into a traitor or deserter. There are a variety of answers and explanations by different historians.

Bartolomé Mitre, one of the earliest historians of San Martín, wrote that "the American criollo had paid with usury his debt to the mother country, joining her during her conflicting days, and could consequently separate himself from her without deserting during an hour of need, leaving her protected by the powerful aegis of Great Britain that guaranteed the definitive triumph under the command of the future victor of Waterloo. Then, he turned his eyes to South America, whose independence he had presaged [...] and decided to return to his distant nation, which he had always loved as a true mother, to offer her his sword and devote her his life". Besides extrapolating future events (the defeat of Napoleon and the independence of South America), Mitre provided a long-standing explanation: San Martín returned because he missed South America, and the war of independence justified changing sides to support it. This perspective was held by mitrist historians, rosist revisionists and socialists. Those groups shared a common perspective about the revolutions and rebellions that took place in the Americas between 1809 and 1811: they considered that they were, from this early stage, separatist wars, intending to create new countries apart from Spain.

Later historians, such as Norberto Galasso, Oriol Anguerra or Rodolfo Terragno, consider this to be unlikely. San Martín was thirty-five years old by then, and left America when just seven years old. He was completely Spanish, and ideas such as "the call of the jungle" or the "telluric forces" have no room in modern psychology to explain a change like this. They consider instead, that the wars in the Americas were not initially separatist, but instead wars between supporters of absolutism and liberalism. This fight took place in both Spain and the Americas, and became independentist when Ferdinand VII returned to the throne and started the absolutist restoration. Under this logic, those historians consider that San Martín's move to the Americas to continue a fight about to be lost in Spain would make complete sense. Other historians like Tulio Halperín Donghi or Ricardo Levene hinted the similarities of both fights, but avoid giving clear or deep explanations in order to avoid a conflict with the Mitrist perspective. Most Spanish historians, with a deeper understanding of the conflicts of the Peninsular War, endorse this point of view. José de San Martín moved to Buenos Aires in the George Canning ship, with other American born generals like Carlos María de Alvear or José Matías Zapiola, but also with Spanish born generals like Francisco Chilavert and Eduardo Kailitz, for whom the "telluric forces" would bear absolutely no value.

There are writings of San Martín that may clarify those reasons, but whose terms allow either interpretation. José Pacífico Otero found a report of a speech of San Martín to his soldiers, where he said that "I knew of the revolution in my country and, when I left my fortunes and my hopes, I only regretted not having anything else to sacrifice to the desire of contributing to the freedom of my country". For the Mitrist perspective, "revolution" and "freedom" mean emancipation from Spain, for the later one, they mean the revolution against the absolutist status quo. Similarly, his resignation as head of the Army of the Andes says "...I had the first news of the general movement at both Americas and that their original purpose was to emancipate themselves from the Peninsular Tyranic Government. [note: with capital letters in the original] From that moment on, I decided to employ my short services to either point that stand insurgent: I preferred to return to my native country where I had been employed at anything within my reach, my nation has rewarded my short services giving me plenty of honours that I do not deserve. Here, San Martín does not talk about emancipation from Spain itself, but from its government, capitaling "tyranic". He also mentions that, even if preferred returning to his native country, he could have been destined to either South or Central America. An 1848 letter to the president of Perú Ramón Castilla says "In a meeting of Americans in Cádiz, knowing about the first steps taken in Caracas, Buenos Aires, etc; we decided to return each one to our native countries, to offer them our services in the struggle that we calculated would be waged soon". This quote is more strange, as it does not mention an ongoing conflict, but a conflict that would be waged soon (but not by then). Such a conflict may be a possible absolutist restoration, which took place when Ferdinand VII returned to the throne, but could also happen if the Regency Council prevailed over the Junta of Seville.

The similarity between San Martín's military campaign and the British Maitland Plan may suggest that San Martín was actually a British agent or spy. This perspective was first proposed by Ricardo Piccirilli in 1957, and supported by Carlos Steffens Soler or J.C.J. Metford. This perspective, however, fails to give an explanation for the hostility between San Martín and the anglophile Bernardino Rivadavia, or his support to Juan Manuel de Rosas during his conflicts with Britain. Patricia Pasquali pointed similar causes but arriving to a different conclusion: San Martín may have moved to South America in order to get higher military promotions, which would be more difficult to get at the Peninsular War. However, the author does not include the promotions (including promotions to national government) that were actually rejected by San Martín in her essay.

== Bibliography ==
- Galasso, Norberto (2009). Seamos Libres y lo demás no importa nada. Buenos Aires: Colihue. ISBN 978-950-581-779-5.
