= Carlotism =

Political movement between 1808 and 1812

Carlotism was a political movement that took place in the Viceroyalty of the Río de la Plata between 1808 and 1812; it intended to make Carlota Joaquina, Infanta of Spain and Queen Consort of Portugal, its monarch.

After Napoleon's invasion of Spain, Fernando VII, Carlota's younger brother, was forced to abdicate and give the throne to Joseph Bonaparte. Most Spanish did not consider him a legitimate king and Carlota, an ambitious woman, seemed like a possible option to keep the royal line safe.

Carlota was living in Brazil by then, after the nobility of Portugal moved from Portugal to the Americas because of Napoleón's invasion of Portugal.

Carlotism found strong resistance from many parties involved: the viceroys, other Spanish authorities in the Americas, part of the Criollos, and the British. The plans were never applied, and supporters of it would later turn to independence.

== Development of the proposal ==
In 1808, British Admiral Sir Sydney Smith, concerned with the danger of French influence in South America, tried to convince Sebastián's father, Prince Don Pedro Carlos, to accept a joint regency with his future mother-in-law and aunt Dona Carlota Joaquina (herself a Spanish Bourbon and wife of João VI), under the name of the then-captive Spanish king. Carlota eagerly supported the plan hoping that she could rule the former Spanish colonies through her nephew. Saturnino José Rodríguez Peña and Manuel Belgrano also extended this offer to Carlota from Buenos Aires.

Although then-crown prince João had earlier considered establishing a court for Pedro Carlos in Buenos Aires or another Spanish viceroyalty to counter French influence, he now saw Carlota's ambitious plan as a threat to Portugal and Brazil and convinced his nephew to refuse the proposal. Nonetheless Carlota was adamant on leaving Rio de Janeiro to establish herself as regent with her younger son Miguel as her heir. In May 1809 her husband managed to destroy her project by sending away Percy Smythe, 6th Viscount Strangford, the British Admiral who supported her would take her to Buenos Aires on his fleet. In 1810 the Buenos Aires junta, in conflict with the government of Cádiz, proposed Carlota as constitutional queen of the United Provinces (nowadays Argentina). She wanted to rule as an absolutist monarch which led to Buenos Aires to withdraw its proposal.

== Similar proposals ==
In 1816, representatives of Buenos Aires - who disliked the idea of losing power and being governed by a distant central government in Cusco under the Inca plan - proposed instead as a monarch the young Prince Don Sebastián, grandson of Carlota.

In 1819 the Congress enacted instead an aristocratic Constitution and a monarchy as well, but the king would be the prince of Lucca (Charles II, Duke of Parma) The crowning of Charles was frustrated by the defeat of Buenos Aires during the battle of Cepeda, which ended the authority of the Supreme Directors and started a period of anarchy. The Prince of Lucca was a Bourbon related to the Spanish king; the French premiers Richelieu and Desolle supported the plan to disrupt British activities in the region. This plan came after Belgrano's proposal to crown Infante Francisco de Paula of Spain, brother of King Ferdinand, had fallen through and King Louis XVIII of France had vetoed Rivadavia's plan to have Louis Philippe, Duke of Orleans invited as king.

== See also ==
- Carlota Joaquina of Spain

== Bibliography ==
- Calmon, Pedro. História de D. Pedro II. 5 v. Rio de Janeiro: J. Olympio, 1975. (in Portuguese)
- Macaulay, Neill. Dom Pedro I: a luta pela liberdade no Brasil e em Portugal, 1798-1834. Rio de Janeiro: Record, 1993. ISBN 8501038652 (in Portuguese)
  - Dom Pedro: the struggle for liberty in Brazil and Portugal, 1798–1834 (1986, ISBN 978-0-8223-0681-8)
