= Saturnino José Rodríguez Peña =

Argentine soldier

Saturnino José Rodríguez Peña (January 19, 1765 – April 22, 1819) was a 19th-century Argentine soldier. He fought at the British invasions of the Río de la Plata and supported the Carlotist project. He supported national independence before the start of the Argentine War of Independence.
