= Historia de San Martín y de la emancipación sudamericana =

1887 biography by Bartolomé Mitre

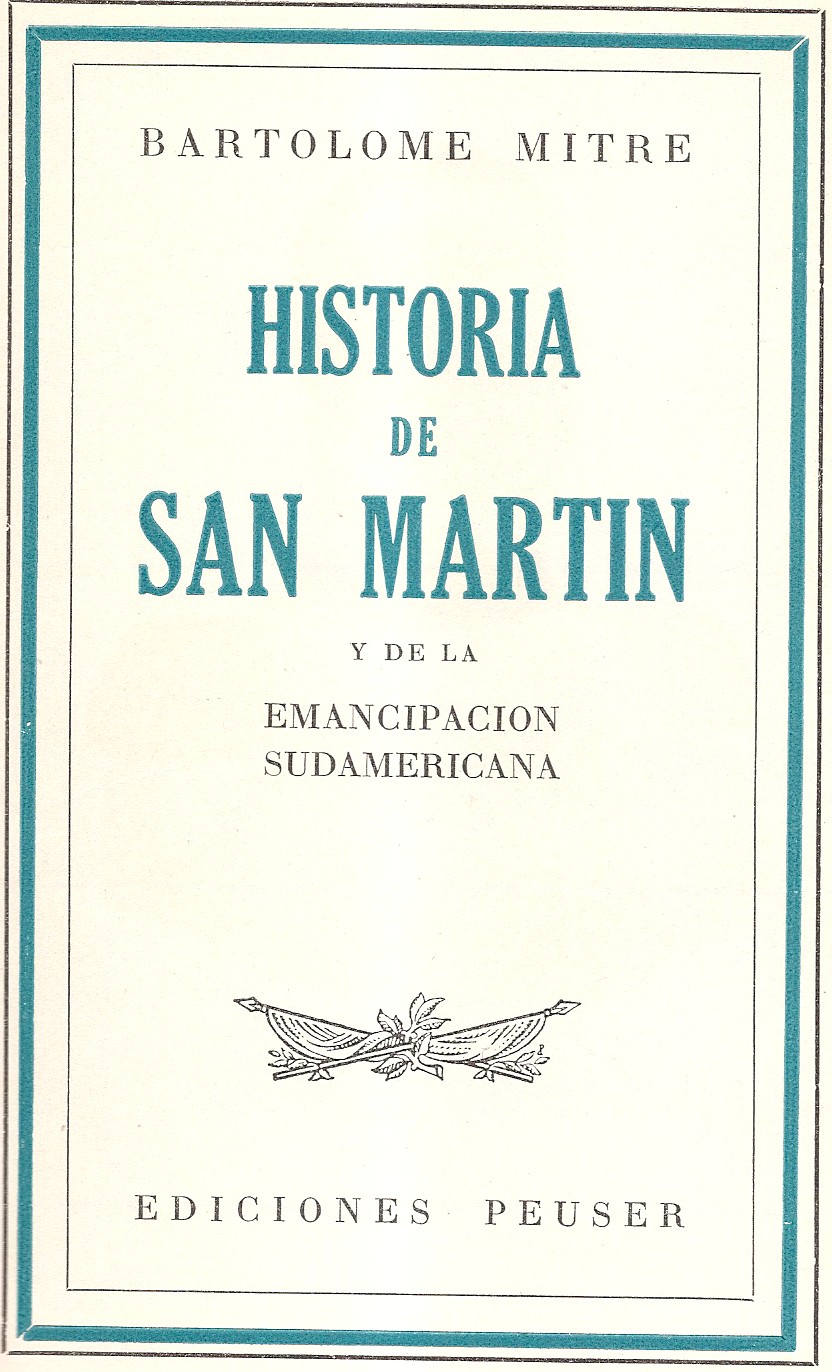
- Author: Bartolomé Mitre
- Language: Spanish
- Subject: José de San Martín
- Genre: Biography
- Publisher: Ediciones Peuser
- Publication date: 1887
- Publication place: Argentina
- Preceded by: Historia de Belgrano y de la Independencia Argentina

Historia de San Martín y de la emancipación sudamericana (English: History of San Martín and the South American emancipation) is a biography of José de San Martín, written by Bartolomé Mitre in 1869. Along with his biography of Manuel Belgrano, it is one of the earliest major works of the historiography of Argentina.

== Context ==
During the second half of the 19th century, Argentina had left behind the War of Independence and the most harsh times of the civil war, and began to strengthen its culture. One of the pending issues was to define the Father of the Nation, which was faced by Bartolomé Mitre. The first one thus defined was Bernardino Rivadavia, who served briefly as President of Argentina in 1826. The policies implemented by Rivadavia back then were similar to those implemented by the current governments.

However, Rivadavia was a statesman without a military career. Mitre sought to create a military Father of the Nation, to complement Rivadavia, and wrote Historia de Belgrano y de la Independencia Argentina, a biography of Manuel Belgrano. This attempt did not prove completely effective, as Belgrano had provided the key victories at the battles of Tucumán and Salta, but was defeated in the Paraguay campaign and the whole second Upper Peru campaign.

== The book ==
Mitre began to work on the biography of San Martín right after ending his presidency. He wrote his initial project to Mariano Balcarce: he wanted to write two books, History of San Martín from 1812 to 1822, from San Martín's arrival to Buenos Aires to the Guayaquil conference, and The Ostracism and Apotheosis of General San Martín, with his life afterwards. Balcarce sent him the personal documents of San Martín in Europe for his work.

However, unlike the case of Rivadavia, San Martín's support to the Latin American integration contradicted the strong centralism of the government party. As a result, the biography modified details about his biography. The Spanish American wars of independence are not treated as a continent-wide revolution, but merely as an Argentine revolution that extends freedom to Chile and Peru. Simón Bolívar is portrayed instead as a conqueror, annexing the new free countries into an artificial unity. The war is described to be separatist from the beginning, and encouraged and supported by Britain. However, in the specific case of San Martín this scenario could seem contradictory, as he had left America as a child and served for the Spanish army for 22 years. As a result, his military career in Spain is summarized in six pages (the whole book has more than six hundred), giving very little detail about him before his arrival to Buenos Aires. As for the reason for his departure from the Spanish army to join the South American ones, the book describes that "he decided to return to his distant nation, which he had always loved as a true mother, to offer her his sword and devote her his life". Meaning, that his first six years living in America shaped his personality more than the twenty eight he had lived till then in Spain. This point generated controversy among historians.

The second projected volume, with the life of San Martín after his military career, was never written. Historian Norberto Galasso considers that his late life was full of events that would contradict the portrait of San Martín by Mitre: his rivalry with Rivadavia, his rejection of the execution of Manuel Dorrego and his conflict with Juan Lavalle, his support to Juan Manuel de Rosas (including the gift of his sword), and his repudiation to the French and Anglo-French blockades and the role of the unitarians in them.

The book was finally edited in 1887.

== Bibliography ==
- Galasso, Norberto (2009). Seamos Libres y lo demás no importa nada (in Spanish). Buenos Aires: Colihue. ISBN 978-950-581-779-5.
- Mitre, Bartolomé (1952). Historia de San Martín y de la emancipación sudamericana (in Spanish). Buenos Aires: Peuser.
- Shumway, Nicolas (1991). The Invention of Argentina. Berkeley and Los Angeles, California: University of California Press. ISBN 0-520-08284-2.
