= Cervatos de la Cueza =

Human settlement

- municipality
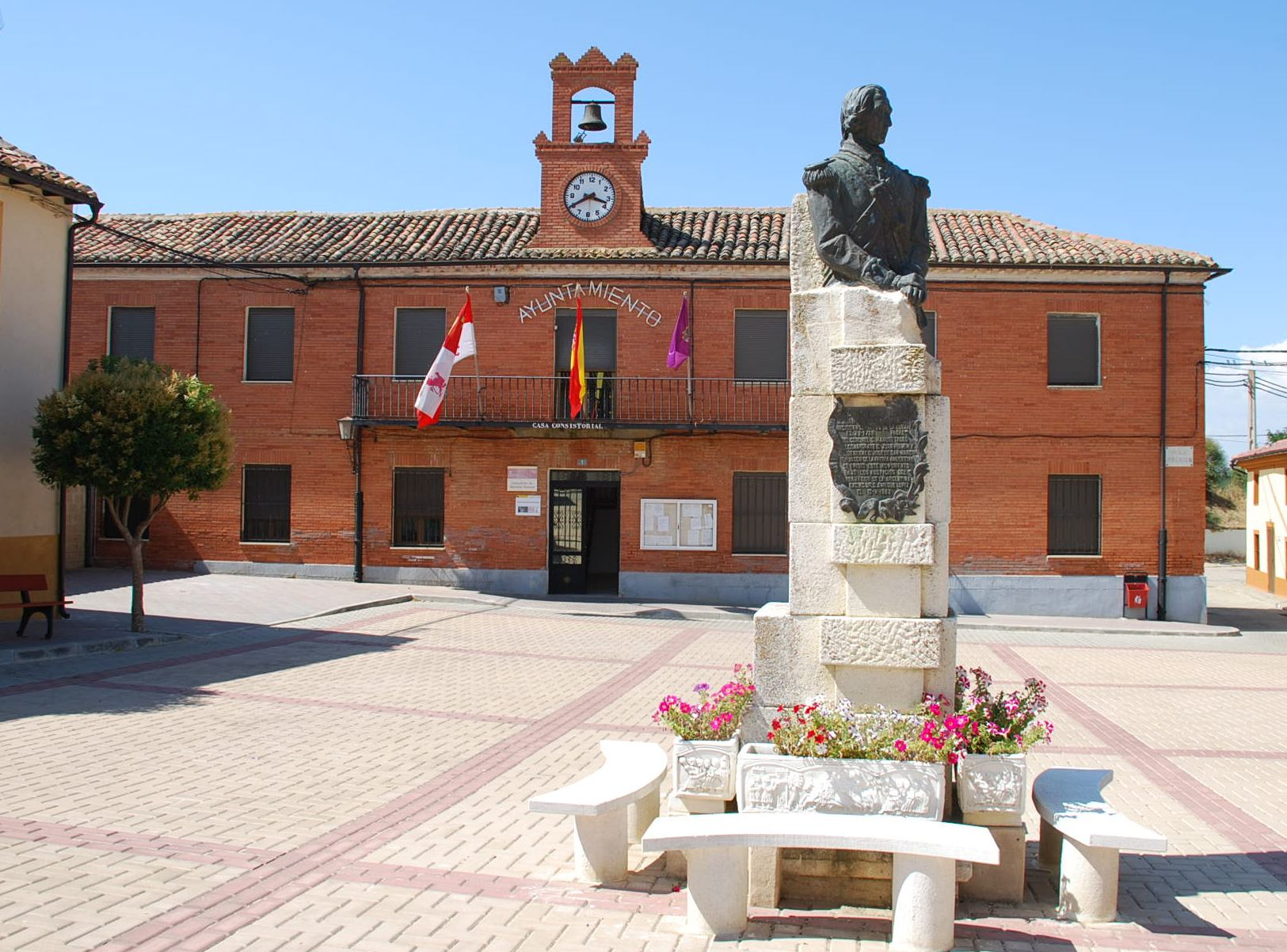

- Flag Coat of arms

- Location in Spain.
- Coordinates: 42°17′26″N 4°46′11″W
- Country: Spain
- Autonomous community: Castile and León
- Province: Palencia
- Municipality: Cervatos de la Cueza

Area
  - Total: 71.46 km^{2} (27.59 sq mi)
- Elevation: 849 m (2,785 ft)

Population (2025-01-01)
  - Total: 241
  - Density: 3.37/km^{2} (8.73/sq mi)
- Time zone: UTC+1 (CET)
  - Summer (DST): UTC+2 (CEST)
- Website: Official website

Cervatos de la Cueza is a municipality located in the province of Palencia, Castile and León, Spain. According to the censuses (INE) since 1900, the population has continued to decline. In 1900 a population of 808 inhabitants was reported, falling to 397 in 2000, and most recently being reported at 262 inhabitants in 2018.

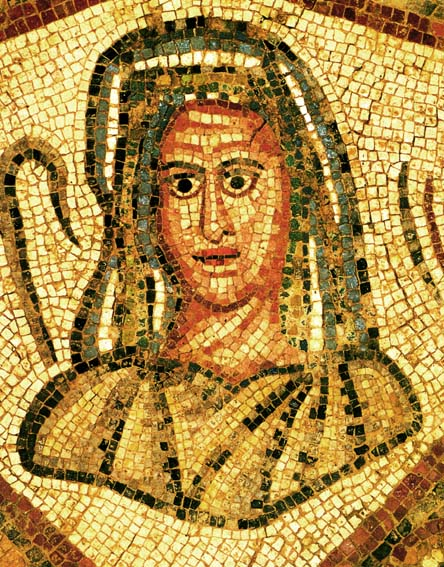
A mosaic from 'Archaeological site of the Roman village of Tejada', in Quintanilla de la Cueza (Cervatos de la Cueza).
