= Patricia Pasquali =

Argentine historian and writer

Patricia Pasquali (1961–2008) was an Argentine historian and writer. She was part of a movement to reevaluate San Martín's role in the independence movements of the early 19th century.

== Works ==
In addition to numerous articles in scientific journals in the area of its competence and others, published eleven books, her first book was San Martín in ostracism (Prize "Argentina" of the National Academy of History).

- The teaching of history in Argentina (2005), ZULETA ALVAREZ, E., FERNÁNDEZ LATOUR boots, O., MAY, C., Patricia PASQUALI San Martin (2004)
- The liberal establishment. Urquiza, Mitre and statesman forgotten: Nicasio Orono (2003)
- San Martín. The man and his mission. Versions of a story (2002)
- The teaching of history in Argentina (2000), ZULETA ALVAREZ, E., FERNÁNDEZ LATOUR boots, O., MAY, C., Patricia PASQUALI
- San Martín confidential. Liberator's personal correspondence with his friend Tomás Guido (1816–1849) (2000)
- Bernardino Rivadavia. Man of Buenos Aires, city argentino.1 ed. Buenos Aires: Planet (1999) Segreti, CSA, Patricia PASQUALI San Martín.
- The strength of the mission and the loneliness of Glory (1999)
- J. Daniel Infante (1996)
- Juan Lavalle. A warrior in times of revolution and dictatorship (1996)
- San Martín in ostracism: prophecy, silence and Glory (1992)

== Death ==
Patricia Pasquali died at age 47. Her remains are in Rosario.
