= Norberto Galasso =

Argentine historian (1936–2026)

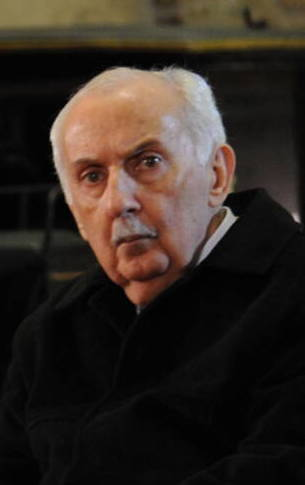
Norberto Galasso

Norberto Galasso (28 July 1936 – 7 September 2026) was an Argentine historian and essayist, who wrote numerous books related to the history of Argentina. His career as a historian spanned nearly 40 years.

Galasso studied economics at the University of Buenos Aires, graduating in 1961.

In his book Los Malditos (Spanish for "The cursed ones") he analyzed the history of some people usually being relegated to a second plane by other historians, such as Manuel Ugarte, Arturo Jauretche and Raúl Scalabrini Ortiz.

Galasso died on 7 September 2026, at the age of 90.

== Bibliography ==
- Norberto Galasso (2005). Perón: Formación, ascenso y caída, 1893-1955. Vol. One. Ediciones Colihue SRL. ISBN 978-950-581-399-5.
- Norberto Galasso (2005). Perón: Exilio, resistencia, retorno y muerte, 1955-1974. Vol. Two. Ediciones Colihue SRL. ISBN 978-950-581-400-8.
- Norberto Galasso (2005). Los malditos: hombres y mujeres excluídos de la historia oficial de los argentinos. Ediciones Madres de Plaza de Mayo. ISBN 978-987-1231-41-6.
