= Miguel de Azcuénaga =

Argentine army officer and politician (1754–1833)

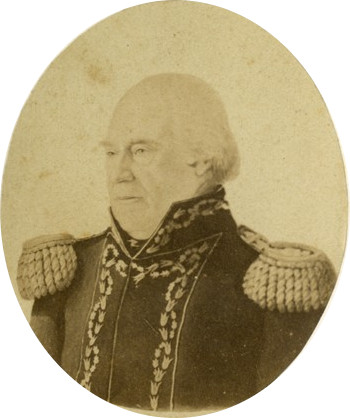

Voting Member of the Primera Junta
- In office 25 May 1810 – 6 April 1811 Serving with Manuel Alberti, Manuel Belgrano, Juan José Castelli, Juan Larrea, Domingo Matheu

Personal details
- Born: June 4, 1754 Buenos Aires, Viceroyalty of Peru, Spanish Empire
- Died: December 19, 1833 (aged 79) Buenos Aires, Buenos Aires Province, Argentine Confederation
- Resting place: La Recoleta Cemetery
- Party: Patriot
- Spouse: Justa Rufina de Basavilbaso y Garfias
- Education: University of Seville
- Profession: Military
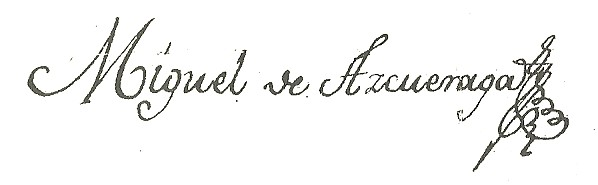
- Signature

Military service
- Allegiance: Viceroyalty of the Río de la Plata, United Provinces of the Río de la Plata
- Years of service: 1774–1832
- Rank: Brigadier
- Battles/wars: British invasions of the River Plate

Brigadier Miguel de Azcuénaga (4 June 1754 – 19 December 1833) was an Argentine army officer and politician. Educated in Spain, at the University of Seville, Azcuénaga began his military career in the Viceroyalty of the Río de la Plata and became a member of the Primera Junta, the first autonomous government of modern Argentina. He was shortly exiled because of his support to the minister Mariano Moreno, and returned to Buenos Aires when the First Triumvirate replaced the Junta. He held several offices since then, most notably being the first Governor intendant of Buenos Aires after the May Revolution. He died at his country house (the modern Quinta de Olivos) in 1833.

== Biography ==
=== Viceroyalty of the Río de la Plata ===
Miguel de Azcuénaga was born in Buenos Aires on 4 June 1754. He was the son of Vicente de Azcuénaga Iturbe, a Spanish businessman from the Basque province of Biscay, and María Rosa de Basavilbaso y Urtubia, from Buenos Aires. The Azcuénaga-Basavilbaso had 4 sons and 3 daughters. Miguel de Azcuénaga was sent to Spain at an early age, to complete his elementary studies in Málaga and then attend the University of Seville. He returned to Buenos Aires in 1774, and made a new journey to Spain to oversee the business of his father.

He began his military career in the artillery of Buenos Aires, during the Spanish–Portuguese War, staying in that unit until the signing of the First Treaty of San Ildefonso that incorporated the Banda Oriental to the Viceroyalty of the Río de la Plata. With the war concluded, he became a regidor of the Buenos Aires Cabildo. He took the arms again in 1778, during an attack of the natives, and directed the operations at the fort in San Miguel del Monte. As Spain was fighting in the American Revolutionary War against Great Britain, it was thought that the British might launch an offensive against Spanish American. Azcuénaga commanded an artillery unit withfour4 cannons in 1781, but no British attack took place.

He was appointed to several offices within the Buenos Aires Cabildo in the 1781-1794 period. On 7 April 1789, he helped a number of shoemakers to establish a guild. Although there were several in Spain, no guild constitution from Spain was used as a model. He promoted the pavement of the streets, and the improvement of the buildings. Supported by the viceroy Nicolás Antonio de Arredondo, he collected $8,000 and provided 500 cattle to mine rocks from the Martín García Island for this work. He married his cousin Justa Rufina de Basavilbaso y Garfias on 6 February 1795.

He was appointed lieutenant colonel in 1796, leading a local militia from that year to 1802. When he left, he granted all his military wages from that period to the soldiers of his unit. He was appointed colonel on 24 March 1802, and donated $2,435 for the clothing of the soldiers. He further donated $1,000,000 to build a navy, along with Juan Larrea and Domingo Matheu. He fought in the first British invasion of the River Plate in 1806, overseeing a last stand on the Gálvez bridge. His men managed to hold their position for 20 hours with only 400 soldiers against a much larger British force. He eventually was forced to withdraw with only 50 remaining soldiers, and proceeded to join forces with the brigadier Hilarión de la Quintana.

=== Argentine War of Independence ===
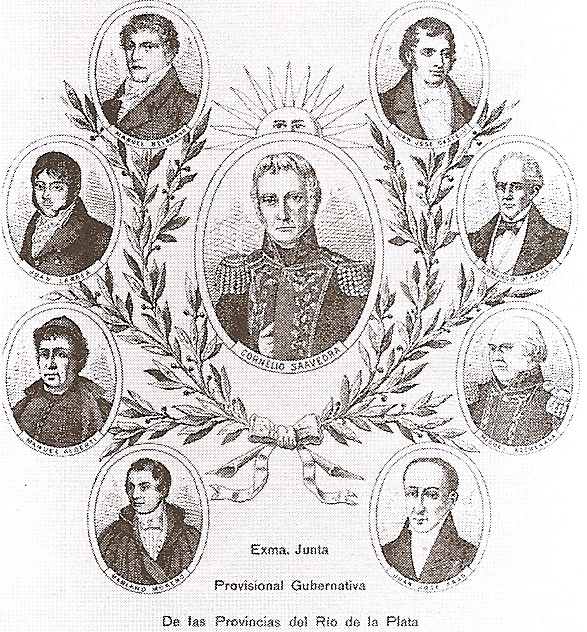
Lithograph of the members of the Primera Junta

The Peninsular War in Spain, along with the capture of the king Ferdinand VII and the fall of the Junta of Seville, escalated political disputes in Buenos Aires that led to the May Revolution. Several criollos thought that the viceroy Baltasar Hidalgo de Cisneros, appointed by the fallen Junta, did not have legitimacy, and requested an open cabildo to discuss it. Azcuénaga attended it, and voted for the creation of a Junta with deputies from all the provinces, with the Cabildo ruling in the interregnum. However, the majority agreed with the creation of a junta, but with another junta of people from Buenos Aires ruling in the meantime. The viceroy tried to stay in government as president of the Junta, which was resisted by the criollos. Azcuénaga lend his house to their secret meetings. Azcuénaga was appointed as a member of the new Primera Junta, and promoted to brigadier. The reasons of Azcuénaga's inclusion in the Junta are unclear, as with all its members. A common accepted theory considers it to be a balance between Carlotists, Alzaguists, the military and the clergy; besides being from the armed forces, Azcuénaga had close ties with the rich people of the city.

The Junta suffered from internal conflicts between the conservatives (led by Cornelio Saavedra) and the liberals (led by Mariano Moreno). Azcuénaga was aligned with Moreno. Although he opposed the expansion of the Junta into the Junta Grande, he voted for the proposal, perhaps under pressure of Saavedra. Mariano Moreno resigned in December, and all his supporters were forced to resign in May 1811. Azcuénaga was exiled to the Mendoza Province, and lost his military rank. His wife requested instead an exile to the closer Luján, which was declined. The Junta was replaced by the First Triumvirate. Azcuénaga still had a positive image among his peers, and the political change allowed his return and the restitution of his rank. However, a mistake with the documentation gave him only the rank of colonel; he could only retrieve his rank of brigadier in 1814. He was appointed Governor intendant of Buenos Aires (ruling over the province, whereas the Triumvirate had a national authority).

The Assembly of the Year XIII replaced the Triumvirate with a unipersonal head of state, the Supreme Director of the United Provinces of the Río de la Plata. Gervasio Antonio de Posadas was appointed Supreme Director, and Azcuénaga selected as one of his five advisors. In 1816 the Cabildo appointed him as protector of the freedom of the press. He became a member of the Congress of Tucumán in 1818, when it was moved from San Miguel de Tucumán to Buenos Aires. He was elected vice-president of the Congress in September and reelected in May 1819. The defeat of Buenos Aires in 1820 at the Battle of Cepeda, part of the Argentine Civil Wars, led to the closing of the Congress.

Like many other nineteenth century Argentines prominent in public life, Azcuénaga was a freemason.

=== Later life ===
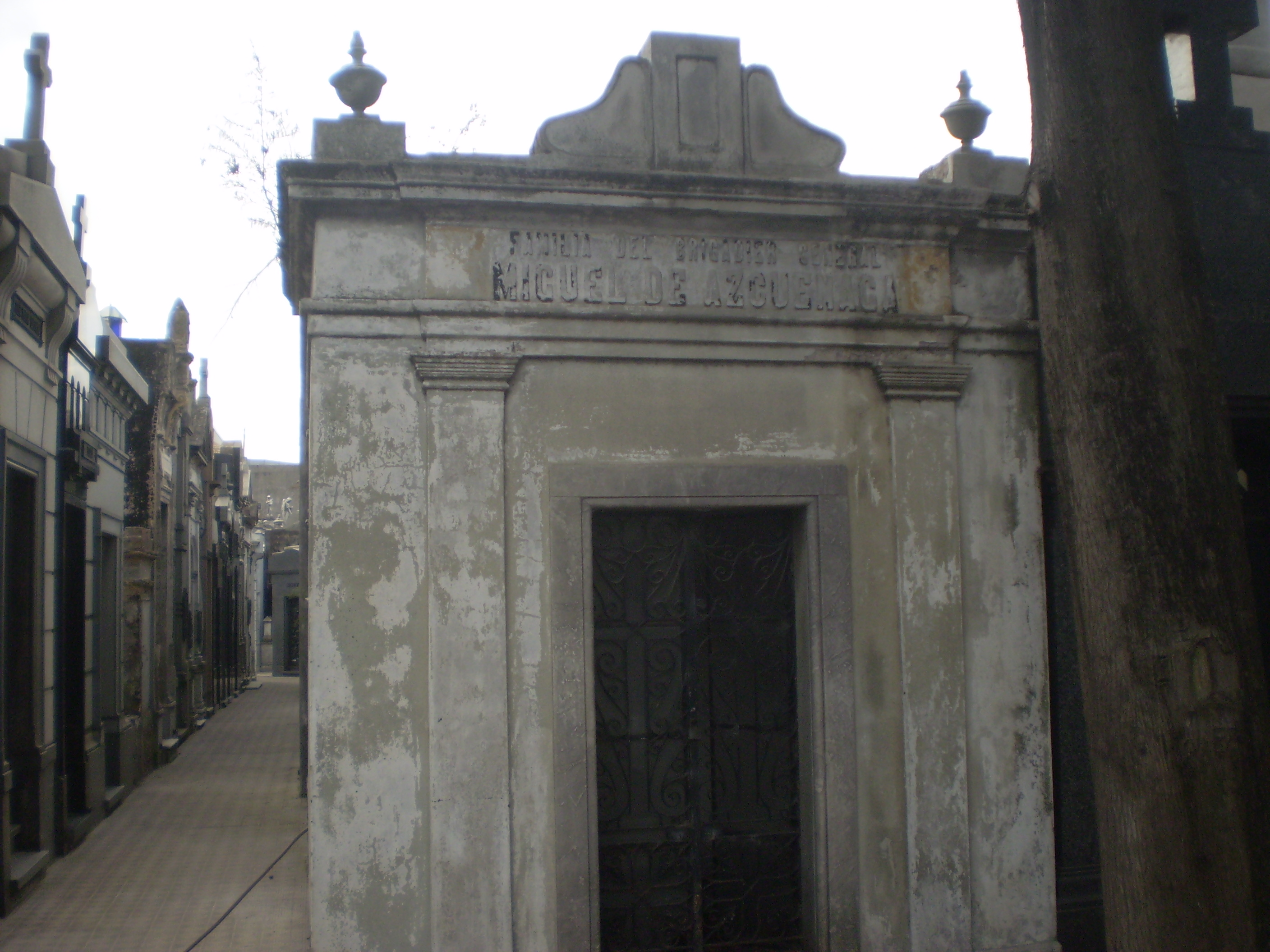
Cenotaph of Azcuénaga at the La Recoleta Cemetery

In 1828, aged 74, he took part in the peace negotiations with the Empire of Brazil after the end of the Argentine-Brazilian War, which led to the creation of the state of Uruguay. Those negotiations took place in Montevideo. He managed the economy in 1829 and 1830, and became a deputy in 1831 and 1832. His fellow deputies pointed out that he attended all the legislative sessions, despite his old age.

Azcuénaga died at his home on 19 December 1833. The governor Juan José Viamonte ordered the construction of a cenotaph at the Northern Cemetery (modern La Recoleta Cemetery), which is still in place today. The official decree stated that "the noteworthy services he gave to the nation at all times the brigadier general Miguel de Azcuénaga, and particularly in the days of the glorious independence, require a demonstration that takes to posterity the name of this patriot, and keeps the memory of his civic virtues".

Azcuénaga's country house was built during the establishment of Buenos Aires in 1580 by Juan de Garay. After several generations it was inherited by Justa Rufina Basavilbaso, Azcuénaga's wife. Further generations of the family (with ancestry of the viceroy Antonio de Olaguer y Feliú as well) inherited it, until Carlos Villate Olaguer gave it to the Argentine state in 1913, to be used as an official residence of the President of Argentina. It was renamed as Quinta de Olivos, and it was used by all Argentine presidents since Agustín Pedro Justo.

== Bibliography ==
- Abad de Santillán, Diego. Historia Argentina (in Spanish). Buenos Aires: TEA (Tipográfica Editora Argentina).
- Galasso, Norberto (2004). Mariano Moreno – El sabiecito del sur. Buenos Aires: Colihue. ISBN 950-581-799-1.
- Johnson, Lyman (2011). Workshop of Revolution: Plebeian Buenos Aires and the Atlantic World, 1776–1810. United States: Duke University Press. ISBN 978-082-234-981-5.
- López, Vicente (1966). La gran semana de 1810 [The great week of 1810] (in Spanish). Argentina: Librería del colegio (sic).
- Luna, Félix (2003). La independencia argentina y americana (in Spanish). Buenos Aires: Planeta. ISBN 950-49-1110-2.
- National Academy of History of Argentina (2010). Revolución en el Plata (in Spanish). Buenos Aires: Emece. ISBN 978-950-04-3258-0.
- Scenna, Miguel Ángel (2009). Mariano Moreno. Buenos Aires: H. Garetto Editor. ISBN 978-987-1494-05-4.
