= Juan Larrea (politician) =

Argentine politician

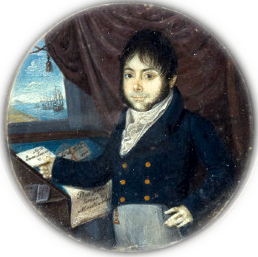
- Portrait of Juan Larrea, writing a plan to capture the city of Montevideo

Committee member of the Primera Junta
- In office 25 May 1810 – 6 April 1811 Serving with Manuel Alberti, Miguel de Azcuénaga, Manuel Belgrano, Juan José Castelli, Domingo Matheu

Personal details
- Born: 24 June 1782 Mataró, Catalonia, Spain
- Died: 20 June 1847 (aged 64) Buenos Aires, Buenos Aires Province, Argentine Confederation
- Party: Patriot
- Other political affiliations: Morenist
- Occupation: Merchant
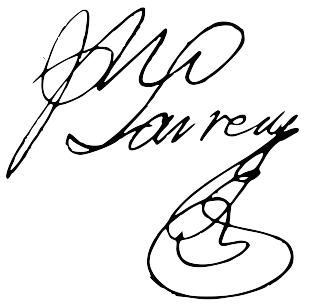
- Signature

Military service
- Allegiance: Viceroyalty of the Río de la Plata
- Rank: Captain
- Unit: Legion of Catalan volunteers
- Battles/wars: British invasions of the Río de la Plata

Juan Larrea (24 June 1782 – 20 June 1847) was a Spanish businessman and politician in Buenos Aires during the early nineteenth century. He headed a military unit during the second British invasion of the River Plate, and worked at the Buenos Aires Cabildo. He took part in the ill-fated Mutiny of Álzaga. Larrea and Domingo Matheu were the only two Spanish-born members of the Primera Junta, the first national government of Argentina.

He supported the secretary Mariano Moreno within the Junta, and was moved to the distant city of San Juan when the Morenists were removed from government. He returned as a deputy for Córdoba in the Assembly of Year XIII constituent assembly, promoting many resolutions. Together with Carlos María de Alvear, he organized the strategy for the downfall of the royalist stronghold in Montevideo, a threat to Buenos Aires during the Argentine War of Independence. Despite the victory, he faced political conflicts with admiral William Brown and an economic crisis, and was exiled from the country.

He moved to Bordeaux, France, but returned to Buenos Aires when his exile was lifted by the Oblivion law. He served as consul for a time, but his business declined and he committed suicide on 20 June 1847. He was the last surviving member of the Primera Junta.

== Biography ==
=== Early life and Viceroyalty ===
Juan Larrea was born on 24 June 1782, in the city of Mataró, Catalonia. His father was Martín Ramón de Larrea, who was in charge of customs operations in Mataró, and his mother was Tomasa Espeso. He studied mathematics and navigation, and focused his education towards a career in commerce. His father died in 1793, so Larrea became the patriarch of the family. They moved to Buenos Aires, where he established a warehouse for wines, leather, and sugar. He traded with Peru, Upper Peru, Paraguay, Chile and colonial Brazil. By 1806 he was a well-respected businessman, and a syndic of the Royal Consulate. He promoted the role of deputies from Buenos Aires at the Madrid court, to better the representation of the Brazilian viceroyalty and reduce the privileges of peninsular merchants.

Buenos Aires and other nearby cities were involved in the British invasions of the River Plate in 1806 and 1807. In the absence of reinforcements from Spain, viceroy Santiago de Liniers arranged that everyone in Buenos Aires capable of bearing arms should join the resistance against the second invasion. Larrea established the Legion of Catalan Volunteers with Jaime Nadal y Guarda, Jaime Lavallol and José Olaguer Reynals. Larrea was appointed captain of this military unit. The defense was successful, and the British were eventually forced to surrender and evacuate the viceroyalty.

Larrea's business prospered, and in 1808 the Buenos Aires Cabildo appointed him to oversee a naval patrol to suppress shipments of contraband. This gave him an opportunity to put his nautical skills to use. He also participated in the secret meetings of patriots who promoted political change, and joined the 1809 Mutiny of Álzaga, which attempted to depose viceroy Liniers and replace him with a Junta. The mutiny failed, but the patriots continued to plot, and in 1810 the May Revolution succeeded in deposing the new viceroy. Larrea did not take part in the discussions at the open cabildo, but was appointed as member of the Primera Junta.

Like many other nineteenth century Argentines prominent in public life, he was a freemason.

=== Primera Junta ===
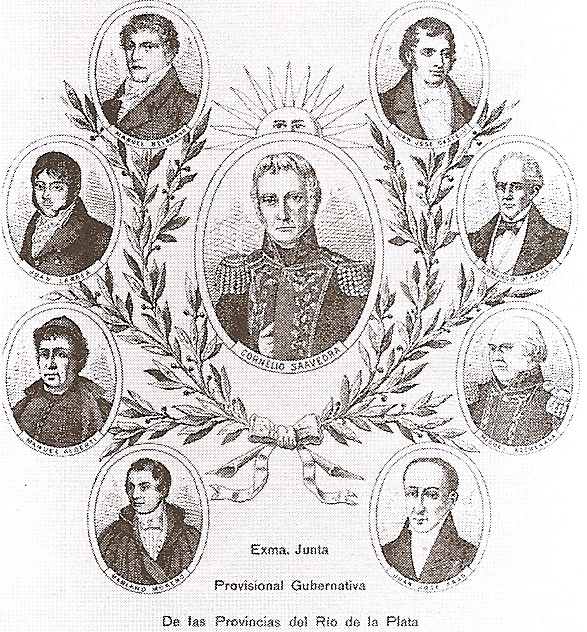
Lithograph of the members of the Primera Junta

Larrea's prestige as an influential businessman promoted his appointment as member of the Primera Junta. However, as with the other members, the precise reasons for his inclusion are unclear. The Junta's membership has been considered a balance between Carlotists and Alzaguists. Larrea resigned his wages from his position as Junta member, and organized the resources for the upcoming war of independence. Together with Manuel de Sarratea he drafted a new code regulating business in Argentina, and he also secured the exile of former viceroy Baltasar Hidalgo de Cisneros by bribing the captain of the ship carrying him, the Dart, to avoid any landfall until reaching the Canary Islands on the far side of the Atlantic. He supported the execution of Liniers after the defeat of his counter-revolution, and supported the secretary Mariano Moreno against the president Cornelio Saavedra. Larrea voted for the incorporation of deputies from other cities into the Junta, although he had previously indicated his opposition to the proposal. It was intended by Saavedra that this change would reduce Moreno's influence within the Junta.

The proposal prevailed, and the Primera Junta became the Junta Grande by incorporating the new deputies. The resignation and death of Mariano Moreno did not reduce the conflicts between Morenists and Saavedrists. A rebellion on behalf of Saavedrism ensued, on 5 and 6 April 1811, aiming at the resignation of all remaining Morenists, including Larrea. Larrea was accused of joining factions and risking public security, and was deposed. Taken prisoner, he was moved to the nearby city of Luján, and then to the distant San Juan.

=== Return to politics ===
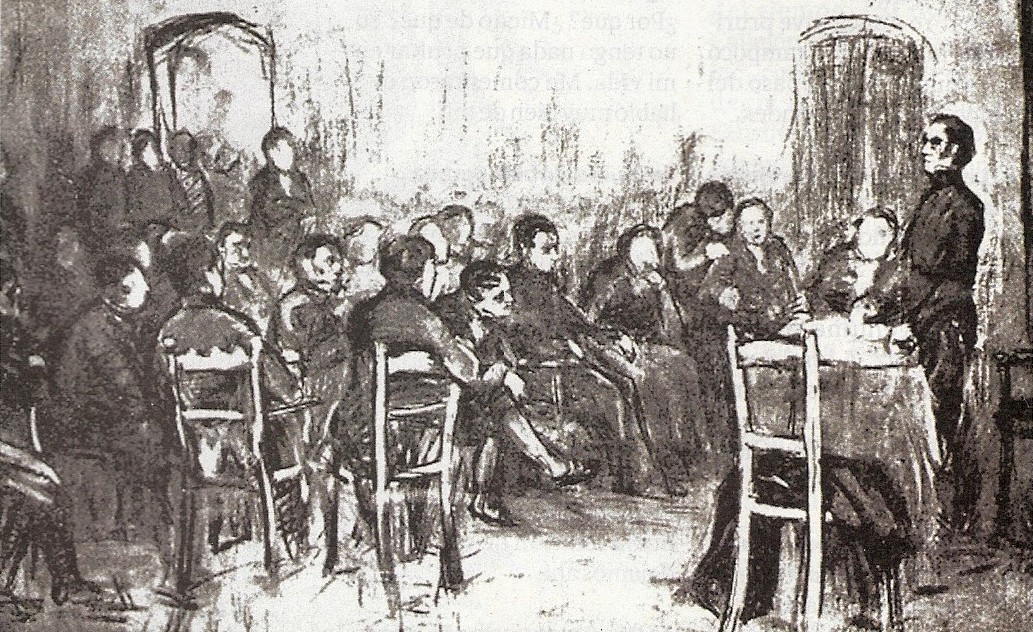
Meeting of the Assembly of Year XIII. Lithograph of the time.

Larrea resumed business activities in San Juan, avoiding politics until 1812. The Revolution of 8 October 1812 returned the Morenists to power, and so Larrea could return to Buenos Aires. He returned as a deputy for Córdoba to the Assembly of Year XIII constituent assembly.

In the assembly, Larrea promoted a customs law which taxed most imports, but made exceptions for machines, scientific tools, books, weapons and military supplies. He organized a local mint, and the supply of the Army of the North. The presidency of the assembly rotated, and Larrea presided from 30 April to 1 June 1813. During this time the Assembly outlawed torture and repealed all noble titles, and also chose the official Argentine National Anthem.

Larrea served briefly in the Second Triumvirate, replacing José Julián Pérez as finance minister, until the Assembly replaced the Triumvirate with the Supreme Director, an office placing the powers of head of state in the hands of one person. Gervasio Antonio de Posadas was chosen as the first Supreme Director. Posadas was concerned about Montevideo, a nearby city which had been under royalist control since the beginning of the war, and a constant threat to Buenos Aires. Carlos María de Alvear complemented the existing siege of Montevideo with a naval blockade, in which Larrea's expertise was instrumental. Alvear developed the military strategy, and Larrea took care of the financial aspects. Larrea drafted a report of the nature, costs and strength of the proposed navy, and the captains and sailors that were required, and planned to negotiate with the American William White. Larrea also appointed the Irish admiral William Brown to lead the attack. The royalist forces in Montevideo were finally defeated in June 1814.

Larrea did not get on well with Brown, who blamed him for disagreements and supply shortages, and even for discontent among the sailors. Buenos Aires did not have a naval tradition, and therefore most of the people involved in the naval campaign were foreigners. As a result, their commitment to the war was often limited. After the capture of Montevideo, Larrea instructed Brown to report directly to the minister of war, and not correspond with himself. Nevertheless, the disagreements continued. Due to the economic crisis caused by the war, Larrea sold the captured ships, decommissioned the navy and sold off the government's own ships, but the sailors complained that they had not received their wages, their reward for the military victory nor their percentage of the sale of the captured ships. Larrea and White were blamed for this. Larrea resigned by the end of the year, after signing an order for the creation of an infantry and a cavalry regiment for the Army of the Andes. Larrea blamed White for the unresolved dispute over the sailors' wages, declaring that he had arranged that White would organize the payment of the wages. Alvear resigned in 1815 after the mutiny of Álvarez Thomas, and all the members of his administration were put on trial. Larrea was accused of abuse of power, administrative fraud and stealing from the national treasury. All his properties were confiscated, and he was exiled.

=== Exile and return ===
After his exile, Larrea moved to Bordeaux in France, and did business with some of his old associates. He continued correspondence with Bernardino Rivadavia, and in 1818 he moved to Montevideo, under Brazilian control at that time, and strengthened his contacts in Buenos Aires from there. He was finally able to return to Buenos Aires in 1822 due to the oblivion law.

Once he returned to Buenos Aires, Larrea avoided political activities and concentrated on business activities. He established a mailing service between Buenos Aires and Le Havre (France), but the venture failed. He then worked in animal husbandry, both in Buenos Aires and in Montevideo. He was appointed consul of the United Provinces by governor Manuel Dorrego, and moved back to Bordeaux to strengthen commerce with France.

He resigned as consul in 1830, shortly after the first appointment of Juan Manuel de Rosas as governor, and returned to private business once more. His business began to fail, and he lived at various times in Montevideo, Colonia del Sacramento and Bordeaux, before returning again to Buenos Aires. He committed suicide on 20 June 1847. He was the last surviving member of the Primera Junta.

== Bibliography ==
- Galasso, Norberto (2004). Mariano Moreno – El sabiecito del sur. Buenos Aires: Colihue. ISBN 950-581-799-1.
- Luna, Félix (2003). La independencia argentina y americana (in Spanish). Buenos Aires: Planeta. ISBN 950-49-1110-2.
- National Academy of History of Argentina (2010). Revolución en el Plata (in Spanish). Buenos Aires: Emece. ISBN 978-950-04-3258-0.
- Ratto, Héctor (1999). Historia del Almirante Brown. Buenos Aires: Instituto de publicaciones navales. ISBN 950-9016-49-7.
