= Domingo French =

Argentine revolutionary (1774–1825)

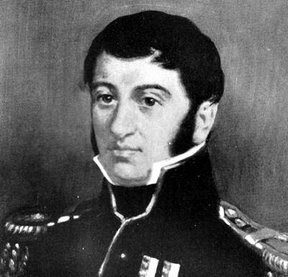
- Born: November 21, 1774; Buenos Aires
- Died: June 4, 1825 (aged 50); Buenos Aires
- Relatives: Antonio Beruti
- Military career
- Allegiance: (Argentina) United Provinces of the River Plate
- Branch: Argentine Army
- Service years: 1806-1820
- Rank: Lieutenant colonel
- Unit: Húsares of Pueyrredón
- Conflicts: British invasions of the Río de la Plata; May Revolution; Battle of Cañada de la Cruz

Domingo María Cristóbal French (November 21, 1774 – June 4, 1825) was an Argentine revolutionary who took part in the May Revolution and the Argentine War of Independence.

== Biography ==
Domingo María French was the son of peninsular Patricio French, an Andalusian who was the son of an Irish nobleman and a Spanish noblewoman, and criolla Isabel Urreaga y Dávila. During his childhood and early years, French spent his time between studies, commercial activities, and helping his father in his business. In 1802 French became the first mail carrier of Buenos Aires.

During the first British invasion, French organized, alongside Juan Martín de Pueyrredón, the corps of Husars. Due to his bravery, he was named lieutenant colonel by the viceroy Santiago de Liniers in 1808.

Like many other nineteenth century Argentines prominent in public life, French was a freemason.

== The Revolution ==
During the week preceding the May Revolution, he supported the movement with enthusiasm. On May 21, the Plaza de la Victoria (Victory Square, known today as Plaza de Mayo) was occupied by some 600 armed men, headed by Domingo French and Antonio Luis Beruti, under a group known as the "chisperos", who shouted requests for the forming of an open Cabildo and the deposition of Viceroy Cisneros. Alarmed by the commotion on the square, the viceroy agreed to a meeting for the following day and called Cornelio Saavedra, commander of the Patricios Regiment, to calm the citizenry at the square. Saavedra communicated to the "chisperos" that there would be an open cabildo on May 22 and asked them to stand down.

To ensure they reached their goal, the group controlled the list of invitees and denied entry to the cabildo to known royalists. French, Beruti and their followers gave each patriot member a light blue and white emblem (escarapela) to differentiate them from the royalists.

When on May 24, the Cabildo opened deliberations directed by a Junta with Cisneros at its head, French opposed them and, upon the general rejection the Junta dissolved. On the morning of the 25th of May, 1810, groups of citizens joined at the square with the support of the "chisperos" requesting Cisneros stepped down and the formation of a new government. Once a new government was formed, the Primera Junta at the onset of the revolution, French joined the more radical faction, the morenistas (followers of Mariano Moreno).

French was tasked with the creation of an infantry corps called América, and later formed as "the Star". He then accompanied Juan José Castelli to Córdoba Province and took part in the execution of Santiago de Liniers and his accomplices.

== War and exile ==
When the Junta Grande was formed, the morenista faction was weakened, as from that moment on, decisions had to take the whole country into account, not just the point of view of the city of Buenos Aires. On 5 and 6 April 1811, a popular protest demanded total separation from the morenista movement and to make laws considering the whole of the country, not only for Buenos Aires and its elite. They saw Cornelio Saavedra (rival of Mariano Moreno) as their leader. Saavedra did not favor a revolution and slowly became less involved in government. After these first successes, French, along with other morenistas were stripped of their posts and power and exiled to Patagonia. He returned in 1812 and rejoined the army. French took part on the siege of Montevideo in 1814 and in the Army of the North in 1815.

Later, he opposed the policies of the Directorio. He denounced the conspiration of Carlos María de Alvear in Brazil and rejected Supreme Director Juan Martín de Pueyrredón. He was persecuted and exiled to the United States of America along with Manuel Dorrego in February 1817. He returned to Buenos Aires in 1819 and again rejoined the army. He fought in the Battle of Cañada de la Cruz, where he was taken prisoner. After regaining his freedom, he retired in Buenos Aires, where he died on June 4, 1825.

== Family ==
Domingo French belonged to a prominent family of Buenos Aires, being the son of Patricio French Alcalá, a Spanish merchant, and María Isabel de Urreaga, a noble woman, daughter of Domingo de Urreaga, born in Biscay, and Bernardina Dávila, born in Buenos Aires. He was married to Juana Josefa de Posadas Dávila, daughter of Felipe Santiago de Posadas and María Antonia Dávila, belonging to a distinguished family of the city.

His paternal lineage came from Galway, Ireland, descendant of Oliver French and William Joyes, who had served as Mayors of Galway. By his maternal line, he was a descendant of Amador Vaz de Alpoim and Margarida Cabral de Melo, whose ancestors were related to the Portuguese Royal House. His wife was a great-great-granddaughter of Ignacio Fernández de Agüero, who served as Mayor of the city of Buenos Aires in 1666.
