= Domingo Matheu =

1st President of the Junta Grande in the United Provinces of the Río de la Plata

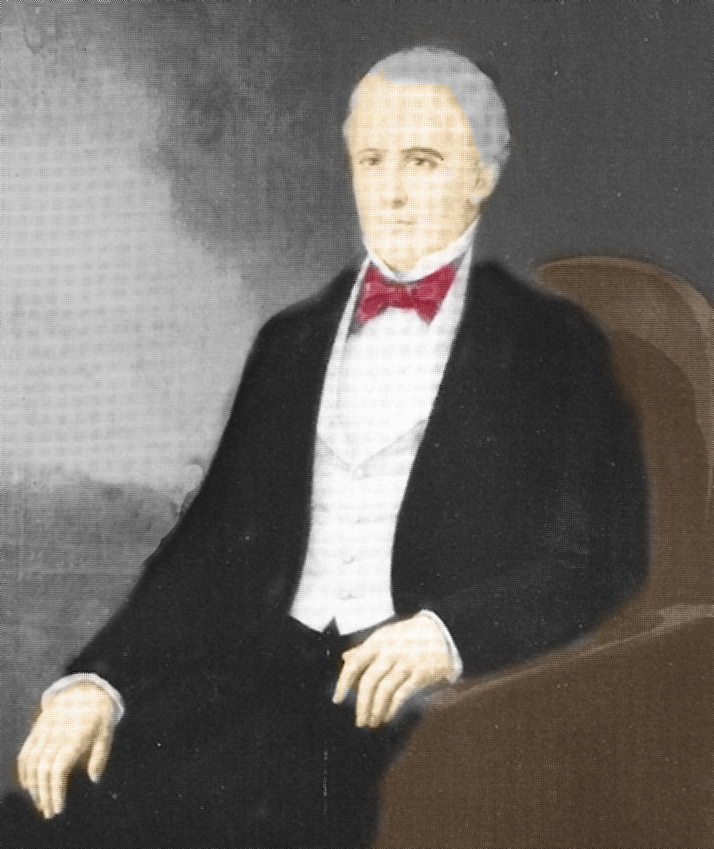
- Portrait of Domingo Matheu

2nd President of the Junta Grande in the United Provinces of the Río de la Plata
- In office August 26, 1811 – September 23, 1811
- Preceded by: Cornelio Saavedra
- Succeeded by: First Triumvirate

Committee member of the Primera Junta and Junta Grande
- In office May 25, 1810 – September 23, 1811 Serving with Manuel Alberti, Miguel de Azcuénaga, Manuel Belgrano, Juan José Castelli, Juan Larrea

Personal details
- Born: Domingo Bartolomé Francisco Matheu; August 4, 1765 Mataró, Spain
- Died: March 28, 1831 (aged 65) Buenos Aires, United Provinces of the Río de la Plata
- Resting place: La Recoleta Cemetery
- Party: Patriot
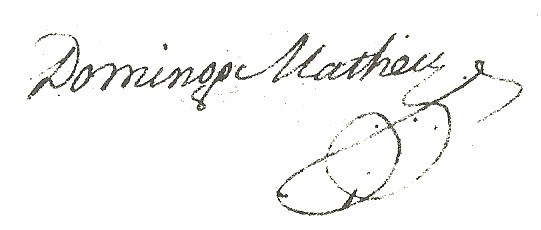
- Signature

Military service
- Allegiance: Viceroyalty of the Río de la Plata
- Rank: Lieutenant colonel
- Battles/wars: British invasions of the River Plate

Domingo Bartolomé Francisco Matheu (4 August 1765 in Mataró, Spain – 28 March 1831 in Buenos Aires, Argentina) was a Spanish-born Argentine businessman and politician. He was a member of the Primera Junta, the first national government of modern Argentina, and the second president in the end of the Junta Grande from August to September 1811.

== Biography ==
Domingo Bartolomé Francisco Matheu was born on August 4, 1765, in Mataró. His parents were Juan Pablo José Benito Matheu Ros and Antonia Chicola. He studied in the school "Pías" of Mataró, and then focused on math and naval studies. He became a pilot, and visited other Spanish territories as La Habana, Philippines and the Canary Islands. He moved to Buenos Aires in 1791 and opposed the trade regulations of the time. He sought both economic and political support among the local society.

Matheu joined the Regiment of Miñones during the British invasions of the River Plate. He was appointed lieutenant of the second company, under the command of Juan Larrea. On August 19, 1806, a few days after the recapture of Buenos Aires from the British, Matheu, Larrea and other neighbours requested authorization to create a new military unit, "Urbanos Voluntarios de Cataluña". Viceroy Santiago de Liniers approved it on September 26. As Larrea got ill, Matheu led this unit during the second British invasion in 1807. After the Battle of Miserere, Matheu and his forces withdrew to downtown Buenos Aires and fought in the buildings of the city. He was awarded by a Real Order in January 1809 for his role in the defense of Buenos Aires.

The Peninsular War in Spain, along with the capture of the king Ferdinand VII and the fall of the Junta of Seville, escalated political disputes in Buenos Aires that led to the May Revolution. Several criollos thought that the viceroy Baltasar Hidalgo de Cisneros, appointed by the fallen Junta, did not have legitimacy, and requested an open cabildo to discuss it. Azcuénaga attended it, and voted for the creation of a Junta with deputies from all the provinces, with the Cabildo ruling in the interregnum. However, the majority agreed with the creation of a junta, but with another junta of people from Buenos ruling in the meantime. The viceroy tried to stay in government as president of the Junta, which was resisted by the criollos. The reasons of Matheu's inclusion in the Junta are unclear, as with all its members. A common accepted theory considers it to be a balance between Carlotists, Alzaguists, the military and the clergy.

The May Revolution began the Argentine War of Independence, which was complicated by the lack of weapons in the country. Without enough resources to buy them, the Primera Junta established armories. The first director, Juan Taragona, was soon replaced by Matheu. Working alongside German gunsmiths as Juan Frye and Fernando Lamping, he directed the creation of several muskets and some pieces of artillery. The armory of Buenos Aires, located at the site of the modern Palace of Justice, had only 90 employees, including seven slaves and seven natives. They had limited technical knowledge but managed to build and repair nearly three hundred muskets and a hundred carbines. Matheu gave financial support to the armory with his own wealth. Eduard Holmberg was appointed director in 1813, replacing Matheu, but Matheu kept working for the armory anyway. He supervised as well the armory of the Tucumán Province. He directed later the manufacture of military uniforms.

After the departure of Cisneros following the May Revolution he was designated vocal of the Primera Junta. The Primera Junta became the Junta Grande afterwards, and Matheu was designated its president when Cornelio Saavedra left it to join the battles in the north. Matheu and Larrea supported the national government with the money they obtained from commerce.

He retired from political life in 1817, staying just in commercial activities until his death in 1831.

== Legacy ==
Domingo Matheu led the first armory of Argentina. General Manuel Nicolás Savio organized the construction of an arsenal in Rosario, Santa Fe, named after Matheu. The cornerstone was placed on October 3, 1942, and worked for many decades. The place was used as a detention center during the Dirty War in the 1970s.

== Bibliography ==
- Luna, Félix (2003). La independencia argentina y americana (in Spanish). Buenos Aires: Planeta. ISBN 950-49-1110-2.
- National Academy of History of Argentina (2010). Revolución en el Plata (in Spanish). Buenos Aires: Emece. ISBN 978-950-04-3258-0.
- Scenna, Miguel Ángel (2009). Mariano Moreno. Buenos Aires: H. Garetto Editor. ISBN 978-987-1494-05-4.
