= Antonio Beruti =

Argentine politician

Antonio Luis Beruti
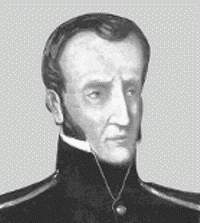
- Antonio Beruti

Personal details
- Born: 1772 Buenos Aires, Viceroyalty of the Río de la Plata
- Died: September 24, 1841 (aged 68–69) Battle of Rodeo del Medio
- Occupation: Military Officer, Politician

Military service
- Allegiance: Argentina
- Branch/service: Argentine Army
- Rank: Lieutenant Colonel
- Battles/wars: May Revolution, Argentine Civil Wars, Battle of Rodeo del Medio

Antonio Luis Beruti (1772 – September 24, 1841) was an Argentine revolutionary who participated in the May Revolution that started the Argentine War of Independence, and later fought in the Argentine civil wars.

== Biography ==
Born in Buenos Aires, Beruti was educated in Spain. After concluding his studies, he returned to Argentina and joined the nascent independence movement, which he helped to organize. Along with Domingo French, he led a group of revolutionaries known as the Chisperos, who played a pivotal role in the Semana de Mayo, the week beginning on May 18, 1810, which culminated in the May Revolution. Along with French, he distributed white and blue ribbons to the populace, so that patriots could distinguish themselves from royalists.

In the Cabildo Abierto of May 22, he voted for the deposition of the viceroy Baltasar Hidalgo de Cisneros and was the most fervent opposer to a Junta presided over by him. He was quoted as saying: "A Junta presided over by Cisneros is the same as Cisneros' viceroyalty". On May 25, he confronted the members of the Cabildo to demand the abolition of the Viceroyalty and the election of a new junta. His demands were met, and that day the Cabildo elected Argentina's first independent executive, the Primera Junta, which was presided over by Cornelio Saavedra.

A month later, Beruti was named lieutenant colonel of the America Regiment, created by the Junta, and organized by himself and Domingo French. A supporter of Mariano Moreno, Beruti remained faithful to his ideals even after Moreno's death. For this reason, he began attending meetings at the Café de Marcos, a center of opposition to the Saavedrist faction. On the fifth and sixth of April, 1811, the Saavedrists organized a coup against their opponents in the government. Miguel de Azcuénaga, Hipólito Vieytes, and Nicolás Rodriguez Peña were forced to resign and subsequently exiled from Buenos Aires. Beruti, along with French, Donado, Posadas, and most other active members of the Patriotic Society, was exiled to – among other places – Chile.

Beruti then participated in the Chile campaign alongside General José de San Martín in early 1817, and fought in the Battle of Chacabuco. His wife, Doña Mercedes Ortíz, was one of the ladies who, the previous year, along with Doña Remedios de Escalada de San Martín, had donated their jewels for the liberation campaign. On March 13, 1817, Bernardo O'Higgins, at the request of San Martín, asked Beruti to return to the city of Mendoza and arranged his passport with governor Luzuriaga. He was able to return to Buenos Aires on November 17. He later became a member of the Unitarian Party and participated in the civil war against the Federalists.

Beruti died on September 24, 1841, in the Battle of Rodeo del Medio, where he had fought under the command of Gregorio Aráoz de Lamadrid. He was buried in an unmarked grave and his remains have never been identified.
