= Oblivion law =

The Oblivion law (Spanish: Ley de Olvido) was an 1821 Argentine law promulgated by Martín Rodríguez, governor of the Buenos Aires province. It was promoted by his minister Bernardino Rivadavia, and set a general amnesty to all the people guilty of treason. During the Argentine War of Independence, many governments had taken such measures against their political enemies and exiled them; this law allowed them to return to Buenos Aires free of charges. The law said that:

It is necessary not to remember, if possible, the ingratitudes, errors or weakness that degraded men or afflicted the people in this enterprise too big and famous. For this, the government has thought that it does the right thing by that it acts wisely by proposing in this opportunity the adjunted proposal of Oblivion law.

Juan Larrea, Carlos María de Alvear, Manuel Dorrego and Manuel de Sarratea, among others, could return to Argentina because of this law.
