= Telégrafo Mercantil =

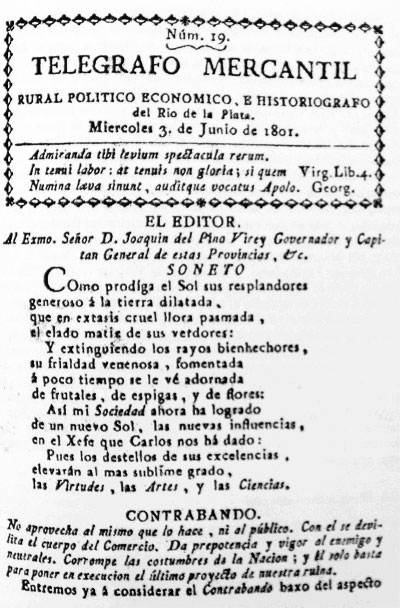
An issue of the Telégrafo Mercantil.

The "Telégrafo Mercantil, Rural, Político, Económico e Historiográfico del Río de la Plata" (in Spanish, "Merchant, rural, political, economic and historiographic telegraph of the Río de la Plata") was the first newspaper edited in Buenos Aires. It was founded on 1 April 1801 by Francisco Cabello y Mesa and Manuel Belgrano, and approved by viceroy Avilés.

== Contents ==
In the Telegraph collaborated leading figures of the era. Manuel José de Lavardén published in first issue of the newspaper his "Ode to the Paraná". Thaddäus Haenke published numerous articles about his travels. The lawyer, journalist and poet Domingo de Azcuénaga y Basavilbaso, worked with some writings. Manuel Belgrano, Juan José Castelli, Pedro Cerviño, Luis José de Chorroarín, and many others, found room in the newspaper to disseminate their ideas and creations.

The Telegraph expanded in Buenos Aires the use of the word "Argentine" to refer to everything related to the Río de la Plata zone or Buenos Aires, so that the newspaper is considered one of the origins of the name of Argentina.

Its pages offered not only editorials, but also gave rise to poetry, local color notes, general information, and trade matters in the territories of the Viceroyalty of Río de la Plata. The Telégrafo Mercantil of 11 October 1801, for example, featured an announcement that the area around Quilmes would be open for hunting for leather and hides from the following: vizcachas, deer, foxes, skunks, otters abundant in coastal streams and the Riachuelo, as well as wild dogs (whose hides are used for boots), swans, partridges and seagulls (for their feathers).

The periodical faced economic problems early on, however, as well as disputes with the colonial authorities, who looked askance at the writers' criticism and satire of their manner and policy. The newspaper ceased publication in October 1802; 110 issues had been published, as well as numerous special issues and supplements.
