= Martín de Álzaga =

Spanish merchant and politician

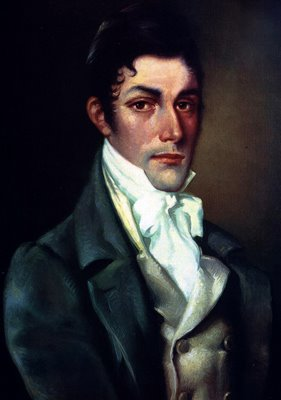
- Born: November 11, 1755; Valle de Aramayona, Spain
- Died: July 6, 1812 (aged 56); Buenos Aires, United Provinces
- Burial place: La Recoleta Cemetery
- Military career
- Allegiance: Viceroyalty of the Río de la Plata
- Conflicts: British invasions of the Río de la Plata; Attempted coup against Viceroy Liniers

Martín de Álzaga (11 November 1755 – 6 July 1812) was a Spanish merchant and politician during the British invasions of the Río de la Plata.

== Hero of the Reconquest ==
He arrived in Buenos Aires at 11 years of age, poor and speaking only Basque. He became a merchant, gaining riches in the slave trade, and selling textiles and firearms. He became a respected member of the community and a politician and member of the Buenos Aires Cabildo, by 1785 as Defender of the Poor. He was one of the founding members of the Consulado de Comercio de Buenos Aires (the equivalent of today's Chamber of Commerce), in 1794.

When in 1806 the first British Invasion came to Buenos Aires, he put his fortune at the service of the Creole reconquest, organizing a group of conspirators and joining with other groups formed and funded by other prominent merchants, such as Sáenz Valiente and Juan Martín de Pueyrredón. The invading General Beresford had ordered the confiscation of all arms in civilian hands, but Álzaga who was a specialist in arms smuggling collected hundreds and installed secret gun-repair shops. He rented houses around the main square (Plaza Mayor) in secret, and from there they excavated tunnels to mine the Fort.

His organizational skills were notable; he had a strong will and natural leadership, but he was never popular. The wages for the volunteers were paid for by Álzaga from his own coffers. He rented the Perdriel Ranch, in present-day San Martín, where the volunteers trained. The British spy network only heard about this place a few days before the start of the reaction, and was too late to attack Perdriel, only accelerating the fight for reconquest.

When Santiago de Liniers arrived back from Montevideo and started the Reconquest, on 12 August, he was joined by Álzaga's secret army, and the British were rapidly defeated. Beresford's surrender came in early and the viceroyalty was saved.

== Defense of Buenos Aires ==
Álzaga convened an open council (cabildo abierto), which removed viceroy Sobremonte from military command, giving it to Liniers, and forbidding Sobremonte's return to Buenos Aires. On January 1, 1807, Álzaga was re-elected Mayor and took control of the city government.

The British fleet had not left the Río de la Plata, and awaited reinforcements which arrived under the command of General Whitelocke. They captured Montevideo in June 1807, easily defeating Sobremonte's forces. Álzaga simply ordered the removal of the viceroy and ordered his arrest, replacing him temporarily with Liniers.

He participated in the organization of volunteer city militias, and army of more than 6,000 men, and paid for a regiment of Asturians and Vizcayans out of his own funds.

On 2 July 1807 the expected invasion came through, and Liniers was defeated at Miserere, on the outskirts of the city. Whitelocke did not pursue the escaping Creole army giving his troops three days of rest. Álzaga convinced the defeated Liniers on preparing the city's defenses, taking advantage of the respite; organized the defense house-by-house, illuminated the city with oil lamps to continue working through the night and made sure all houses had projectiles and other defensive arms on their roofs.

The British resumed their attack on June 5, but made the tactical mistake of coming in separate columns, making it easier for the defenders to defeat them separately. At noon on the 7th, the British capitulated and retreated. Álzaga forced General Whitelocke to sign a document that included the surrender of Montevideo.

== Revolution of January 1, 1809 ==
Liniers and Álzaga became the heroes of the day, but soon they had a mutual conflict, as much as by the failed administration by the viceroy, as Liniers was French and Spain had declared war on Napoleon Bonaparte's France. Álzaga was dismayed by the liberal trade policies enacted by Viceroy Santiago de Liniers y Bremond. He criticized liberal trade policies generally and was an opponent to them.

On January 1, 1809, he organized a revolution to depose Liniers. Álzaga took his regiments to the streets (the "Gallegos", "Miñones de Cataluña" and "Vizcaínos", all Spaniards), organized a protest against the viceroy and tried to force Liniers to resign. In his place he would name a Junta, managed by Spaniards with two Creole secretaries: Mariano Moreno and Julián de Leyva. Liniers resignation was on the condition that military command passed to general Ruiz Huidobro, his second in command. This disconcerted Álzaga and gave time for colonel Cornelio Saavedra, commander of the Patricios Regiment. He in turn disbanded the mutinous Spanish forces and forced Liniers to withhold his resignation.

This failed revolution was a precursor of the May Revolution the following year and highlighted the conflict lines between the royalist Spanish and the Creoles and produced a schism that was the start of the May Revolution.

Álzaga was sent to prison to Carmen de Patagones and a trial followed. The mutinous Spanish regiments were disbanded, which eased the way for the May Revolution. Governor Francisco Javier de Elío, in Montevideo, formed a Junta to govern that city and rescued Álzaga from Carmen de Patagones. The Junta was disbanded when the new viceroy, Baltasar Hidalgo de Cisneros, arrived in Buenos Aires.

Álzaga took part in the subsequent revolution against Cisneros the following year, and even though he was not present in the open cabildo of May 22, 1810, it is known he participated in the negotiations to leading to the formation of the Primera Junta, as he placed three members of his party: Mariano Moreno, Juan Larrea and Domingo Matheu.

== Trial and death ==
On 1 July 1812, the government discovered a plot of Spaniards against the First Triumvirate, whose members Rivadavia, Pueyrredón and Chiclana, prepared to take over on July 5, the fifth anniversary of the defense against the British. During the ensuing investigation, Secretary Rivadavia, based on dubious proof and confessions extended the accusations against Álzaga and his co-conspirators.

Álzaga was arrested, tried and condemned to death along with other people. The executions started on July 4, two days after his arrest which raises the suspicion that the trial outcome was previously decided. More than 30 men were executed, including military commanders, merchants and clerics.

He was executed on 6 July 1812 in Buenos Aires. The bodies were then hanged and left on the Plaza de la Victoria for three days.
