= Primera Junta =

1810 independent government of Argentina

Primera Junta Junta Provisional Gubernativa de las Provincias del Río de la Plata a nombre del Señor Don Fernando VII Provisional Governing Board of the Provinces of the River Plate in the name of His Lord Don Ferdinand VII
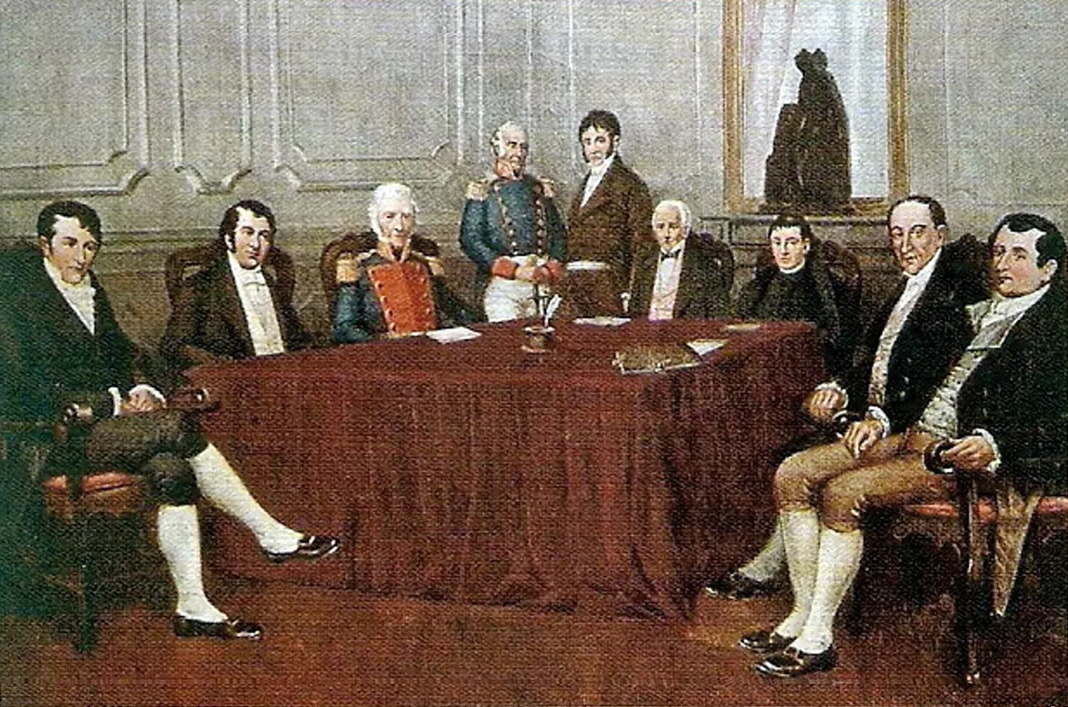

Type
- Type: Junta (Peninsular War)

History
- Established: 25 May 1810 (May Revolution)
- Disbanded: 18 December 1810
- Succeeded by: Junta Grande

Leadership
- President: Cornelio Saavedra
- Voting members: Manuel Belgrano; Manuel Alberti; Miguel de Azcuénaga; Juan Larrea; Juan José Castelli; Domingo Matheu
- Secretaries: Mariano Moreno; Juan José Paso

Elections
- Last election: May Revolution

Meeting place
- Fort of Buenos Aires

The Primera Junta ("First Junta"), or Junta Provisional Gubernativa de las Provincias del Río de la Plata ("Provisional Governing Junta of the Provinces of the Río de la Plata"), is the most common name given to the first government of what would eventually become Argentina. It was formed on 25 May 1810, as a result of the events of the May Revolution. The Junta initially only had representatives from Buenos Aires. When it was expanded, as expected, with the addition of representatives from the other cities of the Viceroyalty of the Río de la Plata, it became popularly known instead as the Junta Grande (Grand Junta) or Junta Provisional Gubernativa de Buenos Aires. The Junta operated at El Fuerte (the fort, where the modern Casa Rosada stands), which had been used since 1776 as a residence by the viceroys.

== Creation ==
This Junta—officially named the Junta Provisional Gubernativa de las Provincias del Río de la Plata a nombre del Señor Don Fernando VII (Provisional Governing Junta of the Provinces of Río de la Plata in the Name of Lord Don Ferdinand VII)—allegedly meant to govern in the name of the King of Spain, while he was imprisoned by Napoleon Bonaparte. Juntas were a form of transitional or emergency government that emerged during the Napoleonic invasion in Spanish cities that had not succumbed to the French and which attempted to maintain Spanish sovereignty. The most important for Spanish America was the Junta of Seville, which claimed sovereignty over overseas possessions, given the fact that the province of Seville historically had enjoyed exclusive rights to the American trade. Its claims had been rejected by Spanish Americans, and its authority was quickly superseded by a Supreme Central Junta of Spain, which included American representation.

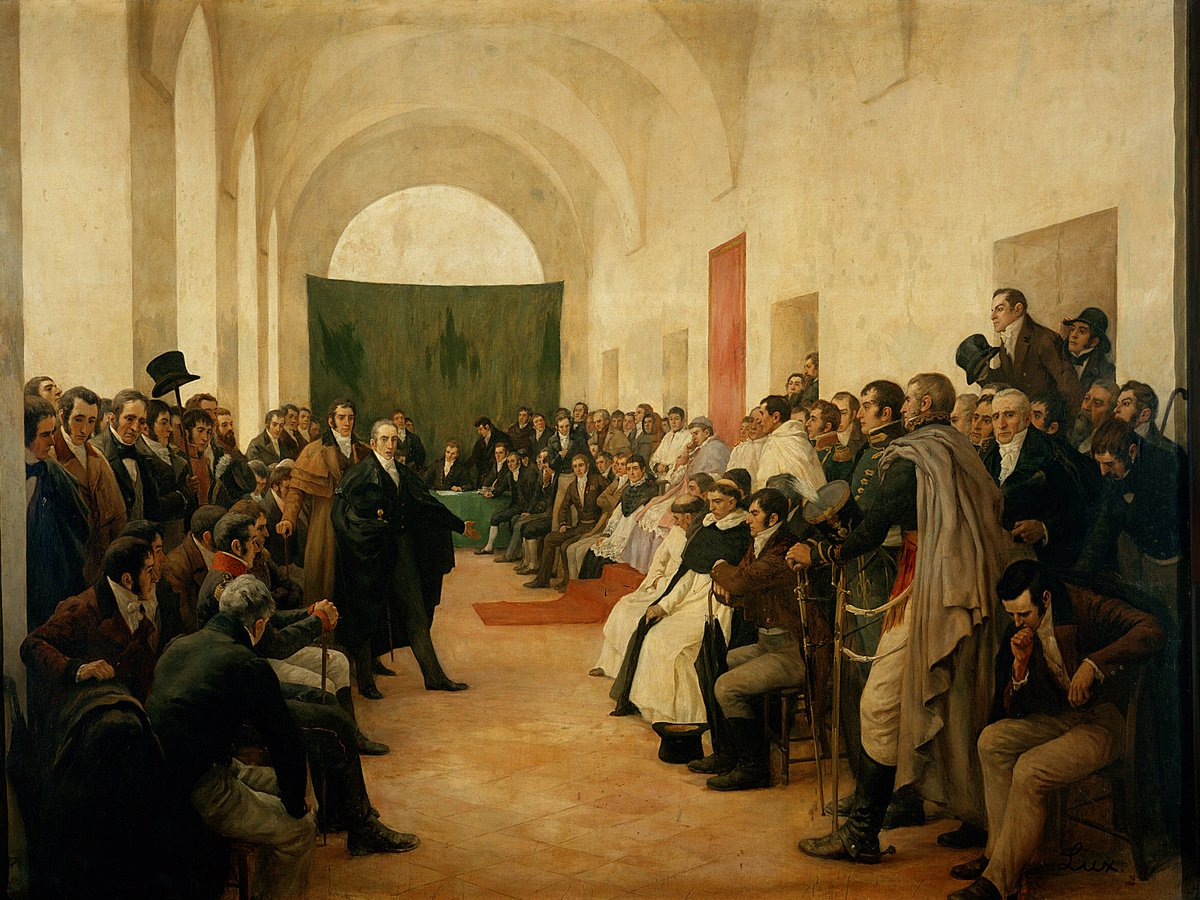
The Open cabildo of 22 May decided to replace the viceroy with a Junta

When the Supreme Central Junta abolished itself in 1810, the politically active inhabitants of Buenos Aires saw no better moment than this to establish a local government. They had been influenced by the recent democratic and republican philosophical wave, and were also concerned about the commercial monopoly exerted by the Spanish crown, which was suffocating the local economy. Historically Buenos Aires province had partially mitigated this problem through contraband. Local politicians, such as former council member and legal advisor to the viceroy, Juan José Castelli, who wanted a change towards self-government and free commerce, cited traditional Spanish political theory and argued that since the King had been imprisoned, sovereignty had returned to the people.

The people were to assume the government until the King returned, just as the subjects in Spain had done two years earlier with the establishment of juntas. The viceroy and his supporters countered that the colonies belonged to Spain and did not have a political relationship with the King only. Therefore, they should follow any government body established in Spain as the legal authority, namely the Supreme Central Junta of Spain and its successor, the Council of Regency.

The meeting of a Buenos Aires cabildo abierto (an extraordinary meeting of the municipal council with the assistance of over 200 notables from the government, the church, guilds and other corporations) on 22 May 1810, came under strong pressure from the militias and a crowd that formed in front of the cabildo hall on the Plaza Mayor (today the Plaza de Mayo), up to 25 May. The crowd favored the stance of the local politicians, and the cabildo ended up creating the Primera Junta, the first form of local government in the territory that would later become Argentina. Spain would never recover its dominion over that territory. From the very beginning of the new government, two factions manifested their differences, a more radical one, whose visible leader was the Junta's Secretary, Mariano Moreno, and the conservative wing that supported the Junta's president, Cornelio Saavedra.

In general the principles of the May Revolution were popular sovereignty, the principle of representation and federalization, division of powers, the maintenance of the mandates, and publication of the government's actions

== Personnel ==
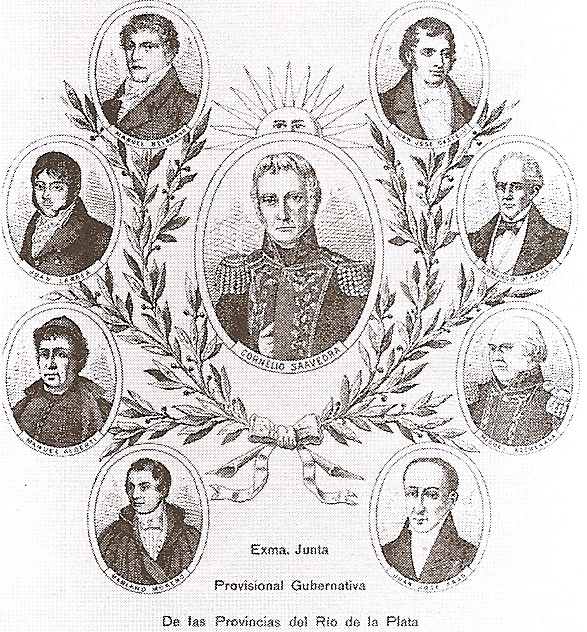
1897 lithograph of the members of the Primera Junta

President

- Cornelio Saavedra

Secretaries:

- Mariano Moreno
- Juan José Paso

Committee member

- Manuel Alberti
- Miguel de Azcuénaga
- Manuel Belgrano
- Juan José Castelli
- Domingo Matheu
- Juan Larrea

== Duration and transformation ==
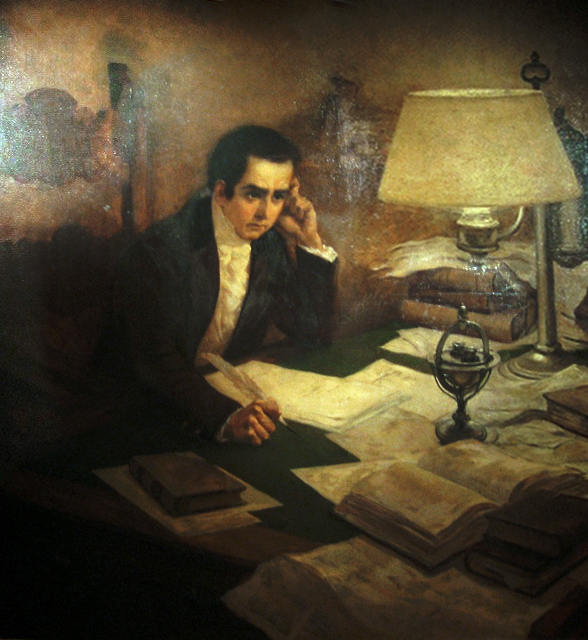
Mariano Moreno, Secretary of War, was one of the most important members of the Primera Junta

Despite the replacement of viceroy Baltasar Hidalgo de Cisneros, the Royal Audience and the Cabildo stood with the authorities that existed before the revolution, who opposed the Junta since its first day. The Audience refused at first to swear allegiance to the Junta, and when they finally did, prosecutor Caspe did so with clear gestures of contempt. Caspe would later be ambushed near his home, in retaliation for this. The Cabildo imposed a time limit on the Junta: if the General Congress was not formed in six months, the Cabildo would reassume government. The Junta answered the same day, rejecting such requirements. The Audience then requested that the Junta submitted to the Council of Regency, but the Junta refused, on the grounds that Cisneros did not so submit and the Audience did not request him to. The Audience itself swore allegiance to the Council shortly after, and they were all banished in response. Together with the ex-viceroy Cisneros, they were forced to take the ship Dart that left them at the Canary Islands; the exceptions were Márquez del Plata, who was at the Banda Oriental at the time, and the octogenarian Lucas Muñoz Cubero.

From the early days of the Primera Junta there was a strong rivalry between Saavedra and Moreno. According to Ignacio Núñez, the Morenists accused Saavedra of plotting to restore the tyranny of the viceroys in his office, while the Saavedrists accused Moreno of usurping government roles that were not intended for him. Matheu would also point in his memories that the Morenists were upset because they perceived that Saavedra enjoyed receiving honors and distinctions that they had chosen to avoid.

The Junta was received with mixed reactions from the other cities of the viceroyalty. Santa Fe, Entre Ríos, Misiones, Corrientes and Mendoza supported the change, others did not. Upper Peru, which greatly benefited from the system of mita to exploit the mines in Potosi, supported the absolutist system for a long time. Javier de Elío in Montevideo denied recognition to the Junta. Paraguay was torn between supporters of either side, but royalists prevailed. However, the most immediate danger to the Junta came from Cordoba, where Santiago de Liniers came out of his retirement and started to organize an army to lead a counter-revolution against Buenos Aires. The Junta ordered Ortiz de Ocampo to stand against those counter-revolutionaries and bring the leaders as prisoners to Buenos Aires. A later ruling requested to execute them instead, but after defeating Liniers, Ortiz de Ocampo decided to ignore the latter and instead to follow the first ruling. The Junta removed Ocampo from his duty for this act of disobedience, and replaced him with Juan José Castelli. Castelli ordered the execution of the counter-revolutionaries by 26 August, with the exception of the priest Orellana. By this time, Mariano Moreno was popularly regarded as the leader of the revolution, whose resolution permitted the radical changes to the absolutist system that the Junta had managed so far.

There's some controversy among historians about the authenticity of the Operations plan, a secret document attributed to Mariano Moreno, that set a harsh government policy in the fields of economics, politics and international relations.

Military authorities, fearing the loss of power by Saavedra, pressured the Junta to control Moreno. Moreno, on the other hand, succeeded in getting the approval of decrees that limited Saavedra and others. By December 1810 tensions had reached a peak. Saavedra got the support of deputies sent by the interior provinces that had not yet been allowed to join the Junta. With this backing, Saavedra gave Moreno his most serious political setback: he forced Moreno to present his resignation on 18 December. With this resignation, the integration of the deputies from the other provinces to the Junta became possible.

Created on 25 May 1810, the Primera Junta was thus transformed on 18 December of the same year into the new Junta Grande by the introduction of representatives from other provinces of Río de la Plata.

== Foreign policy ==
The Primera Junta was concerned with the risk of Portuguese expansion towards La Plata, either directly or through the Carlotist project. The diplomacy in Spain attempted to prevent the dispatch of a punitive army, limiting the armed conflicts to the royalists in Paraguay, Upper Peru and the Banda Oriental. The Junta declared itself a natural ally of any city that revolted against the royalists; either those that did so in support of the May Revolution or those who revolted on their own (Chile and Paraguay shortly after Manuel Belgrano's defeat).

Britain, allied with Spain in the Napoleonic Wars, stayed neutral in the conflicts between patriots and royalists. Nevertheless, the British policy towards the conflict was to favour British trade as long as it did not conflict with the neutral policy.

== Bibliography ==
- Abad de Santillán, Diego. Historia Argentina (in Spanish). Buenos Aires: TEA (Tipográfica Editora Argentina).
- Halperín-Donghi, Tulio. Politics, Economics, and Society in Argentina in the Revolutionary Period. Cambridge, Cambridge University Press, 1975. ISBN 978-0-521-20493-4
- Galasso, Norberto (2004). Mariano Moreno – El sabiecito del sur. Buenos Aires: Colihue. pp. 6–7. ISBN 950-581-799-1.
