= Junta Grande =

Government of the United Provinces of the Río de la Plata (now Argentina) from 1810-11

Junta Grande (Spanish pronunciation: [ˈxunta ˈɣɾande]), or Junta Provisional Gubernativa de Buenos Aires, is the most common name for the executive government of the United Provinces of the Río de la Plata (modern-day Argentina), that followed the incorporation of provincial representatives into the Primera Junta (First Junta).

== Origin ==
The Primera Junta, created on May 25, 1810 out of the May Revolution, was meant to be a provisional government until a Junta representative of all the cities of the Viceroyalty of the Río de la Plata was integrated. Reactions from the provinces, however, were not homogeneous. Some of them recognised the Buenos Aires Junta and the outcome of the events of the May Revolution, while others sought to exercise exclusive control over their own affairs, and still others continued to recognize the Regency Council in Spain.

Thus, in order to avoid royalists taking political advantage of the situation, the Buenos Aires Junta sought to quickly assert its power. On May 27, 1810, it delivered messages to every one of the Viceroyalty municipal councils (Spanish: cabildos), asking them to elect representatives to join the Junta in Buenos Aires. By early December, most delegates had already arrived in the capital city, and they were asking for their effective incorporation into the governing body (that was held up due to the infighting between centralists led by the Junta's Secretary of War Mariano Moreno, and federalists led by the Junta's President, Cornelio Saavedra). Ultimately, Saavedra managed to orchestrate Moreno's resignation and on December 18, 1810, the Junta Grande was at last established.

It governed until September 23, 1811 (since August 26, 1811 under the presidency of Domingo Matheu), when it was replaced as the executive authority by the First Triumvirate. However, reorganized as a Conservative Junta, it retained some controlling functions over the Triumvirate.

== Bibliography ==
- Busaniche, José Luis (1969). Historia argentina (in Spanish). Buenos Aires: Ed. Solar.
- Calvo, Nancy; Roberto Di Stéfano; Klaus Gallo (2002). Los curas de la Revolución (in Spanish). Buenos Aires: Ed. Emecé.
- Horowicz, Alejandro (2004). El país que estalló (in Spanish). Buenos Aires: Ed. Sudamericana.
- López, Vicente Fidel (1954). Historia de la República Argentina (in Spanish). Buenos Aires: Ed. Sopena.
- Segreti, Carlos (1980). La aurora de la Independencia (in Spanish). Buenos Aires: Ed. La Bastilla.
- Sierra, Vicente (1973). Historia de la Argentina (in Spanish). Buenos Aires: Ed. Garriga.
