= National Academy of History of Argentina =

Argentine learned society

Coordinates: 34°36′34″S 58°22′15″W

Academia Nacional de la Historia de la República Argentina
- Founded: 1893; 133 years ago
- Type: Historical society
- Purpose: History of Argentina
- Location: Balcarce 139, Buenos Aires
- Region served: Argentina
- Method: research, seminars and publishing
- Key people: Dr. Eduardo Martiré, President
- Website: www.anh.org.ar

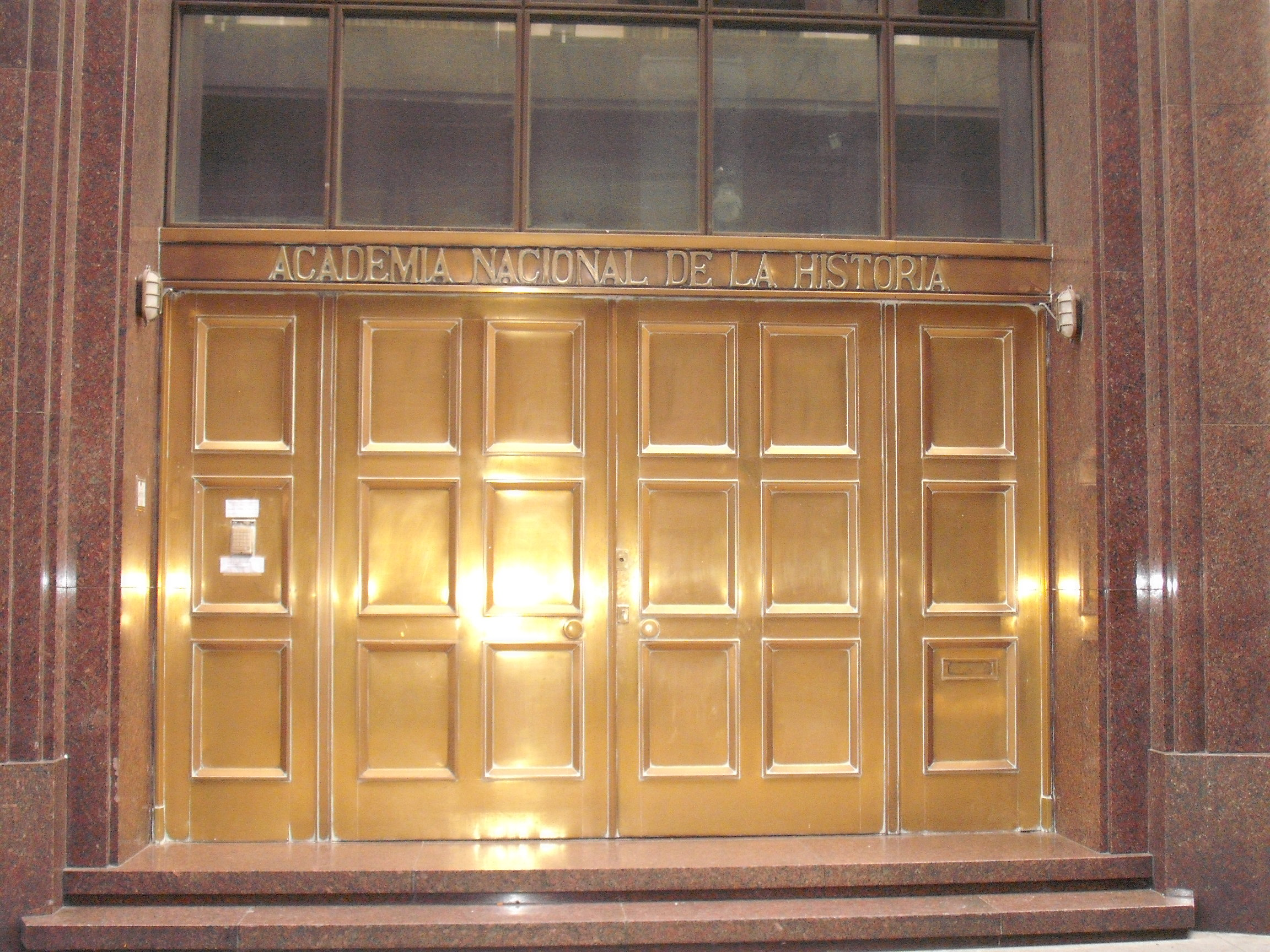
Entrance on Balcarce Street

The National Academy of History of the Argentine Republic (Spanish: Academia Nacional de la Historia de la República Argentina) is a non-profit learned society established to foster the study and dissemination of Argentine history.

== Overview ==
Founded in 1893 by Ernesto Quesada, José Toribio Medina, and former President Bartolomé Mitre, the academy was originally chartered as the Junta de Historia y Numismática Americana (Argentine Society of History and Numismatics), and met in the home of Alejandro Rosa (located within the historic Illuminated Block, an erstwhile Jesuit center of learning).

Mitre, who had abandoned politics in the 1880s, dedicated most of his later years to historiography, and led the academy until his death in 1906. Some of its early work included reeditions of Ulrich Schmidl's Viaje al Río de la Plata, and of Jesuit historian Pedro Lozano's Historia de la Compañía de Jesús en la provincias del Paraguay, among other hitherto rare texts from the early colonial era.

Subsequently, the academy was housed in the former building of the Argentine National Congress, and shared the structure with the National Archives. Mitre's former home, which in 1907 was converted into the Mitre Museum, became its new home in 1918. Dr. Martiniano Leguizamón, president from 1923 to 1927, launched the society's Boletín in 1923, Dr. Ricardo Levene, its president from 1927 to 1959, directed its production of the seminal Historia de la nación Argentina, a ten-volume compendium published between 1936 and 1942. He rechartered the society with its present name on January 21, 1938, and persuaded President Agustín Pedro Justo to transfer it to the national government's purview.

The academy was again relocated, in 1971, to its present site, a federal government building near the Casa Rosada, and built in the late 1940s where the old Congress building once stood. The academy's membership is numerary, and is, accordingly, limited to 40 historians, and by invitation only.
