= Intendancy of Chuquisaca =

Intendancy of the Spanish Empire

Intendencia de Chuquisaca
- Intendancy of the Spanish Empire
- 1782–1825
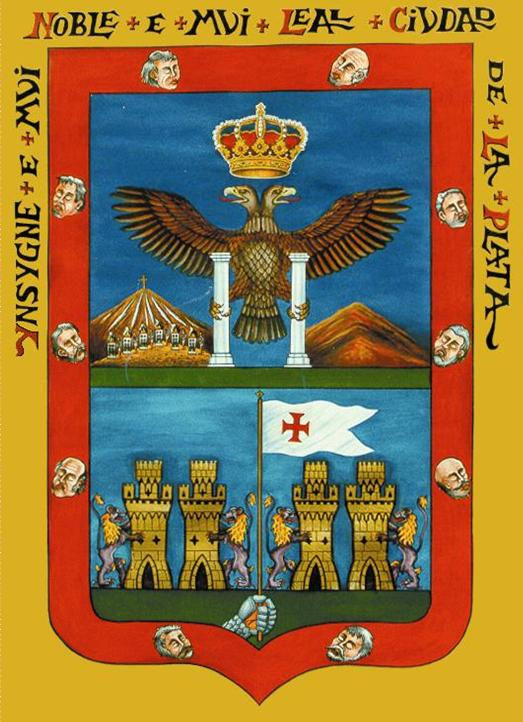
- Coat of arms
- Capital: Ciudad de La Plata de la Nueva Toledo
- Government
- Intendant
  - 1783–1785: Ignacio Flores (first)
  - 1824–1825: Pedro A. Olañeta (last)
- Historical era: Viceroyalty of the Río de la Plata
  - Established: 1782
  - Revolution: 25–26 May 1809
  - Disestablished: 22 February 1825
- Subdivisions
  - Type: Partidos
  - Units: 7 in total
Succeeded by
Chuquisaca Department

The Intendancy of Chuquisaca, also of Charcas or of La Plata, was an administrative area that was part of the Spanish Empire within the Viceroyalty of the Río de la Plata located within the territory of the current Republic of Bolivia and whose capital was the present-day city of Sucre. It was the smallest municipality, located between the Pilcomayo River and the Grande River. The president of the Real Audiencia de Charcas was at the same time Intendant Governor of Chuquisaca.

The Municipality, in addition to the city of La Plata (Sucre) and after the separation of Cochabamba, was divided among the following parties or sub-delegations: Yamparaez (headquartered in the town of Yamparaez), Pilaya and Paspaya (headquartered in the town of Cinti), Tomina (with head in the town of La Laguna), Paría (with head in the town of Poopó), Oruro (with head in the town of Oruro) and Carangas (with head in Asiento del Espíritu Santo).

The council of the city of La Plata and the council of the town of Oruro existed in the administration. Despite being a town, La Laguna did not have a council. The town of Tomina had it in the past, but not during the existence of the administration.

== History ==
The Intendancy of Chuquisaca was created by the Royal Ordinance of 28 January 1782, which divided the newly created Viceroyalty of the Río de la Plata into eight intendancies, among them that of Chuquisaca, partially based on the already existing Governorate of Charcas.

On May 25, 1809, the Chuquisaca Revolution took place, which was a popular uprising against Ramón García de León y Pizarro, president of the Royal Audience of Charcas in the city of Chuquisaca, and also mayor of Chuquisaca. Led by Bernardo de Monteagudo, Jaime de Zudáñez and other followers of Republican ideals, popular protests were held in the streets of Chuquisaca with the slogan "Death to the bad government, long live King Fernando VII !", encouraged by rumors of a Carlotist conspiracy. The mayor of Potosí, Francisco de Paula Sanz and the designated successor of Pizarro, Vicente Nieto, sent troops to quell the rebellion by order of Viceroy Baltasar Hidalgo de Cisneros of Buenos Aires, which peacefully entered Chuquisaca on December 24, 1809.

On May 25, 1810, the May Revolution took place in Buenos Aires, during which Viceroy Baltasar Hidalgo de Cisneros was deposed, Chuquisaca remaining under Spanish rule.

On July 13, 1810, the viceroy of Peru proclaimed the provisional reincorporation of the territory of the Audiencia de Charcas to the viceroyalty of Peru. Clarifying the viceroy in the annexation decree that he did so: until the Hon. Lord Viceroy of Buenos-Ayres, and other legally constituted authorities, since only the royal authority could definitively dismember the territory of the viceroyalty of Buenos Aires.

On November 13, 1810, Chuquisaca ruled in favor of the First Board of Buenos Aires.

After the battle of Yavi (November 15, 1816) the Spanish troops regained territorial control of Upper Peru, reestablishing the Audiencia and Municipality de Charcas, which then became dependent on the Viceroyalty of Peru, headed by the viceroy José Fernando de Abascal y Sousa, Marquis of Concord (1806-1816). The command of Juan Martín de Pueyrredón, Supreme Director of the United Provinces of the Río de la Plata, was replaced by that of the Viceroy of Peru.

On February 22, 1818, the general in chief of the Peruvian army appointed General Maroto interim governor and mayor of the city and province of La Plata, as well as president of the Royal Court of Charcas, where he fought the rebel and patriot leaders, maintaining the territory under control until 1823, when General Andrés de Santa Cruz reconquered La Paz for the patriots.

In the midst of the fight against the independence supporters, the last mayor was Antonio Vigil in 1824, appointed by Olañeta.

== Intendant Governors ==
- Ignacio Flores (1783 - 1785)
- Vicente de Gálvez y Valenzuela (1785 - 1790)
- Joaquín del Pino y Rozas (1790 - 1797)
- Ramón García de León y Pizarro (1797 - 25 May 1809)
- Chuquisaca Revolution (revolutionary) (25 May 1809 - 30 September 1809)
- Vicente Nieto (30 September 1809 - 13 November 1810)
- Juan José Castelli (revolutionary) (27 December 1810 - 26 January 1811)
- Juan Martín de Pueyrredón (revolutionary) (26 January 1811 - 13 March 1811)
- Juan Ramírez Orozco (1811 - 1813)
- Francisco Antonio Ortiz de Ocampo (revolutionary) (September 1813 - November 1813)
- Jerónimo Marrón de Lombera (1813 - 1815)
- Martín Rodríguez (revolutionary) (1815)
- Juan Antonio Fernández (revolutionary) (1815)
- Miguel Tacón y Rosique (1815-1816)
- José Pascual de Vivero y Salaverría (1816 - 1818)
- Rafael Maroto Yserns (1818 - 1824)
- Pedro Antonio de Olañeta (1824 - 1825)
