= Chuquisaca Revolution =

1809 popular uprising against Spanish colonial rule in Chuquisaca (now Sucre, Bolivia)

The Chuquisaca Revolution was a popular uprising on 25 May 1809 against Ramón García de León y Pizarro, Governor-intendant of the Intendancy of Chuquisaca (or Charcas) (today Sucre, Bolivia). The Real Audiencia of Charcas, with support from the faculty of University of Saint Francis Xavier, deposed the governor and formed a junta. The revolution is known in Bolivia as the "First Cry of Freedom" (Spanish: Primer grito libertario), meaning the first phase in the Spanish American Wars of Independence. The level of hostility against the Spanish Crown and news from both the American Revolution and the French Revolution has made historians dispute whether such a description is accurate. However, accounts depict it as the first step towards liberty in Latin America against the Spanish Crown.

== Causes ==
Although nearly 30 years passed, the indigenous revolutions led by Túpac Amaru II and Tomás Katari and their violent repression were still remembered. The revolutions ranged from the south of modern Colombia to the north of modern Argentina and Chile.

There was great concern about recent developments in Spain, where French forces, led by Napoleon, had invaded many parts of the country, captured Spanish King Ferdinand VII, and replaced him with Napoleon's brother Joseph Bonaparte. Without the authority of a king leading them, the Spanish resistance created government juntas.

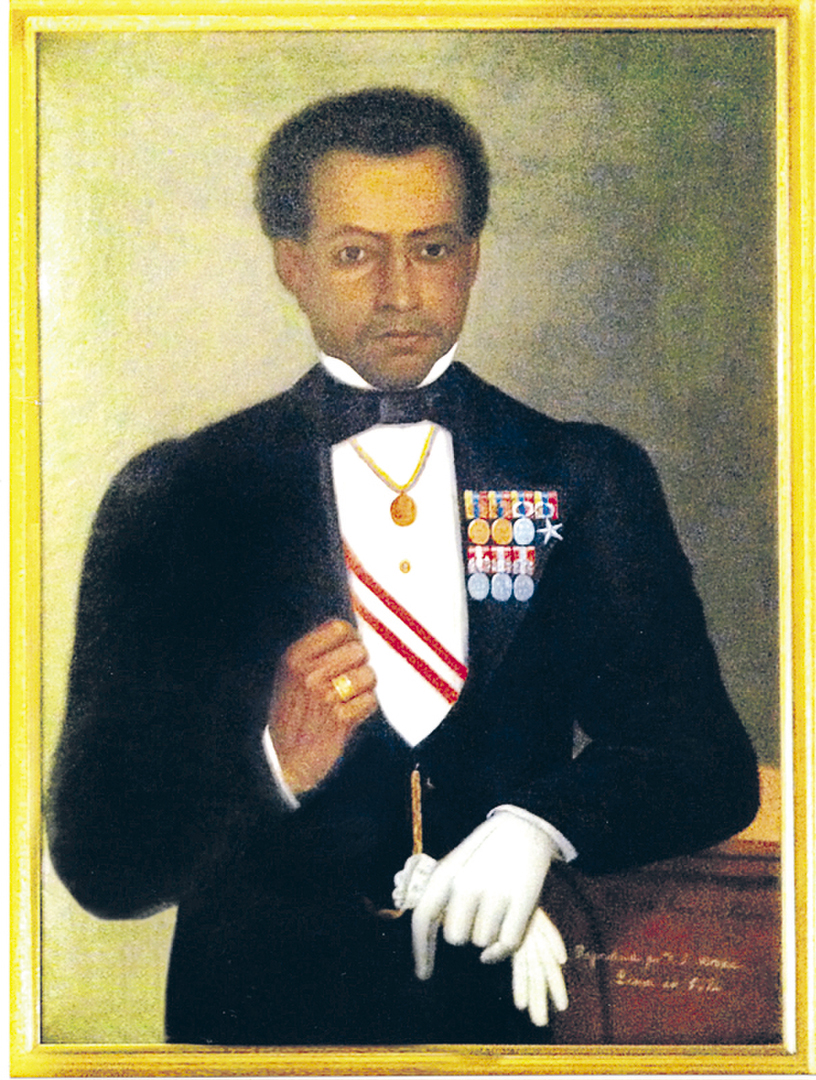
Bernardo de Monteagudo

== Development ==
The news of the fall of Ferdinand VII in Spain caused great concern in the city and the University of Chuquisaca, and there were important debates about the legitimacy of the government. Bernardo de Monteagudo explained an idea that promoted self-determination, which would be later known as "Syllogism of Chuquisaca:"

Shall we follow the fate of Spain or resist in the Americas? The Indies are a personal domain of the King of Spain. The King is impeded to reign. Therefore, the Indies shall govern themselves.

The junta, initially loyal to King Ferdinand VII of Spain, was justified by the suspicion that García León de Pizarro planned to turn the country over to Princess Carlota Joaquina, the wife of Prince Regent John of Portugal and Brazil, but from the beginning, the revolution provided a framework for the actions of supporters of independence, who spread the rebellion to La Paz, where a Junta Tuitiva ("protecting junta") was formed on 16 July. It broke with both authority in Spain and the Viceroyalty of the Río de la Plata. After the second and more radical uprising was put down violently by an army sent by the Viceroy Baltasar Hidalgo de Cisneros, the movement at Chuquisaca lost all external support. It finally ended in October when Viceroy José Fernando de Abascal sent forces from Lima.

== Historiography ==
The Chuquisaca revolution did not intend to alter the city's loyalty to the king, but the revolution of La Paz openly declared independence. Today, historians disagree on whether the revolution of Chuquisaca was motivated by independence or was just a dispute between Ferdinand VII's and Carlota's supporters. Consequently, there is disagreement on whether the first revolution to proclaim independence in Spanish America was that of Chuquisaca or that of La Paz. The researchers Juan Reyes and Genoveva Loza support the latter by arguing that in Chuquisaca, the Spanish system of government was maintained and did not support the revolution in La Paz. Others like Charles Arnade, Teodocio Imaña, Gabriel René Moreno, and Felipe Pigna argue, however, that the Chuquisaca revolution supported independence and cited as its main foundation the political philosophical concept of the "Syllogism of Chuquisaca," which proposed self-determination. Still other historians locate the first "cry of freedom" in Ecuador, rather than Bolivia, because of a revolt that took place in Quito in August 1809.

== Revolution in Chuquisaca ==
=== Upper Peru ===
The territory of Upper Peru, now in Bolivia, was made up of four provinces and two political-military governments. One of the provinces was that of Chuquisaca, in whose capital Chuquisaca, also called La Plata or Charcas and now Sucre, had the headquarters for the Royal Court of Charcas.

== See also ==
- Bolivian War of Independence
- La Paz revolution
- May Revolution
- Bolivian Declaration of Independence

== Sources ==
- Arnade, Charles W. (1957). The Emergence of the Republic of Bolivia. New York: Russell and Russell.
