= May Revolution =

1810 revolution in Buenos Aires

- Part of the Spanish American wars of independence
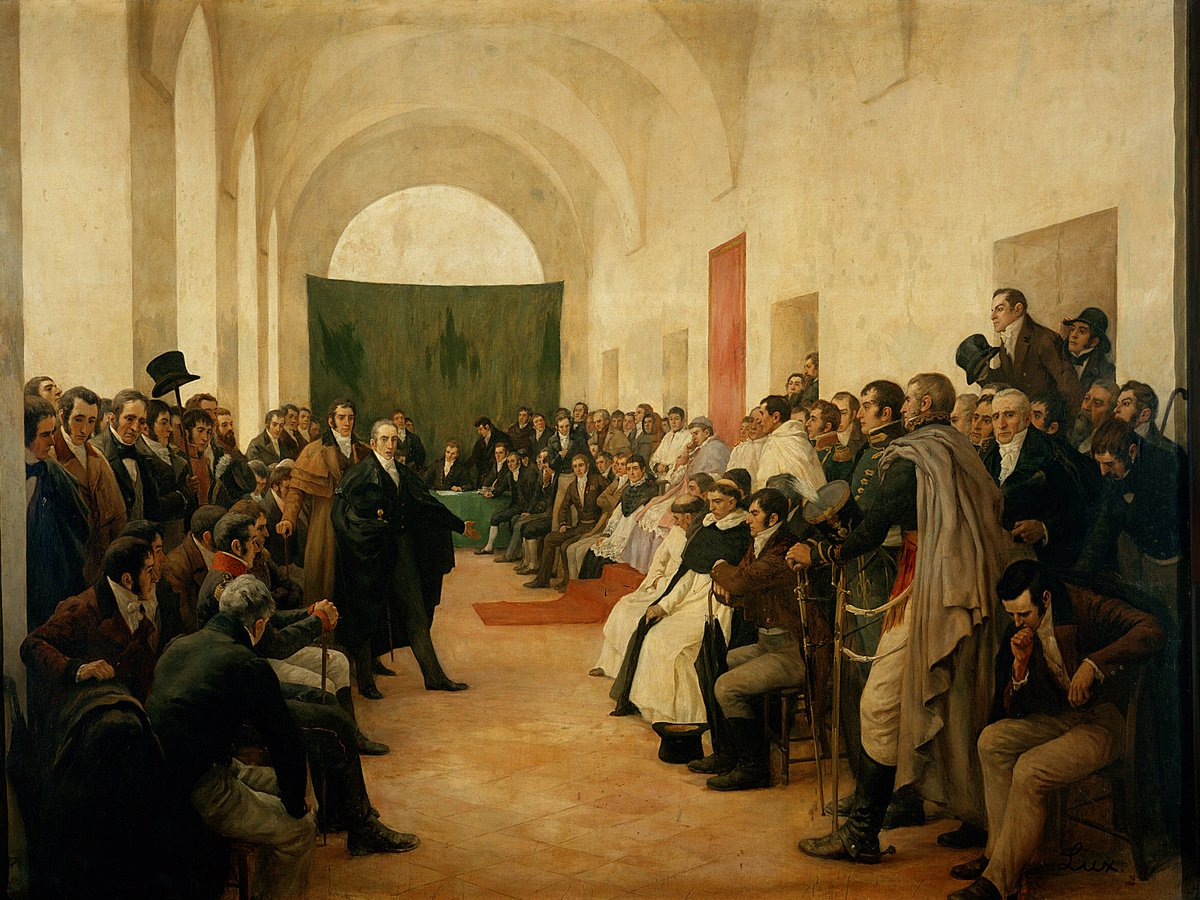
- The Open Cabildo on 22 May 1810
- Date: 25 May 1810
- Location: Buenos Aires
- Also known as: Revolución de Mayo
- Cause: Popular sovereignty
- Outcome: The Primera Junta seized the government, ousting the Spanish viceroy Baltasar Hidalgo de Cisneros and launching a series of military expeditions that began the Argentine War of Independence.

The May Revolution (Spanish: Revolución de Mayo) was a week-long series of events that took place from 18 to 25 May 1810, in Buenos Aires, capital of the Viceroyalty of the Río de la Plata. This Spanish colony included roughly the territories of present-day Argentina, Bolivia, Paraguay, Uruguay, and parts of Brazil. The result was the removal of Viceroy Baltasar Hidalgo de Cisneros and the establishment of a local government, the Primera Junta (First Junta), on 25 May.

The May Revolution was a direct reaction to Napoleon's invasion of Spain. In 1808, King Ferdinand VII abdicated in favour of Napoleon, who granted the throne to his brother, Joseph Bonaparte. A Supreme Central Junta led resistance to Joseph's government and the French occupation of Spain, but eventually suffered a series of reversals that resulted in the Spanish loss of the northern half of the country. On 1 February 1810, French troops took Seville and gained control of most of Andalusia. The Supreme Junta retreated to Cádiz, formed the Council of Regency of Spain and the Indies to govern, and dissolved itself. News of these events arrived in Buenos Aires on 18 May, brought by British ships.

Viceroy Cisneros tried to maintain the political status quo, but a group of criollo lawyers and military officials organized an open cabildo (a special meeting of notables of the city) on 22 May to decide the future of the Viceroyalty. The Regency of Spain was the prelude to the Spanish Cortes of Cádiz of 1810 and the Spanish Constitution of 1812. All of these Spanish governments considered the Argentine Junta to be insurgent and denied it any legitimacy to govern the territories of the viceroyalty. At the other end, delegates of the Junta refused to recognize the Council of Regency in Spain and established a junta to govern in place of Cisneros, as the government that had appointed him Viceroy no longer existed. To maintain a sense of continuity, Cisneros was initially appointed president of the Junta. However, this caused much popular unrest, and so Cisneros resigned under pressure on 25 May. The newly formed government, the Primera Junta, included only representatives from Buenos Aires and invited other cities of the Viceroyalty to send delegates to join them. The revolutionary army began the war and this resulted in the outbreak of a secessionist civil war between the regions that accepted the outcome of the events at Buenos Aires and those that remained loyal to Spain.

The May Revolution began the Argentine War of Independence, although no declaration of independence from Spain was issued at the time and the Primera Junta continued to govern in the name of the king, Ferdinand VII, as a subordinate king to popular sovereignty. As similar events occurred in many other cities of the continent, the May Revolution is also considered one of the early events of the Spanish American wars of independence. The question of the mask of Ferdinand is particularly controversial in Argentine History. Historians today debate whether the revolutionaries were truly loyal to the Spanish crown, or whether the declaration of fidelity to the king was a necessary ruse to conceal the true objective—to achieve independence—from a population that was not yet ready to accept such a radical change. The Argentine Declaration of Independence was issued at the Congress of Tucumán on 9 July 1816.

== Causes ==
=== International causes ===
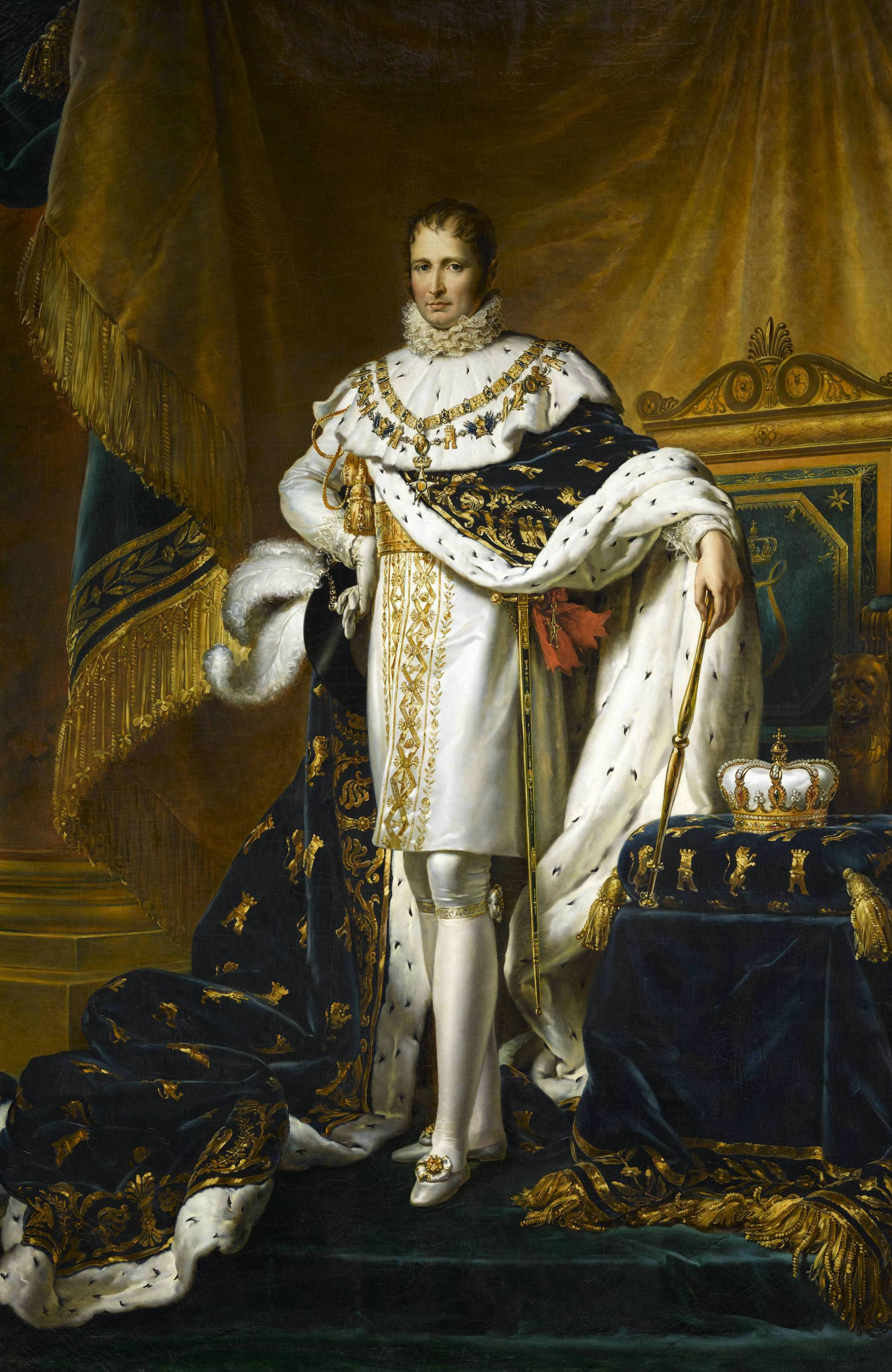
The rule of Joseph Bonaparte as King of Spain was resisted by Spaniards, and cast doubts on the legitimacy of the Spanish viceroys

The United States Declaration of Independence from Great Britain in 1776 led criollos (Spanish peoples born in the Americas) to believe that revolution and independence from Spain were feasible. Between 1775 and 1783, the American patriots of the Thirteen Colonies waged a war against both the local loyalists and the Kingdom of Great Britain, eventually establishing a republican government in the place of a constitutional monarchy. The fact that Spain had aided the colonies during their war with Britain weakened the idea that it would be a crime to end one's allegiance to the parent state.

The ideals of the French Revolution of 1789 spread across Europe and the Americas as well. The overthrow and execution of King Louis XVI and Queen Marie Antoinette ended centuries of monarchy and removed the privileges of the nobility. Liberal ideals in the political and economic fields developed and spread through the Atlantic Revolutions across most of the Western world. The concept of the divine right of kings was questioned by the French Declaration of the Rights of Man and of the Citizen, by the oft-quoted statement that "all men are created equal" in the United States Declaration of Independence and even by the Spanish church.

However, the spread of such ideas was forbidden in the Spanish territories, as was the sale of related books or their unauthorized possession. Spain instituted those bans when it declared war on France after the execution of Louis XVI and retained them after the peace treaty of 1796. News of the events of 1789 and copies of the publications of the French Revolution spread around Spain despite efforts to keep them at bay. Many enlightened criollos came into contact with liberal authors and their works during their university studies, either in Europe or at the University of Chuquisaca (modern Sucre). Books from the United States found their way into the Spanish colonies through Caracas, owing to the proximity of Venezuela to the United States and the West Indies.

The US Declaration of Independence inspired similar movements in the Spanish colonies in South America

The Industrial Revolution started in Britain, with the use of plateways, canals and steam power. This led to dramatic increases in the productive capabilities of Britain, and created a need for new markets to sell its products. The Napoleonic Wars with France made this a difficult task, after Napoleon imposed the Continental System, which forbade his allies and conquests to trade with Britain. Thus Britain looked to new sources of trade, including Spain's colonies in South America, but could not do so because the colonies were restricted to trade only with Spain. To achieve this economic objective, Britain initially tried to invade Río de la Plata and capture key cities in Spanish America. When that failed, they chose to promote the Spanish-American aspirations of emancipation from Spain.

The mutiny of Aranjuez in 1808 led King Charles IV of Spain to abdicate in favour of his son, Ferdinand VII. Charles IV requested that Napoleon restore him to the throne; instead, Napoleon crowned his own brother, Joseph Bonaparte, as the new Spanish King. These events are known as the Abdications of Bayonne. Joseph's coronation was met with severe resistance in Spain, which started the Peninsular War, and the Supreme Central Junta took power in the name of the absent king. This also led to Spain switching alliances from France to Britain. France eventually invaded Sevilla, and a Council of Regency based in Cádiz replaced the disbanded Supreme Central Junta.

=== National causes ===
William Carr Beresford surrenders to Santiago de Liniers during the British invasions of the River Plate

Spain forbade its American colonies to trade with other nations or foreign colonies, and imposed itself as the only buyer and vendor for their international trade. This situation damaged the viceroyalty, as Spain's economy was not powerful enough to produce the huge supply of goods that the numerous colonies would need. This caused economic shortages and recession. The Spanish trade routes favoured the ports of Mexico and Lima, to the detriment of Buenos Aires. As a result, Buenos Aires smuggled those products that could not be obtained legitimately. Most local authorities allowed this smuggling as a lesser evil, even though it was illegal, and it occasionally equalled in volume the legal commerce with Spain. Two antagonistic factions emerged: the landowners wanted free trade so they could sell their products abroad, while the merchants, who benefited from the high prices of smuggled imports, opposed free trade because prices would come down.

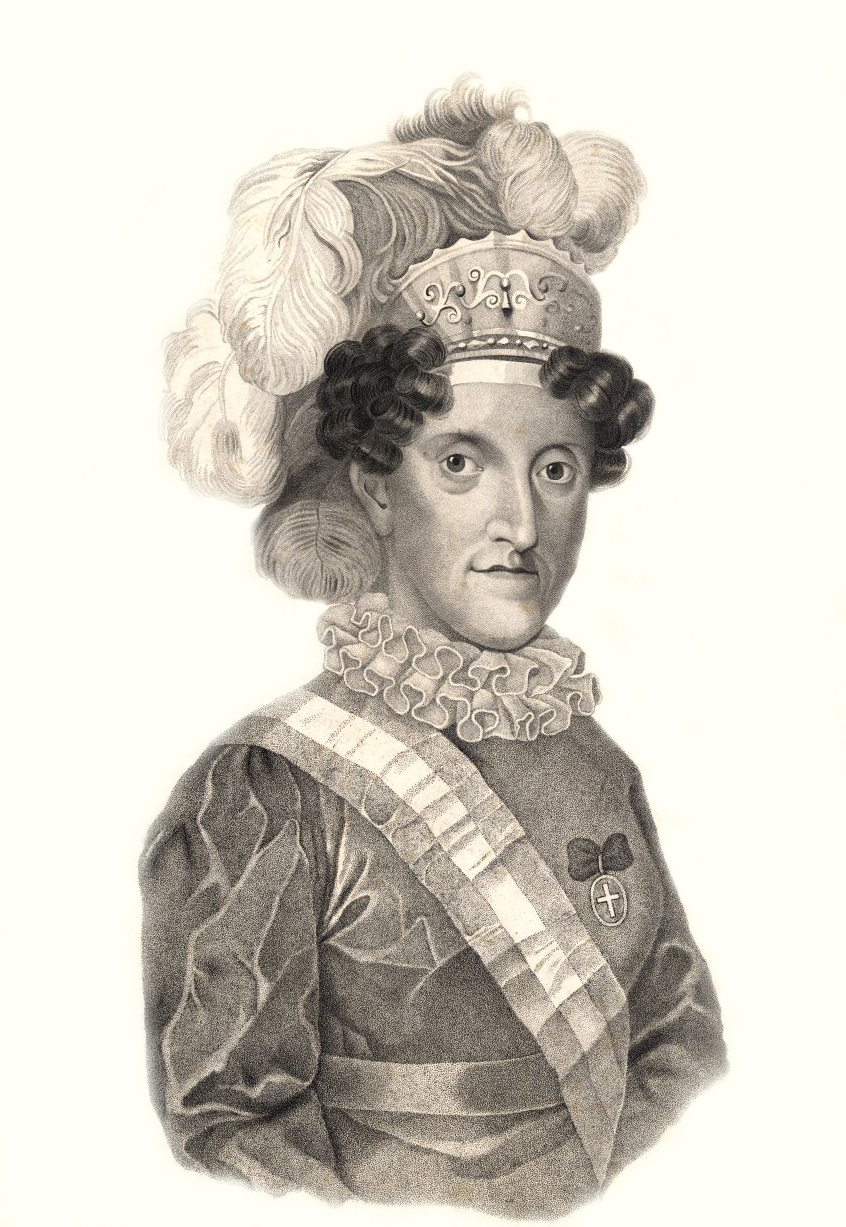
The coronation of Infanta Carlota Joaquina was considered an alternative to revolution

The Spanish monarchy appointed their own candidates to most of the political offices in the viceroyalty, usually favouring Spaniards from Europe. In most cases, the appointees had little knowledge of or interest in local issues. Consequently, there was a growing rivalry between criollos and peninsulars (those born in Spain). Most criollos thought that peninsulars had undeserved advantages and received preferential treatment in politics and society. The lower clergy had a similar sentiment about the higher echelons of the religious hierarchy. Events developed at a slower pace than in the United States independence movement. This was in part because the clergy controlled the entire educational system in Spanish America, which led the population to hold the same conservative ideas and follow the same customs as in Spain.

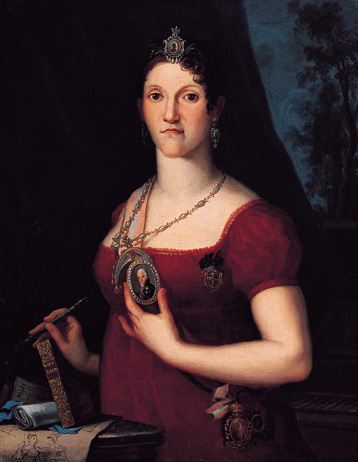
The coronation of Carlota Joaquina de Borbón was briefly considered an alternative to the Revolution

Buenos Aires and Montevideo were captured and recaptured during the British invasions. In 1806, a small British army led by William Carr Beresford managed to occupy Buenos Aires for a brief time; a Montevidean army led by Santiago de Liniers recaptured the city. The following year, a larger army seized Montevideo, but was overwhelmed by the forces of Buenos Aires; the British capitulated and returned Montevideo to the viceroyalty. There was no aid from Spain during either invasion. Liniers organized criollo militias during the preparations for the second invasion, in spite of the prohibition against them. The Patricios Regiment, led by Cornelio Saavedra, was the biggest criollo army. These events gave criollos military power and political influence that they did not have before and, since the victory was achieved without any help from Spain, it boosted criollo confidence in their independent capabilities.

The Portuguese royal family left Europe and settled in their colony of Brazil in 1808, after their escape from the Napoleonic invasion of Portugal. Carlota Joaquina, sister of Ferdinand VII, was the wife of the Portuguese prince regent, but had her own political projects. As she avoided the later capture of the Spanish royal family, she attempted to take charge of the viceroyalty as regent. This political project, known as Carlotism, sought to prevent a French invasion of the Americas. A small secret society of criollos, composed of politicians such as Manuel Belgrano and Juan José Castelli, and military leaders such as Antonio Beruti and Hipólito Vieytes, supported this project. They considered it an opportunity to get a local government instead of a European one, or a step towards a potential declaration of independence. The project was resisted by Viceroy Liniers, most peninsulars, and some criollos, including Cornelio Saavedra and the lawyers Mariano Moreno and Juan José Paso. They suspected that it concealed Portuguese expansionist ambitions over the region. The supporters of Carlota Joaquina intended her to head a constitutional monarchy, whereas she wanted to govern an absolute monarchy; these conflicting goals undermined the project and led to its failure. Britain, which had a strong influence in the politics of the Portuguese Empire, opposed the project as well: they did not want Spain split into several kingdoms, and considered Carlota Joaquina unable to prevent this.

== Prelude ==
=== Liniers government ===
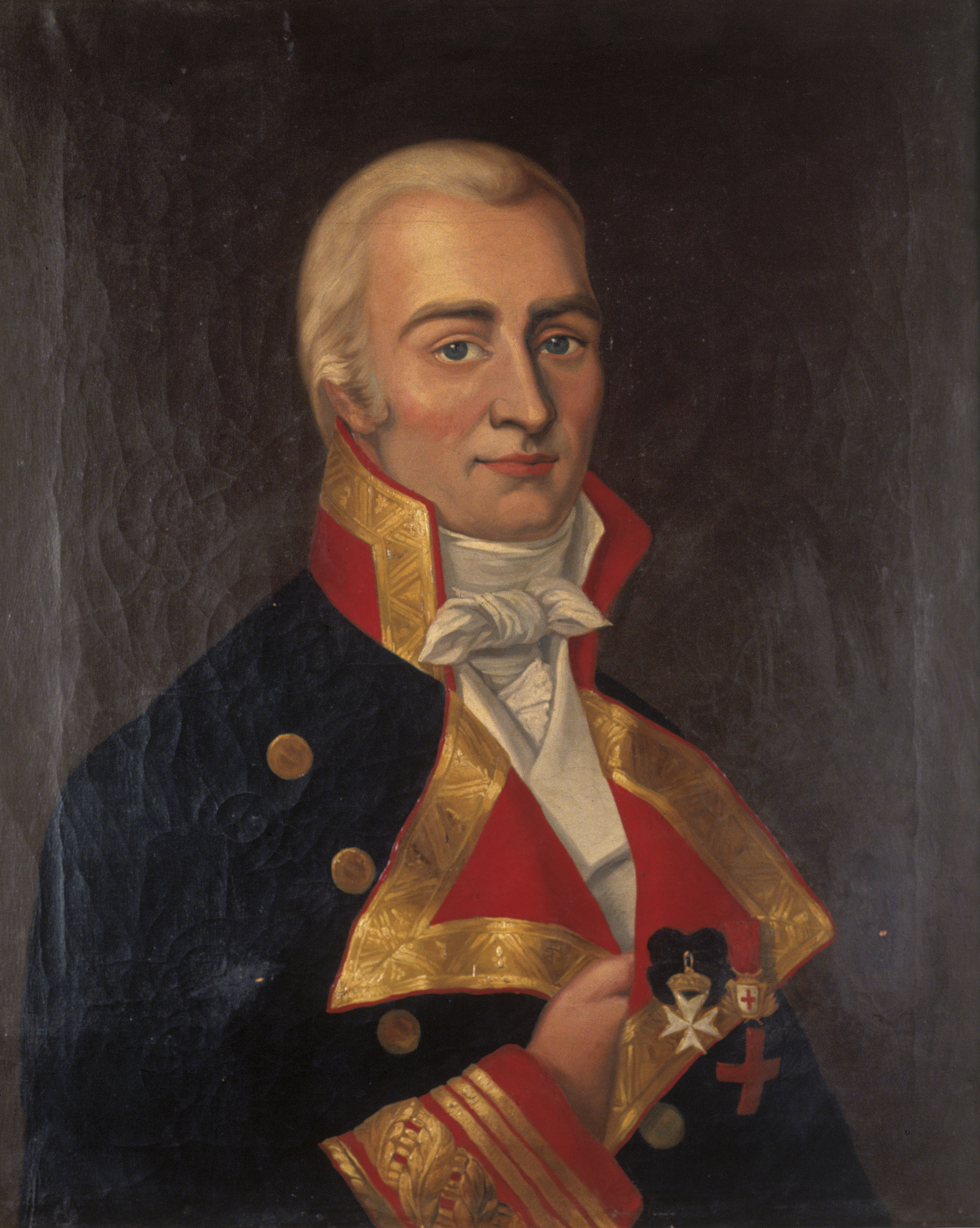
Santiago de Liniers ruled as viceroy between 1807 and 1809

After the British invasion of 1806, Santiago de Liniers successfully reconquered Buenos Aires. The population did not allow Rafael de Sobremonte to continue as Viceroy. He had escaped to Cordoba with the public treasury while the battle was still in progress. A law enacted in 1778 required the treasury to be moved to a safe location in the case of a foreign attack, but Sobremonte was still seen as a coward by the population. The Royal Audiencia of Buenos Aires did not allow his return to Buenos Aires and elected Liniers, acclaimed as a popular hero, as an interim Viceroy. This was an unprecedented action, the first time that a Spanish viceroy was deposed by local government institutions, and not by the King of Spain himself; King Charles IV ratified the appointment at a later time. Liniers armed the entire population of Buenos Aires, including criollos and slaves, and defeated a second British invasion attempt in 1807.

The Liniers administration was popular among criollos, but not among peninsulars such as the merchant Martín de Álzaga and the Governor of Montevideo, Francisco Javier de Elío. They requested the Spanish authorities appoint a new viceroy. In the wake of the outbreak of the Peninsular War, de Elío created the Junta of Montevideo, which would scrutinise all the orders from Buenos Aires and reserve the right to ignore them, but did not openly deny the authority of the Viceroy or declare Montevideo independent.

Martín de Álzaga began a mutiny to remove Liniers. On 1 January 1809, an open cabildo (an extraordinary meeting of vecinos, prominent people of the city) chaired by Álzaga demanded the resignation of Liniers and the appointment of a local junta. The Spanish militia and a group of people summoned by the meeting gathered to support the rebellion. A small number of criollos, notably Mariano Moreno, supported the mutiny, but most of them did not. They felt that Álzaga wanted to remove the Viceroy to avoid his political authority while keeping the social differences between criollos and peninsulars unchanged. The riot was quickly routed when criollo militias led by Cornelio Saavedra surrounded the plaza and dispersed the rebels. As a result of the failed mutiny, the rebel militias were disarmed. This included all peninsular militias, and the power of the criollos increased as a result. The leaders of the plot, with the exception of Moreno, were exiled to Carmen de Patagones. Javier de Elío freed them and gave them political asylum at Montevideo.

=== Cisneros government ===
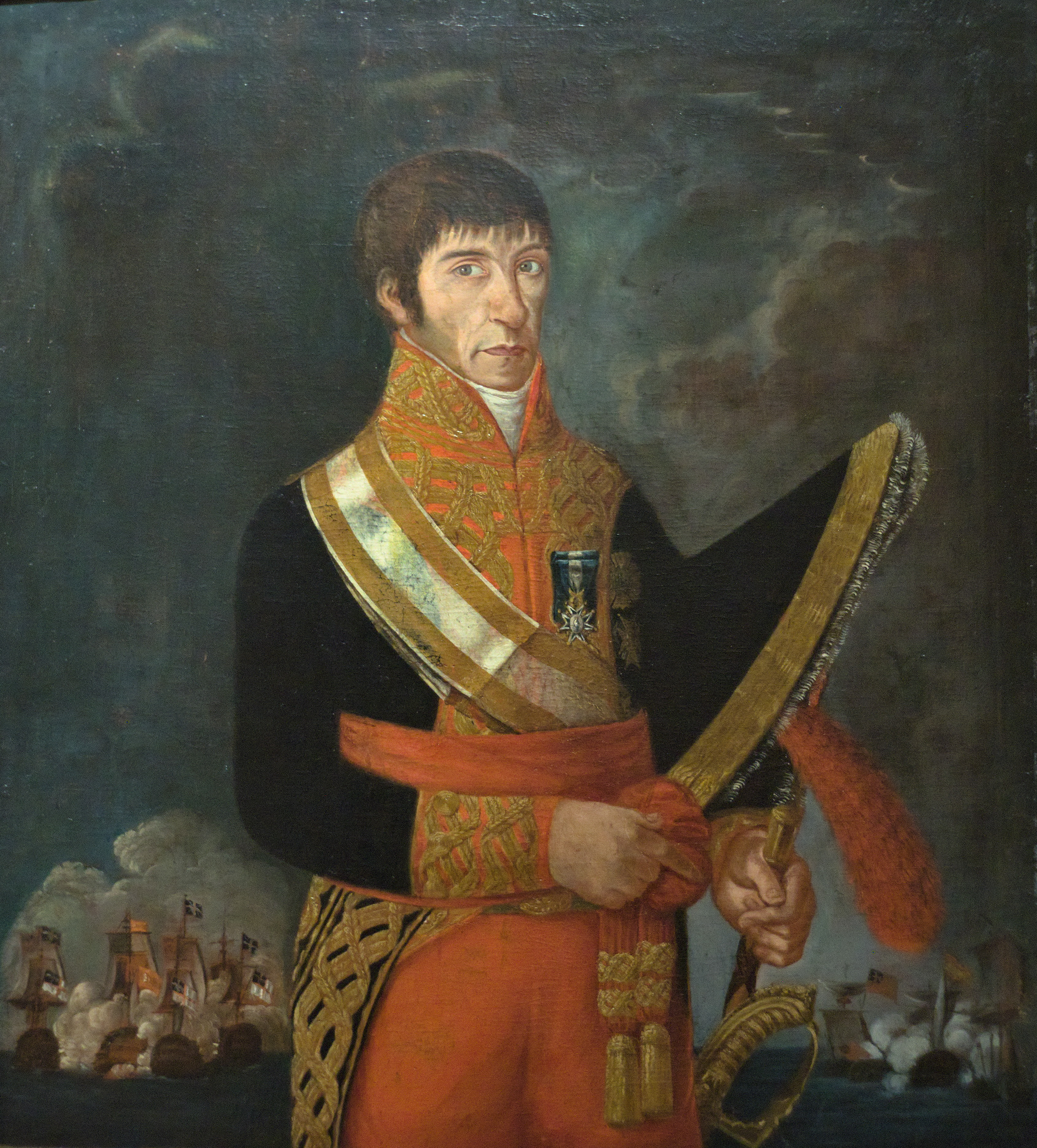
Baltasar Hidalgo de Cisneros, the last viceroy to rule in Buenos Aires

The Supreme Central Junta replaced Liniers with the naval officer Baltasar Hidalgo de Cisneros, a veteran of the Battle of Trafalgar, to end the political turmoil in the Río de la Plata. He arrived in Montevideo in June 1809 for the handover. Manuel Belgrano proposed that Liniers should resist on the grounds that he had been confirmed as Viceroy by a King of Spain, whereas Cisneros lacked such legitimacy. The criollo militias shared Belgrano's proposal, but Liniers handed over the government to Cisneros without resistance. Javier de Elío accepted the authority of the new Viceroy, and dissolved the Junta of Montevideo. Cisneros rearmed the disbanded peninsular militias, and pardoned those responsible for the mutiny. Álzaga was not freed, but his sentence was commuted to house arrest.

There was concern about events in Spain and about the legitimacy of local governors in Upper Peru as well. On 25 May 1809, the Chuquisaca Revolution deposed Ramón García de León y Pizarro as Governor of Chuquisaca and replaced him with Juan Antonio Alvarez de Arenales. On 16 July, the La Paz revolution, led by Colonel Pedro Domingo Murillo, deposed the Governor of La Paz and elected a new junta. A swift reaction from the Spanish authorities defeated those rebellions. An army of 1,000 men sent from Buenos Aires found no resistance at Chuquisaca, took control of the city and overthrew the Junta. Murillo tried to defend La Paz, but his 800 militiamen were completely outnumbered by the more than 5,000 soldiers sent from Lima. He and the other leaders were later beheaded, and their heads were exhibited as a deterrent. These measures contrasted sharply with the pardon that Martín de Álzaga and others had received after a short time in prison, and the resentment of criollos against the peninsulars deepened. Juan José Castelli was present at the deliberations of the University of Chuquisaca, where Bernardo Monteagudo developed the Syllogism of Chuquisaca, a legal explanation to justify self-governance. This influenced his ideas during the "May Week".

On 25 November 1809, Cisneros created the Political Surveillance Court to persecute afrancesados (supporters of Joseph Bonaparte) and independentists. However, he rejected economist José María Romero's proposal to banish a number of people considered dangerous to the Spanish regime, such as Saavedra, Paso, Vieytes, Castelli and Moreno, among others. Romero warned Cisneros against spreading news that might be considered subversive. Criollos felt that soon any pretext would be enough to lead to the outbreak of revolution. In April 1810, Cornelio Saavedra advised to his friends: "it's not time yet, let the figs ripen and then we'll eat them". He meant that he would not support rushed actions against the Viceroy, but would do so at a strategically favourable moment, such as when Napoleon's forces gained a decisive advantage in their war against Spain.

== May Week ==
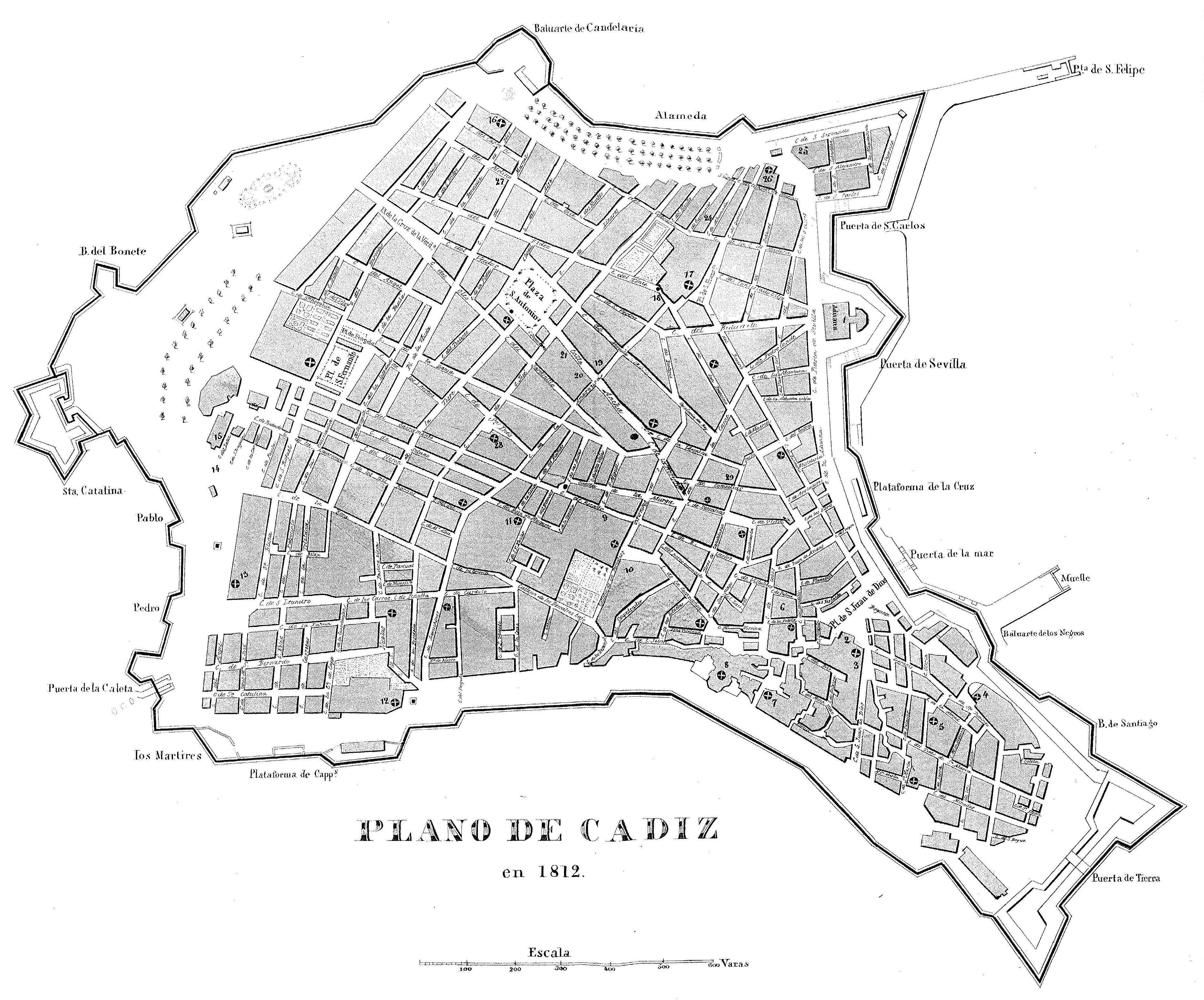
Map of Cádiz made during the French siege

The May Week was the period of time in Buenos Aires which began with the confirmation of the fall of the Supreme Central Junta and ended with the dismissal of Cisneros and the establishment of the Primera Junta. On 14 May 1810, the schooner HMS Mistletoe arrived at Buenos Aires with European newspapers that reported the dissolution of the Supreme Central Junta the previous January. The city of Seville had been invaded by French armies, which were already dominating most of the Iberian Peninsula. The newspapers reported that some of the former members of the Junta had taken refuge on the Isla de León in Cádiz. This was confirmed in Buenos Aires on 17 May, when the British ship John Parish arrived in Montevideo; the most recent newspapers reported that members of the Supreme Central Junta had been dismissed.

The Council of Regency of Cádiz was not seen as a successor of the Spanish resistance but as an attempt to restore absolutism in Spain. The Supreme Central Junta was seen as sympathetic to the new ideas. South American patriots feared both a complete French victory in the peninsula and an absolutist restoration. Cisneros monitored the British ships and seized their newspapers to conceal the news, but a newspaper came into the hands of Belgrano and Castelli. They spread the news among other patriots and challenged the legitimacy of the Viceroy, who had been appointed by the fallen junta. When Cornelio Saavedra, head of the regiment of Patricians, was informed of this news, he decided that it was finally the ideal time to take action against Cisneros. Martín Rodríguez proposed to overthrow the Viceroy by force, but Castelli and Saavedra rejected this idea and proposed the convening of an open cabildo.

=== Friday, 18 May and Saturday, 19 May ===
Although Viceroy Cisneros attempted to conceal the news of the Spanish defeat, the rumour had already spread throughout Buenos Aires. Most of the population was uneasy; there was high activity at the barracks and in the Plaza, and most shops were closed. The "Café de Catalanes" and the "Fonda de las Naciones", frequent criollo meeting places, became venues for political discussions and radical proclamations; Francisco José Planes shouted that Cisneros should be hanged in the Plaza as retribution for the execution of the leaders of the ill-fated La Paz revolution. People who sympathized with the absolutist government were harassed, but the fights were of little consequence because nobody was allowed to take muskets or swords out of the barracks.

The Viceroy, trying to calm the criollos, gave his own version of events in a proclamation. He asked for allegiance to King Ferdinand VII, but popular unrest continued to intensify. He was aware of the news, but only said that the situation on the Iberian Peninsula was delicate; he did not confirm the fall of the Junta. His proposal was to make a government body that would rule on behalf of Ferdinand VII, together with Viceroy of Peru José Fernando de Abascal y Sousa, Governor of Potosí Francisco de Paula Sanz and President of the Royal Audiencia of Charcas Vicente Nieto.

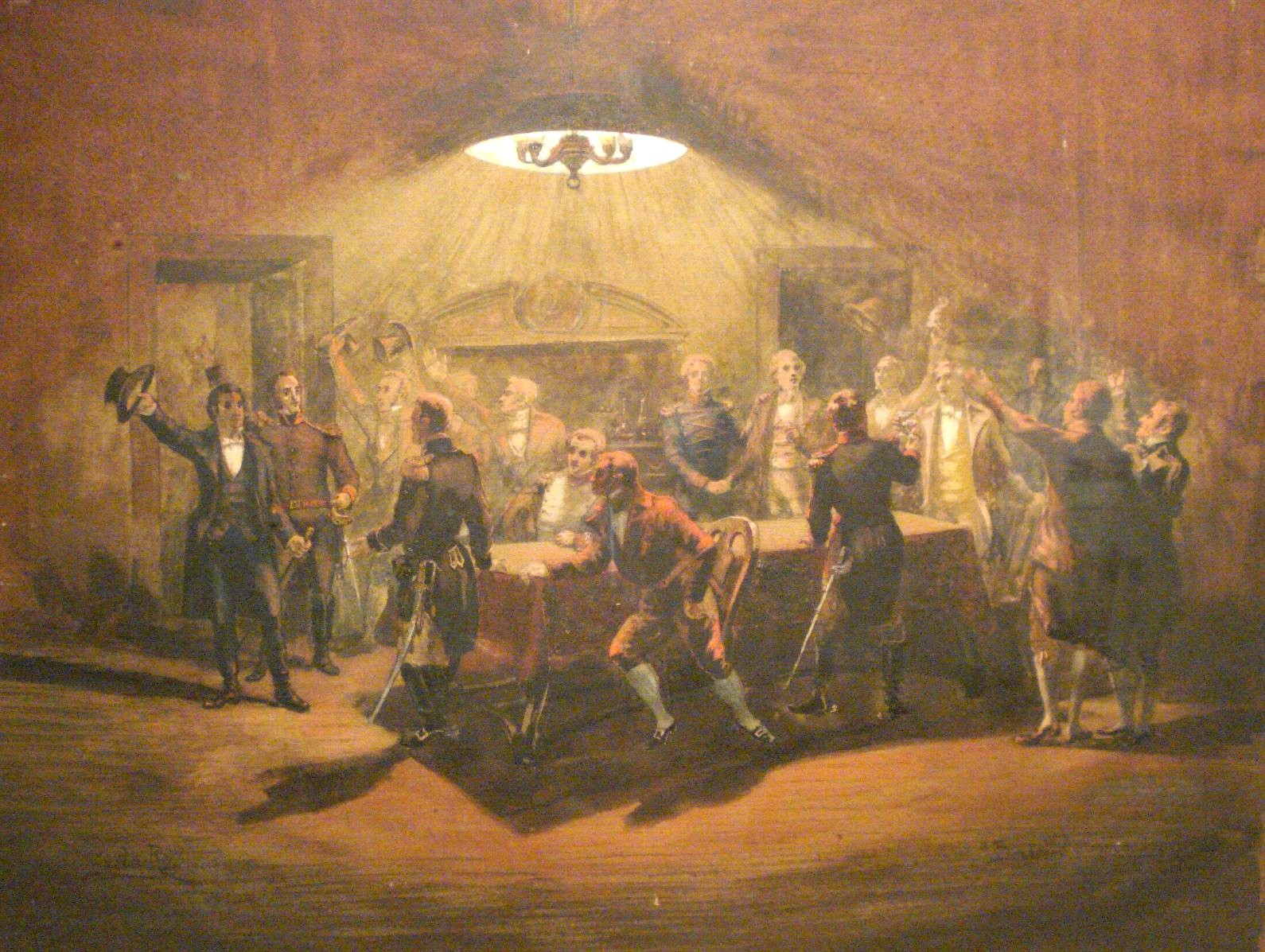
Secret meeting of the revolutionaries at the house of Nicolás Rodríguez Peña

Not fooled by the Viceroy's communiqué, some criollos met at the houses of Nicolás Rodríguez Peña and Martín Rodríguez. During these secret meetings, they appointed a representative commission composed of Juan José Castelli and Martín Rodríguez to request that Cisneros convene an open cabildo to decide the future of the Viceroyalty.

During the night of 19 May there were further discussions at Rodríguez Peña's house. Saavedra, called by Viamonte, joined the meeting, which involved military and civilian leaders. They arranged that Belgrano and Saavedra would meet with Juan José de Lezica, the senior alcalde (municipal magistrate), while Castelli would meet with the procurator Julián de Leiva, to ask for their support. They asked the Viceroy to allow an open cabildo, and said that if it was not freely granted the people and the criollo troops would march to the Plaza, force the Viceroy to resign by any means necessary, and replace him with a patriot government. Saavedra commented to Lezica that he was suspected of betrayal because of his constant requests for cautious and measured steps. This comment was designed to pressure Lezica into speeding up the legal system to allow the people to express themselves, or otherwise risk a major rebellion. Lezica asked for patience and time to persuade the Viceroy, and leave a massive demonstration as a last resort. He argued that if the Viceroy was deposed in that way, it would constitute a rebellion, which would turn the revolutionaries into outlaws. Manuel Belgrano gave the following Monday as the deadline to confirm the open cabildo before taking direct action. Leiva would later act as a mediator, being both a confidante of Cisneros and a trusted negotiator for the more moderate revolutionaries.

=== Sunday, 20 May ===
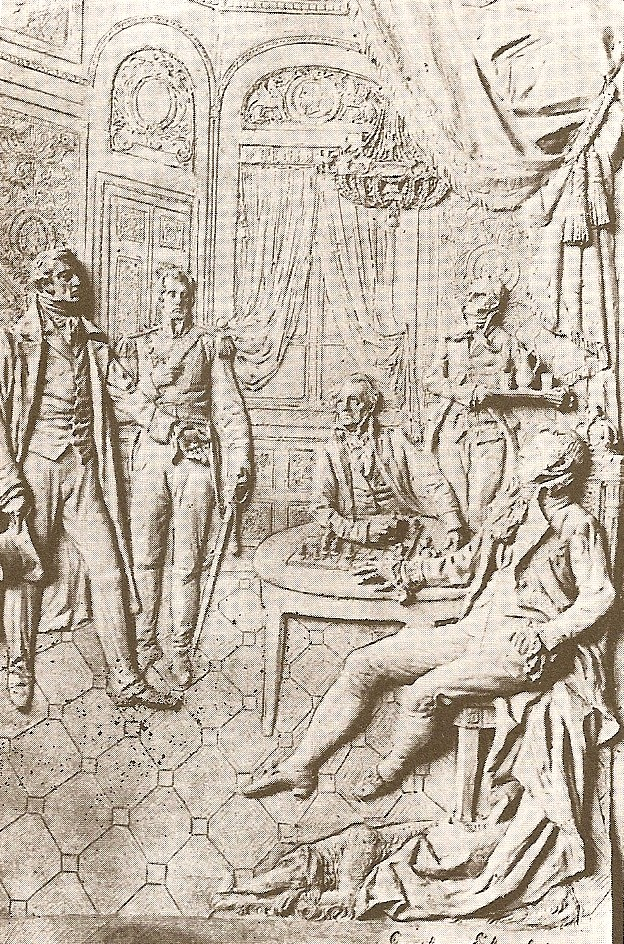
Juan José Castelli asks Baltasar Hidalgo de Cisneros for an open cabildo

Lezica informed Cisneros of the request for an open cabildo and the Viceroy consulted Leiva, who spoke in favour of it. The Viceroy summoned military commanders to come to the fort at 7 pm, to demand military support. There were rumors that it could be a trap to capture them and take control of the barracks. To prevent this, they took command of the grenadiers that guarded the Fort and seized the keys of all entrances while meeting with the Viceroy. Colonel Cornelio Saavedra, head of the Regiment of Patricios, responded on behalf of all the criollo regiments. He compared the current international situation with that prevailing at the time of the mutiny of Álzaga over a year earlier, pointed out that Spain was now almost entirely under Napoleonic control and that the undefeated Spanish provinces were very small in comparison with the Americas. He rejected the claim of sovereignty of Cádiz over the Americas, and concluded that the local armies wanted to look after themselves, rather than following the fate of Spain. Finally, he pointed out that the Supreme Central Junta that appointed Cisneros as Viceroy no longer existed, so he rejected Cisneros' legitimacy as Viceroy and denied him the protection of the troops under his command.

Castelli and Martín Rodríguez moved to the Fort for an interview with Cisneros. Juan Florencio Terrada, commander of the Infantry Grenadiers, joined them, because their barracks were located under Cisneros' window, and his presence would not allow the Viceroy to request military aid to take Castelli and Martín Rodríguez prisoners. The guards let them pass unannounced, and they found Cisneros playing cards with Brigadier Quintana, prosecutor Caspe and aide Coicolea. Castelli and Rodríguez demanded once again the convening of an open cabildo, and Cisneros reacted angrily, considering their request an outrage. Rodríguez interrupted him and forced him to give a definitive answer. After a short private discussion with Caspe, Cisneros reluctantly gave his consent.

That night, many of the revolutionaries attended a theatre production on the theme of tyranny, called Rome Saved. The lead actor was Morante, playing Cicero. The police chief requested Morante to feign illness and not appear, so that the play could be replaced with Misanthropy and Repentance by the German novelist and playwright August von Kotzebue. Rumors of police censorship spread quickly; Morante ignored the request and performed the play as planned. In the fourth act, Morante made a patriotic speech, about the Gaul threat to Rome (the Gauls are ancestors of the French people) and the need for strong leadership to resist the danger. This scene lifted the revolutionaries' spirits and led to frenzied applause. Juan José Paso stood up and cried out for the freedom of Buenos Aires, and a small fight ensued.

After the play, the revolutionaries returned to Peña's house. They learned the result of the meeting with Cisneros, but were unsure as to whether Cisneros intended to keep his word. They organized a demonstration for the following day to ensure that the open cabildo would be held as decided.

=== Monday, 21 May ===
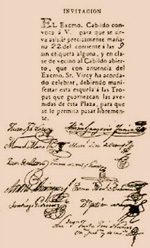
Invitation to the open cabildo of 22 May

At 3 pm, the Cabildo began its routine work, but was interrupted by 600 armed men named the Infernal Legion, who occupied the Plaza de la Victoria and loudly demanded the convening of an open cabildo and the resignation of Viceroy Cisneros. They carried a portrait of Ferdinand VII and the lapels of their jackets bore a white ribbon that symbolized criollo–Spanish unity. Domingo French, the mail carrier of the city, and Antonio Beruti, an employee of the treasury, led the rioters. It was rumored that Cisneros had been killed, and that Saavedra would take control of the government. Saavedra was at the barracks at that moment, concerned about the demonstration. He thought the violence should be stopped and that radical measures such as the assassination of Cisneros should be prevented, but he also thought that the troops would mutiny if the demonstrations were suppressed. The people in the Plaza did not believe that Cisneros would allow the open cabildo the next day. Leiva left the Cabildo, and Belgrano, who was representing the crowd, requested a definitive commitment. Leiva explained that everything would go ahead as planned, but the Cabildo needed time to prepare. He asked Belgrano to help the Cabildo with the work, as his intervention would be seen by the crowd as a guarantee that their demands would not be ignored. The crowd left the main hall but stayed in the Plaza. Belgrano protested about the guest list, which consisted of the wealthiest citizens, and thought that if the poor people were left outside there would be further unrest. The members of the Cabildo tried to convince him to give his support, but he left.

Belgrano's departure enraged the crowd, as he did not explain what had happened, and the people feared a betrayal. Demands for Cisneros' immediate resignation replaced those for an open cabildo. The people finally settled down and dispersed when Saavedra intervened to say that the claims of the Infernal Legion were supported by the military.

The invitations were distributed among 450 leading citizens and officials in the capital. The Cabildo compiled the guest list, and tried to guarantee the result, inviting people that would be likely to support the Viceroy. The revolutionaries countered this move with a similar one, so that most people would be against Cisneros instead. The printer Agustín Donado, supporting the revolutionaries, printed nearly 600 invitations instead of the 450 requested, and distributed the surplus among the criollos. During the night, Castelli, Rodríguez, French and Beruti visited all the barracks to harangue the troops and prepare them for the following day.

=== Tuesday, 22 May ===
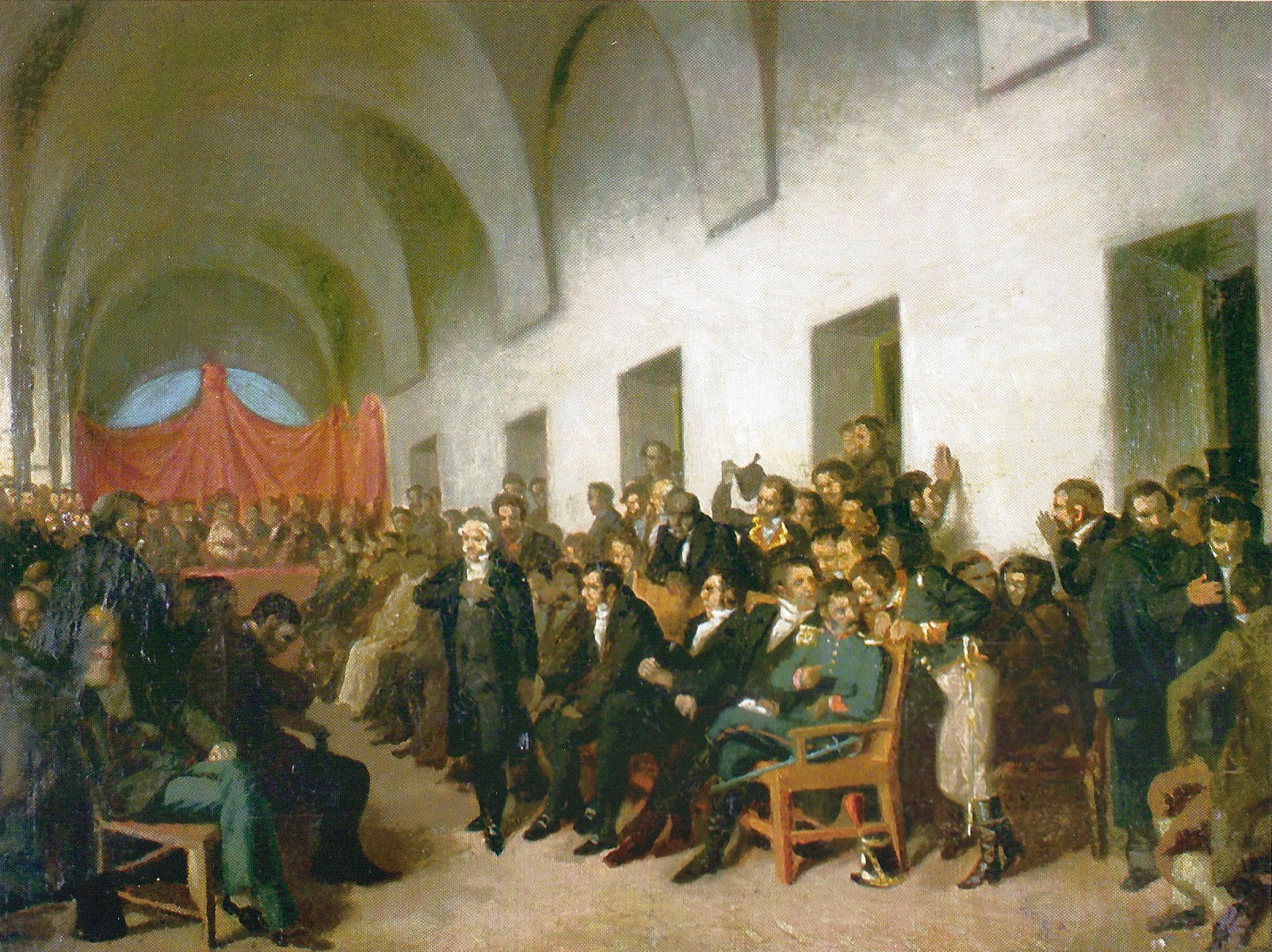
An open cabildo discussed the legitimacy of the viceroy and the new local government that replaced him

According to the minutes, only about 251 out of the 450 officially invited guests attended the open cabildo. French and Beruti, in command of 600 men armed with knives, shotguns and rifles, controlled access to the square to ensure that the open cabildo had a majority of criollos. All noteworthy religious and civilian people were present, as well as militia commanders and many prominent residents. The only notable absence was that of Martín de Álzaga, who was still under house arrest.

A merchant, José Ignacio Rezábal, attended the open cabildo but, in a letter to the priest Julián S. de Agüero, said that he had some doubts which were shared by other people close to him. He feared that, no matter which party prevailed in the open cabildo, it would take revenge against the other, the Mutiny of Álzaga being a recent precedent. He felt that the open cabildo would lack legitimacy if too many criollos were allowed to take part in it as a result of the aforementioned manipulation of the guest list.

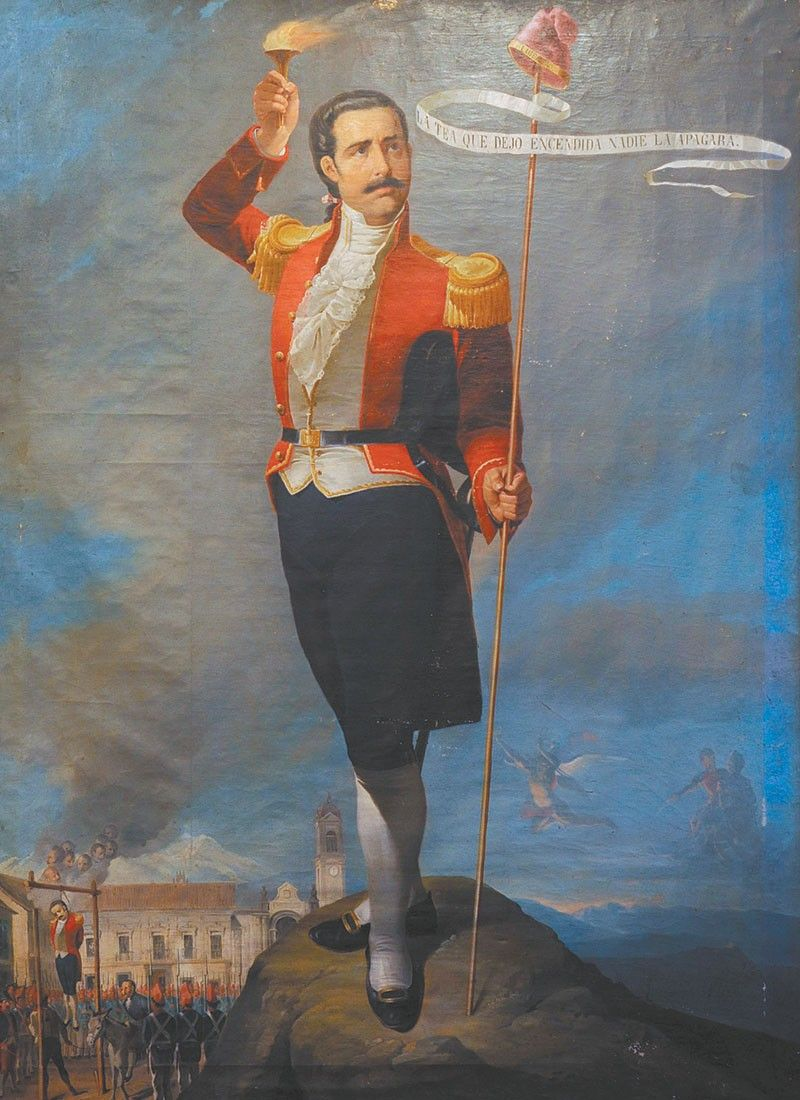
Pedro Murillo (1757–1810)

The meeting lasted from morning to midnight, including the reading of the proclamation, the debate and the vote. There was no secret ballot; votes were heard one at a time and recorded in the minutes. The main themes of the debate were the legitimacy of the government and the authority of the Viceroy. The principle of retroversion of the sovereignty to the people stated that, in the absence of the legitimate monarch, power returned to the people; they were entitled to form a new government. This principle was commonplace in Spanish scholasticism and rationalist philosophy, but had never been applied in case law. Its validity divided the assembly into two main groups: one group rejected it and argued that the situation should remain unchanged; this group supported Cisneros as Viceroy. The other group supported change, and considered that they should establish a junta, like the ones established in Spain to replace the Viceroy. There was also a third position, taking the middle ground. The promoters of change did not recognize the authority of the Council of Regency, and argued that the colonies in America were not consulted in its formation. The debate tangentially discussed the rivalry between criollos and peninsulars; the Viceroy supporters felt that the will of peninsulars should prevail over that of criollos.

One of the speakers for the first position was the bishop of Buenos Aires, Benito Lue y Riega, leader of the local church, who said:

Not only is there no reason to get rid of the Viceroy, but even if no part of Spain remained unsubdued, the Spaniards in America ought to take it back and resume command over it. America should only be ruled by the natives when there is no longer a Spaniard there. If even a single member of the Central Junta of Seville were to land on our shores, we should receive him as the Sovereign.

Juan José Castelli was the main speaker for the revolutionaries. He based his speech on two key ideas: the government's lapsed legitimacy—he stated that the Supreme Central Junta was dissolved and had no rights to designate a Regency—and the principle of retroversion of sovereignty. He spoke after Riega, and replied that the American people should assume control of their government until Ferdinand VII could return to the throne.

Nobody could call the whole nation a criminal, nor the individuals that have aired their political views. If the right of conquest belongs by right to the conquering country, it would be fair for Spain to quit resisting the French and submit to them, by the same principles for which it is expected that the Americans submit themselves to the peoples of Pontevedra. The reason and the rule must be equal for everybody. Here there are no conquerors or conquered; here there are only Spaniards. The Spaniards of Spain have lost their land. The Spaniards of America are trying to save theirs. Let the ones from Spain deal with themselves as they can; do not worry, we American Spaniards know what we want and where we go. So I suggest we vote: that we replace the Viceroy with a new authority that will be subject to the parent state if it is saved from the French, and independent if Spain is finally subjugated.

Pascual Ruiz Huidobro stated that, since the authority that appointed Cisneros had expired, Cisneros should no longer have a place in the government. Huidobro felt that the Cabildo should be in government, as it was the representative of the people. Melchor Fernández, Juan León Ferragut and Joaquín Grigera supported his vote, among others.

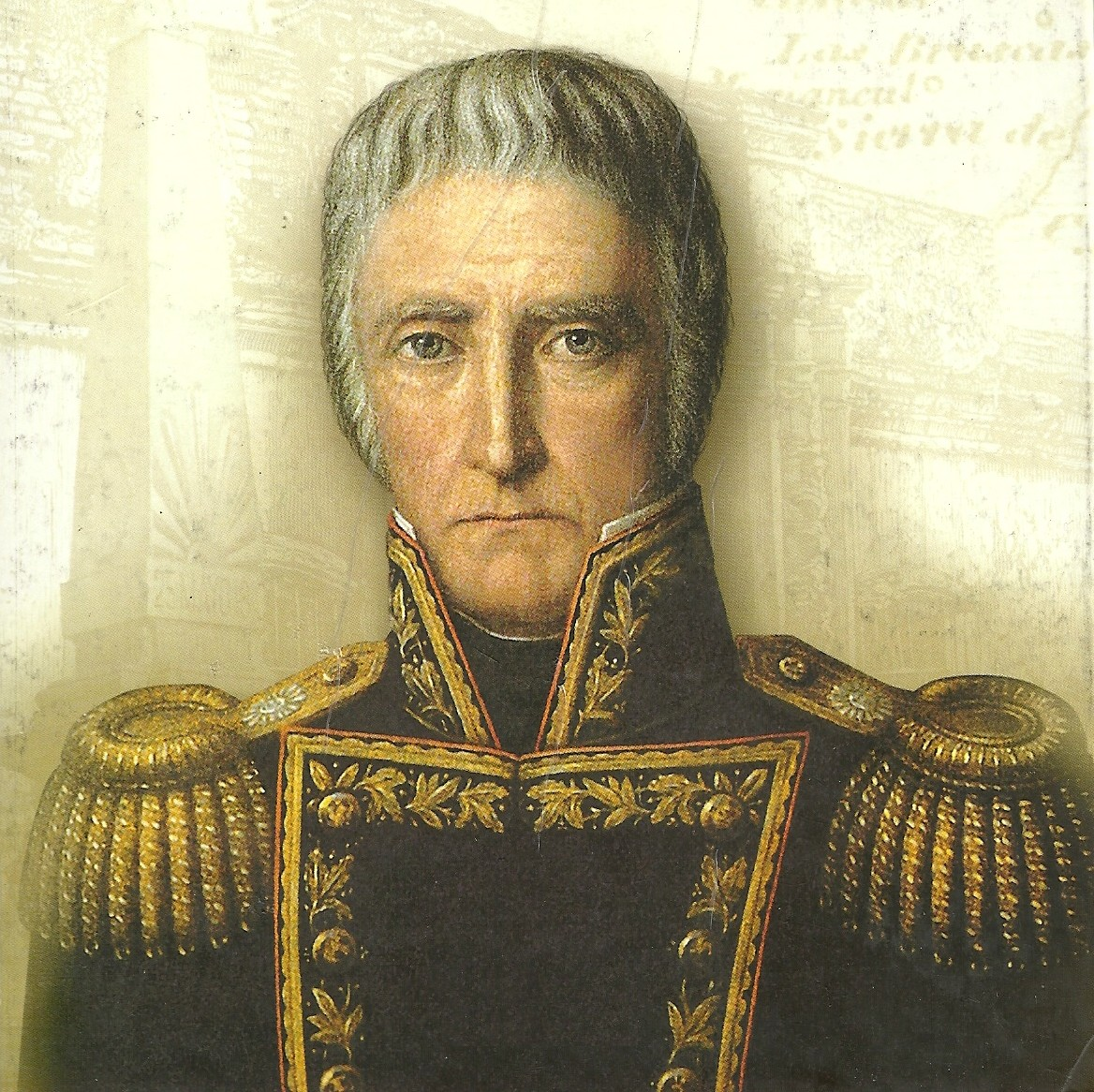
The proposal of Cornelio Saavedra (1759–1829) received the most votes

Attorney Manuel Genaro Villota, representative of the Spanish, said that the city of Buenos Aires had no right to make unilateral decisions about the legitimacy of the Viceroy or the Council of Regency without the participation of other cities of the Viceroyalty. He argued that such an action would break the unity of the country and establish as many sovereignties as there were cities. His intention was to keep Cisneros in power by delaying any possible action. Juan José Paso accepted his first point, but argued that the situation in Europe and the possibility that Napoleon's forces could conquer the American colonies demanded an urgent resolution. He then expounded the "argument of the elder sister", reasoning that Buenos Aires should take the initiative and make the changes deemed necessary and appropriate, on the express condition that the other cities would be invited to comment as soon as possible. The rhetorical device of the "elder sister", comparable to negotiorum gestio, makes an analogy between the relationship of Buenos Aires and other cities of the viceroyalty with a sibling relationship.

The priest Juan Nepomuceno Solá then proposed that the Cabildo should receive the provisional command, until the formation of a governing junta made up of representatives from all populations of the Viceroyalty. Manuel Alberti, Miguel de Azcuénaga (who would be members of the Primera Junta some days later), Escalada and Argerich (or Aguirre) supported his vote, among others.

Cornelio Saavedra suggested that the Cabildo should receive the provisional command until the formation of a governing junta in the manner and form that the Cabildo would deem as appropriate. He said "...there shall be no doubt that it is the people that create authority or command." At the time of the vote, Castelli's position coincided with that of Saavedra.

Manuel Belgrano stood near a window and, in the event of a problematic development, he would give a signal by waiving a white cloth, upon which the people gathered in the Plaza would force their way into the Cabildo. However, there were no problems and this emergency plan was not implemented. The historian Vicente Fidel López revealed that his father, Vicente López y Planes, who was present at the event, saw that Mariano Moreno was worried near the end in spite of the majority achieved. Moreno told Planes that the Cabildo was about to betray them.

=== Wednesday, 23 May ===
The debate took all day, and the votes were counted very late that night. After the presentations, people voted for the continuation of the Viceroy, alone or at the head of a junta, or his dismissal. The ideas explained were divided into a small number of proposals, designated with the names of their main supporters, and the people then voted for one of those proposals. The voting lasted for a long time, and the result was to dismiss the Viceroy by a large majority: 155 votes to 69.

Manuel José Reyes stated that he found no reason to depose the Viceroy, and that it would be enough to appoint a junta headed by Cisneros. His proposal had nearly 30 votes. Another 30 votes supported Cisneros, with no change to the political system. A small group supported the proposal of Martín José de Choteco, who also supported Cisneros.

There were also many different proposals involving the removal of Cisneros. Many of them required the new authorities to be elected by the Cabildo. Pascual Ruiz Huidobro proposed that the Cabildo should rule in the interim and appoint a new government, but this proposal made no reference to popular sovereignty or the creation of a junta. This proposal received 35 votes, and sought simply to replace Cisneros with Huidobro: Huidobro was the most senior military officer, and thus the natural candidate under current laws to replace the viceroy in the lack of a new appointment from Spain. Juan Nepomuceno Solá proposed a junta composed of delegates from all the provinces of the viceroyalty, while the Cabildo should govern in the interim; this proposal received nearly 20 votes. Cornelio Saavedra, whose aforementioned proposal was that the Cabildo should appoint a Junta and rule in the interim, got the largest number of votes. A number of other proposals received only a few votes each.

At dawn on 23 May, the Cabildo informed the population that the Viceroy would end his mandate. The highest authority would be transferred temporarily to the Cabildo until the appointment of a governing junta. Notices were placed at various points throughout the city, which announced the imminent creation of a junta and the summoning of representatives from the provinces. The notices also called for the public to refrain from actions contrary to public policy.

=== Thursday, 24 May ===
The Cabildo interpreted the decision of the open cabildo in its own way. When it formed the new Junta to govern until the arrival of representatives from other cities, Leiva arranged for former viceroy Cisneros to be appointed president of the Junta and commander of the armed forces. There are many interpretations of his motives for departing from the decision of the open cabildo in this way. Four other members were appointed to the Junta: criollos Cornelio Saavedra and Juan José Castelli, and peninsulars Juan Nepomuceno Solá and José Santos Inchaurregui.

Leiva wrote a constitutional code to regulate the actions of the Junta. It stipulated that the Junta could not exercise judicial power, which was reserved for the Royal Audiencia of Buenos Aires; that Cisneros could not act without the support of the other members of the Junta; that the Cabildo could dismiss anyone who neglected his duty; that the Cabildo's consent would be required to create new taxes; that the Junta would sanction a general amnesty for those who had aired opinions at the open cabildo; and that the Junta would invite the other cities to send delegates. The commanders of the armed forces, including Saavedra and Pedro Andrés García, agreed to this code. The Junta swore the oath of office that afternoon.

These developments shocked the revolutionaries. Unsure of what to do next, they feared that they would be punished, like the revolutionaries of Chuquisaca and La Paz. Moreno abjured relations with the others and shut himself in his home. There was a meeting at Rodríguez Peña's house. They felt that the Cabildo would not pursue such a plot without the blessing of Saavedra and that Castelli should resign from the Junta. Tagle took a different view: he thought that Saavedra may have accepted out of weakness or naivety and that Castelli should stay in the Junta to counter the others' influence on him. Meanwhile, a mob led by Domingo French and Antonio Beruti filled the Plaza. The stability of Cisneros in power, albeit in an office other than Viceroy, was seen as an insult to the will of the open cabildo. Colonel Martín Rodriguez warned that, if the army were to commit support to a government that kept Cisneros, they would soon have to fire on the people, and that they would revolt. He said that "everyone without exception" demanded the removal of Cisneros.

That night, Castelli and Saavedra informed Cisneros of their resignation from the newly formed Junta. They explained that the population was on the verge of violent revolution and would remove Cisneros by force if he did not resign as well. They warned that they did not have the power to stop that: neither Castelli to stop his friends, nor Saavedra to prevent the Regiment of Patricians from mutiny. Cisneros wanted to wait for the following day, but they said that there was no time for further delays, so he finally agreed to resign. He sent a resignation letter to the Cabildo for consideration on the following day. Chiclana felt encouraged when Saavedra resigned, and started to request signatures for a manifesto about the will of the people. Moreno refused any further involvement, but Castelli and Peña trusted that he would eventually join them if events unfolded as they expected.

=== Friday, 25 May ===
The people gathered in front of the Buenos Aires Cabildo

On the morning of 25 May, in spite of bad weather, a crowd gathered in the Plaza de la Victoria, as did the militia led by Domingo French and Antonio Beruti. They demanded the recall of the Junta elected the previous day, the final resignation of Cisneros, and the appointment of a new junta that did not include him. Historian Bartolomé Mitre stated that French and Beruti distributed blue and white ribbons, similar to the modern cockade of Argentina, among those present. Later historians doubt it, but consider it possible that the revolutionaries used distinctive marks of some kind for identification. It was rumored that the Cabildo might reject Cisneros' resignation. Because of delays in issuing an official resolution, the crowd became agitated, clamoring that "the people want to know what is going on!".

The Cabildo met at 9 am and rejected Cisneros' resignation. They considered that the crowd had no legitimate right to influence something that the Cabildo had already decided and implemented. They considered that, as the Junta was in command, the demonstration should be suppressed by force, and made the members responsible for any changes to the resolution of the previous day. To enforce those orders, they summoned the chief commanders, but these did not obey. Many of them, including Saavedra, did not appear. Those that did stated that they could not support the government order, and that the commanders would be disobeyed if they ordered the troops to repress the demonstrators.

The crowd's agitation increased, and they overran the chapter house. Leiva and Lezica requested that someone who could act as spokesman for the people should join them inside the hall and explain the people's desires. Beruti, Chiclana, French and Grela were allowed to pass. Leiva attempted to discourage the rioter Pancho Planes, but he entered the hall as well. The Cabildo argued that Buenos Aires had no right to break the political system of the viceroyalty without discussing it with the other provinces; French and Chiclana replied that the call for a Congress had already been considered. The Cabildo called the commanders to deliberate with them. As had happened several times in the last few days, Romero explained that the soldiers would mutiny if forced to fight against the rioters on behalf of Cisneros. The Cabildo still refused to give up, until the noise of the demonstration was heard in the hall. They feared that the demonstrators could overrun the building and reach them. Martín Rodríguez pointed out that the only way to calm the demonstrators was to accept Cisneros' resignation. Leiva agreed, convinced the other members, and the people returned to the Plaza. Rodríguez headed to Azcuenaga's house to meet the other revolutionaries to plan the final stages of the revolution. The demonstration overran the Cabildo again, and reached the hall of deliberations. Beruti spoke on behalf of the people, and said that the new Junta should be elected by the people and not by the Cabildo. He said that, besides the nearly 400 people already gathered, the barracks were full of people who supported them, and he threatened that they would take control, by force if necessary. The Cabildo replied by requesting their demands in writing.

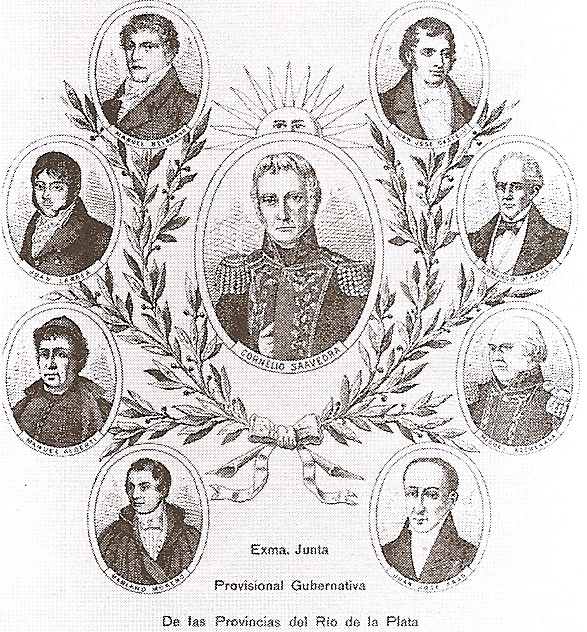
Members of the Primera Junta

After a long interval, a document containing 411 signatures was delivered to the Cabildo. This paper proposed a new composition for the governing Junta, and a 500-man expedition to assist the provinces. The document—still preserved—listed most army commanders and many well-known residents, and contained many illegible signatures. French and Beruti signed the document, stating "for me and for six hundred more". However, there is no unanimous view among historians about the authorship of the document. Meanwhile, the weather improved and the sun broke through the clouds. The people in the plaza saw it as a favourable omen for the revolution. The Sun of May was created a few years later with reference to this event.

The Cabildo accepted the document and moved to the balcony to submit it directly to the people for ratification. But, because of the late hour and the weather, the number of people in the plaza had declined. Leiva ridiculed the claim of the remaining representatives to speak on behalf of the people. This wore the patience of the few who were still in the plaza in the rain. Beruti did not accept any further delays, and threatened to call people to arms. Facing the prospect of further violence, the popular request was read aloud and immediately ratified by those present.

The Primera Junta was finally established. It was composed by president Cornelio Saavedra, members Manuel Alberti, Miguel de Azcuénaga, Manuel Belgrano, Juan José Castelli, Domingo Matheu and Juan Larrea, and secretaries Juan José Paso and Mariano Moreno. The rules governing it were roughly the same as those issued the day before, with the additional provisions that the Cabildo would watch over the members of the Junta and that the Junta itself would appoint replacements in case of vacancies. Saavedra spoke to the crowd, and then moved on to the Fort, among salvos of artillery and the ringing of bells. Meanwhile, Cisneros dispatched a post rider to Córdoba, Argentina, to warn Santiago de Liniers about what had happened in Buenos Aires and to request military action against the Junta.

== Aftermath ==
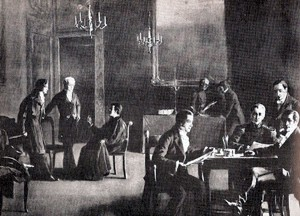
The Primera Junta ruled after the revolution

Buenos Aires endured the whole Spanish American Wars of independence without being reconquered by royalist armies or successful royalist counter-revolutions. However, it faced several internal conflicts. The May Revolution lacked a clear leader as other regions of Latin America; the secretary Mariano Moreno led the initial phase of the government, but he was removed shortly afterwards.

The Council of Regency, the Royal Audiencia of Buenos Aires and the peninsulars opposed the new situation. The Royal Audiencia secretly swore allegiance to the Council of Regency a month later and sent communiqués to the other cities of the Viceroyalty, to request them to deny recognition to the new government. To put an end to these activities, the Junta assembled Cisneros and all the members of the Royal Audiencia on the pretext that their lives were in danger, and sent them into exile aboard the merchantman Dart. Captain Mark Brigut was instructed to avoid American ports and deliver all of them directly to the Canary Islands. The Junta then appointed a new Audiencia composed entirely of criollos loyal to the revolution.

Every city in the territory of modern Argentina other than Córdoba endorsed the Primera Junta. The cities of the Upper Peru, however, did not take a position, owing to the recent outcomes of the Chuquisaca and La Paz Revolutions. Asunción del Paraguay rejected the Junta and swore loyalty to the Council of Regency. The Banda Oriental, under Francisco Javier de Elío, remained a royalist stronghold.

Former Viceroy Santiago de Liniers organized a counter-revolution in Córdoba, and this became the first military campaign of the independent government. Despite the importance of Liniers himself, and his prestige as a popular hero for his role during the British invasions, the population of Córdoba preferred to support the revolution. This reduced the power of the counter-revolutionary army by means of desertions and sabotage. Liniers's troops were quickly defeated by the forces led by Francisco Ortiz de Ocampo. Ocampo refused to shoot the captive Liniers; hence the execution ordered by the Junta was carried out by Juan José Castelli. After the victory, the Primera Junta sent military expeditions to many other cities, to demand support and the election of representatives to it.

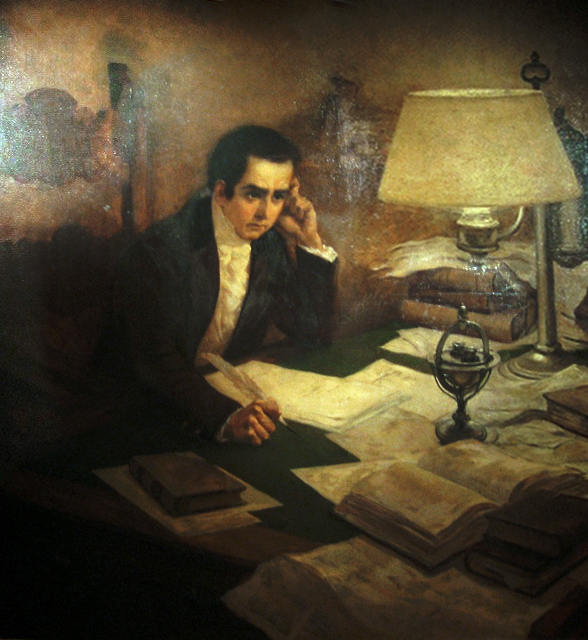
Mariano Moreno (1778–1811), an influential member of the Primera Junta

Montevideo, which had a historical rivalry with Buenos Aires, opposed the Primera Junta and the Council of Regency declared it the new capital of the Viceroyalty, along with Francisco Javier de Elío as the new Viceroy. The city was well defended, so it could easily resist an invasion. Peripheral cities in the Banda Oriental acted contrary to Montevideo's will and supported the Buenos Aires Junta. José Gervasio Artigas led them, and kept Montevideo under siege. The final defeat of the Montevidean royalists was carried out in 1814 by Carlos María de Alvear and William Brown.

The Captaincy General of Chile followed a process analogous to that of the May Revolution, and elected a Government Junta that inaugurated the brief period known as Patria Vieja. The Junta was defeated in 1814 at the Battle of Rancagua, and the subsequent Reconquista of Chile would make it a royalist stronghold once more. The Andes provided an effective natural barrier between the Argentine revolutionaries and Chile, so there was no military confrontation between them until the Crossing of the Andes, led by José de San Martín in 1817, a campaign that resulted in the defeat of the Chilean royalists.

The Primera Junta increased in size when it incorporated the representatives sent by the provinces. From then on, the Junta was renamed the Junta Grande. It was dissolved shortly after the June 1811 defeat of the Argentine troops at the Battle of Huaqui, and two successive triumvirates exercised executive power over the United Provinces of the Río de la Plata. In 1814, the second triumvirate was replaced by the authority of the Supreme Director. Meanwhile, Martín Miguel de Güemes contained the royalist armies sent from the Viceroyalty of Peru at Salta, while San Martín advanced towards the royalist stronghold of Lima by sea, on a Chilean–Argentine campaign. The war for independence gradually shifted towards northern South America. From 1814, Argentina descended into civil war.

=== Consequences ===
According to historian Félix Luna's Breve historia de los Argentinos (Spanish: Brief history of the Argentines), one of the most important societal consequences of the May Revolution was the shift in the way the people and its rulers related. Until then, the conception of the common good prevailed: while royal authority was fully respected, if an instruction from the crown of Spain was considered detrimental to the common good of the local population, it was half-met or simply ignored. With the revolution, the concept of common good gave way to that of popular sovereignty, as theorized by Moreno, Castelli and Monteagudo, among others. This idea held that, in the absence of a legitimate authority, the people had the right to appoint their own leaders. Over time, popular sovereignty would give way to the idea of majority rule. This maturation of ideas was gradual, taking many decades to crystallize into stable electoral and political systems, but it was what ultimately led to the adoption of the republican system as the form of government for Argentina. Domingo Faustino Sarmiento stated similar views in his Facundo, and noted that cities were more receptive to republican ideas, while rural areas were more resistant to them, which led to the surge of caudillos.

Another consequence, also according to Luna, was the dissolution of the Viceroyalty of the Río de la Plata into several different units. Most of the cities and provinces had distinctive populations, economies, attitudes, contexts, and interests. Until the revolution, all of these peoples were held together by the authority of the Spanish government, but with its disappearance, people from Montevideo, Paraguay and the Upper Peru began to distance themselves from Buenos Aires. The brief existence of the Viceroyalty of the Río de la Plata, which had lasted barely 38 years, impeded the consolidation of a patriotic feeling and failed to bring a sense of community to all of the population. The new country of Argentina lacked an established concept of national identity capable to unite the population under a common idea of statehood. Juan Bautista Alberdi sees the May Revolution as one of the early manifestations of the power struggles between the city of Buenos Aires and the provinces—one of the axial conflicts at play in the Argentine civil wars. Alberdi wrote in his book "Escritos póstumos":

The revolution of May 1810 in Buenos Aires, intended to win the independence of Argentina from Spain, also had the consequence of emancipating the province of Buenos Aires from Argentina or, rather, of imposing the authority of this province upon the whole nation emancipated from Spain. That day, Spanish power over the Argentine provinces ended and that of Buenos Aires was established.

== Historical perspectives ==
Historiographical studies of the May Revolution do not face many doubts or unknown details. Most of the information was properly recorded at the time and was made available to the public by the Primera Junta as patriotic propaganda. Because of this, historical views on the topic differ in their interpretations of the meanings, causes and consequences of the events, rather than in the accuracy of their depiction of the events themselves. The modern version of events does not differ significantly from the contemporary one.

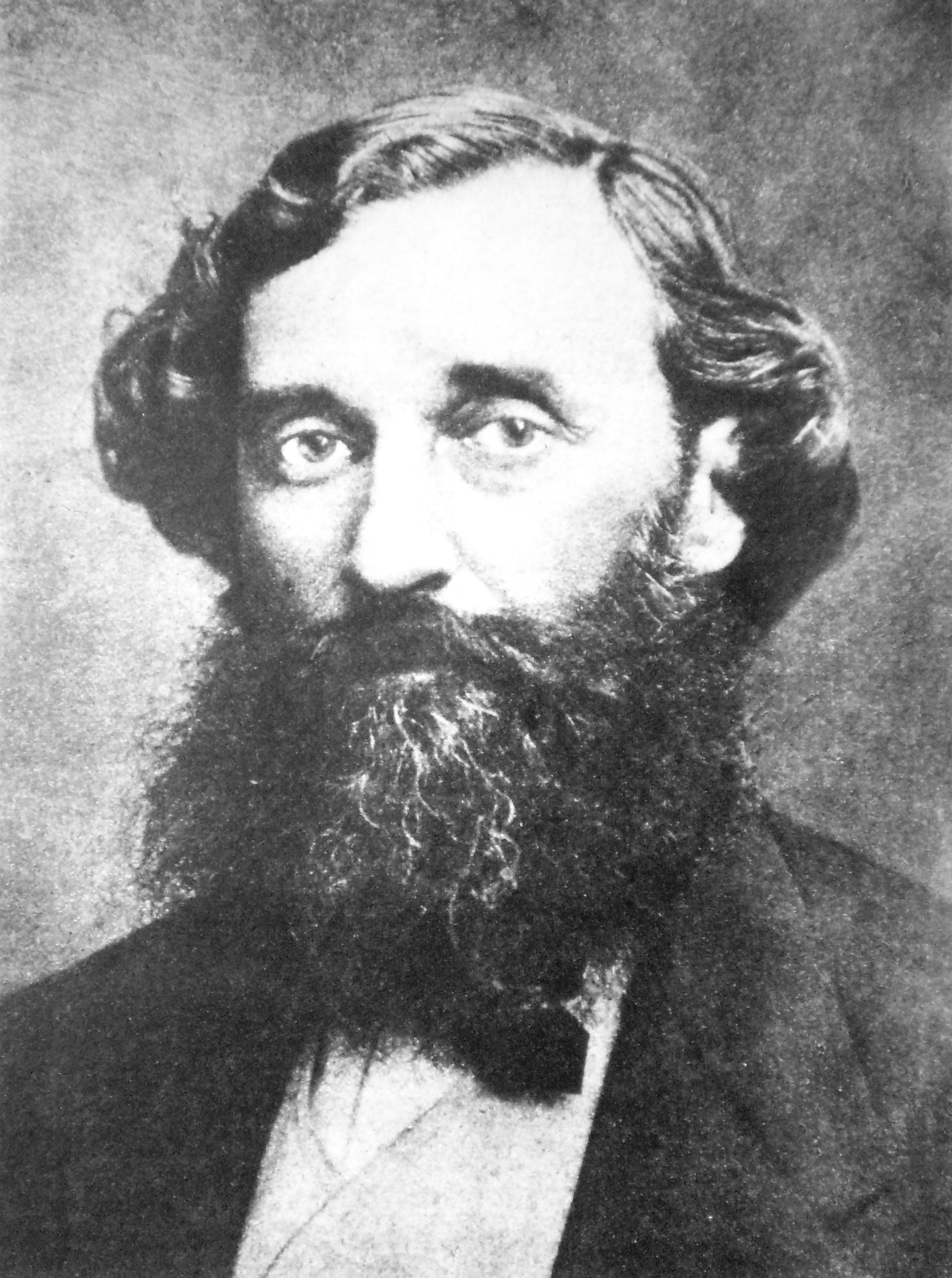
Bartolomé Mitre (1821–1906) authored one of the first historical interpretations of the May Revolution

The first people to write about the May Revolution were participants who wrote memoirs, biographies and diaries. However, their works were motivated by purposes other than historiographic ones, such as to explain the reasons for their actions, clean their public images, or express their support or rejection of the public figures and ideas of the time. For example, Manuel Moreno wrote the biography of his brother Mariano as propaganda for the revolutions in Europe, and Cornelio Saavedra wrote his autobiography at a moment when his image was highly questioned, to justify himself to his sons.

The first remarkable historiographical school of interpretation of the history of Argentina was founded by members of the 1837 generation, including Bartolomé Mitre. Mitre regarded the May Revolution as an iconic expression of political egalitarianism: a conflict between modern freedoms and oppression represented by the Spanish monarchy, and an attempt to establish a national organization on constitutional principles as opposed to the charismatic authority of the caudillos. These authors' views were treated as canonical until the end of the 19th century, when the proximity of the centennial encouraged authors to seek new perspectives. The newer authors would differ about the relative weight of the causes of the May Revolution and about whose intervention in the events was more decisive, but the main views expressed by Mitre were kept, such as to consider the revolution to be the birth of modern Argentina and an unavoidable event. These authors introduced the idea of popular intervention as another key element. By the time of the World Wars, liberal authors attempted to impose an ultimate and unquestionable historical perspective; Ricardo Levene and the Academia Nacional de la Historia were exponents of this tendency, which still kept most perspectives of Mitre. Left-wing authors took a revisionist view based on nationalism and anti-imperialism; they minimized the dispute between criollos and peninsulars and portrayed events as a dispute between enlightenment and absolutism. However, most of their work was focused on other historical periods.

The May Revolution was not the product of the actions of a single political party with a clear and defined agenda, but a convergence of sectors with varying interests. Thus, there are a number of conflicting perspectives about it, because different authors highlight different aspects. Mitre, for example, referred to The Representation of the Landowners (an 1809 economic report by Mariano Moreno) and the role of the merchants to support the view that the May Revolution intended to obtain free trade and economic integration with Europe; right-wing revisionists centre around Saavedra and the social customs of the time to describe the revolution under conservative principles; and left-wing revisionists use the example of Moreno, Castelli and the rioters led by French and Beruti to describe it as a radical revolution.

=== Revolutionary purposes ===
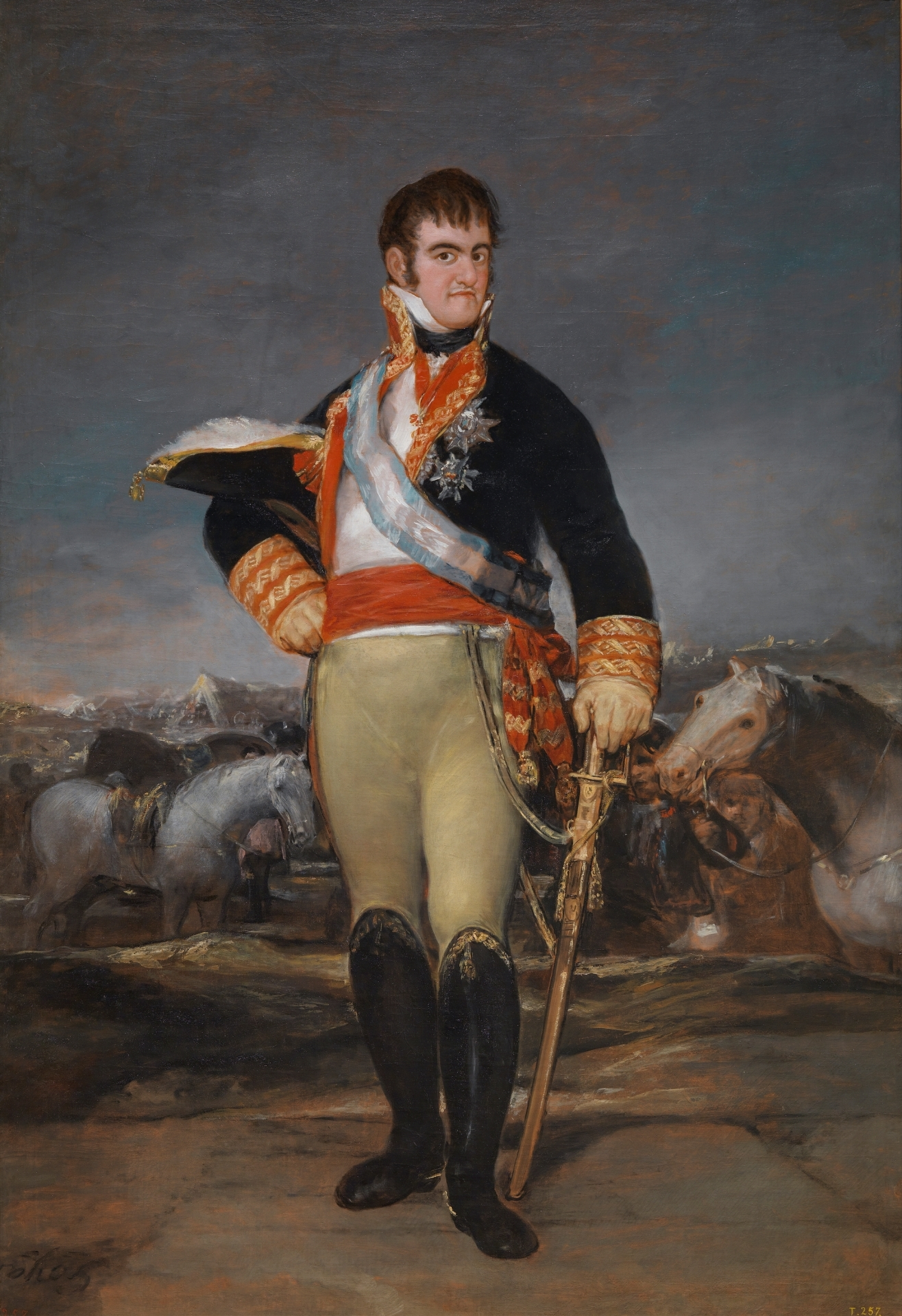
The revolutionaries of the May Revolution declared loyalty to Ferdinand VII of Spain

The government created on 25 May pronounced itself loyal to the deposed King of Spain Ferdinand VII, but historians disagree on whether this was sincere or not. Since Mitre, many historians think that this professed loyalty was merely a political deception to gain autonomy. The Primera Junta did not pledge allegiance to the Council of Regency, which was still in operation, and in 1810 it still seemed unlikely that Napoleon would be defeated and Ferdinand returned to the throne (which finally happened on 11 December 1813, with the Treaty of Valençay). The purpose of such a deception would have been to gain time to strengthen the position of the patriotic cause and avoid reactions that may have led to a counter-revolution, by making it appear that monarchical authority was still respected and that no revolution had taken place. The ruse is known as the "Mask of Ferdinand VII". It was upheld by the Primera Junta, the Junta Grande and the First Triumvirate. The Assembly of Year XIII was intended to declare independence, but failed to do so because of other political conflicts between its members. However, it suppressed mention of Ferdinand VII in official documents. Before the declaration of independence of 1816, the supreme directors considered other options, such as to negotiate with Spain or become a British protectorate.

The change was potentially favourable for Britain, as trade with the cities of the area was facilitated, without the monopoly that Spain had maintained over their colonies for centuries. However, Britain's first priority was the war against France in Europe, and as such they could not be publicly seen to support Latin American independence movements or allow the military attention of Spain to be divided onto two different fronts. Consequently, they directed the various movements to temporarily avoid explicit demonstrations. These efforts were primarily by handled by Lord Strangford, the British ambassador at the court of Rio de Janeiro; he expressed support for the Junta, but under the condition that "...the behaviour is consistent, and that [the] Capital [is] retained on behalf of Mr. Dn. Ferdinand VII and his legitimate successors". Later conflicts between Buenos Aires, Montevideo and Artigas led to political disputed in Europe, between Strangford and the Portuguese regent John VI of Portugal.

Juan Bautista Alberdi and later historians such as Norberto Galasso, Luis Romero and José Carlos Chiaramonte doubted Mitre's interpretation and put forward different ones. Alberdi thought that "the Argentine revolution is a chapter of the Hispanoamerican revolution, as also of the Spanish one, as also of the French and European one". They did not consider it a dispute between independentism and colonialism, but instead a dispute between new libertarian ideas and absolutism. The intention was not to cut ties with Spain, but to reformulate the relationship; similarly, the American Revolution was not separatist at its initial steps either. Thus, it would have the characteristics of a civil war instead. Some points that would justify the idea would be the inclusion of Larrea, Matheu, and Belgrano in the Junta and the later appearance of José de San Martín: Larrea and Matheu were Spanish, Belgrano studied for many years in Spain, and San Martín had spent most of his adult life waging war in Spain against the French. When San Martín talked about enemies, he called them "royalists" or "Goths", but never "Spanish".

According to those historians, the Spanish revolution against absolutism got mixed up with the Peninsular War. When Ferdinand VII stood against his father Charles IV, who was seen as an absolutist king, many Spaniards got the mistaken impression that he sympathized with the new enlightened ideas. Thus, the revolutions made in the Americas in the name of Ferdinand VII (such as the May Revolution, the Chuquisaca Revolution, or the one in Chile) would have sought to replace absolutist power with power formulated under the new ideas. Even if Spain was at war with France, the ideals of the French Revolution (liberty, equality and fraternity) were still respected. Those revolutions pronounced themselves enemies of Napoleon, but did not face any active French military attack; they promoted instead fights between Spanish armies for keeping either the old or new order. This situation would change with the final defeat of Napoleon and the return of Ferdinand VII to the throne, as he began the Absolutist Restoration and persecuted the supporters of the new libertarian ideas within Spain. For people in South America, to stay as a part of the Spanish Empire, but with a new relationship with the mother country, was no longer a feasible option: the only remaining options at this point were to return to absolutism or to adopt independentism.

== Legacy ==
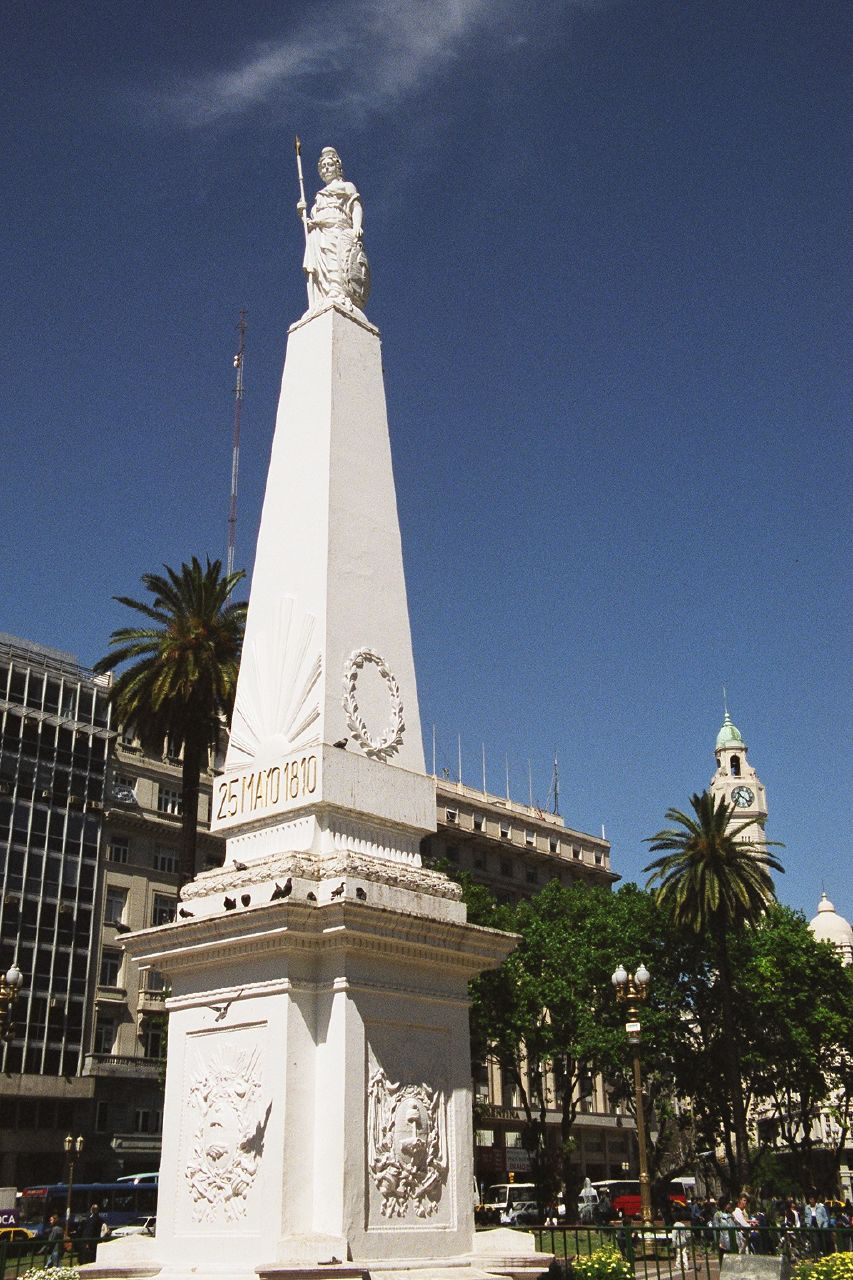
The May Pyramid, commemorative monument at Plaza de Mayo

25 May is a national day in Argentina, known as First Patriotic Government, with the character of a public holiday. The public holiday is set by law 21.329 and is always celebrated on 25 May, regardless of the day of the week. The Argentina Centennial and the Argentina Bicentennial were celebrated in 1910 and 2010.

25 May was designated as a patriotic date in 1813, but the Argentine Declaration of Independence suggests 9 July as an alternative national day. At first this added to the conflicts between Buenos Aires and the provinces during the Argentine Civil War, because the date in May related to Buenos Aires and the date of 9 July related to the whole country. Thus the unitarian Bernardino Rivadavia canceled the celebration of 9 July, and the federalist Juan Manuel de Rosas allowed it again, but maintained the May celebrations. By 1880, the federalization of Buenos Aires removed the local connotations and the May Revolution was considered the birth of the nation.

The date, as well as a generic image of the Buenos Aires Cabildo, are used in different variants to honour the May Revolution. Two of the most notable are the Avenida de Mayo and the Plaza de Mayo in Buenos Aires, near the location of the Cabildo. The May Pyramid was erected in the Plaza a year after the revolution, and was rebuilt in its present form in 1856. Veinticinco de Mayo ("25 May") is the name of several administrative divisions, cities, public spaces and landforms of Argentina. There are departments of this name in the provinces of Chaco, Misiones, San Juan, Río Negro and Buenos Aires, the latter holding the town of Veinticinco de Mayo. The cities of Rosario (Santa Fe), Junín (Buenos Aires) and Resistencia (Chaco) have eponymous squares. King George Island, which is claimed by Argentina, Britain and Chile, as part of the Argentine Antarctica, the British Antarctic Territory and the Chilean Antarctic Territory respectively, is referred to as Isla 25 de Mayo in Argentina.

A representation of a cabildo is used on Argentine 25-cent coins, and an image of the Sun of May appears on the 5-cent coin. An image of the Cabildo during the Revolution appeared on the back of the 5-peso banknote of the former peso moneda nacional.

== See also ==
- Chuquisaca Revolution
- La Paz revolution

== Bibliography ==
- Abad de Santillán, Diego (1965). Historia Argentina [History of Argentina] (in Spanish). Buenos Aires: TEA (Tipográfica Editora Argentina). OCLC 1880672.
- "Actas capitulares desde el 21 hasta el 25 de Mayo de 1810, en Buenos Aires". Actas Capitulares. Buenos Aires cabildo. 23 May 1810.
- Alberdi, Juan Bautista (1962). Grandes y pequeños hombres del Plata [Great and Puny Men from the Plata Basin] (in Spanish). Buenos Aires: Fernández Blanco.
- Archer, Christon (2000). The Wars of Independence in Spanish America. Wilmington, DE: SR Books. ISBN 978-0-8420-2469-3.
- Bethell, Leslie (1987). The Independence of Latin America. New York: Cambridge University Press. ISBN 978-0-521-34927-7.
- Brown, Christopher Leslie (2006). Arming Slaves: From Classical Times to the Modern Age. New Haven, Conn.: Yale University. ISBN 978-0-300-10900-9.
- Chasteen, John Charles (2008). Americanos: Latin America's Struggle for Independence. New York: Oxford University Press. ISBN 978-0-19-517881-4.
- Chávez, Fermín (August 16, 1995). "La historia poco conocida de San Martín". La Maga (Interview) (in Spanish). Interviewed by Felipe Pigna. Buenos Aires. Archived from the original on September 27, 2011.
- Crow, John (1946). The Epic of Latin America (Fourth ed.). Berkeley, Calif.: University of California Press. ISBN 978-0-520-03776-2.
- Cuhaj, George (2011). Standard Catalog of World Paper Money: Modern Issues 1961–Present. Iola, Wis.: Krause Publications. ISBN 978-1-4402-1584-1.
- De Titto, Ricardo (2010). Hombres de Mayo [Men of May] (in Spanish). Buenos Aires: Grupo Editorial Norma. ISBN 978-987-545-584-9.
- Dómina, Esteban (2003). Historia mínima de Córdoba [Basic History of Córdoba] (in Spanish). Córdoba, Argentina: Ediciones del Boulevard. ISBN 978-987-556-023-9.
- Fonrouge (2009). Galasso, Norberto; Pigna, Felipe (November 2009). "El deber de reescribir la historia". 2010 (Interview) (in Spanish). Interviewed by Juan Manuel Fonrouge. Buenos Aires. Archived from the original on March 27, 2012.
- Fremont-Barnes, Gregory (2002). The Napoleonic Wars: The Peninsular War 1807–1814. Oxford: Osprey Publishing. ISBN 978-1-84176-370-5.
- Galasso, Norberto (2005). La Revolución de Mayo (El pueblo quiere saber de qué se trató) [The May Revolution (The People Want to Know What Was It All About)] (in Spanish). Buenos Aires: Ediciones del pensamiento nacional. ISBN 978-950-581-798-6.
- Gelman, Jorge; Raúl Fradkin (2010). Doscientos años pensando la Revolución de Mayo [Two Hundred Years Thinking About the May Revolution] (in Spanish). Buenos Aires: Editorial Sudamericana. ISBN 978-950-07-3179-9.
- Guiñazú, Enrique Ruiz (1937). Lord Strangford y la revolución de mayo [Lord Strangford and the May Revolution] (in Spanish). Buenos Aires: Libreria y Editorial "La Facultad," Bernabé y cía.
- Halperín Donghi, Tulio (1999). Historia contemporánea de América Latina [Contemporary History of Latin America] (in Spanish) (6th ed.). Buenos Aires: Alianza. ISBN 978-950-40-0019-8.
- Johnson, Lyman (2011). Workshop of Revolution: Plebeian Buenos Aires and the Atlantic World, 1776–1810. Durham, North Carolina: Duke University Press. ISBN 978-0822349815.
- Kaufmann, William (1951). British Policy and the Independence of Latin America, 1804–1828. London: Frank Cass and Company. ISBN 978-0-7146-1110-5.
- López, Vicente (1966). La gran semana de 1810 [The Great Week of 1810] (in Spanish). Buenos Aires: Librería del Colegio [sic].
- Luna, Félix (1994). Breve historia de los Argentinos [Brief History of the Argentines] (in Spanish). Buenos Aires: Planeta/Espejo de la Argentina. ISBN 978-950-742-415-1.
- ——— (1999). Grandes protagonistas de la Historia Argentina: Cornelio Saavedra [Great Peoples of the History of Argentina: Cornelio Saavedra] (in Spanish). Buenos Aires: Grupo Editorial Planeta. ISBN 978-950-49-0725-1.
- ——— (2001). Grandes protagonistas de la Historia Argentina: Juan José Castelli [Great Peoples of the History of Argentina: Juan José Castelli] (in Spanish). Buenos Aires: Grupo Editorial Planeta. ISBN 978-950-49-0656-8.
- ——— (2004). Grandes protagonistas de la Historia Argentina: Manuel Belgrano [Great Peoples of the History of Argentina: Manuel Belgrano] (in Spanish). Buenos Aires: Grupo Editorial Planeta. ISBN 978-950-49-1247-7.
- ——— (2004). Grandes protagonistas de la Historia Argentina: Mariano Moreno [Great Peoples of the History of Argentina: Mariano Moreno] (in Spanish). Buenos Aires: La Nación. ISBN 978-950-49-1248-4.
- ——— (1999). Grandes protagonistas de la Historia Argentina: Santiago de Liniers [Great Peoples of the History of Argentina: Santiago de Liniers] (in Spanish). Buenos Aires: Grupo Editorial Planeta. ISBN 978-950-49-0357-4.
- Luna, Félix (2003). La independencia argentina y americana [The Argentine and American History] (in Spanish). Buenos Aires: Edition Planeta. ISBN 978-950-49-1110-4.
- Mantoux, Paul (2006). The Industrial Revolution in the Eighteenth Century. London: Routledge. ISBN 978-0-415-37839-0.
- Mitre, Bartolomé (2008). Historia de Belgrano y de la Independencia Argentina [History of Belgrano and the Independence of Argentina] (in Spanish). Buenos Aires: Belgranian National Institute. ISBN 978-987-506-142-2.
- Moses, Bernard (1926). The Intellectual Background of the Revolution in South America 1810–1824. New York: Hispanic Society of America. ISBN 978-1-4067-1575-0.
- Pigna, Felipe (2007). Los mitos de la historia argentina [The Myths of the History of Argentina] (in Spanish) (26th ed.). Buenos Aires: Grupo Editorial Normax. ISBN 978-987-545-149-0.
- Poli Gonzalvo, Alejandro (2008). Mayo, la revolución inconclusa [May, the Unfinished Revolution]. Buenos Aires: Emecé Editores S.A. ISBN 978-950-04-3030-2.
- Sarmiento, Domingo (2003). Facundo: Civilization and Barbarism. Berkeley, Calif.: University of California Press. ISBN 978-0-520-08159-8.
- Scenna, Miguel Ángel (2009). Mariano Moreno (in Spanish). Buenos Aires: H. Garetto Editor. ISBN 978-987-1494-05-4.
- Shumway, Nicolas (1991). The Invention of Argentina. Berkeley, Calif.: University of California Press. ISBN 978-0-520-08284-7.
- Sigal, Silvia (2010). "Mayo, la disputa por el sentido". Ñ (343): 11.
- Siles Salinas, Jorge (2009). Historia de la independencia de Bolivia [History of the Independence of Bolivia] (in Spanish). La Paz, Bolivia: Plural editores. ISBN 978-99954-1-223-4.
