= ¡El pueblo quiere saber de qué se trata! =

Spanish-language phrase from Argentina

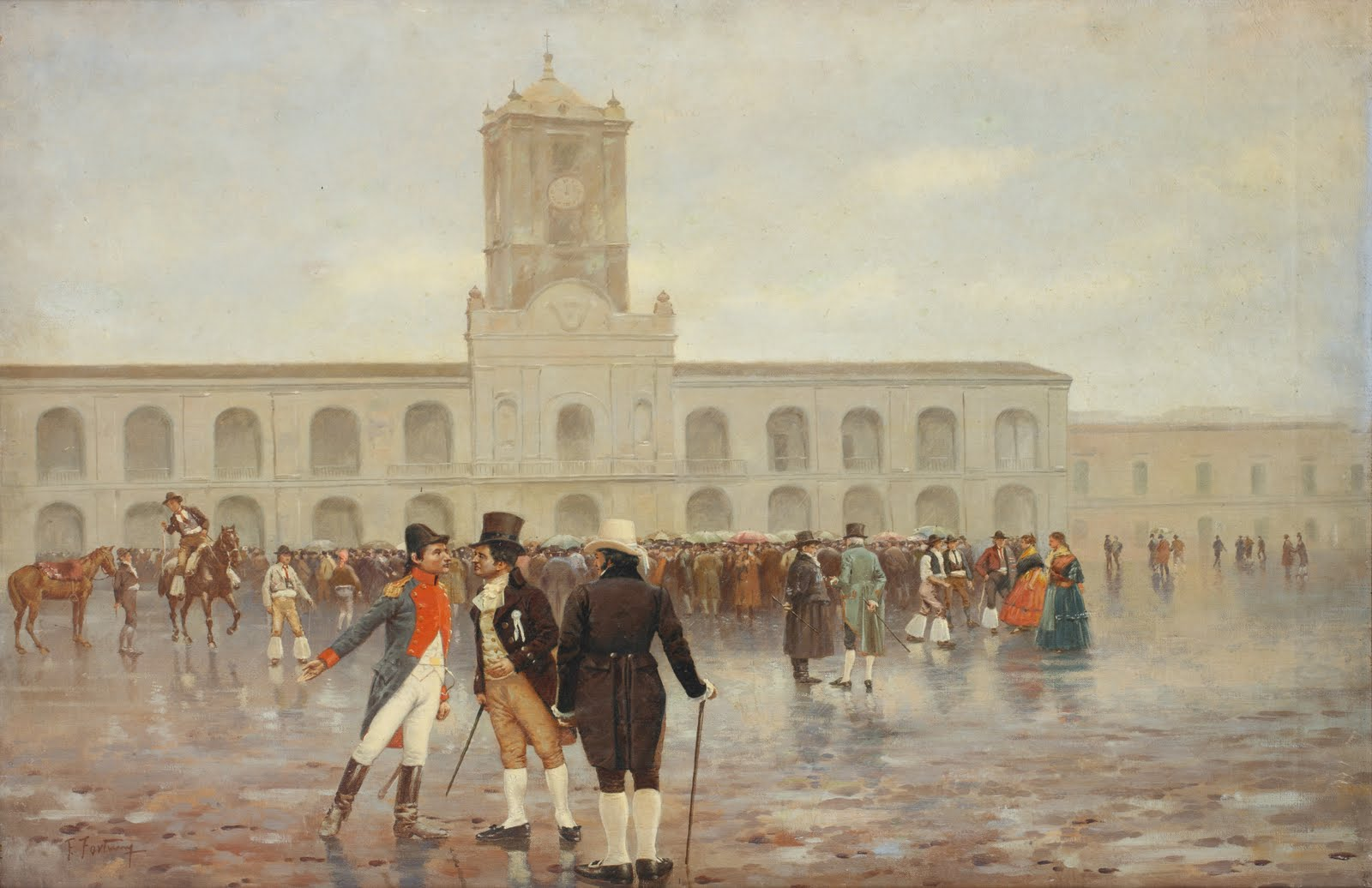
The May Revolution

¡El pueblo quiere saber de qué se trata! ("The people want to know what is going on!") is an anonymous Spanish-language phrase from Argentina. It was first used during the May Revolution, the event that began the Argentine War of Independence. An open cabildo on 22 May 1810 deposed the viceroy Baltasar Hidalgo de Cisneros and ordered the establishment of a government junta, but the cabildo appointed the viceroy as the president of said junta. A huge demonstration forced the cabildo to undo the appointment, and establish instead a junta with members selected by the people.

Similarly to the event, it would be used in Argentine politics when the people requested transparency to the acts of government.
