= Ramón García de León y Pizarro =

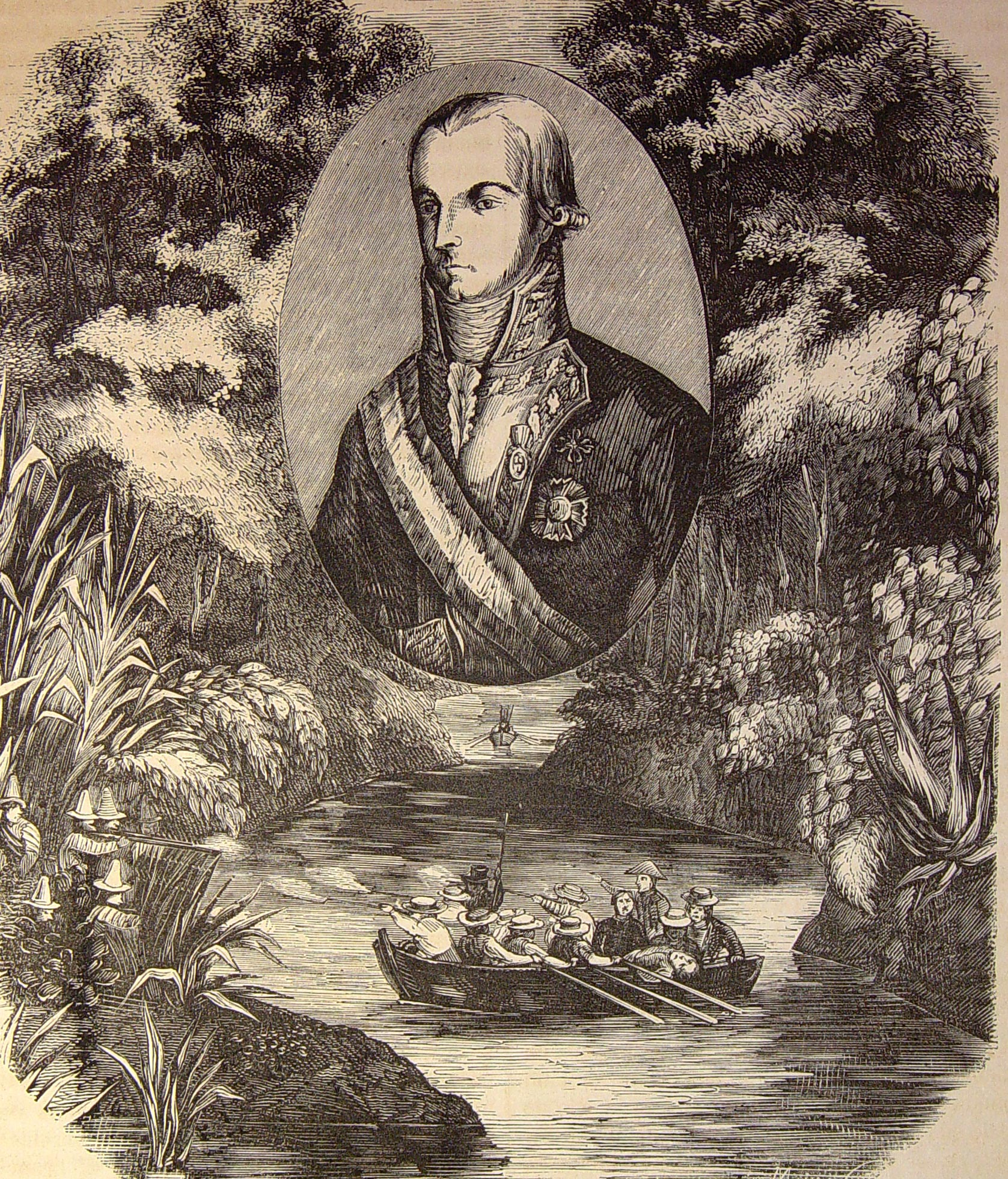
Ramón García de León, first marquis of Casa Pizarro

Ramón García de León y Pizarro (born Oran, now Algeria, 1745; died Charcas, Bolivia, December 1815), was a Spanish military officer and administrator. As president of the Real Audiencia of Charcas, he governed the Intendancy of Chuquisaca during the final colonial years of Upper Peru. He was also the founder of the city San Ramón de la Nueva Orán, in the north of present-day Argentina.

== Origins and early career ==
Coat of Arms de Ramón García de León y Pizarro, I Marquis of House Pizarro y I Viscount of the New Oran.

Born to Jose Garcia de Leon and Francisca Rivera Pizarro Madrigal and Santamarina in the African city of Oran in the days when it was part of the Spanish Empire. He descended from a military family and nobles of Grandees of Spain. His nephew José García de León y Pizarro was president of Quito between 1778 and 1784 . He became Marquis of Casa Pizarro and Viscount of La Nueva Oran. He was related to the Duke of Cadiz and Count of Arcos County by his ancestor Rodrigo Ponce de León.

He joined the army, and made his career in the wars against the Muslims of North Africa. He made several maps of the North African coasts. He came to America in the year 1771, served in the garrison of Cartagena de Indias, and was governor of Riohacha. He later became governor of the Governorate of Maynas, after the expulsion of its founders, the Jesuits. He was also governor of the territory of Mompox, dedicated mainly to demarcate the border with Portugal in the area of the Marañón River.

In 1779, he obtained the government of Guayaquil, in which he was appointed governor of Guayaquil, standing out for its efficient government, and the modernization of the fortifications of the port. He held the Captaincy General in the Spanish colonies of Upper Peru and was promoted to the rank of Army general.

== Foundation of New Oran ==
In March 1789 he was appointed governor of the province of Salta, the second governor of that province, after its separation from Tucumán . He was sworn in Buenos Aires, after crossing the province without holding office. Back, he made a long visit to the interior of the province, so he just took office in December 1791 . Just arrived, he paid a visit to the eastern border of the province, the most exposed to attacks by the Indians of Gran Chaco, especially by the Wichí and the Guaraní people, known by the Spanish as Chiriguanos .

Excited about the possibilities that, in his view, the Zenta Valley offered,- where there had been a mission established by the Franciscans - he decided to found a city particularly designed for defensive purposes. In late August 1795 he founded the city of San Ramón de la Nueva Orán (in a curious double tribute to himself, put his name and his hometown in the new city's name).

He brought 150 families, totaling 800 people, to found the city, along with nearly 45,000 head of livestock. It was officially the last city founded in the current Argentina before Independence, and the only - of those that still existed in 1810 - that became the provincial capital. In 1794, he moved the Cathedral of Salta to the temple that had been of the Jesuits. He was assigned the rank of Mariscal.

== Municipality of Charcas ==
In October 1796 he was appointed governor of the Upper Peruvian province of Charcas, a post that included the presidency of the Real Audiencia of Charcas. He took office in October the following year.

He began his government without much luster, especially since he had no experience. He had several clashes with the city council, with the audience, with the University and with Archbishop Moxó. Amid the perpetual conflict between authorities that were standard in the colonies and given his advanced age, he left administrative matters in the hands of his colleagues, but his government was generally regarded as positive.

In 1806, upon the British invasions of the River Plate, he organized military forces to join the Viceroy of the Río de la Plata Rafael de Sobremonte in repelling the British.

In May 1809, he was faced with the Chuquisaca Revolution, in which the elderly García Pizarro, was imprisoned from 25 May to 18 November. He was released by the insurgent government a few days before general Vicente Nieto, who had been sent to crush the rebellion, entered the city. Deeply depressed, García Pizarro retired. He lived long enough to witness the Third Argentine army entered Chuquisaca in October 1815. Pizarro was forced to pay a tribute of 6,000 pesos and saw the Buenos Aires forces loot his property before retreating.
