= Ignacio Flores (Pacificator of Peru) =

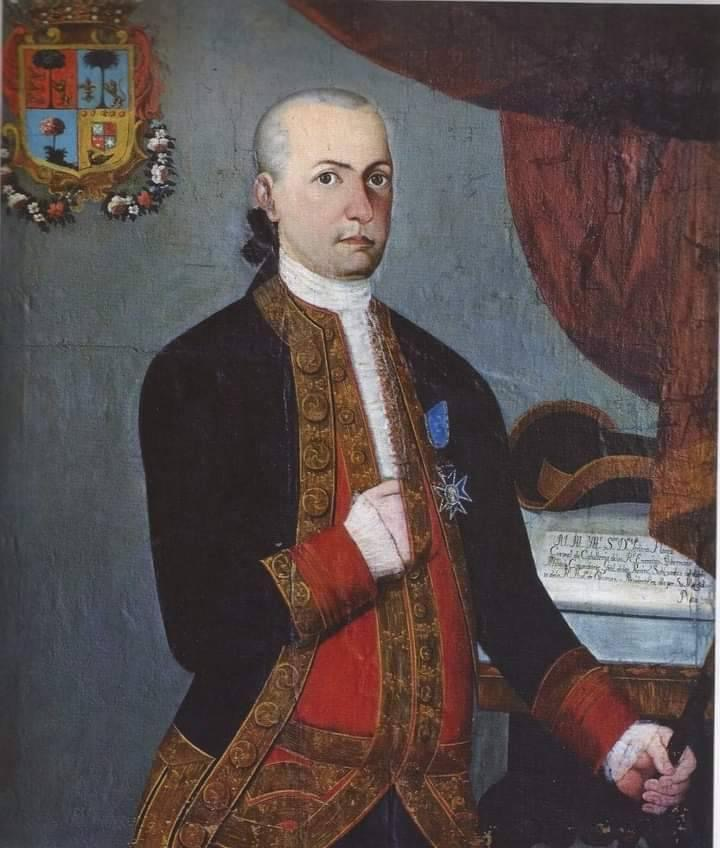
José Ignacio Flores de Vergara y Ximénez de Cárdenas

José Ignacio Flores de Vergara y Ximénez de Cárdenas, the "Pacificator of Peru," (b. Latacunga, Ecuador, 1733; d. Buenos Aires, Argentina, 1786), second-born son of don Antonio Flores, the 1st Marquis of Miraflores, was the first governor of the province of Moxos from 1772 to 1781 and the 20th president of the Royal Court of Charcas from 1781 to 1785.

A refined and cultured man, he embodied the best human qualities of optimism, generosity and idealism of the Spanish American enlightenment in the late 18th century. He taught the humanities and mathematics at the Royal Seminary of Nobles of Madrid. Upon his return to America, as a colonel in the Royal Army, he set about the arduous tasks of keeping the Portuguese from gaining control of the banks of the Madera, Mamoré and Itenez waterways in the upper Amazon Basin and of pacifying the rebellious Aymara Indians led by Tupac Katari, who in 1781, in present-day Bolivia, had laid siege to the city of La Paz for several months as part of a failed Andean rebellion against Spanish domination. This Criollo from Quito who was a fluent Aymara-speaker (he also spoke Quechua) was able to break the siege imposed on La Paz and to save the lives of its residents, only to face "one of the most profoundly unjust deaths recorded in the annals of Spanish American history." He was summarily removed from office, replaced with a heavy dose of nepotism by the Minister of the Indies José de Gálvez's nephew, and charged with "false pacification" for having displayed a minimum of decency and sympathy with the rebel leaders. He died in a loathsome dungeon, in mysterious circumstances, while placed under arrest by the viceroy of Buenos Aires; he supposedly left an unsigned and apocryphal last will and testament, clearly falsified as part of an official cover-up about his death. During the many decades of struggle for independence from Spain in the 19th century, Flores became a symbol for a series of injustices perpetrated by European-born Spaniards against the Criollo upper class in the Spanish Americas.
