= Real Audiencia of Charcas =

Spanish American appellate court (1559–1776)

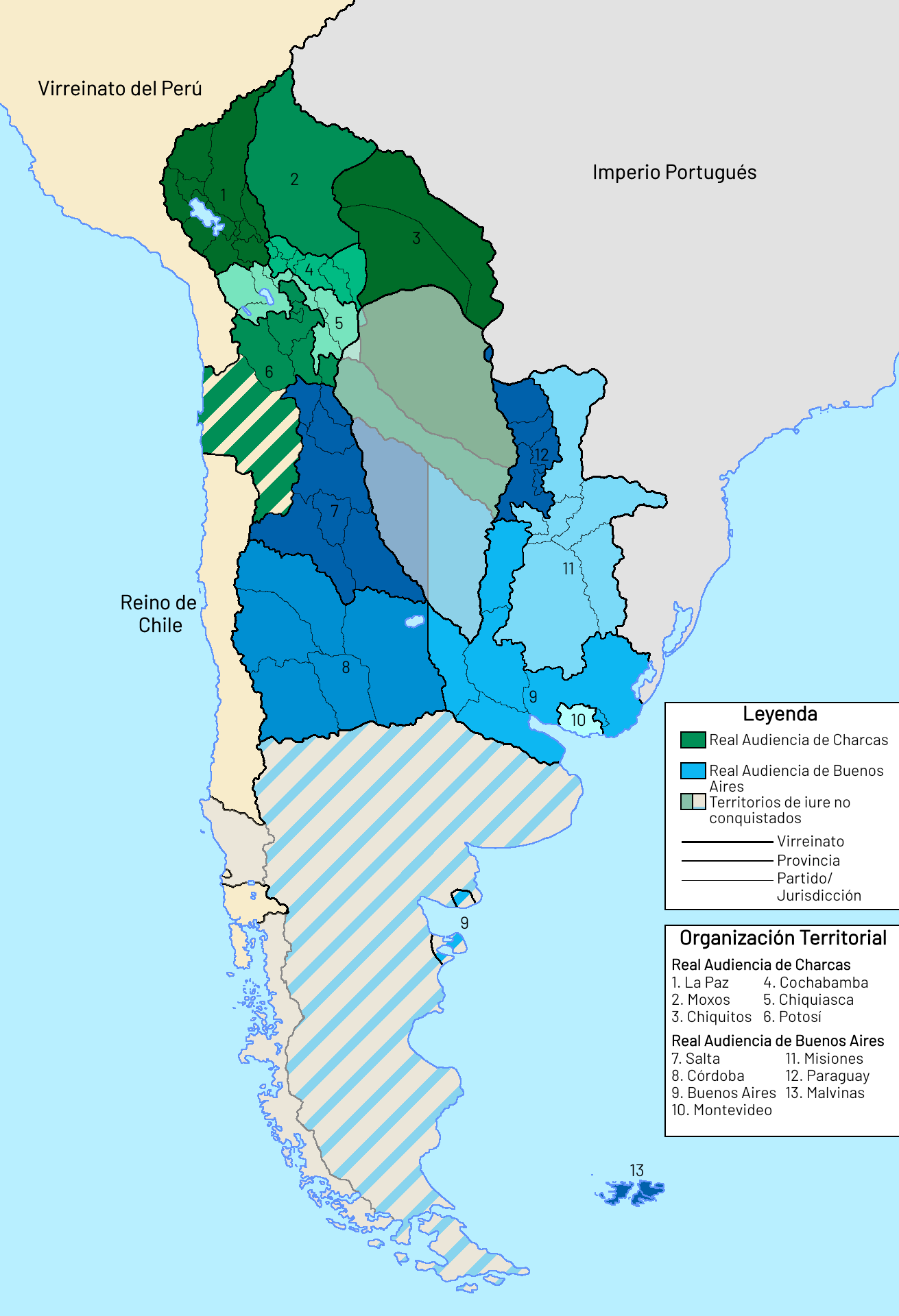
In shades of green, the Royal Court of Charcas in 1783.

The Real Audiencia of Charcas (Spanish: Audiencia y Cancillería Real de La Plata de los Charcas) was a Spanish audiencia with its seat in what is today Bolivia. It was established in 1559 in Ciudad de la Plata de Nuevo Toledo (later Charcas, modern-day Sucre) and had jurisdiction over the Governorate of Charcas (es), Paraguay and the Governorate of the Río de la Plata (now Uruguay and northern Argentina). The audiencia oversaw the incredible silver output of the mines at Potosí. It was part of the Viceroyalty of Peru until 1776, when it was transferred to the newly created Viceroyalty of the Río de la Plata and began to be referred to as Upper Peru.

== Structure ==
Philip II of Spain originally established the audiencia by royal decree on 4 September 1559. Law IX (Audiencia y Chancillería Real de la Plata, Provincia de los Charcas) of Title XV of Book II of the Recopilación de Leyes de Indias of 1680 — which compiles the original 1559 decree and the ones of 29 August 1563, 1 October 1566, 26 May 1573 — describes the borders and functions of the Audiencia.

In Ciudad de la Plata de Nuevo Toledo, Province of the Charcas in Peru, shall reside another Royal Audiencia and Chancellery of ours, with a president; five judges of civil cases [oidores], who shall also be judges of criminal cases [alcaldes del crimen]; a crown attorney [fiscal]; a bailiff [alguacil mayor]; a lieutenant of the Gran Chancellor; and the other necessary ministers and officials; and which shall have for district the Province of the Charcas, all of El Collao, from the town of Ayabiri, along the road of Urqusuyu, from the town of Asillo by the road of Umasuyu, from Atuncana, by the road of Arequipa, towards the part of the Charcas, inclusive with the Provinces of Sangabana, Carabaya, Juríes y Diaguitas, Moyos [see also Moxos people] and Ch'unchu, and Santa Cruz de la Sierra, sharing borders: in the north with the Royal Audiencia of Lima and provinces not yet discovered; in the south with the Royal Audiencia of Chile; and in the east and west with the two Seas of the North and South and the line of demarcation between the Crowns of the Kingdoms of Castile and Portugal, along the Province of Santa Cruz of Brazil. All said territories are and shall be understood to comply with Law 13, which deals with the founding and erection of the Royal Audiencia of Trinidad, Port of Buenos Ayres, because our will is that said law be kept, complied with and executed precisely and punctually.

== Independence ==
Charcas was one of the first regions in Spanish America to establish juntas in the independence period, which deposed the Audiencia judges. These juntas, set up in 1809, were quashed by forces from Peru and Río de la Plata the following year, but the Audiencia was not reestablished until 1816, and then under the auspices of the viceroy of Peru. Areas of Charcas under patriot control sent deputies to the Congress of Tucumán of 9 July 1816 which declared the independence of the provinces of the Río de la Plata. The Republic of Bolivia was created from the Royal Audiencia of Charcas on August 6, 1825.

== List of presidents of the Real Audiencia of Charcas ==
- Pedro Ramírez de Quiñones (1559–1572)
- Lope Díez Aux de Armendáriz (1573–1577)
- Antonio González (1578–1580)
- Juan de Matienzo (1580)
- Juan López de Cepeda (1580–1602)
- Alonso Maldonado de Torres (1602–1610)
- Diego de Portugal (1610–1627)
- Martín de Egües (1627–1632)
- Juan de Carabajal y Sande (Mai 1632–1635)
- Juan de Lizárazu y Recain (März 1635–1642)
- Dionisio Pérez Manrique de Lara, marqués de Santiago (1642–1647)
- Francisco de Nestares Marín (1647–1656)
- Pedro Vázquez de Velasco (1661–1670)
- Bartolomé de Salazar (1670–1673)
- Bartolomé González de Póveda (1673–1685)
- Diego de Mejia (1685)
- Francisco Domínguez (1695–1698)
- José Boneu (1702)
- José Antonio de la Rocha y Carranza, marqués de Villarocha (1704)
- Francisco Pimentel y Sotomayor (1706)
- Jorge Manrique de Lara ( - 1723)
- Gabriel Antonio Matienzo (1723–1725)
- Francisco de Herboso y Luza (1725–1732)
- José Francisco de Herrera (1728)
- Ignacio Antonio de Querazyju y Mollinedo (1730)
- José Gabriel de Jauregui y Aguirre (1738)
- Nicolás Jiménez de Lobatón y Azaña, marqués de Rochafuerte (1746–1757)
- Juan Francisco Pestaña y Chumacero (1757–1766)
- Juan Martínez de Tineo (1767–1769)
- Ambrosio de Benavides (1769–1776)
- Jerónimo Manuel de Ruedas (1776)
- Agustín de Pinedo Fernández de Valdivieso (1779–1780)
- José Ignacio Flores de Vergara y Ximénez de Cárdenas (1781–1785)
- Vicente de Gálvez y Valenzuela (1786–1790)
- Joaquín del Pino y Rosas Romero Negrete (1790–1797)
- Ramón García de León y Pizarro, marqués de Casa Pizarro (1797 – 12. Juli 1809)
- Vicente Nieto de las Viñas y García Sánchez de Valencia y González (30. September 1809–1810)
- Under control of the Junta de Buenos Aires (1810-1810)
- José Manuel de Goyeneche, 1st Count of Guaqui (1810-1811)
- Juan Ramírez Orozco (1811-1813)
- Under control of the Junta de Buenos Aires (1813-1815)
- Miguel Tacón y Rosique (1815)
- José Pascual de Vivero y Salaverria (1816–1818)
- Rafael Maroto e Ysern (1818–1824)
- Pedro Antonio de Olañeta (1824–1825)
- Antonio Vigil (1825)
