= Eustoquio Díaz Vélez =

Argentine general

General Don Eustoquio Antonio Díaz Vélez
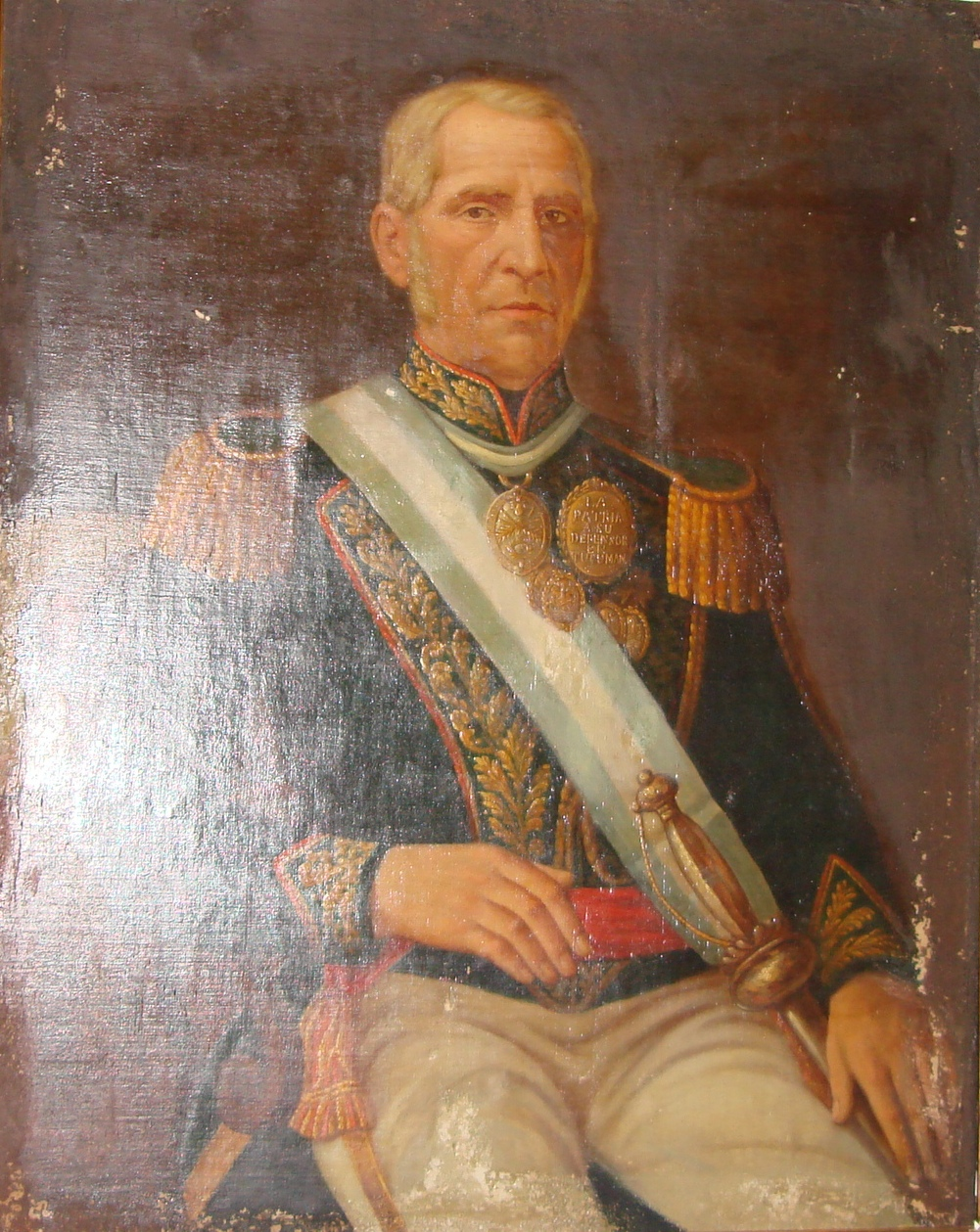

1st and 2nd helper expedition to Upper Peru Suipacha, Huaqui, Jesús de Machaca, Cangrejos, Quebrada del Nazareno, Jujuy Exodus, Cobos, Las Piedras, Tucumán, Yaraicoragua, Cochabamba, El Volcán, Yatasto, Salta, Macha, Vilcapugio, Ayohuma

Major-General of the Army of the North

Military Governor of the Intendencia de Salta
- In office 13 March 1813 – 13 September 1813
- Preceded by: Esteban Agustín Gascón Civil governator
- Succeeded by: Feliciano Chiclana Civil governator

6th and last Lieutenant Governor of Santa Fe
- In office 31 March 1814 – 23 March 1815
- Preceded by: Ignacio Álvarez Thomas

7th Interim Intendentant Governor of Buenos Aires
- In office 13 November 1818 – 16 March 1819
- Preceded by: Juan Ramón Balcarce
- Succeeded by: Juan Ramón Balcarce

Meritorious General of the Republic

Personal details
- Born: 2 November 1782 Buenos Aires, Viceroyalty of the Río de la Plata (now Argentina)
- Died: 1 April 1856 (aged 73) Buenos Aires, State of Buenos Aires
- Party: Patriot
- Spouse: Carmen Guerrero y Obarrio
- Children: Carmen, Manuela and Eustoquio
- Profession: Military

Military service
- Allegiance: Spain (until 1810); United Provinces of the Río de la Plata (modern Argentina)
- Years of service: 1806–1821
- Rank: General of Argentina
- Battles/wars: Spanish American wars of independence

Eustoquio Antonio Díaz Vélez (Buenos Aires, November 2, 1782 – id., April 1, 1856) was an Argentine military officer who fought against the British invasions of the Río de la Plata, participated in the May Revolution, in the war of independence and in the Argentine civil wars.

His name was Eustoquio (Eustochio Antonio according to his baptismal certificate) but usually is cited, incorrectly, as Eustaquio.

== Birth and family ==
His parents were Francisco José Díaz Vélez, a wealthy merchant born in Huelva, Spain who was former chapter of Buenos Aires Cabildo, and María Petrona Sánchez Araoz de Lamadrid, a native of Tucumán, Argentina from an important colonial family.

He was the seventh child of a total of twelve. Among his brothers deserve to be named the second child of the marriage, Dr. José Miguel Díaz Vélez, politician who participated in the war of independence and in the Argentine civil wars; and the eighth offspring of that union, Manuel Díaz Vélez, young lieutenant of the Regiment of Mounted Grenadiers who died as a result of injuries suffered in the baptism of fire against the royalists in the Battle of San Lorenzo.

== The British invasions ==
Diaz Velez joined the Regiment of border's Blandengues of Buenos Aires, a local militia, at a young age. He combined his military duties with trade, gathering some wealth.

During the British invasions of the Río de la Plata he assisted Santiago de Liniers and was discharged in the Regiment of Patricians, on October 8, 1806, as assistant graduate second lieutenant, taking part in the Reconquista of Buenos Aires. The following year, during the second British Invasion, distinguished himself in the Defense of Buenos Aires with the Patricians under the command of Cornelio Saavedra, and submitted the English in the "House of the Widow Virreyna (Viceroy)", between 2 and 7 July. He was promoted to captain.

During the Mutiny of Álzaga of January 1, 1809, he fought on the side of Liniers loyalists and was wounded. That earned him a promotion to lieutenant colonel graduated.

== The May Revolution ==
Díaz Vélez had good relations with the conspirators who, before 1810, sought to achieve the independence of his country. He actively supported the May Revolution, participating in the meetings that decided the dismissal of Viceroy Baltasar Hidalgo de Cisneros, attending the one of May 19, called by Nicolás Rodríguez Peña. On the occasion of the Open cabildo of May 22, Colonel Cornelio Saavedra appointed him as head of the Patricians guards that enabled the assembly meeting that expressed the will of the people.

But as these guards were composed of the body of the patricians who was most touched by the insurrectionary spirit, and as they were under the command of Captain Don Eustaquio Díaz Vélez, who was one of the boldest officers and most developed in the riot, the result was that so far from the entrance clogged it lavishly provided to all who submitted their note with the sign or signal agreed between the patriots, while at the other side was allowed to enter only the personages well known for his official position, opposing difficulties and insurmountable observations to all those who could be taken as strangers or persons of lower position, especially if they were Europeans.

He integrated the resistance focus to the brand-new Government Board of May 24 for being consists with the ex viceroy. That night, he met at Rodriguez Peña home, with Domingo French, Feliciano Antonio Chiclana and other conspirators who managed the resignation of its members and demanded that the cabildo "proceeds with other election in persons that may merit the confidence of the people, course that do not deserve the ones that constitute the present Board, believing that will be the means of calming the agitation and excitement that was renovated between people.... "

Emerged the Primera Junta of Government, it entrusted his first military mission to occupy the square of Colonia del Sacramento, in the Banda Oriental, whose population sympathized with the revolutionary patriots, beating its garrison and carrying large amount of ammunition to Buenos Aires. By this victory the Primera Junta appointed him lieutenant colonel, to be effective.

== Upper Peru Campaign ==
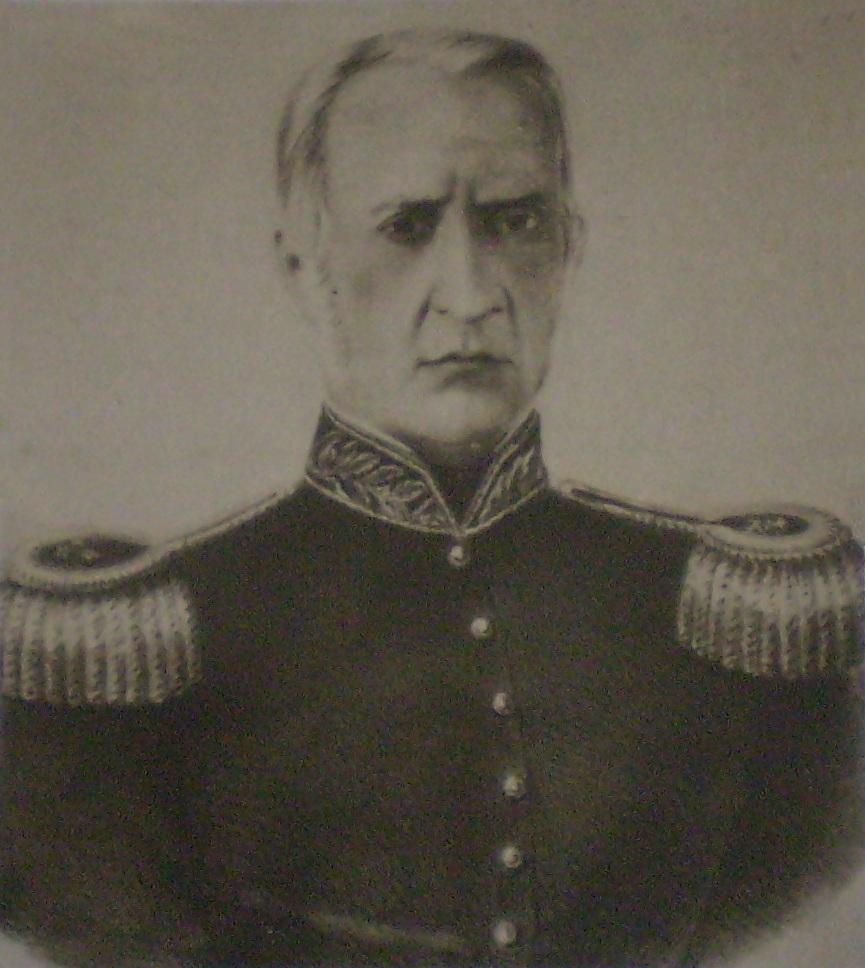
Eustoquio Díaz Vélez.

He was part of the Army of the North (Spanish: Ejército del Norte) that the Board of Buenos Aires had sent to military aid the Intendencias of the Upper Peru and participated in the defeated of Cotagaita. Weeks later, on November 7, 1810, he fought in the Battle of Suipacha, first win rioplatenses revolutionary arms, which allowed the rise of the cities of Potosí, Chuquisaca and La Paz, opening the patriots all the Upper Peru. By order of the Board representative, Juan José Castelli, Díaz Vélez complied with the execution in the main square of Potosí of the royalist authorities Vicente Nieto the governor of Chuquisaca, Francisco de Paula Sanz the governor of Potosí, and José de Córdoba and Rojas Major General defeated in Suipacha on December 15, 1810. He was promoted to colonel. He was part of the Army of the North and was part of the troops that were beaten off by the royalists at Cotagaita. He was later promoted to the rank of colonel.

Castelli signed an armistice with the Spanish commander José Manuel de Goyeneche, but subsequent events showed that neither of them intended to abide by it. Díaz Vélez and Juan José Viamonte, commanding their regiments, were sent as advance parties toward the border. When the bulk of the royalist army launched a massive attack in the Battle of Huaqui, on 19 June 1811, both regiments were almost destroyed without being able to receive help or to assist the rest of the army. Despite the defeat the government recognized him with the title of "bravo" ("brave", in English) because of the value shown on the battlefield.

Mr. Díaz Vélez exit without troop running any horse in the front and goes to the rear to the left of the line of battle ...

The battle was a disaster for the United Provinces' army and, lacking any support, groups of soldiers crossed the Altiplano as they could, fleeing to Humahuaca.

Díaz Vélez, in a letter sent to the revolutionary authorities in Buenos Aires regarding the causes and responsibilities Huaqui's defeat, dated August 29, 1811, held that anything they did not get the Jujuy forces forward ever would Perú. He complained of the ignorance and unpatriotic Upper Peruvian peoples and stated that those provinces were possessed of selfishness and servile spirit they had inherited from their elders. Díaz Vélez warned in mid -1811- the difficulty that the "bottom" provinces would have to spread the revolutionary ideas making their way through the Upper Peru.

Antonio González Balcarce was replaced by Colonel Juan Martín de Pueyrredón, governor of Chuquisaca, as commander of the Auxiliary Army. The regular troops of this, in October 1811, had been reduced to the division of Diaz Velez, who devoid of weapons, ammunition and supplies reached Tupiza. Díaz Vélez was assisted by the cavalry of Martin Miguel de Guemes. Pueyrredón, after taking the treasure of Potosi Mint, fearing a loss and wanting to play a political role in the First Triumvirate formed in Buenos Aires, called for his release, although previously he sent the reinforcements he was able to, to Díaz Vélez when he knew of the movements of Colonel Picoaga royalist forces. Díaz Vélez routed royalist Colonel Barreda at the action of Cangrejillos and, on January 12, 1812 he fought, in the gorge located along the river Suipacha, the Battle of Nazareno, against Picoaga. Although the outcome was adverse to the United Provinces' army was key to relieve Spanish pressure against Cochabamba. A few days later, on January 18, 1812 and by Díaz Vélez orders, Güemes recovered Tarija who had been occupied by supporters of the viceroy of Perú, José Fernando de Abascal, who immediately ordered him to rejoin the army taking 300 men from Tarija, 500 rifles and two cannons. Díaz Vélez had to retire to Jujuy at the approach of the main body of Goyeneche troops, that outnumbered the patriots.

The Second helper expedition to Upper Peru began when General Manuel Belgrano took over the Army of the North. Díaz Vélez participated in the organization of the Jujuy Exodus and created a body of cavalry called the "Patriots Determined" composed of volunteers and gauchos from Jujuy, the Puna and Tarija. He was supported by these irregular grenadiers who provided their own weapons and horses to the troop. Commanding the cavalry, he was responsible for the rear of the exodus.

He also had the cooperation of the Upper Peruvian Juana Azurduy de Padilla who passed directly from Jujuy to Tucumán.

When the patriots were engaged by a detachment of 600 royalist troops sent by Brigadier Juan Pío Tristán and began to withdraw, Díaz Vélez responded quickly and face them at the Battle of Las Piedras, on September 3, 1812, stopping the advance of the royal troops and achieving a victory that managed to reverse the demoralization of the troops and enable further exodus south.

His contribution was of vital importance in the preparations of the shock to be fought on September 24, 1812. He was at the meeting where Belgrano was persuaded by Bernabé, Pedro Miguel and Cayetano Aráoz -the most powerful family in the city of San Miguel de Tucumán who were his maternal relatives- to face the royalists.

Partly for these conversations and Díaz Vélez victory in Las Piedras, Belgrano dared to give the Battle of Tucumán, on September 24, 1812, which was the most important victory of the Argentina War of Independence and sealed the fate of the revolution. Díaz Vélez acted as major-general or second in command of the army.

Although Belgrano had been dragged by the disbanding of a section of his troop offstage action, the field was left to the infantry patriot. Díaz Vélez, noting that it was alone and without cavalry troops, cautious and steady as usual, managed to take the park of Brigadier Pío Tristán, with thirty-nine wagons loaded with arms, ammunition, some of the guns and hundreds of prisoners. Then he took the measure of replicating successful the infantry neatly into the town of San Miguel de Tucumán, placing it in the pits and trenches that had opened there. With the help of troops from the reserve and also taking the wounded, became strong in the city. He also reorganized the artillery and bet shooters on ceilings and corners, making San Miguel in an impregnable square. Encased in it, protected by moats, Díaz Vélez waited expectantly as the winner because in large part, by his actions, he decided the victory of the revolution weapons that day.

Pío Tristán, fearing what his troops could expect into the city, chose to threaten a pair of entrances, but ordered the withdrawal before the first enemy shots. His last attempt was using diplomatic channels: under the intimation of surrender within two hours made by the realistic chief threatened to burn down the city, Díaz Vélez vehemently replied, inviting him to dare, as the patriotic troops were victorious and inside were 354 prisoners, 120 women, 18 ox carts, all rifle ammunition and cannon, 8 guns, 32 officers and 3 chaplains taken to the royal army. He added that, if necessary, slit the prisoners throat, among whom were four colonels. Tristán dared not fulfill his threat and recognizing his defeated situation he retired up to Salta.

... [T]he enemy sought a new outrage the following day. ... defeated as it was, without artillery, ammunition and baggage, had the audacity to intimate the surrender of the town, where the infantry with part of the cavalry had retired. ... Major General, D. Eustoquio Díaz Vélez, who commanded it, was one of those men whose existence had always been attached to the homeland ... with its strong response, undid his faint hope and made him a confused and shameful retreat.

During the retreat, Belgrano ordered him to chop the rear of the defeated army in their escape to the north, taking many prisoners and also making rescue of some who had made the royalist troops.

Díaz Vélez assisted, as an officer and unarmed, to the religious and patriotic act of designation of the Virgin of Mercy as "Generala Army" that made General Belgrano because of the battle occurred on September 24, the day that marks the popular devotion to Our Lady of Mercy.

Since then Díaz Vélez, like many other patriots, began to wear at his chest the scapular of his Generala.

A few days later he was sent to take Salta, before the enemy army got there. Freed from prison Colonel Juan Antonio Álvarez de Arenales, beside which managed to occupy the city. They had to evacuate it on early October, when it was occupied by the army of Tristán.

Because of his prestige, he was charged to reorganize, in November 1812, the Regiment N° 6 of "Black and Browns Patricians", consisting of 782 soldiers of mulatto and African descent.

On 13 February 1813 the Army of the North at the edge of the River Pasage sworn in allegiance to the sovereignty of the Assembly of the Year XIII and Díaz Vélez, as Major General, who, in addition to driving the blue and white flag recognized by the Assembly took oath of allegiance to the same to General Belgrano, who then did the same with Díaz Vélez and the rest of the army. As a result of such transcendent act, since then, this river is called also by the name of Oath.

A few days later, at the Battle of Salta, on February 20, 1813, Díaz Vélez directed an Argentina cavalry wing and although was badly wounded, the coontation was a new and major victory for the patriot weapons. Belgrano took that occasion to name him military governor of the Intendencia de Salta del Tucumán (Province of Salta del Tucumán) of the United Provinces of the Río de la Plata, a position he held between 13 March and 13 September of that same year.

After the Battle of Salta, in which first flamed the homeland sign in an act of war, the flag was placed on the balcony of the Cabildo by Eustoquio Díaz Vélez and the trophies took away to the realists located in the Chapter House. As the military governor of Salta, Díaz Vélez was the first authority in Salta who hoisted the sky blue and white flag.

The victories of Tucumán and Salta allowed the recovery of the Upper Peru by the revolutionaries. Díaz Vélez, as head of the advanced victorious army, triumphantly entered the city of Potosí, on May 7, 1813. Upon arrival, he tried to convince the Upper Peruvian people that their enemies were the people from Lima, who had been the invaders and had seized up sister provinces of the Río de la Plata, their freedoms and their resources -especially its silver production- and that the Buenos Aires army had come to protect them from the royalists.

Inhabitants of the Upper Peru: The winners of Tucumán and Salta, your brothers, have come to protect you against the tyrants of Lima that have enslaved us.

Under pressure from the royalist armies had to withdraw from Potosí.

Under the leadership of Belgrano, during the Battle of Vilcapugio, on October 1, 1813, he led the patriot cavalry. The fight resulted in a straightforward victory for the Spanish troops.

Díaz Vélez led the majority opinion of the officers to retire to Potosi before risking again the revolutionary armies but General Belgrano insisted to face the realistic. On November 14, 1813, at the Battle of Ayohuma patriot forces commanded by Belgrano were again defeated by the royal army. Díaz Vélez guided again the cavalry.

During the retreat by order of Belgrano, and to cover his back, he tried to blow up the building Potosí Mint but the announcement of a population official avoided it.

Both defeats marked the end of the Second helper expedition to Upper Peru and although the royal army was not defeated the revolution managed to stay at the south.

On December 16, the Second Triumvirate ruled that Colonel José de San Martín seconded the General Belgrano in command of the defeated Army of the North. The dispatch ordered the following:

Inasmuch as attending the distinguished services, adherence to a system of freedom, military talents, proven value and known ability of Colonel of the Regiment of Mounted Grenadiers D. José de San Martín, came to confer employment of Major-General of the Heplper Army of Perú, that served in commission of the same cavalry class Line D. Eustoquio Díaz Vélez, giving him thanks, exemptions and privileges that for this title correspond. Therefore, orders and commands to do, be and recognized by such Major General: to which he did issue this office.

Finally the government decided to replace Belgrano himself in command of the Army of the North -because the general was seriously questioned by his performance- and his replacement by San Martín. In the Posta de Yatasto, on January 30, 1814, occurred the transfer of power.

== The Directory ==
He returned to Buenos Aires where he married Carmen Guerrero y Obarrio, on March 18, 1814. With her he had three children: Carmen, Manuela and Eustoquio.

He was promoted to general. He was immediately sent by the Supreme Director as Lieutenant Governor of Santa Fe, with the clear objective to prevent its secession because in 1813, the commander of Paraná, Eusebio Hereñú, had recognized the caudillo José Gervasio Artigas as "Protector of the Free Peoples" ignoring the dependence of Santa Fe and establishing, in fact, the autonomy of Entre Ríos. The clear purpose of the Directory was to not increase the influence of Artigas at failure obtained by previous lieutenant governors.

Díaz Vélez assumed on March 31, 1814 and occupied the city politically and militarily. He devoted himself to send all he could, by hook or by crook, the Army of the North. His government did not have the sympathy of the people, mainly for not being santafesino but also for not respecting the local town council.

On March 20, 1815 artiguistas forces commanded by Manuel Francisco Artigas, Eusebio Hereñú and Luis Lanche river flotilla landed in Santa Fe and, on March 24, the population demanded to give the control to the local cabildo, three days later, Díaz Vélez had to leave the city.

On April 2 fell the new Supreme Director, Carlos María de Alvear, by the rebellion of Ignacio Álvarez Thomas -at that time in command of an army sent to Santa Fe to fight against Artigas- and the head of the local militia, Francisco Candioti, peacefully took over the government by appointment of the cabildo, ushering in the era of Santa Fe as an autonomous province. On April 26, 1815, the appointment of Candioti was ratified by a popular election. This stage was short, since Candioti was ill and on June 25 he was temporarily supplanted by Pedro Tomás de Larrechea, dying Candioti on August, 27.

Díaz Vélez returned to Buenos Aires but quickly joined the Army of Observation formed by 3,000 men under General Juan José Viamonte, who returned to Santa Fe and influenced the local cabildo, which on September 2, 1815, restored the dependency to the government of Buenos Aires, naming Juan Francisco Tarragona as lieutenant governor.

However, in the town of Añapiré, on March 2, 1816, the caudillos Mariano Vera and Estanislao López revolted and besieged the city, capitulating Viamonte on March, 21. They Demoted the lieutenant governor and proclaimed the sovereignty of the province and its entry into the League of Free Peoples, of Artigas.

In April of that year Díaz Vélez was sent in a third attack to Santa Fe. But, looking to avoid a civil war, and in order that the people of Santa Fe, Entre Ríos, Corrientes and the Banda Oriental send deputies to the Congress of Tucumán he signed -the day 9- with the commander of the naval forces of Santa Fe the Santo Tomé pact, by which the Army of Observation deposed interim director Ignacio Álvarez Thomas, transferred its headquarters to Díaz Vélez, replacing Belgrano and agreed that a final peace should be ratified by both governments and also be accepted by Artigas. Artigas's refusal to sign a final peace agreement led to the non-participation of representatives santafesinos in the Argentine Declaration of Independence in the Congress of Tucumán.

In Buenos Aires the Monitoring Board chaired by Juan José Anchorena and the cabildo, who opposed the interim director, readily accepted the resignation of Álvarez Thomas and appointed Antonio González Balcarce as the new interim director.

A few days after the pact was unknown, Governor Vera attacked the city of Santa Fe and managed to reconquer it, Díaz Vélez was forced to leave because of unsuccessful efforts of the Commissioners (Commission of Real Strange) -lawyers doctors Alejo Castex and Miguel Mariano de Villegas, next to the counter Antonio Pósiga- to the government of the Province of Santa Fe to agree on terms for a ceasefire, "authorized to bargain with the chief of that territory the transaction of the unfortunately existing differences between the two territories". He left the santafesino land on August 31, 1816 taking with his troops and on behalf of the Directory, the bell of the city cabildo of Santa Fe.

Díaz Vélez returned to Buenos Aires, where he was part of the renewed Lautaro Lodge, created at the initiative of José de San Martín, who tried to remedy his discredit, trying vainly to make resurgence after the fall of the Director Alvear. The new lodge, called "Grand Lodge" or "Ministerial Lodge", was directed by the Supreme Director Pueyrredón, his minister Gregorio García de Tagle and General Tomás Guido, friend and confidant of San Martín. It was conformed by a heterogeneous group of prominent personalities but as Vicente López y Planes, the priest Antonio Sáenz, Antonio Feliciano Chiclana, Anchorena, Felipe Arana, Domingo French, Antonio Luis Beruti, Juan José Paso, Pedro Agrelo, Manuel Moreno, Cornelio Saavedra, Manuel Belgrano, Marcos Balcarce, Juan Larrea and Esteban Augustín Gascón. The policy of the Grand Lodge was characterized by supporting the Supreme Director elected by the Congress of Tucumán, Pueyrredón, who offered his full support to Continental Plan of San Martin and the Army of the Andes to end the War of Independence of Chile, again dominated by the royalists, restore the independent government and end the Spanish rule in the Viceroyalty of Perú.

On 1817 Díaz Vélez was appointed Assistant Commandant General of the Military Staff and on November 14, 1818 he was appointed interim Intendant Governor of Buenos Aires, replacing Juan Ramón Balcarce, who was ill. In January 1819 he ordered the abolition of bullfighting in El Retiro, for being the circus in ruinous state and to avoid major evils that could ensue the public. He also revisited on the staff of the Military Staff until the end of 1821.

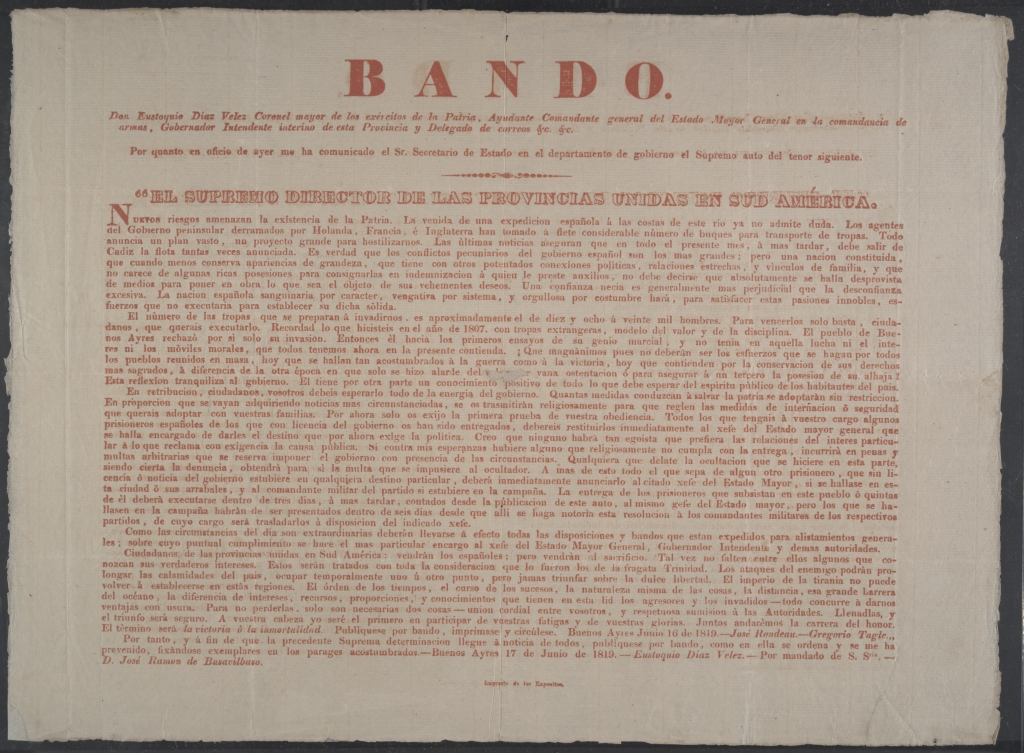
Proclamation of Don Eustoquio Díaz Vélez.

In March 1819 he requested the removal from Governor, keeping only the functions of Police General Intendant. However, he hold both offices until February 1820.

The most important police reforms were: the creation of a single command for operation, the implementation of the "security ticket" or identity record of the persons, the transfer of the administration of the lottery game which was in private hands and the lamentation of the abolition of flogging to which they were subjected children in schools.

Produced the Arequito Revolt and in front of the war against the littoral, the chief of the Military Staff, Saavedra, on 28 January 1820 urged the sovereign Congress to adopt strong measures to remedy the precarious state of the army. Díaz Vélez also asked Congress to urgently meet in secret session. The meeting was held on January 31 and it was decided that the ex Supreme Director Pueyrredón along with another group of people were exiled from the country against the concrete danger that ran their individual security. Congress also appointed Supreme Director substitute alcade of first vote Juan Pedro Aguirre, by 15 votes.

On February 1 was fought the Battle of Cepeda and the victory of the federal army against the directorial finally sully the power of the latter. On February 11, the Cabildo of Buenos Aires forced the Supreme Director José Rondeau resigned and also shall cease power in the hands of the Cabildo. Local authorities also demanded the dissolution of the Congress. National authorities had ceased.

XX Year Anarchy exiled Díaz Vélez in Montevideo.

== Presidency of Bernardino Rivadavia ==
The Chamber of Representatives of the Province of Buenos Aires sanctioned immediately after the assumption of Governor General Martín Rodríguez and his minister Bernardino Rivadavia, the Law of Oblivion, dated on September 27, 1821, which allowed the return of political exiles and cemented peace in the province. Thanks to it Díaz Vélez returned to Buenos Aires and in October of that year, was tabled to active duty being comprised in the provisions of the Military Reform Law, so he retired on February 26, 1822 with full pay.

In that way he left the military career to deal with rural activities, tasks performed with great success. Previously he had received a rural establishment in the "Rincon del Toro", on the margins of the Salado River.

Subsequently, he took advantage of the rivadaviana Emphyteusis Law and he populated a lot of lands. He founded several estancias that served as economic centers of commerce and communication. The best known were the famous "El Carmen" (located in Tandil -in the current Rauch and Ayacucho Partidos-), "Díaz Velez Fields" and "White Dunes" (located south of the Quequén Grande River the Argentine Sea -in the current Necochea Partido). It became the largest single owner of fields in the province of Buenos Aires.

Constituted the General Congress of 1824 and designated Rivadavia President of the United Provinces of the River Plate, was delivered on March 4, 1826, the Capitalization Law declaring the city of Buenos Aires as the capital of the State and increased its perimeter at the expense of an important superficice of the territory of the campaign of the province of Buenos Aires. A few days later, on March 7, a second law was sanctioned, dissolving the powers of the province of Buenos Aires, which was made by the provincial government to cease in the exercise of their functions. In practice, their resources were nationalized, so that the proceeds of the customs and port, among others, became national. On September 12 of that year another bill divided the rest of the province into two new provinces: at the north, the Paraná, with its capital in San Nicolás de los Arroyos and at the south, the Salado, with its capital in Chascomús.

Juan Manuel de Rosas in the province organized a general protest against this policy and revolted in Chascomús, put in prison, he was released quickly due to popular pressure.

The project was resisted by Díaz Vélez who with Rosas, Juan Nepomuceno Terrero, Nicolás Anchorena and other major landowners, collected about seven hundred signatures against it.

== The estanciero ==
Díaz Vélez was involved in civil wars or outside the years that followed. Instead he went to work his estancias or ranches located on the border bonaerense becoming a powerful landowner with great prestige in the people.

The governor of the province of Buenos Aires Manuel Dorrego, through a decree dated on January 2, 1828 named Díaz Vélez, for that year, Chascomús Justice of the Peace. Dorrego also created the Commission of Landowners, formed with the leading provincial landowners, which intended to restore order and tranquility in the campaign and the drafting of a police regulation. To do this, on 28 September of that year, Díaz Vélez was elected commissioner of the campaign along with Manuel Luzuriaga and Francisco Piñeyro.

During the provisional government of General Viamonte, through Decree 1183 of September 26, 1829, the Minister Secretary of Government Tomás Guido designed once Díaz Vélez member of the commission of fifteen landowners to file a police regulation of the campaign. The commission was composed, besides Manuel Luzuriaga and Francisco Piñeyo, by Lorenzo López, Luis Dorrego, Juan Barrenechea, Braulio Costa, Ramón Villanueva, Nicolás Anchorena, Juan Miller, Ladislao Martínez, Roque del Sar, Benito Lynch, Juan Pedro and Juan Barangot Miguens.

In the years 1831 and 1832 he was a member of the commission for the construction of the new church of Chascomús, whose patron was Our Lady of Mercy. The work was entrusted to engineer Felipe Senillosa, who printed a postcolonial style. The cornerstone was laid on Christmas of 1832 and the construction took fifteen years.

He started the peaceful business with the friendly border Indians that in the interior of the same but because of the large expanses of fields and little existing population in an area exposed to dangers this system did not give the expected results.

In September 1831 Díaz Vélez wrote:

The Indians parade as owners by our fields considered masters of every thing is in it, so that the other day an Indian chief arrived at the Díaz Vélez estancia and having resisted the foreman to give horses to 60 and so may indians who accompanied him, that collected herds from his authority, made them all move and left, without any help protected the attacked property. (...) These damned indians as find anybody alone in the field, they undress him and steal. When they reach the estancias by necessity and but by force must give the fillies and mares to remain and to take to their tents, under the penalty of not doing so are threatened the owners and hated and exposed to arreen them the herds of the field. In one word we are the feudatories of them, either out of fear or because no one support force that could oppose them. They repeat that we are authorized to do all this for the same governor (we know that this is false) (...)

Produced the "Revolution of the Restorers" -which pitted the "federal schismatics" of General Juan Ramón González de Balcarce, Governor of the Province of Buenos Aires, and the "federal apostolic", followers of Rosas- General Díaz Vélez joined Gervasio Rosas (who was a personal friend of Balcarce), who was understood with Braulio Costa and Félix Álzaga to confer and seek a reconciliation with the governor Balcarce and his remarkables, convened for the purpose. Although Balcarce agreed in principle to resign the charge, he finally did not inluenciated by his minister, General Enrique Martínez. Finally, before the advance of the troops of General Agustin de Pinedo, head of the revolutionary movement, Balcarce resigned to the legislature on November 3, 1833.

During the period between 1833 and 1835 Díaz Vélez was the largest seller of cattle in the territory of the province.

== Opposition to Rosas ==
In 1839 he supported the revolution called the "Freemen of the South" against the policies of Governor Juan Manuel de Rosas from his estancia of Tandil.

In the area of Fort Independence the revolution had a lot of support. The general had great recognition and influence over the gauchos and countrymen. They were also part of the uprising Egaña, Miguens, Córdoba, Vazquez, Díaz, Arroyo, Miró, Abiaga, Zárate, Zelarrayán, among others.

Although the Fort Independence surrendered without a fight to the revolutionaries on November 10, 1839 and they took over the town for several days, the defeat of the revolutionaries in the Battle of Chascomús, which occurred a few days earlier, signed the failure of the revolution. Quickly arrived at nearby Colonel Echeverría, loyal to the government, from Tapalqué with many Indian allies. The latter, seeing how unprotected was the place, proceeded to loot and destroy it being saved a walled area where Echeverría took refuge with a group of soldiers. The men who not escaped were wounded with spears and women and children captured. The population that at that time was six hundred people was reduced to two dozen neighbors. Echeverria sought help from the General Ramírez leading a large force advancing on Chascomús, the part was received by the Colonel Aguilera who in a forced march reached the fort, which was abandoned by the Indians who took thousands of cattle from the area.

Linked with the Tandil taking, Díaz Vélez was arrested. His house in current 230 Avenida Belgrano, located in Buenos Aires, was sacked by the Mazorca -armed police organization loyalists seized Rosas- and like all his goods and properties.

Prisoner and isolated with his family for a period of nine months, he was released and allowed to go to Montevideo because of his personal reputation.

As a result of the Uruguayan Civil War or Great War, that faced in Uruguay the Colorado Party of Fructuoso Rivera with the white party, led by Rosas ally, Manuel Oribe, it was produced in 1843 the Big Site of Montevideo. To help the defence of the city, General Díaz Vélez formed on 16 February of that same year the Argentina Legion, composed of more than five hundred Argentine volunteers, whose officers were exiled for political reasons both unitary and federal. They were identified by the pale blue and white cockade worn on their hats. Two other legions were organized in the city: The Italian Legion, led by Giuseppe Garibaldi, comprising six hundred men and the French Legion, directed by Juan Chisóstomo Thiebaut, comprising seven thousand soldiers.

== Return and last years ==
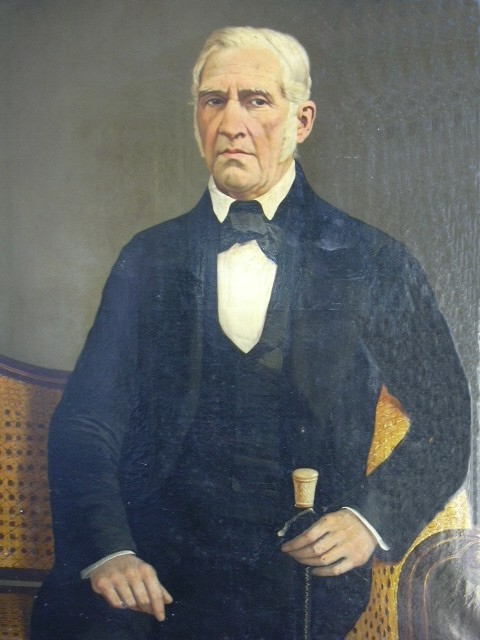
Eustoquio Díaz Vélez. Oil on canvas portrait painted by Benjamín Franklin Rawson. Provincial Museum Complex "Enrique Udaondo". Luján. Provincia de Buenos Aires. República Argentina.

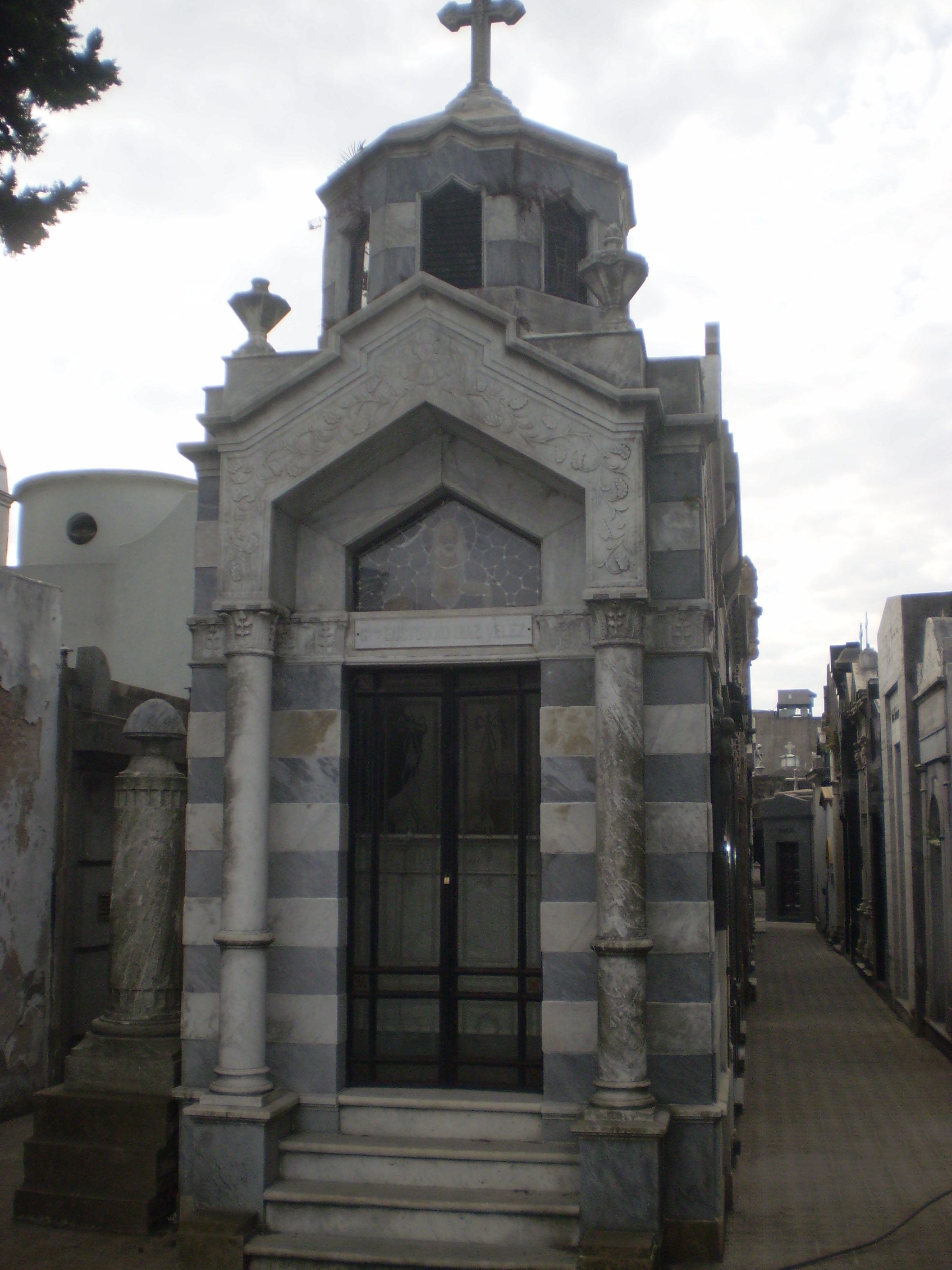
Tomb of the General Díaz Vélez in the Recoleta Cemetery.

Díaz Vélez returned to Buenos Aires after the Battle of Caseros decisive victory of the Great Army that overthrew Rosas regime, on February 3, 1852.

Díaz Vélez, "full of years and of glory" as "meritorious General of the Republic", refused to participate in politics.

Because of his prestige he was appointed President of the Landowners Commission of the province of Buenos Aires and recovered all his lands and much of his estate.

In 1855 native malones attacked Tandil again, therefore the members of the Municipal Corporation Juan Fugl and Narciso Domínguez headed towards the estancia "El Carmen", of Díaz Vélez, located fifty kilometers inside the border line, asking the old General, in his capacity as head of militias, to provide protection to the defenseless people. In the meantime, the few villagers fled to Dolores. By then, it was usual that, due to the large distances to cover and the lack of suitable communication, the national guard arrived late to the scene, when the Mapuche had looted the town and the countryside, taking everything that was useful to them.

Brave as it had been throughout his life, Díaz Vélez, not only did not leave his estancia, but he supplied in it giving refuge and shelter to the gauchos and peasants of the region and prepared, with the few weapons that he possessed, to defend. The aborigines, who know of his bravery, did not attack the fortification.

He did not lived to see materialized the efforts he had initiated in recomposing the weakened border as recently, on March 15, 1857, with the signing of a peace agreement held between the veteran General Manuel Escalada, chief of the South Border army, and the major cacique Catriel, other caciques as Cachul, their families and other chieftains, Tandil region recovered a temporary peace.

Among other points agreed, twenty Indians were employed to work on the "El Carmen" of Díaz Vélez.

== Death ==
Eustoquio Díaz Vélez died in Buenos Aires on April 1, 1856.

His remains rest in the Recoleta Cemetery in the family vault, declared a National Historic Landmark, by decree no. 3039 of 1946 of the National Executive Power.

== Bibliography ==
- Rodríguez Bosch, Raúl, Eustoquio Díaz Vélez. Soldado de la Independencia y la Organización Nacional, Ed. Selene, Bs. As., 1986. ISBN 950-9500-72-0
- Giberti, Hugo A., Buenos Aires. Calles conocidas, soldados olvidados, Ed. Edivérn, Bs. As., 2001. ISBN 987-96007-9-7.
- Cutolo, Vicente, Nuevo diccionario biográfico argentino, Ed. Elche, Bs. As., 1968–1985.
- Canido Borges, Jorge Oscar, Buenos Aires, esa desconocida; sus calles, plazas y monumentos, Ed. Corregidor, Bs. As., 2003. ISBN 950-05-1493-1
- Camogli, Pablo, Batallas por la libertad, Ed. Aguilar, Bs. As., 2005. ISBN 987-04-0105-8
- Ruiz Moreno, Isidoro J., Campañas militares argentinas, Tomo I, Ed. Emecé, Bs. As., 2004. ISBN 950-04-2675-7
- Bidondo, Emilio, La guerra de la independencia en el Alto Perú, Ed. Círculo Militar, Bs. As., 1979.
- Mitre, Bartolomé, Historia de Belgrano y de la Independencia Argentina, Ed. Estrada, Bs. As., 1947.
- Gianello, Leoncio, Historia de Santa Fe, Ed. Plus Ultra, Bs. As., 1986. ISBN 950-21-0150-2
- Zinny, Antonio (1987) [1879-82]. Historia de los gobernadores de las provincias argentinas (in Spanish). Buenos Aires: Hyspamérica. ISBN 950-614-685-3.
- Tarragó, Griselda B. y Barriera, Darío G., Nueva historia de Santa Fe, tomo 4, Ed. Prohistoria, Rosario, 2006. ISBN 987-22462-7-0
- Infesta, María Elena, Del campo a las tabladas. El comercio de vacunos en Buenos Aires, 1830-1840. Estructura y dinámica del sistema, Mundo agrario. Revista de estudios rurales. N° 21, 2do. sem. 2010. ISSN 1515-5994.
- Suárez García, José - Ortíz, Juan Manuel, Historia de la Parroquia de Tandil hasta 1896, Talleres Gráficos La Minerva, Tandil, 1954.
- El Lucero, diario político, literario y mercantil, número 19, Buenos Aires, 29 de septiembre de 1828.
- Ratto, Silvia. Relaciones fronterizas en la Provincia de Buenos Aires. www.etnohistoria.com.ar.
- Registro oficial del Gobierno de Buenos Aires. Libro quinto. Año de 1825–28. Imprenta de la Independencia. Buenos Aires.
- Registro oficial de la Provincia de Buenos Aires. Departamento de Gobierno. Libro octavo. Año 1892–1830.
- La Gaceta mercantil de Buenos Aires 1823–1852. Volumen 2.
- Roca, José Luis, Cochabambinos y porteños. 1810-1813. Separata de Historia y Cultura número 10, La Paz, 1986.
- Saldías, Adolfo, Buenos Aires en el centenario/1810-1834. Crisis de gobierno (1832-1834).
- http://bibliaytradicion.wordpress.com/miscelaneo/francmasoneria/la-masoneria-en-la-argentina-y-en-el-mundo/capitulo-x-epoca-anterior-a-la-instalacion-oficial.
- Gaceta Ministerial del Gobierno de Buenos Aires. Ed. Facsimilar. Vol. I. Buenos Aires. 1910.
- López, Vicente Fidel, La Revolución Argentina, Tomo III: 21–22.
- Martí, Gerardo Marcelo, La amistad entre Belgrano y San Martín Nota I, La Nueva Provincia.com.
- http://www.misionesonline.net/noticias/24/09/2012/la-virgen-de-la-merced-en-la-batalla-de-tucuman.
- Funes, Gregorio. Ensayo de la historia civil de Buenos Aires, Tucumán y Paraguay. Segunda edición. http://www.lagaceta.com.ar/nota/523718/tucumanos/relato-batalla.html.
- Piccirilli, Ricardo; Romay, Francisco L.; Gianello, Leoncio (5 March 1954). "DÍAZ VÉLEZ, Eustoquio Antonio". Diccionario Histórico Argentino (in Spanish). Vol. III. Avellaneda: Ediciones Históricas Argentinas.

== See also ==
Fundación Carlos Díaz Vélez
