= Marcos Balcarce =

Argentine military commander and politician

Marcos González de Balcarce

Governor of Cuyo
- In office July 1812 – September 1812
- Succeeded by: José de San Martín

Personal details
- Born: 1777 Buenos Aires
- Died: 1832 (aged 54–55) Buenos Aires

Military service
- Allegiance: Argentina
- Battles/wars: British invasions of the Río de la Plata; Peninsular War

Marcos González de Balcarce (1777–1832) was an Argentine military commander and politician in the early 19th century.

González de Balcarce was born in Buenos Aires. He was the son of General Francisco González de Balcarce and younger brother of Juan Ramón and Antonio, both distinguished military commanders and politicians also. He joined the armed forces as a cadet in 1788, under the command of his father, and fought in Viceroy Rafael de Sobremonte's campaigns against incursions by Portuguese Brazilian forces into Misiones Province.

During the British invasions of the Río de la Plata, he was captured by the British Navy in the Battle for Montevideo of 1807, and taken to England. After his release, he fought in the service of Spain during the Peninsular War against Napoleon. After his return to Buenos Aires, he participated in the May Revolution in 1810, and was named Governor of Cuyo (western Argentina) by Supreme Director Gervasio Posadas, serving in that capacity from July to September 1812; he was succeeded by General José de San Martín.

González de Balcarce served as War Minister to Supreme Director Ignacio Álvarez Thomas in 1815, and led a campaign against the Liga Federal of eastern separatists, meeting defeat at the hand of Entre Ríos Province leader Francisco Ramírez. He later served as minister in a variety of subsequent governments, many which were staunch enemies of each other, including Governor Juan Gregorio de Las Heras, Presidents Bernardino Rivadavia and Vicente López y Planes, and Governor Juan Manuel de Rosas. He died of ill health in Buenos Aires in 1832.
