= Astete =

Spanish surname

Astete is a Spanish surname, from an ancient Basque - Castilian lineage. The etymology of "Astete" comes from the Basque language: "Aste" possibly a variation of "Arte" means oak, and "ete" is a suffix to nearby location. The most probable original locations, prior to the 16th century, are the regions of ancient Basque influence of the medieval Castile (such as La Bureba and the mountains of Burgos) and modern La Rioja. The earliest official records of Astetes occur in La Rioja, in Santo Domingo de la Calzada, in the province of Valladolid and Quintanaélez in the province of Burgos. They were hidalgos and had casas solariegas (ancient family seat) in Quintanaélez (Burgos), Valladolid and Salamanca.

The first immigrants to the Americas traveled there with expeditions in the 16th century. Today people of these surnames live mainly in Peru (the oldest branch), Chile, Bolivia, Argentina, Brazil, Mexico and United States. In Spain the surname is very rare today. Most Spanish Astete are descended from the branch that settled in Seville, Zahara de la Sierra and Grazalema (between the 17th and 18th centuries), and live in the province of Cádiz in Andalusia. The variant "Estete" is possibly from La Rioja, but occurred sporadically or as a result of spelling mistakes in other Spanish provinces.

== People with historical significance ==
=== Astete surname ===
Pedro Astete - mayor of the town of Barcial de la Loma and holder of the local fortress; in 1521 he was involved in the Revolt of the Comuneros against the Royal authority in Castille. Possibly, the "Hidalgos" Astete de Ulloa from Quintanaélez are his descendants.

Gaspar Astete (b. Coca de Alba, 1537 - d. Burgos, 1601) - Jesuit theologian, his most famous book, Catecismo de la Doctrina Cristiana, had thousands of editions and is the most widely known religious book in Spanish language.

Juan Astete de Monroy (Valladolid, 1599 - Spanish Netherlands?) Spanish military, hidalgo of the wealthy family branch in Valladolid, Knight of Santiago's Order, poet and Lope de Vega's friend. He was an infantry captain of the famous Spanish Tercios at the Thirty Years' War, and fought in the Battle of Rocroi (1643). He was possibly killed in action in Flanders.

Pablo Astete- Military of the viceroyalty of Peru, was colonel of the royalist army. He was a personal friend to Túpac Amaru II; however as a royalist officer, he fought against Túpac during his rebellion (1781). As a battalion commander, fought in the battle of Huaqui (1811), a significant victory for the royalists against the Argentine independentists. He was defeated in Tucumán and Salta a few years later.

Santiago Astete - Basketball player from Peru, served 2 years in the military and known for losing his phone in Swan. At 191cm, he's the 92nd tallest person in Peru.

Domingo Luis Astete - Military and lawyer of the viceroyalty of Peru, was battalion commander, like his brother Pablo, in Huaqui, Tucuman and Salta. In 1814 he participated in the interim governing board of Cuzco, in the insurgence of the Brigadier Mateo Garcia Pumacahua and the Angulo brothers. But, he was soon harassed because of his aristocratic origin and left the movement.

José Santos Astete - Chilean military, fought in the Spanish American wars of independence, as cavalry captain in the Chilean Patriot Army's militia corps, under General Bernardo O'Higgins.

Luis Germán Astete - (b. Lima, 1832 - d. Huamachuco, 1883) Peruvian military and politician, Captain of the Peruvian Navy. In 1877 he took command of the ironclad Huáscar and fought two British warships, in what was called the Pacocha Incident. He participated in the War of the Pacific and, after the defeat of the Peruvian navy, joined the army under General Andrés Avelino Cáceres. In the Battle of Huamachuco, he was the commander of the 4th army division and was killed in action.

Alejandro Velasco Astete - Peruvian military and aviator (b. Cuzco, 1897 - d. Puno, 1925); he was the first to fly over the Andes by plane (1925), taking off from Lima and landing at Cuzco. He died during the return trip in a plane crash in Puno.

=== Estete surname ===
Martin Estete - Spanish military and "conquistador" (b. Santo Domingo de la Calzada? - d. Lima, c.1537), came to the "Indias" with Diego de Nicuesa's expedition in 1510. He is considered the "immigrant ancestor", the first person of his surname to come to Americas. He received his first official appointment in 1521 in Panama; as the "right hand man" of governor Pedro Arias Dávila, he carried out explorations and military missions in Panama and Nicaragua. He was one of the founders of Trujillo, sub-governor, and charged with charting the urban layout of the city.

Miguel Estete - Spanish military and conquistador (b. Santo Domingo de la Calzada, 1495 - d. Ayacucho about 1572), took part in the conquest of the Inca empire, participating in all major actions, including the capture of its last emperor, Atahualpa (1532). He saw the founding of San Miguel de Piura, chose the location for Trujillo and was among the first residents at Huamanga (now known as Ayacucho). During the conflict between the conquistadores (1535–1541), he allied with Diego de Almagro and Hernando de Soto against Pizarro and his brothers. He wrote a noted chronicle of the conquest, in which he described all events that occurred till the capture of Cuzco.

== Noteworthy people ==
Miguel Astete - Local politician ("Alcalde ordinario") from Santo Domingo de la Calzada, in the 15th-century Kingdom of Castille, he is the first person with Astete surname to be found in official records (1466) and the first appointed to a political office.

Bartolomé Astete de Ulloa - Spanish hidalgo from Quintanaélez (b. Miraveche 1578 - d. Lima around 1662), official genearch (immigrant ancestor) of the "Astete family" in the Americas, with the military of the viceroyalty of Peru, was a miner and factor of the Potosí silver mines. He was Corregidor of Charcas and accountant of the royal treasury in Lima.

Manuel de Arce Otalora y Astete - Spanish magistrate (b. Oviedo 1644 - d. Valladolid? c. 1706), nephew of Don Juan Astete Monroy, was Knight of Santiago, criminal judge in Valladolid, corregidor of Guipúzcoa (1678 to 1682) and counselor of the Crown of Castile (1690 to 1705).

Andrés de Astete y Zárate - military of the viceroyalty of Peru (Lima 1669 - deceased in the 18th century), Knight of Santiago Order

Domingo Astete y Mercado - Lawyer of the viceroyalty of Peru (18th century), aristocrat from Lima, he was the patriarch of the Astete clan of Cuzco and father of colonels Pablo and Domingo Luis (discussed in the section above)

Pedro Astete - Peruvian politician (19th century), grandson of the patriarch Don Domingo Astete from Cuzco, he was provincial deputy and diplomat

Luis Astete y Concha - Peruvian painter (b. Lima 1866 - d. Lima 1914), portrayed many eminent people and politicians of the Peruvian society of his time.

Santiago Astete Chocano - Peruvian linguist (b. Cuzco 1886 d. Lima 1975), was the main founder of the Quechua Language Academy in Cuzco, in the 1950s. He created a translation method from Quechua to Spanish that is still widely used. He published articles and books about the Quechua language and its grammar, such as El lenguaje de los qeshuas hablado por el poblador del Ande peruano (1959).
