= Juan Ramón Balcarce =

Argentine military leader and politician

Juan Ramón González de Balcarce
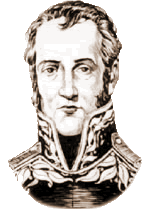

5th Governor Intendant of Buenos Aires Province
- In office 30 July 1818 – 12 November 1818
- Preceded by: José Rondeau
- Succeeded by: Eustaquio Díaz Vélez

7th Governor Intendant of Buenos Aires Province
- In office 17 March 1819 – 9 February 1820
- Preceded by: Eustaquio Díaz Vélez
- Succeeded by: Matías de Irigoyen

3rd Governor of Buenos Aires Province
- In office 6 March 1820 – 11 March 1820
- Preceded by: Manuel de Sarratea
- Succeeded by: Manuel de Sarratea

14th Governor of Buenos Aires Province
- In office 17 December 1832 – 4 November 1833
- Preceded by: Juan Manuel de Rosas
- Succeeded by: Juan José Viamonte

Personal details
- Born: 16 March 1773
- Died: 12 November 1836 (aged 63) Concepción del Uruguay
- Party: Federalist

Military service
- Allegiance: Argentina
- Battles/wars: British invasions of the Río de la Plata

Juan Ramón González de Balcarce (16 March 1773 – 12 November 1836) was an Argentine military leader and politician.

== Biography ==
Juan was the older brother of Antonio González de Balcarce and of Marcos González de Balcarce. He fought against the British in 1807, and in the 1812–1813 military campaign in Upper Peru under General Manuel Belgrano. He was governor of Buenos Aires from 1818 to 1820. Under the government of Juan Manuel de Rosas, he served as the defense minister. In 1832, he was again elected governor of Buenos Aires. On 11 October 1833, the city was filled with announcements of a trial against Rosas. A large number of gauchos and poor people made a demonstration at the gates of the legislature, praising Rosas and demanding the resignation of Balcarce. The troops organized to fight the demonstration mutinied and joined it. The legislature finally gave up the trial, ousted Balcarce and replaced him with Juan José Viamonte. Balcarce was imprisoned and died in exile in Concepción del Uruguay.

== See also ==
- List of heads of state of Argentina

Political offices
Preceded by Juan Manuel de Rosas	Governor of Buenos Aires Province (Head of State of Argentina); 1832–1833	Succeeded by Juan José Viamonte
