= Matilde Díaz Vélez =

Argentine architect

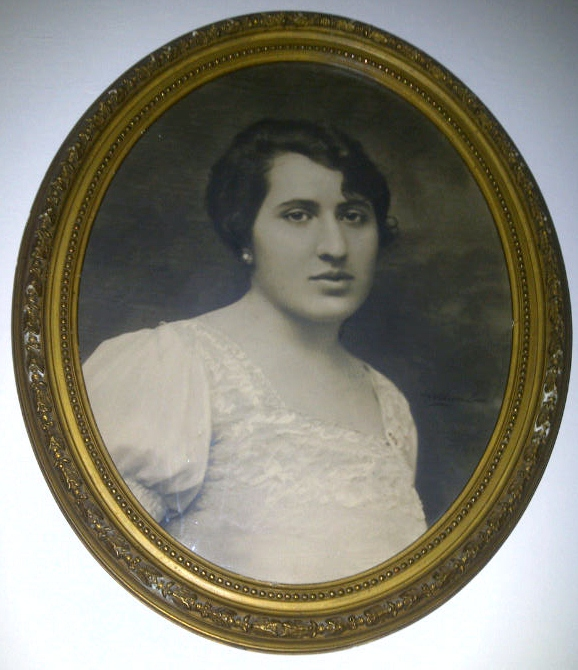
Matilde Díaz-Vélez circa 1910

Matilde Díaz-Vélez (2 July 1899 – 9 June 1986) was a philanthropist and urbanist whose will started the Fundación Carlos Díaz-Vélez, which is concerned with education about cattle farming. The foundation is named for her father. She had significance to Guernica, Buenos Aires.
