= Battle of Cotagaita =

- Part of First Upper Peru campaign
Date	27 October 1810
Location	Santiago de Cotagaita, Bolivia 20°49′3.87″S 65°39′35.24″W
Result	Viceroyalty of Peru victory

Belligerents
Provinces of the Río de la Plata (Note: The Provinces of the Río de la Plata were loyal to the Junta of Buenos Aires.)	Viceroyalty of Peru (Note: The Viceroyalty of Peru was loyal to the Council of Regency of Spain and the Indies.)

Commanders and leaders
(Spain) Antonio González Balcarce	(Spain) José Fernando de Abascal y Sousa

Units involved
(Spain) Army of Peru	Royal Army of Peru
- Location within Bolivia Battle of Cotagaita (South America) Battle of Cotagaita (America)

The Battle of Cotagaita was fought on 27 October 1810 during the Campaign of Upper Peru in the Argentine War of Independence when the troops of the Army of the North were sent by the Primera Junta government in Buenos Aires to Upper Peru to fight the Royalists. It was the first skirmish of the Army of the North in this theatre. The battle was fought near the town of Santiago de Cotagaita, nowadays in the Potosí Department in Bolivia.

General José Manuel de Goyeneche was appointed by the viceroy of Perú to command the royalist forces in Upper Peru, who along with the president of the Real Audiencia of Charcas, Vicente Nieto, decided to establish a forward post in Cotagaita under the command of Frigate Captain José de Córdoba y Rojas. These forces were left isolated after the calls for independence of Cochabamba (14 September) and later of Oruro (24 September) in favor of the Junta in Buenos Aires.

The royalist forces comprised the provincial battalion of Potosí, under commander Indalecio González de Socasa; the Puno battalion; veterans of Borbón; the King's Volunteers; dragoons of Chichas and lancers of Cinti. The revolutionary forces included the first battalion under commander Gregorio Perdiel; sixth battalion under commander Carlos Forest, Hunters battalion under commander Manuel Dorrego; Blandengues battalion under commander Abraham González; and the Husars Regiment under commander Martín Miguel de Güemes.

The attack started in the early hours of the morning and ended at 2 pm the same day. Not having been able to dislodge the royalists from their trenches, Balcarce effected an orderly retreat without being chased.

After the Cotagaita action, the revolutionary forces were obligated to retreat towards Tupiza and then Suipacha, to await reinforcement, where later they achieved their first victory at the Battle of Suipacha.
