= José de Córdoba y Rojas =

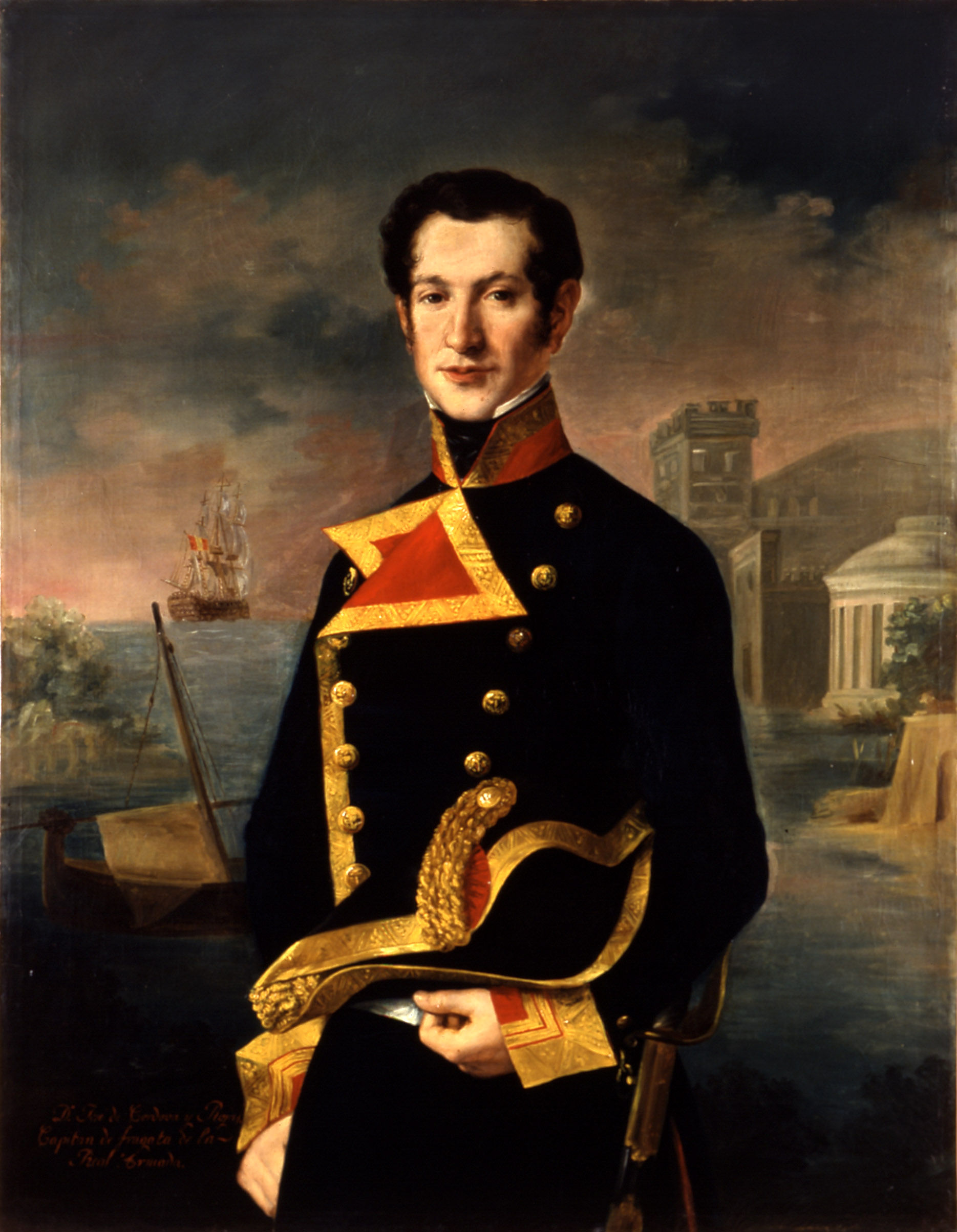
José de Córdova y Rojas (Naval Museum of Madrid)

José María Fernández de Córdoba y Rojas (also José de Córdoba) (6 April 1774 in San Fernando, Cádiz – 15 December 1810 in Potosí), was a Spanish military officer who played an important role in the early stages of the Argentine War of Independence.

He was the son of José de Córdoba y Ramos, a vice admiral and commander of the Spanish fleet, who was defeated at the Battle of Cape St. Vincent (1797) and who was consequently dismissed from service.

José also served in the Spanish Navy and fought against the French (Siege of Toulon) and British. In 1801, he travelled as frigate captain to the Viceroyalty of the Río de la Plata. There, he distinguished himself in repelling the British invasions of the River Plate in 1806 and 1807.

In 1809 he entered the Army as major general under the orders of Vicente Nieto. In 1809 he was sent north to suppress the Chuquisaca Revolution. Córdoba and Nieto remained in the Charcas area, at the request of José Fernando de Abascal y Sousa, Viceroy of Peru.

Here they learned from the May Revolution in Buenos Aires and the approach of the Army of the North. Nieto and Córdoba moved their army south and defeated the rebels in the Battle of Cotagaita. But on 7 November 1810 Nieto and Córdoba were decisively defeated in the Battle of Suipacha and taken prisoner. They were condemned to death and executed in Potosi.

== Marriage and children ==
He married María de la Paz Rodríguez de Valcárcel y O'Conrry and had at least 2 sons:

- Luis, general, diplomat and Marquis of Mendigorría
- Fernando, military, politician, and Prime minister of Spain for one day
