= Battle of Huaqui =

Battle of the Bolivian War of Independence

Battle of Huaqui or Guaqui
- Part of First Upper Peru campaign
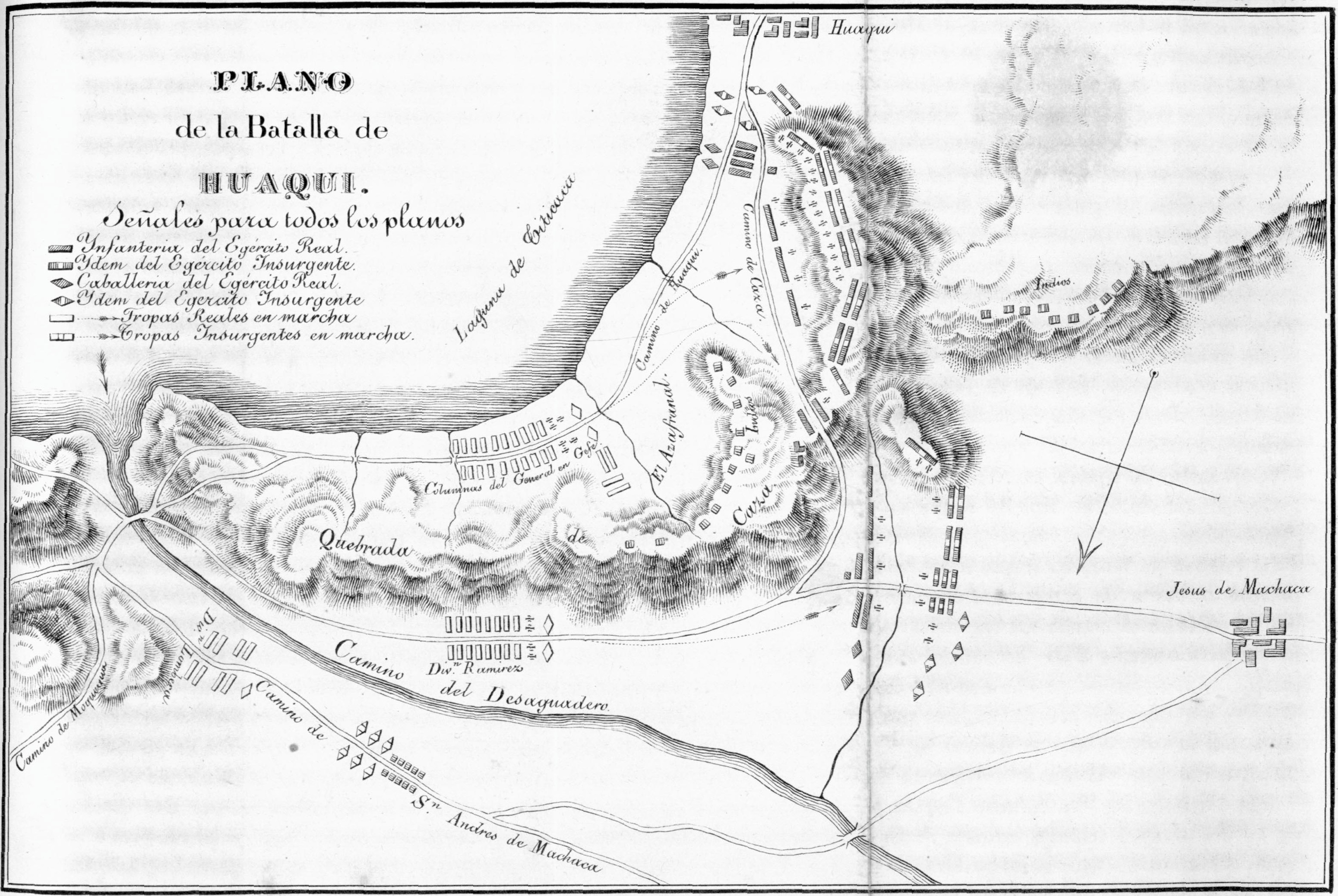
- Old map of the battle, showing Titicaca lake on the north
Date	20 June 1811
Location	Guaqui, near the Desaguadero River 16°38′34.21″S 68°54′05.29″W
Result	Viceroyalty of Peru victory

Belligerents
Provinces of the Río de la Plata (Note: The Provinces of the Río de la Plata were loyal to the Junta of Buenos Aires.)	Kingdom of Spain and the Indies (the Spains); Viceroyalty of Peru (Note: The Viceroyalty of Peru was loyal to the Council of Regency of Spain and the Indies.)

Commanders and leaders
Juan José Castelli; Antonio González Balcarce	José Manuel de Goyeneche

Units involved
Army of Peru	Royal Army of Peru

Strength
5,000 soldiers and 13,000 native auxiliaries	8,000 Indigenous combatants (including 4,700 Indigenous militias from Viceroyalty of Peru)
- Location within Bolivia

The Battle of Huaqui or Battle of Guaqui-modern spelling- (in some sources also called Yuraicoragua or Battle of Desaguadero), was a battle on June 20, 1811, between the Primera Junta's (Buenos Aires) revolutionary troops and the royalist troops of the Viceroyalty of Peru on the border between Upper Peru, (present-day Bolivia), resulting in a comprehensive defeat of the revolutionary armies.

== Prelude ==
The army commanded by Juan José Castelli and Antonio González Balcarce had their first encounter with the royalists under the command of General José Manuel de Goyeneche in October 1810. The royalist army did not press their advantage and did not pursue, and while retreating to the South, they had another encounter which they lost at Suipacha.

The successful advance of the Primera Junta's troops continued to the North of Upper Peru and on June 20, 1811, they met again near the Desaguadero River where battle ensued.

== Battle ==
On the morning of June 19, the revolutionary army had placed their troops in Guaqui, Caza and Machaca and built a temporary bridge over the Desaguadero River moving 1,200 troops across. The aim was to distract Goyeneche's troops on their front and right flank while surrounding the royalists on their rear through the lines established by this new bridge.

General Goyeneche decided to do a direct attack with his full force. At three in the morning of June 20, he ordered colonels Juan Ramírez and Pablo Astete, lieutenant colonels Luis Astete and Mariano Lechuga (with 350 cavalry and four cannons) to attack Caza, near the road to Machaca and communication to Guaqui, while he marched towards Guaqui with colonels Francisco Picoaga and Fermín Piérola commanding 300 cavalry, 40 guardsmen and 6 pieces of artillery.

At dawn the heights on the hills the royalist troops needed to take were already teeming with revolutionary troops, cavalry and fusiliers who started shooting the Spaniards along with grenades and slingshots. The royalists responded, and within a few hours, made the revolutionaries retreat.

When the independentist troops heard of Goyeneche's advance towards Guaqui, Castelli, Balcarce and Montes de Oca left the town with 15 artillery pieces and 2,000 men and took a strong position on the road to Guaqui between a small lake and the hills behind.

Goyeneche ordered an advance under enemy fire while colonel Picoaga's battalion covered them with return fire. The independentist troops, recognizing General Goyeneche, directed their fire towards him, and he ordered one of his aides to transmit the order to attack with his right flank, also covering the road with Piérola's battalion and detached three companies to advance on the front while he and the rest of his troops attacked through the left.

The Argentine cavalry tried to stop the push but was overrun and fled, along with the whole rebel army towards Guaqui. Goyeneche ordered pursuit and subsequently captured the town. Colonel Ramírez soon after sent a messenger informing them of victory at Caza.

The battle ended with the Argentine troops in full retreat, with more than 1,000 men lost and abandoning most of their artillery. In full run they took refuge in Potosí and later on farther south in Jujuy.

== Consequences ==
At the same time, on June 20, 1811, a revolution that was previously prepared, started in Peru. Their leader Francisco Antonio de Zela had agreed with the Argentine troops that while he started the revolution in Tacna, the Argentine army would advance towards Peru to initiate the liberation campaign on that country, but the defeat at Huaqui stopped the plans on Peruvian territory.

The bad impression that this defeat caused in Buenos Aires, where they had lost their guns, resulted in González Balcarce and Castelli being relieved of their commands and court-martialed. The defeat also caused a cease-fire in the siege at Montevideo due to the concern in Buenos Aires of being attacked from two fronts at the same time.

The independentist's defeat at Huaqui was of such magnitude that the weakness created in the north after the battle forced them to name General Belgrano to take control of the Army of the North and try to re-establish discipline, train the troops and wait for new armament. It forced him to take extreme measures and mobilize Northern Argentina's population in Jujuy Province towards the south before the imminent Spanish offensive. This episode is known in history as the Jujuy Exodus (Spanish:Éxodo Jujeño).

== See also ==
- Battle of Sipe-Sipe

== Bibliography ==
- Díaz Venteo, Fernando. Las campañas militares del Virrey Abascal. Sevilla, Escuela de Estudios Hispanoamericanos, 1948. (in Spanish)
