= Cobos, Salta =

Coordinates: 24°43′S 65°06′W

Cobos (Salta)
- Municipality and village
- Interactive map of Cobos (Salta)
- Country: Argentina
- Province: Salta Province
- Time zone: UTC−3 (ART)

Cobos (Salta) is a village and rural municipality in Salta Province in northwestern Argentina.
