= Fundación Carlos Díaz Vélez =

Argentine cattle education foundation

- Founded: 1990
- Founder: Matilde Díaz Vélez
- Type: Nonprofit organization
- Purpose: Develop strategies that take into account the diversity and complexity of current social, promoting the growth of the sector through joint work with schools, NGOs and other entities.
- Location: Buenos Aires, Argentina
- Region served: Argentina
- Services: Agricultural Education, Charitable giving, Programs
- Members: Seven
- Key people: Belisario Álvarez de Toledo, President of the Administration Council
- Website: www.fundaciondiazvelez.org.ar

The Fundación Carlos Díaz Vélez (in English: Carlos Díaz Vélez Foundation), acronym: FCDV, is a foundation which aims to promote the agricultural cattle education in any of its manifestations and was created in Argentina in 1990.

The Fundación Carlos Díaz Vélez caption is Juntos por la educación agropecuaria (in English: Together for the agricultural education).

== Origins ==
The birth of the Fundación Carlos Díaz Vélez was due to compliance with the will and testament of the rancher and philanthropist Matilde Díaz Vélez who wanted her heirs to promote agriculture and cattle education, activities considered fundamental to the growth of Argentina.

In order to have sufficient resources to carry out this useful purpose, the founder bequeathed three fields: "Patina", "Tita" and "Rincón del Quequén" located in the province of Buenos Aires.

In January 1990, in compliance with this legacy, her heirs decided to start a foundation, which is named "Fundación Carlos Díaz Vélez" (in English:"Carlos Díaz Vélez Foundation") in honor of her father, Carlos Díaz Vélez.

The Foundation is a nonprofit civil organization dedicated to promote education of agriculture and livestock farming.

Approved its statute, governing their establishment and operation, the first Administration Council was integrated by:

- President: architect, Enrique Woodrow Álvarez de Toledo (†)
- Vicepresident: doctor, Federico Nicolás Videla Escalda (†)
- Secretary: engineer, Ángel Belisario Di Benedetto
- Treasurer: industrial engineer, Carlos Álvarez de Toledo
- Deputy Treasurer: doña, María Mercedes Álvarez de Toledo de Aguirre (†)
- Vocal: doña, Mathilde Álvarez de Toledo de Piazzini (†)
- Vocal: engineer agronomist, Jorge Manuel Loitegui.

== Programs ==
Today the Fundación Carlos Díaz Vélez fulfills its goal through three complementary programs or actions:

1. Strengthening of agricultural schools,
2. College scholarships and
3. Training.

=== Strengthening of agricultural schools ===
The Strengthening of agricultural schools program was the first activity that the Foundation began to carry out. From its beginnings, members of the Administration Council wanted to favor the Agricultural School Eustoquio Díaz Vélez, of Rauch, province of Buenos Aires. This is due to the special affection and interest in this educational institution, the only one of its kind located in that Partido or District of that province and which it is so priced to the Díaz Vélez Álvarez de Toledo familiar history.

This program, designed primarily for the province of Buenos Aires, over two decades was expanded to a number of educational institutions located in thirteen of the twenty-three provinces of Argentina. The Foundation currently conducts two annual calls to promote educational productive projects for agricultural schools.

Ideas, projects and activities that promote agricultural development and spaces that encourage growth and continuous training of students, teachers and members of the community within which schools are inserted.

=== College scholarships ===
In 2007 the foundation established its first college scholarship program, instituting Carlos Díaz Vélez Scholarship, which targets high school graduates with excellent academic performance and that, for economic reasons, can not access to tertiary or university studies related to the agriculture knowledge.

Annually students have been incorporated in their condition of fellows of the Foundation. Currently twenty college students enjoy the fellowship enrolled in the School of Veterinary Medicine of the Universidad Nacional del Centro de la Provincia de Buenos Aires, UNICEN, (in English: National University of Central Buenos Aires Province), at Tandil and race Agricultural Engineering of the same university, located in Azul.

=== Training ===
The Foundation has a training program that is designed to operate in the training of managers and teachers from agricultural schools.

=== Acknowledgment ===
In 2015 the Fundación Carlos Díaz Vélez, during the XIII Edition of the Agricultural Excellence Price La Nación-Banco Galicia, received the award to the best educator.
