= Vicente Nieto =

Spanish general

Vicente Nieto (1769 Aranjuez – 1810 Potosí) was a Spanish general, a royalist of the Spanish American wars of independence.

== Biography ==
Vicente Nieto had a long military career in Spain, fighting in the French Revolutionary Wars. He was under the command of Antonio Ricardos, during the War of the Pyrenees, which ended with the Peace of Basel.

He moved to the Americas in 1795, to the Upper Peru. He helped Joaquín del Pino to take the rule of the Viceroyalty of the Río de la Plata, and managed the military of Buenos Aires up to the government of Rafael de Sobremonte. He was appointed then governor of Potosí, but did not take office.

He fought in the British invasions of the Río de la Plata under the command of Santiago de Liniers. He returned to Spain in 1808 because of the Peninsular War, and fought at the Battle of Medina de Rioseco. He returned to the Americas with the newly appointed viceroy Baltasar Hidalgo de Cisneros, being appointed military commander of Montevideo.

When, during the May Revolution in May 1810, the independence of Buenos Aires was declared, and a rebel army marched against upper Peru, Nieto joined General José de Córdoba and Francisco de Paula Sanz, governor of Potosí. The campaign was short, but decisive. The rebels were at first defeated at Cotagaita on 27 October and at Tupiza on 29 October, but collected their forces, and at Suipacha on 7 November they gained a complete victory, the royalist governor and the two royalist generals being made prisoners. Soon all the provinces of upper Peru pronounced for independence, and in the next month, by order of Juan José Castelli, member of the junta gubernativa, the three Spanish chiefs were shot in Potosí.
