= Ignacio Álvarez Thomas =

South American military commander and politician

José Ignacio Álvarez Thomas
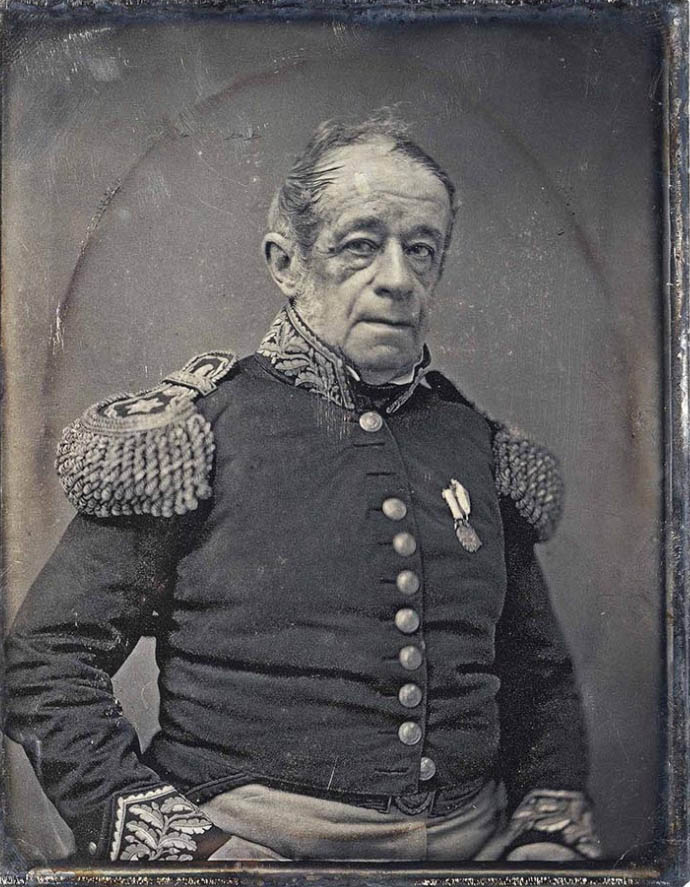
- Daguerreotype of Álvarez Thomas, 1850s

Interim Supreme Director of the United Provinces of the Río de la Plata
- In office 21 April 1815 – 16 April 1816
- Preceded by: Carlos María de Alvear
- Succeeded by: Antonio González de Balcarce

Personal details
- Born: 15 February 1787 Arequipa
- Died: 20 July 1857 (aged 70) Buenos Aires
- Profession: Military officer; politician

José Ignacio Álvarez Thomas (15 February 1787 – 20 July 1857) was a Peruvian-born Argentine military officer, statesman and diplomat. He served as interim Supreme Director of the United Provinces of the Río de la Plata between 6 May 1815 and 16 April 1816, in the transitional period following the fall of Carlos María de Alvear and prior to the acting directorship of Antonio González de Balcarce. He later held ministerial and diplomatic posts in Peru and Chile and lived in exile during the rule of Juan Manuel de Rosas.

== Early life and military career ==
Álvarez Thomas was born in Arequipa, then capital of a Peruvian intendancy, son of Spanish official Antonio Álvarez y Jiménez, governor-intendant of Arequipa, and María Isabel Thomás y Rancé, born in Barcelona from a family of French exiles. He moved to Buenos Aires with his family in 1797 and joined local forces at the turn of the century. He took part in the defense during the British invasions of the River Plate (1806–1807) and subsequently in the revolutionary process after the May Revolution of 1810.

== Rise to power (1815) ==
In early April 1815, amid conflict with the Federal League, Álvarez Thomas led the forces that refused to continue the march toward Santa Fe—an episode known as the sublevación de Fontezuelas—which precipitated the resignation of Director Carlos María de Alvear on 15 April. The General Assembly designated José Rondeau as Director, but given his absence with the Army of the North, Álvarez Thomas was appointed Director interino del Estado and took the oath of office on 6 May 1815.

== Interim Supreme Director (1815–1816) ==
His administration faced the breakdown of relations with the Liga Federal and recurrent unrest in the Littoral. In September 1815 Buenos Aires reoccupied Santa Fe through the Ejército de Observación, but the position collapsed in March 1816 with the triumph of the federalist uprising; the ensuing crisis undermined Álvarez Thomas’s authority. On 16 April 1816 he presented his resignation to the Cabildo and the Junta de Observación, which accepted it; Antonio González de Balcarce was named acting Director until the Congress in Tucumán made a permanent appointment.

== Diplomatic service and later life ==
Between 1824 and 1827 Álvarez Thomas fulfilled missions as minister plenipotentiary to Peru and Chile; archival catalogues preserve files of the Misión Álvarez a Perú y Chile and related correspondence. A contemporary of Manuel Belgrano, he authored an 1839 sketch about the general preserved by the Instituto Nacional Belgraniano.

Opposition to Juan Manuel de Rosas led to periods of imprisonment and exile in Brazil, Chile and Peru. After Rosas’s fall in 1852 he returned to Buenos Aires, where he died on 20 July 1857.

== Legacy ==
Álvarez Thomas has been treated in scholarship as a key transitional figure between the centralist Directorio and the federal reconfiguration of the provinces, with a career spanning military, executive and diplomatic roles.
