= Battle of Suipacha =

1810 Bolivian War of Independence battle

- Part of First Upper Peru campaign
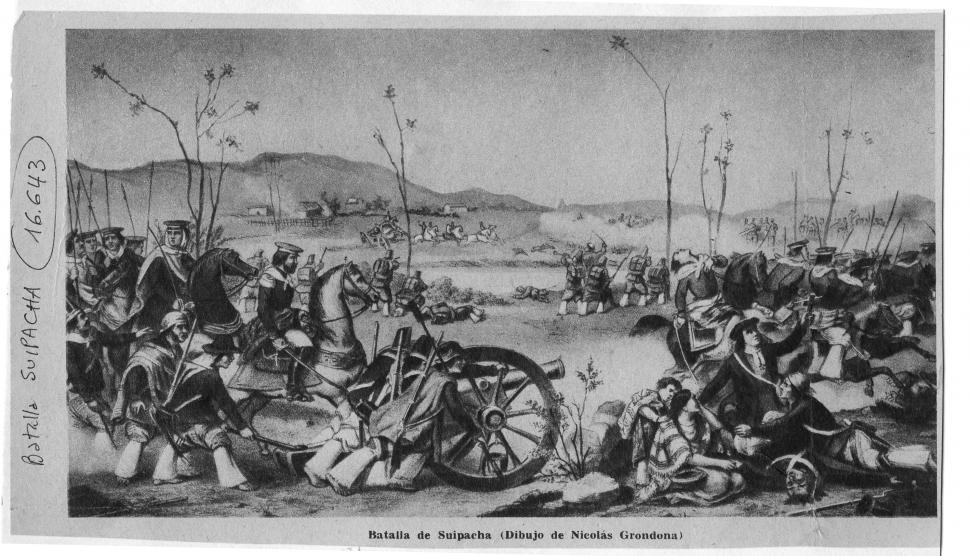
- Detail of a lithography of the battle
Date	7 November 1810
Location	Suipacha, Upper Peru (currently Bolivia) 21°34′22.4″S 65°36′16.1″W
Result	Provinces of the Río de la Plata victory

Belligerents
Provinces of the Río de la Plata (Note: The Provinces of the Río de la Plata were loyal to the Junta of Buenos Aires.)	Viceroyalty of Peru (Note: The Viceroyalty of Peru was loyal to the Council of Regency of Spain and the Indies.)

Commanders and leaders
(Spain) Antonio González Balcarce (Spain) Juan José Castelli	(Spain) José de Córdoba y Rojas (Spain) Vicente Nieto

Units involved
(Spain) Army of Peru	Royal Army of Peru

Strength
600 soldiers 10 field guns	800 soldiers 4 field guns

Casualties and losses
12 wounded and one dead	40 dead and 150 prisoners
- Location within Bolivia Battle of Suipacha (South America) Battle of Suipacha (America)

The Battle of Suipacha was fought on 7 November 1810 in Bolivia during the Bolivian War of Independence between the Spanish colonial army and the Republican forces sent by the Primera Junta from Buenos Aires. At the time, Bolivia was known as Upper Peru. It was the first decisive defeat of the Royalists by Republican forces. The battle took place 25 km (16 mi) southeast of Tupiza, near the small town of Suipacha, on the margin of the San Juan del Oro river in the Sud Chichas province, Potosí Department. In today Bolivia.

== Background ==
An earlier rebellion in Upper Peru during 1809 had been crushed by Royalist forces under the command of Generals Vicente Nieto and José de Córdoba y Rojas, leaving the region firmly under Spanish control. After the 1810 May Revolution, the Republicans sent an expeditionary army, led by Antonio González Balcarce, to Upper Peru with the mission of conducting a reconnaissance of the region. Departing from Buenos Aires, its ranks swelled en route as volunteers joined the march. Among these was a group of gauchos led by Martín Miguel de Güemes, who would go on to play a key role in the southern revolution. By the time the expedition reached Upper Peru, it was 600 men strong with 10 field pieces.

== A swift action ==
After an earlier action at Cotagaita on 27 October in which they were repulsed, Republican forces withdrew and occupied a position on the southern bank of the Suipacha River, around the small town of Nazareno. Having received reinforcements, the Royalists attacked this position with 800 men and 2 field guns but were beaten when the Republicans counter-attacked their left flank. Subsequently the Republicans were able to attack the Royalists camp and force a general withdrawal. The battle had last only 30 minutes. The victory was also followed by a general uprising in Upper Peru, which led to the capture and execution of the Spanish Governor Francisco de Paula Sanz at Potosi. Royalist generals Nieto and Córdoba were also shot by a firing squad. The Republican army then continued to advance north to the Desaguadero River.

== Aftermath ==
The victory at Suipacha had a strong effect on morale, which was shown in the celebrations in Potosí on November 10 and in Buenos Aires where the Junta authorized all the combatants to wear an arm band with the inscription "La patria a los vencedores de Tupiza" (the motherland to the victors of Tupiza). From a political point of view, the battle was decisive, because it did secure for a long time the hegemony of the Revolutionary forces over the major part of the former Viceroyalty of the Río de la Plata.

The Tupiza battle honour arm patch is kept by the 2nd Infantry Regiment of the Argentine Army in its dress uniforms.
