= Antonio González de Balcarce =

Argentine military commander

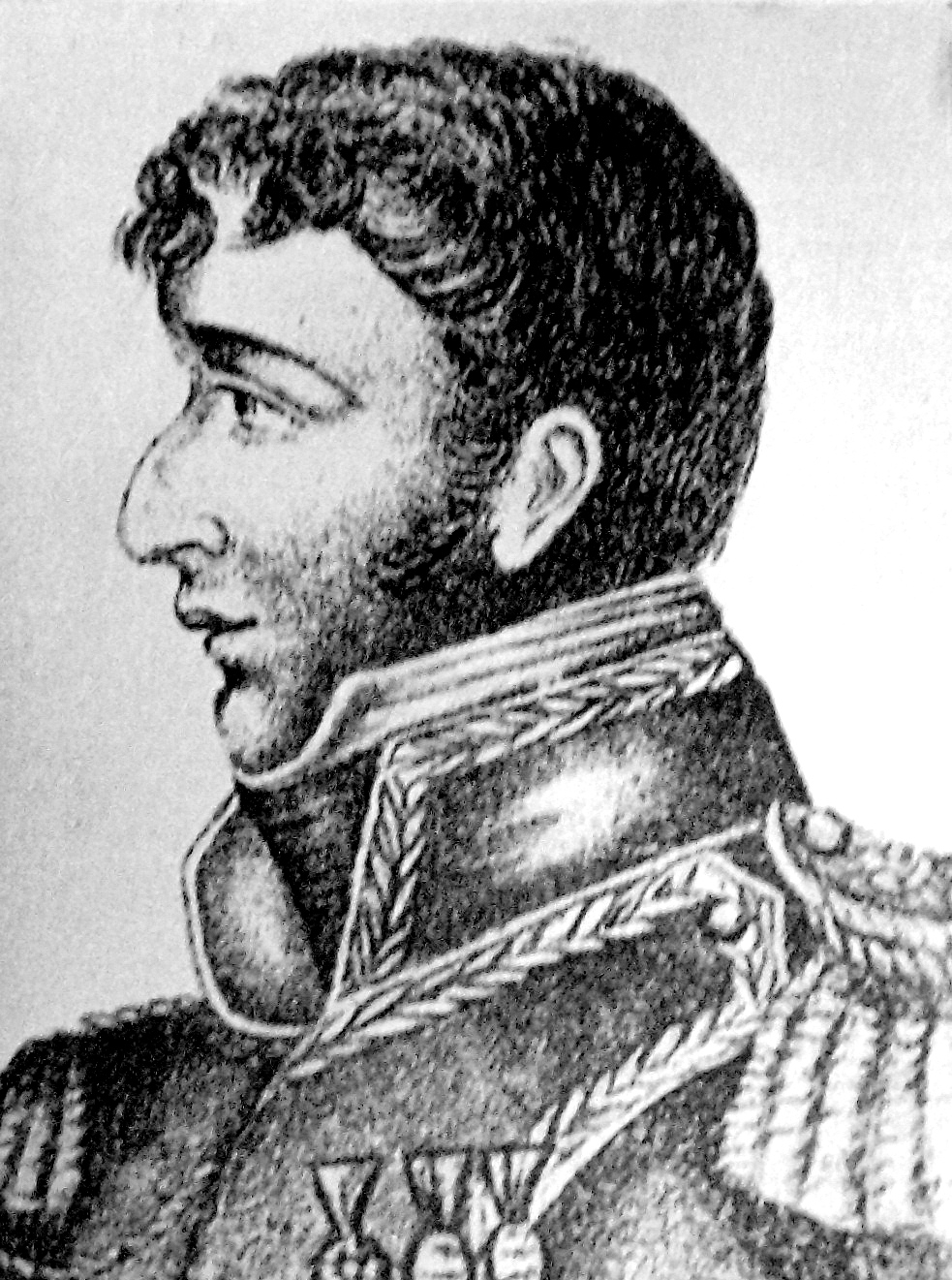
- Balcarce's portrait

Interim Supreme Director of the United Provinces of the Río de la Plata
- In office 16 April 1816 – 11 July 1816
- Preceded by: Ignacio Álvarez Thomas
- Succeeded by: Juan Martín de Pueyrredón

Personal details
- Born: June 24, 1774 Buenos Aires
- Died: August 5, 1819 (aged 45) Buenos Aires
- Education: Real Colegio San Carlos
- Profession: Military officer; politician

Antonio González de Balcarce (24 June 1774 – 5 August 1819) was an Argentine soldier and statesman of the independence era. He briefly served as interim Supreme Director of the United Provinces of the Río de la Plata between April and July 1816, and earlier led the patriot victory at the Battle of Suipacha (7 November 1810), the first major triumph of the revolutionary forces in Upper Peru. He was also governor-intendant of Buenos Aires during 1814, and later served as second-in-command to José de San Martín in Chile.

== Early life and military career ==
González de Balcarce was born in Buenos Aires, then part of the Viceroyalty of Peru. He joined the provincial forces as a cadet of the Blandengues corps in 1788. During the British invasions of the River Plate he defended Montevideo and was captured in 1807; released in Europe, he subsequently fought in Spain during the Peninsular War.

== May Revolution and Upper Peru campaign ==
After returning to Buenos Aires, González de Balcarce took part in the May Revolution of 1810. He was appointed to the first auxiliary expedition to Upper Peru and achieved the victory at Suipacha on 7 November 1810, regarded as the first major success of the patriot arms in the region.

== Governor-Intendant of Buenos Aires ==
In 1814 he held the post of governor-intendant (gobernador intendente) of Buenos Aires. Contemporary documents preserved by the Academia Nacional de la Historia refer to him in that capacity, including a petition dated 4 July 1814 addressed to “the Governor-Intendant of Buenos Aires, General Antonio González Balcarce.”

== Interim Supreme Director (1816) ==
Following the resignation of Ignacio Álvarez Thomas, the General Constituent Assembly designated González de Balcarce as interim head of state. Archival and prosopographical reconstructions place his term from 17 April to 11 July 1816, pending the arrival and installation of the elected Supreme Director, Juan Martín de Pueyrredón. The Gazeta de Buenos Ayres recorded official notices relating to his assumption of authority in April 1816.

== Army of the Andes and campaigns in Chile ==
After Pueyrredón took office, González de Balcarce joined the Army of the Andes. During the campaign in Chile he acted as San Martín’s second-in-command and took part in the operations leading to the victory at Maipú (5 April 1818). Contemporary and later compilations from the Instituto Nacional Sanmartiniano and the Museo Histórico Nacional identify him as “Segundo Jefe del Ejército Unido” in that campaign.

== Illness and death ==
He fell ill during the Chilean operations and returned to Buenos Aires, where he died on 5 August 1819. The site of his birthplace is today occupied by the former National Congress building (Balcarce 139), currently the headquarters of the Academia Nacional de la Historia.

== Legacy ==
González de Balcarce is commemorated in numerous toponyms in Argentina. The Partido de Balcarce (Buenos Aires Province) bears his name and local institutional histories recall his role at Suipacha and in the Chilean campaign. On official anniversaries the national government highlights his command at Suipacha as an early milestone of the independence struggle.
