= Historiography of the May Revolution =

Historical study of the May Revolution, Argentine independence movement

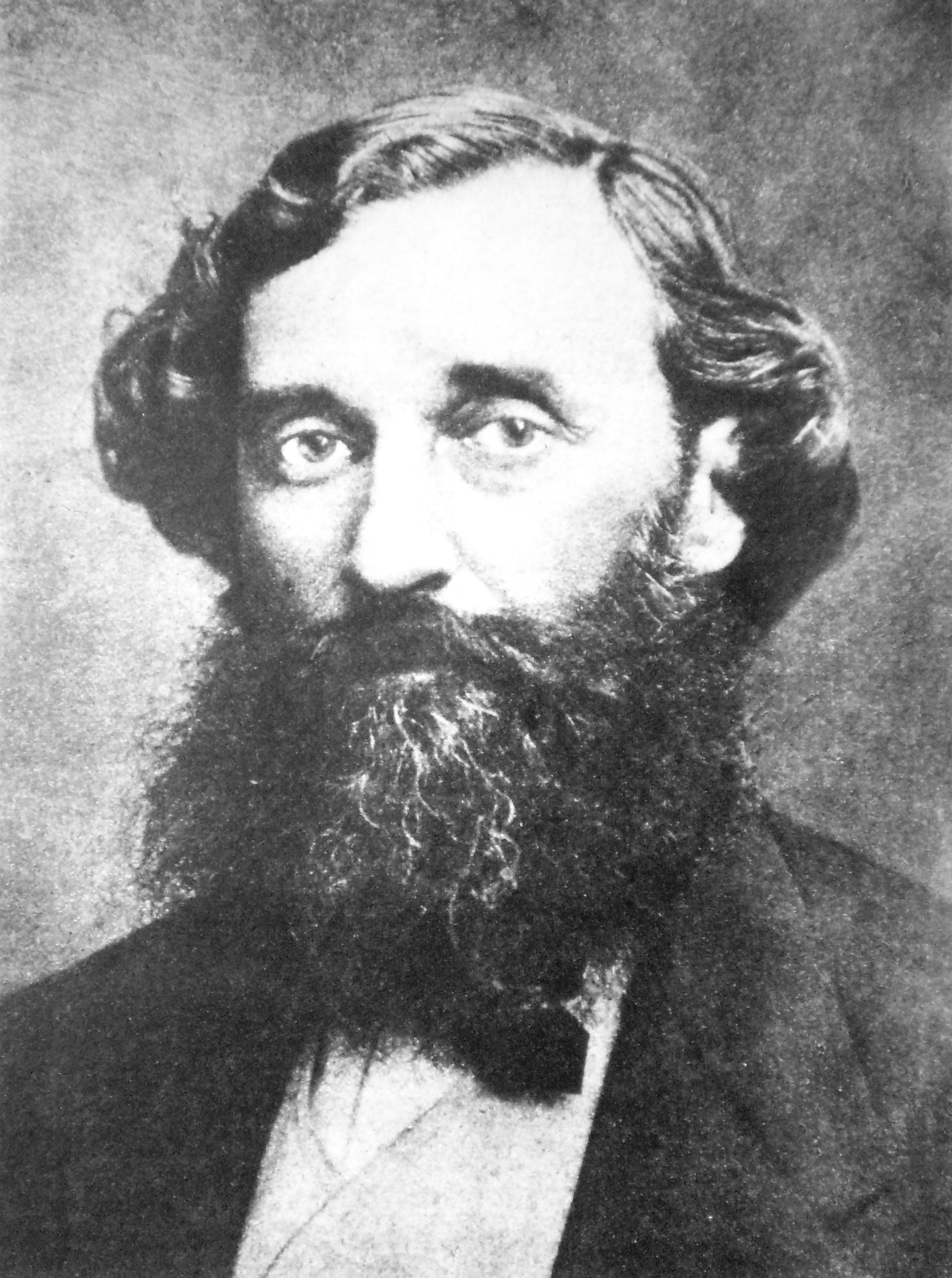
Bartolomé Mitre wrote one of the first historical interpretations of the May Revolution.

Historiographical studies of the May Revolution started in the second half of the 19th century in Argentina and have extended to modern day. All historiographical perspectives agree in considering the May Revolution as the turning point that gave birth to the modern nation of Argentina, and that the Revolution was unavoidable in 1810. The main topics of disagreement between Argentine historians are the specific weight of the diverse causes of the May Revolution, who were the leaders of it among the different involved parties, whenever there was popular support for it or not, and whenever the loyalty to the captive Spanish king Ferdinand VII was real or an elaborate masquerade to conceal pro-independence purposes.

== Factual concerns ==
Historians do not face many doubts or unknown details. The most important details were properly recorded at the time, and made available to the public by the Primera Junta as patriotic propaganda. Because of this, the different historical views on the topic differ on interpretations of the meanings, causes and consequences of the events rather than the accuracy of the depiction of the event themselves. The modern historical vision of the revolutionary events do not differ significantly from the contemporary ones.

The only factual topics that remain unconfirmed are the quotes and speeches made at the Open Cabildo or the audience with Cisneros, as the quotes kept do not come from transcriptions or recordings but from memories written years later or from oral tradition. Another disputed topic is the existence or not of the Operations plan, a secret document allegedly written by Mariano Moreno and setting harsh way for the Primera Junta to achieve its goals. Supporters of it consider that it is coherent with the actions taken by the Junta, like the execution of Santiago de Liniers, while detractors consider it a literary forgery made by an enemy of the Revolution in order to harm its public image in Europe.

It is a topic of discussion which were the reasons to create a Junta with Cisneros, instead of following the results of the open cabildo in the first place. Historian Diego Abad de Santillán considers that the formula responded to Benito Lue y Riega's proposal of keeping the Viceroy in power along with partners or attachments, even though it was defeated at the open cabildo vote. Abad de Santillán argues that this formula made the lobbyists believe they could contain the growing threat of revolution. Félix Luna, on the other hand, considers that it was an effort to avoid further conflicts, by choosing a middle ground solution, conceding something to all involved parties. Cisneros would remain in office, but sharing the power with the criollos.

It is also unclear which person or group decided the members of the Primera Junta. Saavedra claims in his memoirs, as do liberal historians like Vicente Fidel López, that it was exclusively a product of the popular initiative. Others, such as historian Félix Luna, feel the proposal shows such a level of balance among the relevant political and ideological parties involved that it can't be considered as merely the result of an improvised popular initiative. The proposed President, Saavedra, made a decisive intervention in the revolution and had prestige among all parties involved. Juan José Paso, Manuel Belgrano, Juan José Castelli, and Mariano Moreno were lawyers influenced by the Age of Enlightenment, and the first three were former supporters of the Carlotist project. Juan Larrea and Domingo Matheu were peninsulars involved in commercial activities of some importance. Both of them were supporters of Martín de Álzaga, as was Moreno. Miguel de Azcuénaga was a military man with contacts in high society, and the priest Manuel Alberti represented the aspirations of the lower clergy. Miguel Angel Scenna points out in his book Las brevas maduras that "such balance could not have been the result of chance, or from influences from outside the local context, but of a compromise of the parties involved". Both authors deny the theory that the composition of the Junta may have been suggested by the British; there was no time for that, and there were no British people in Buenos Aires important enough to influence such matters. Finally, the idea of the junta being chosen by the military is unlikely; despite the presence of Saavedra as president of the junta, it wasn't a military Junta; the majority of its members were civilians. Even more, it included Mariano Moreno, whose enmity with Saavedra dated from the failed mutiny of 1809.

== Historiography ==
The first people who wrote about the Revolution were most of the protagonists themselves of it, writing memories, biographies or diaries. However, their works were motivated by other purposes than historiographic ones, such as to explain the reasons for their actions, clean their public images, or manifest their support or rejection for public figures or ideas of the time. For example, Manuel Moreno wrote the biography of his brother Mariano to use it as propaganda for the Revolution in Europe, and Cornelio Saavedra wrote his autobiography at a moment when his image was highly questioned, to justify himself before his sons. Some points shared between those writings are the mentions to the British Invasions as a clear antecedent, the pride about the nonviolent nature of the Revolution at its first stages, the rejection to the later developments of the Argentine Civil War, and the description of the events as the recovery of the sovereignty delegated to the kKing.

The first remarkable historiographical school of interpretation of the history of Argentina was founded by Bartolomé Mitre, in his book Historia de Belgrano y de la Independencia Argentina. Mitre regarded the May Revolution as an iconic expression of political egalitarianism, the conflict between modern freedoms and oppression represented by the Spanish monarchy, and the attempt to establish a national organization on constitutional principles as opposed to the leadership of the caudillos. Mitre introduced the idea that the nation of Argentina existed prior to 1810, and that it was subjugated up to that point by the Spanish authorities.

Meanwhile, Esteban Echeverría epitomized the ideals of May in the concepts of progress and democracy. In the future, these concepts would be the axis around which revisionist history would differ from the canonical history in reference to the events of May. The canonical version claimed progress and justify the abandonment or delay the realization of democratic ideals in order not to risk the economic prosperity of society arguing that even then was not able to properly take advantage of political freedom. This situation was known as the establishment of the "Possible Republic." Mitre and Echeverría were part of the '37 Generation, a group of romantic authors born during the revolution itself and formed in the local context generated after it. Those authors did not work purely in intellectual fields, but took instead active part in the political events of their time, and strongly opposed the governor Juan Manuel de Rosas. They were closer to the unitarians than to the federalists, but were not fully unitarians either: they thought that it wasn't enough to apply directly the new ideas generated in Europe or the United States, but instead to adapt them to the local contexts of the Río de la Plata. They choose the May Revolution as the point to mark the birth of the nation because of their rejection to the Spanish or aboriginal cultures.

The last years of the 19th century and the beginning of the 20th were marked in Argentina by a growing industrialization process and the arrival of huge numbers of European immigrants. Historiographical studies were increased by the "New Historical school", in order to forge a "national identity", and the May Revolution had great prominence. There were discussions about the level of influence that the many causes of the May Revolution actually had, or whose interventions were the most decisive, but two points shared by all historians were to consider the May Revolution as the birth of Argentina, and to consider it an inevitable consequence of the causes that led to it (meaning, the chance of the May Revolution never taking place is not considered a feasible possibility by historians). There was also a subtle change: the scope of the revolution as a subject of study originally started with the events of May 1810 in Buenos Aires and kept going on for decades. They were later split, and the name "May Revolution" made reference only to events that led to the removal of Cisneros and the creation of the Primera Junta. A new element added by those historians was to consider, either to support or reject the idea, whenever there was an active and strong popular support for the Revolution, instead of explaining it solely around the actions of a limited number of enlightened men. Nevertheless, they kept the previous approaches for the most part.

The academic consensus of the end of the 19th century began to be questioned by the time of the World Wars, when liberalism lost its former hegemony and fascism and left-wing ideologies became important. Liberalism attempted to impose an ultimate and unquestionable historical perspective, though Ricardo Levene and the National Academy of History. This school of thought kept most of the viewpoints of Mitre. Left-wing authors opposed it with a revisionist production, based in nationalism and anti-imperialism. However, revisionists would work mainly with the historiography of Juan Manuel de Rosas, Justo José de Urquiza, Domingo Faustino Sarmiento or Mitre himself, without working much with the War of Independence, and in fact José de San Martín was equally supported by both genres. Nevertheless, they deemphasized the idea of a conflict between criollos and peninsulars, and described it instead as a conflict between liberalism and absolutism. The fascist author Hugo Wast would describe the Revolution as a military coup carried out by military leaders, and where the population was completely uninvolved.

The 150º anniversary of the May Revolution found the liberal and revisionist historiographies opposing each other more strongly. The senator from Corrientes J. Aníbal Dávila promoted the republication of old documents so that "the intentions of the antihistory of Argentina does not confuse the current generations, the masses and the youth with misleading slogans". José María Rosa would react by stating that the Revolution was carried out by the masses and that those were shadowed by other figures by liberal historians seeking to falsify history. The perspectives of Rosa found great acceptance in society and are currently part of the Argentine historic common sense.

By the 1970 decade authors like Tulio Halperin Donghi or José Carlos Chiaramonte attempted to provide a less absolute perspective about the May Revolution, by making detailed analysis of the local and international contexts and the possible options that the revolutionaries had at their disposal, with the Revolution being one option among many others.

== Disputes ==
=== Revolutionary purposes ===
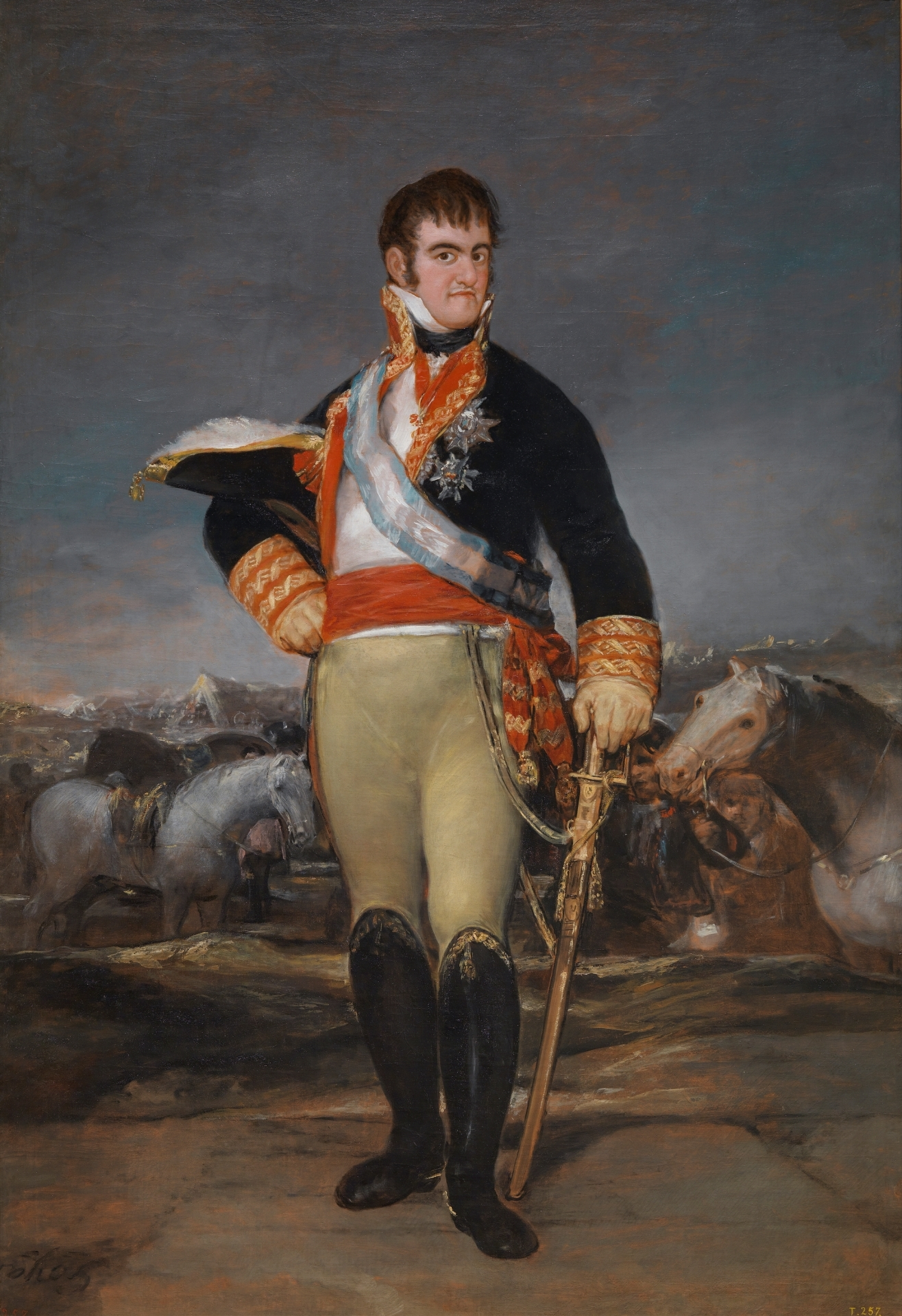
The May Revolution declared loyalty to Ferdinand VII of Spain.

The government created on May 25 was pronounced loyal to the deposed Spanish king Ferdinand VII, but historians do not agree on whenever such loyalty was genuine or not. Since Mitre, many historians consider that such loyalty was merely a political deception to gain factual autonomy. The Primera Junta did not pledged allegiance to the Regency Counsel of Spain and the Indies, an agency of the Spanish monarchy still in operation, and in 1810 the possibility that Napoleon Bonaparte was defeated and Ferdinand returned to the throne (which would finally happen on December 11, 1813 with the signing of the Treaty of Valençay) still seemed remote and unlikely. The purpose of the deception would have been to gain time to strengthen the position of the patriotic cause, avoiding the reactions that may have led by a revolution, on the grounds that monarchical authority was still respected and that no revolution took place. The ruse is known as the "Mask of Ferdinand VII" and would have been upheld by the Primera Junta, the Junta Grande, and the First and Second Triumvirates. The Assembly of Year XIII was intended to declare independency, but failed to do so because of other political conflicts between its members; however, it suppressed mentions to Ferdinand VII from official documents. The supreme directors held an ambivalent attitude until the declaration of independence of 1816.

For Britain the change was favorable, as it facilitated trade with the cities of the area without seeing it hampered by the monopoly that Spain maintained over their colonies. However, Britain prioritized the war in Europe against France, allied with the Spanish power sector that had not yet been submitted, and could not appear to support American independentist movements or allow military attention of Spain being divided into two different fronts. Consequently, they pushed for independence demonstrations not being made explicit. This pressure was exerted by Lord Strangford, the British ambassador at the court of Rio de Janeiro, expressing support to the Junta, but conditioned "...if the behavior is consistent and that Capital retained on behalf of Mr. Dn. Fernando VII and his legitimate successors." However, the following conflicts between Buenos Aires, Montevideo and Artigas led to internal conflicts in the British front, between Strangford and the Portuguese regent John VI of Portugal.

Since Juan Bautista Alberdi, later historians such as Norberto Galasso, Luis Romero or José Carlos Chiaramonte held in doubt the interpretation made by Mitre, and designed a different one. Alberdi thought that "The Argentine revolution is a chapter of the Hispanoamerican revolution, which is such of the Spanish one, and this, as well, of the European revolution." They did not consider it a dispute between independentism and colonialism, but instead a dispute between the new libertarian ideas and absolutism, without the intention to cut the relation with Spain, but to reformulate it. Thus, it would have the characteristics of a civil war instead. Some points that would justify the idea would be the inclusion of Larrea, Matheu and Belgrano in the Junta and the later appearance of José de San Martín: Larrea and Matheu were Spanish, Belgrano studied for many years in Spain, and San Martín had lived so far most of his adult life waging war in Spain against the French. When San Martín talked about the enemies, he called them "royalists" or "Goths", but never "Spanish".

According to those historians, the Spanish revolution against absolutism got mixed with the Peninsular War. Charles IV was seen as an absolutist king, and by standing against his father many Spanish got the wrong understanding that Ferdinand VII sympathized with the new enlighten ideas. Thus, the revolutions made in the Americas in the name of Ferdinand VII (such as the May Revolution, the Chuquisaca Revolution or the one in Chile) would have been seeking to replace the absolutist power with others made under the new ideas. Even if Spain was at war with France, the ideals themselves of the French Revolution (liberty, equality and fraternity) were still respected by those people. However, those revolutions pronounced themselves enemies of Napoleon, but did not face any active French military attack, which promoted instead fights between Spanish armies for keeping the old order of maintaining the new one. This situation would have changed with the final defeat of Napoleon and the return of Ferdinand VII to the throne, as he restored absolutism and persecuted the new libertarian ideas within Spain. For the people in South America, the idea of remaining as part of the Spanish Empire, but with a new relation with the mother country, was no longer a feasible option: the only remaining options at this point would have been a return to absolutism, or independentism.

==== Documents ====
Cornelio Saavedra spoke about the issue privately with Juan José Viamonte in a letter from 27 June 1811, addressing topics such as a known display of independentism by Máximo de Zamudio. This letter was subsequently rescued. In it, he explicitly mentioned the situation as a deception to avoid England from declaring war on them.

Foreign courts, and very specially the British one, demand nothing, save that we carry on the name of Ferdinand and the hate to Napoleon. Those two axis are why it isn't our declared enemy. Read by yourself the notice that has just been published in the British newspapers recently received (adjunted). In them you can see by yourself it is expressly said that the British court declares not to feel itself compeled by any convention to sustain a part of the Spanish monarchy against the other, for reason of some remaining disagreement among them about the type of government, in which they have to rule their respective systems, under the condition that they recognize their legitimate sovereign, and they oppose the tyranny and the usurpation of the France. Thus, if we did not recognize Ferdinand, Britain would have the right or feel itself obliged to sustain our enemies that do so, and would declare war upon us, same as if we did not despise Napoleon; and what forces does the poor viceroyalty of Buenos Aires have to resist this power in the first steps of its childhood? Or what need does it have to willingly attract for itself this powerful and external enemy when it hasn't ended with the interior ones that keep bothering us to this day? Among those powerful considerations, the free citizen Zamudio wants it to be shouted, independence, independence. What is lost if by written words we say Ferdinand, Ferdinand, and with works we pave the way for the Congress, sole competent tribunal that can and must establish and decide the system or form of government deemed convenient, agreed upon by the deputies that will compose it?

On the other hand, the Congress of Tucuman issued a manifest in 1817, more than a year after the declaration of independence. It detailed abuses made by the Spanish, and former chances for separatism that were not used. Of course, once the independence was declared openly, there would not have been any further need for keeping a masquerade of submission. In the specific case of the May Revolution, it says:

In the meantime we established our government junta similar to those of Spain. Its establishment was merely provisional and in the name of the captive king Ferdinand. Viceroy Don Baltasar Hidalgo de Cisneros wrote instructions to the governors to prepare for the civil war and arm some provinces against the others.

== Groups involved ==
The groups who supported or carried out the revolution were not completely homogeneous in their purpose, and several had disparate interests together. The progressive Criollos and young people, represented on the Junta by Moreno, Castelli, Belgrano and Paso, aspired to far-reaching political, economic and social reforms. Moreover, the military and bureaucrats, whose views were carried forward by Saavedra, simply wanted a renewal of office holders, aspiring to remove the Spanish from the exclusive use of power, but inheriting their privileges and powers. The merchants and landlords subordinated the political issues to the economic decisions, particularly with respect to the opening or not of trade with England. Finally, some groups shuffled possibilities to replace the authority of the Regency Council with that of Charlotte of Portugal or the British crown, but such projects have had limited impact. These groups worked together for the common goal of expelling Cisneros from power, but after the Primera Junta was settled they began to express their internal differences.

No religious factors were involved in the revolution: all the revolutionaries and royalists agreed to support Catholicism. Still, most church leaders opposed the revolution. In Upper Peru the royalists and religious authorities sought to equate the revolutionaries with heretics, but the revolutionary leaders always promoted conciliatory policies in the religious aspects. For instance, Mariano Moreno translated The Social Contract to Spanish, but left aside the chapters that criticized religion. The priests and monks, however, were divided geographically: the provinces "from below" were loyal to the revolution, while those of Upper Peru preferred to remain loyal to the monarchy.

== See also ==
- May Revolution
- Historiography of Argentina

== Bibliography ==
- Gelman, Jorge; Raúl Fradkin (2010). Doscientos años pensando la Revolución de Mayo. Buenos Aires: Sudamericana. ISBN 978-950-07-3179-9.
