= Otuyo =

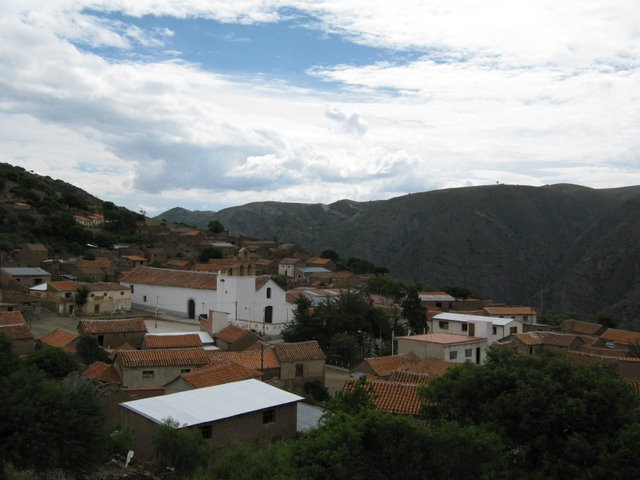
- Otuyo

- Location in Bolivia
- Coordinates: 19°29′12″S 65°13′50″W
- Country: Bolivia
- Department: Potosí Department
- Province: Cornelio Saavedra Province
- Municipality: Betanzos Municipality
- Canton: Otuyo Canton

Population (2001)
  - Total: 222
- Time zone: GMT-4

Otuyo is a locality in the Betanzos Municipality, Cornelio Saavedra Province, Potosí Department, Bolivia. It is the seat of the Otuyo Canton.

The president of the Argentine First Junta, Cornelio Saavedra, was born close to this town and he was baptized in the church of Otuyo.
