= T'uqu Chaka =

Mountain in Bolivia

- Location within Bolivia

Highest point
- Elevation: 4,164 m (13,661 ft)
- Coordinates: 19°19′17″S 65°40′03″W

Geography
- Location: Bolivia; Potosí Department
- Parent range: Andes

T'uqu Chaka (Quechua t'uqu a niche, hole or gap in the wall, chaka bridge, "niche bridge", also spelled Tokho Chaca) is a 4,164-metre-high (13,661 ft) mountain in the Andes of Bolivia. It is located in the Potosí Department, Cornelio Saavedra Province, Tacobamba Municipality. T'uqu Chaka lies between Qiñwa Qullu in the northeast and Wañuma Q'asa in the southwest. It is west of the Ch'aki Mayu (Quechua for "dry river"). Its waters flow to the Pillku Mayu (Quechua for "red river").

T'uqu Chaka is also the name of the small populated place northwest of the mountain.
