= Honours Suppression decree =

The Honours Suppression decree (Spanish: Decreto de Supresión de Honores) was a decree of the Primera Junta, first national government of Argentina, in 1810 which removed from its members the honours and privileges inherited from the former monarchic system. It was designed by the secretary Mariano Moreno.

== Context ==
The decree was motivated by an anecdote that took place some days before. When the revolutionaries in Buenos Aires received the news of the first military victory at the Battle of Suipacha, a small celebration was held. Mariano Moreno tried to join it, but the guards in the door did not recognize him and denied him the entry. Moreno would later learn that in the celebration the official Atanasio Duarte, who was drunk, proposed a brindis for "the first king and emperor of America, Don Cornelio Saavedra". Saavedra was the president of the Primera Junta.

Mariano Moreno wrote then the decree. The decree stated that the members of the Junta would have an equal social treatment than any other citizen, and it removed the social privileges or military escorts that viceroys used to have and which were adopted by the Junta by tradition. As for Duarte, Moreno wrote that his action, promoting a monarchic system, would deserve the capital punishment, but considering that he was drunk at the time, such penalty was lifted to just being banished from the country.

All members of the Junta ratified the decree, including Saavedra himself, who was the most damaged by it, because as president the privileges assigned to him were higher than those of the other members of the Junta.

== Historical perception ==
The decree is commonly considered a clear act of republicanism, ending a common trait of a monarchic society. Liberal historiography usually considers the anecdote to be promoted a sudden inspiration in Moreno to write the decree, but historian Miguel Ángel Scenna consider instead that Moreno had it already planned and that he simply employed the anecdote as an excuse to apply it. Historian José María Rosa provides yet another interpretation: he considers that the real crime of Duarte was to claim aloud that the Americas would have their own King, other than Ferdinand VII, which was a clear independentist gesture. The punishment towards him would not be based in that Moreno or the Junta weren't independentist as well, but in that they would be concealing their independentist ideas under the ruse of the Mask of Ferdinand VII.

== "Neither drunk nor asleep" ==
The text that condemns Atanasio Duarte and orders him to be banished states as justification that "An inhabitant of Buenos Aires neither drunk nor asleep should have expressions against the freedom of his country" (Spanish: Un habitante de Buenos Aires ni ebrio ni dormido debe tener expresiones contra la libertad de su país). The expression "Neither drunk nor asleep" ("Ni ebrio ni dormido") would later enter into the Argentine colloquial speech, as a quote meaning that something shouldn't be done under any circumstances, not even if the subject isn't completely aware of his own actions or their consequences.

== Bibliography ==
- Luna, Félix (2004). Grandes protagonistas de la Historia Argentina: Mariano Moreno (in Spanish). Buenos Aires: La Nación. ISBN 950-49-1248-6.
- Scenna, Miguel Ángel (2009). Mariano Moreno. Buenos Aires: H. Garetto Editor. ISBN 978-987-1494-05-4.
