= Milluni (Potosí) =

Mountain in Bolivia

- Location within Bolivia

Highest point
- Elevation: 4,606 m (15,112 ft)
- Coordinates: 19°23′11″S 65°32′53″W

Geography
- Location: Bolivia, Potosí Department
- Parent range: Andes

Milluni Aymara millu light brown, reddish, fair-haired, dark chestnut, -ni suffix to indicate ownership, "the brown one") is a 4,606-metre-high (15,112 ft) mountain in the Bolivian Andes. It is situated in the Potosí Department, Cornelio Saavedra Province, Tacobamba Municipality, near the border with the Tomás Frías Province, Potosí Municipality. Milluni lies south-east of the lake Urqu Qucha.
