= Betanzos Canton =

- Canton
- Country: Bolivia
- Department: Potosí Department
- Province: Cornelio Saavedra Province
- Municipality: Betanzos Municipality
- Seat: Betanzos

Population (2001)
  - Total: 7,362
  - Ethnicities: Quechua

Betanzos Canton is one of the cantons of the Betanzos Municipality, in the Cornelio Saavedra Province, in the Potosí Department in south-west Bolivia. During the census of 2001, it had 7,362 inhabitants. Its seat is Betanzos, which is also the capital of the Betanzos Municipality and Cornelio Saavedra Province.
