= Cornelio Saavedra Province =

Cornelio Saavedra
- Province
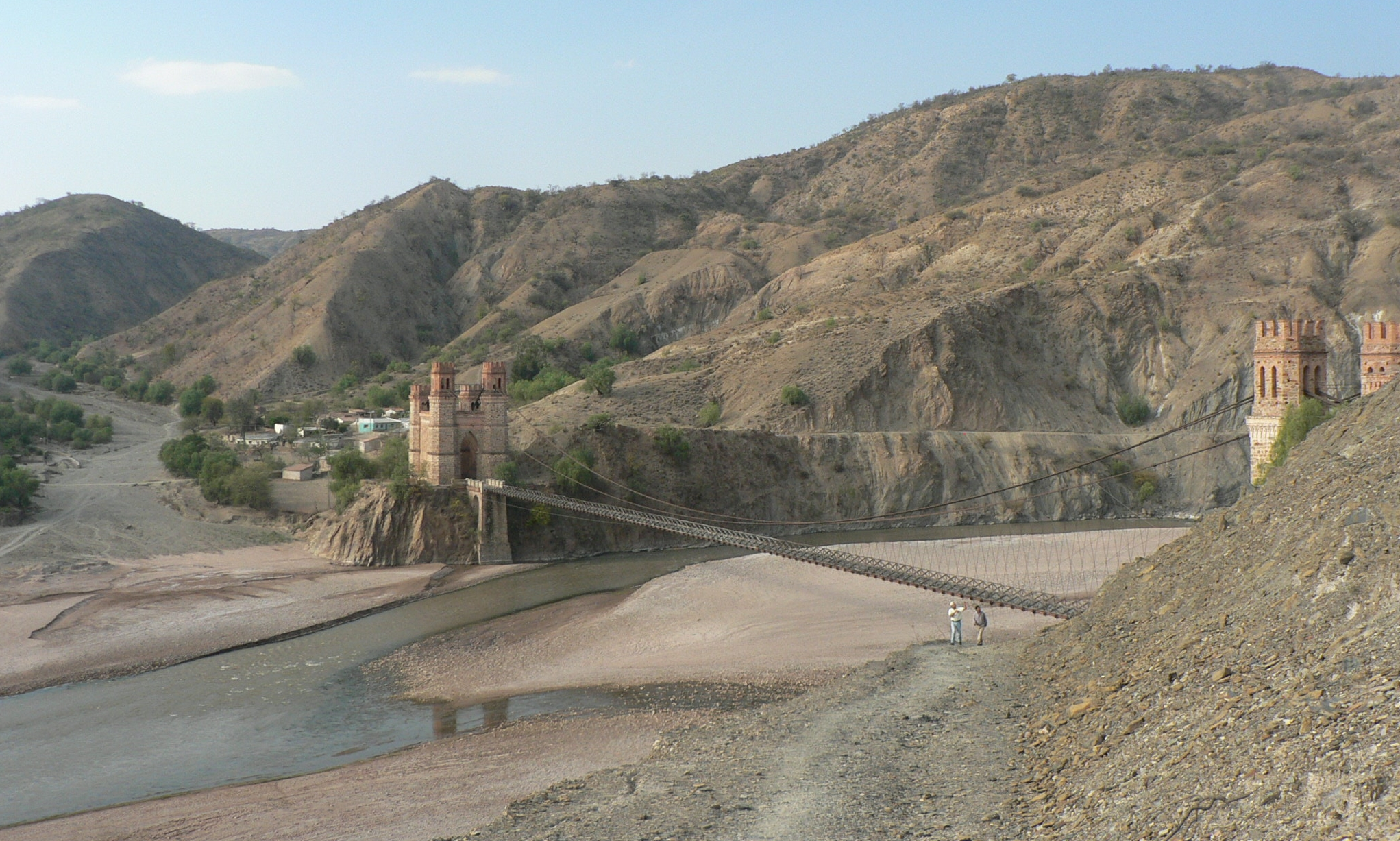
- The bridge "Puente Méndez" or "Puente Sucre" between Sucre and Potosí across Pillku Mayu

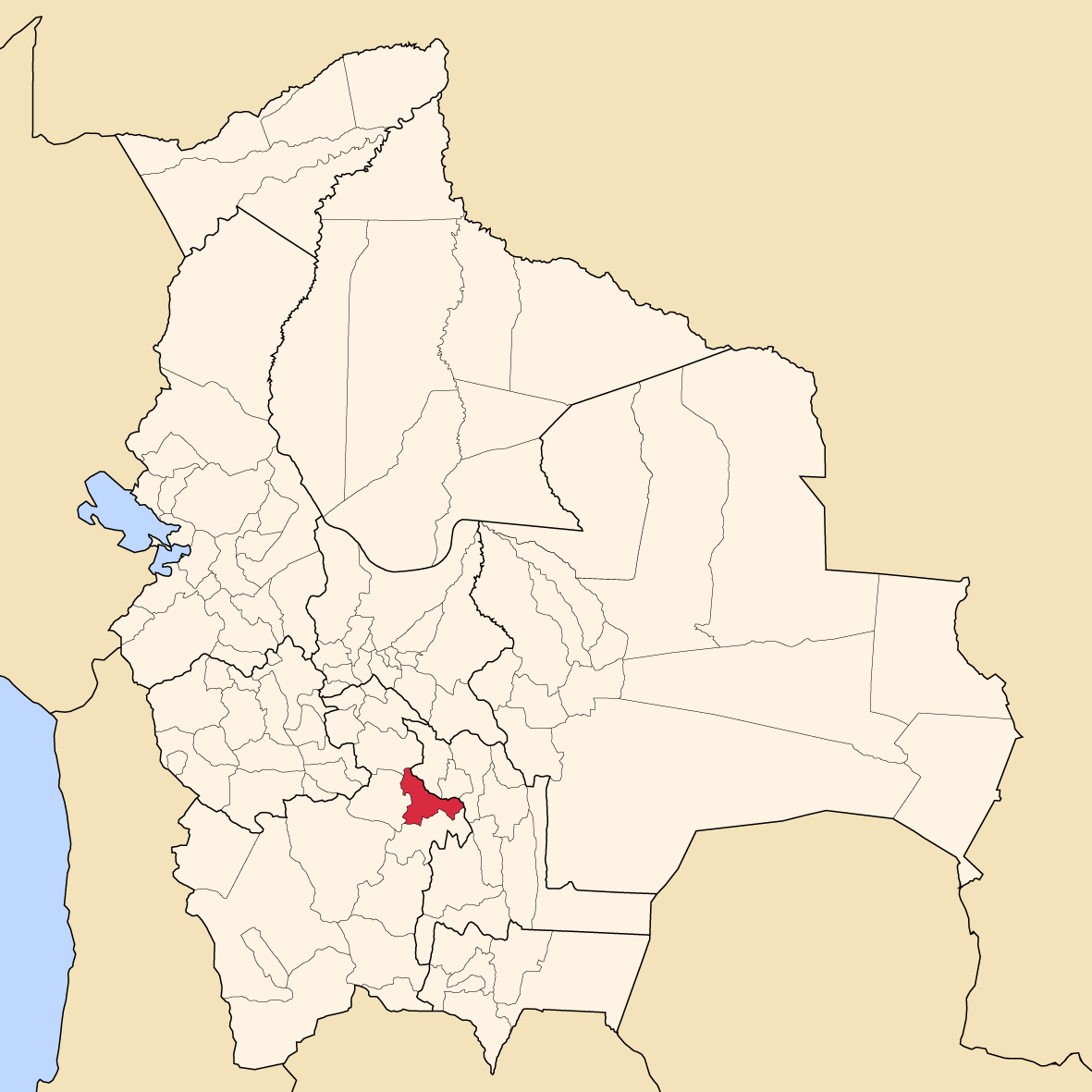
- Location of the Cornelio Saavedra Province within Bolivia

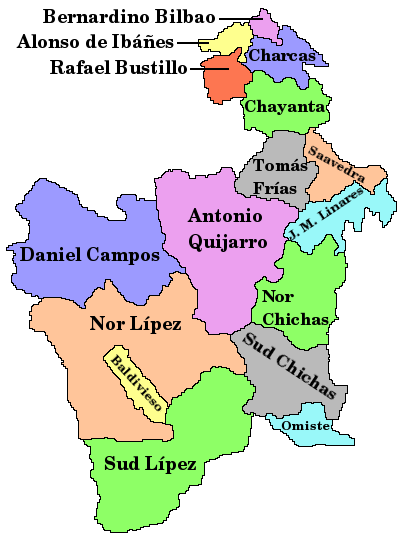
- Provinces of the Potosí Department
- Coordinates: 19°21′S 65°13′W
- Country: Bolivia
- Department: Potosí Department
- Municipalities: 3
- Cantons: 18
- Capital: Betanzos

Area
  - Total: 1,217 sq mi (3,153 km^{2})

Population (2024 census)
  - Total: 55,242
  - Density: 45.38/sq mi (17.52/km^{2})
  - Ethnicities: Quechua
- Time zone: UTC-4 (BOT)
- Area code: BO.PO.CS

Cornelio Saavedra is a province in the north-eastern parts of the Bolivian Potosí Department. The capital of the province is Betanzos with 4,168 inhabitants in the year 2001.

The province is named after the president of the Argentine First Junta, Cornelio Saavedra, who was born in Otuyo, Betanzos Municipality.

== Location ==
Cornelio Saavedra province is one of sixteen provinces in the Potosí Department. It is located between 18° 57' and 19° 44' South and between 64° 48' and 65° 39' West. It borders Chuquisaca Department in the northeast, Chayanta Province in the north, Tomás Frías Province in the west, and José María Linares Province in the south and southeast. The province extends over 95 km (59 mi) from east to west and 105 km (65 mi) from north to south.

== Division ==
The province comprises three separate municipalities which are further subdivided into cantons.

Section	Municipality	Seat
1st	Betanzos Municipality	Betanzos
2nd	Chaquí Municipality	Chaquí
3rd	Tacobamba Municipality	Tacobamba

== Population ==
The main language of the province is Quechua, spoken by 78%, while 47% of the population speaks Spanish. The population increased from 52,659 inhabitants (1992 census) to 58,706 (2001 census), an increase of 11.5%.

80% of the population have no access to electricity, 94% have no sanitary facilities. 69% of the population are employed in agriculture, 1% in mining, 10% in industry, 20% in general services. 89% of the population are Catholics, 8% Protestants.

The people are predominantly indigenous citizens of Quechua descent.

Ethnic group	Betanzos Municipality (%)	Chaquí Municipality (%)	Tacobamba Municipality (%)
Quechua	94.9	96.7	96.9
Aymara	0.1	0.2	0.2
Guaraní, Chiquitos, Moxos	0.1	0.0	0.1
Not indigenous	4.9	2.8	2.8
Other indigenous groups	0.0	0.2	0.0

== Geography ==
The river Pillku Mayu flows along the northern border of the province.

== Images ==
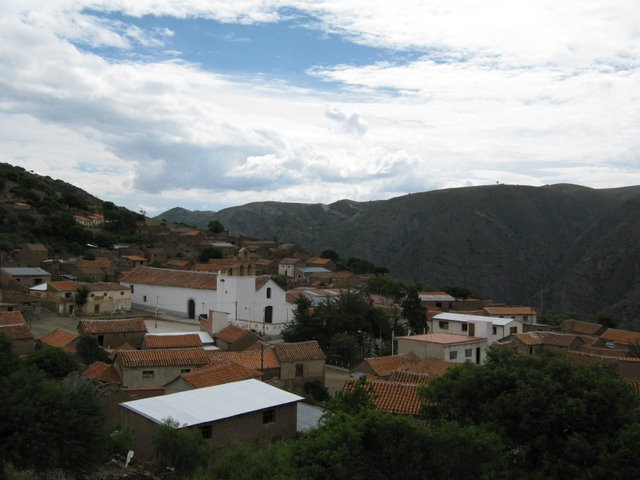
Otuyo

== See also ==
- Ch'aki Mayu
- Milluni
- Qiñwa Qullu
- Titi Pinkillu
- T'uqu Chaka
- Urqu Qucha
- Wañuma
- Yana Mayu
