= Wañuma (Bolivia) =

Mountain in Bolivia

- Location within Bolivia

Highest point
- Elevation: 4,202 m (13,786 ft)
- Coordinates: 19°19′58″S 65°38′50″W

Geography
- Location: Bolivia; Potosí Department
- Parent range: Andes

Wañuma (Aymara waña dry, uma water, "dry water", erroneously also spelled KHuañuma) is a 4,202-metre-high (13,786 ft) mountain in the Andes of Bolivia. It is located in the Potosí Department, Cornelio Saavedra Province, Tacobamba Municipality. Wañuma lies on the right bank of the Ch'aki Mayu (Quechua for "dry river"). Its waters flow to the Pillku Mayu (Quechua for "red river"):
