= Betanzos, Bolivia =

Betanzos
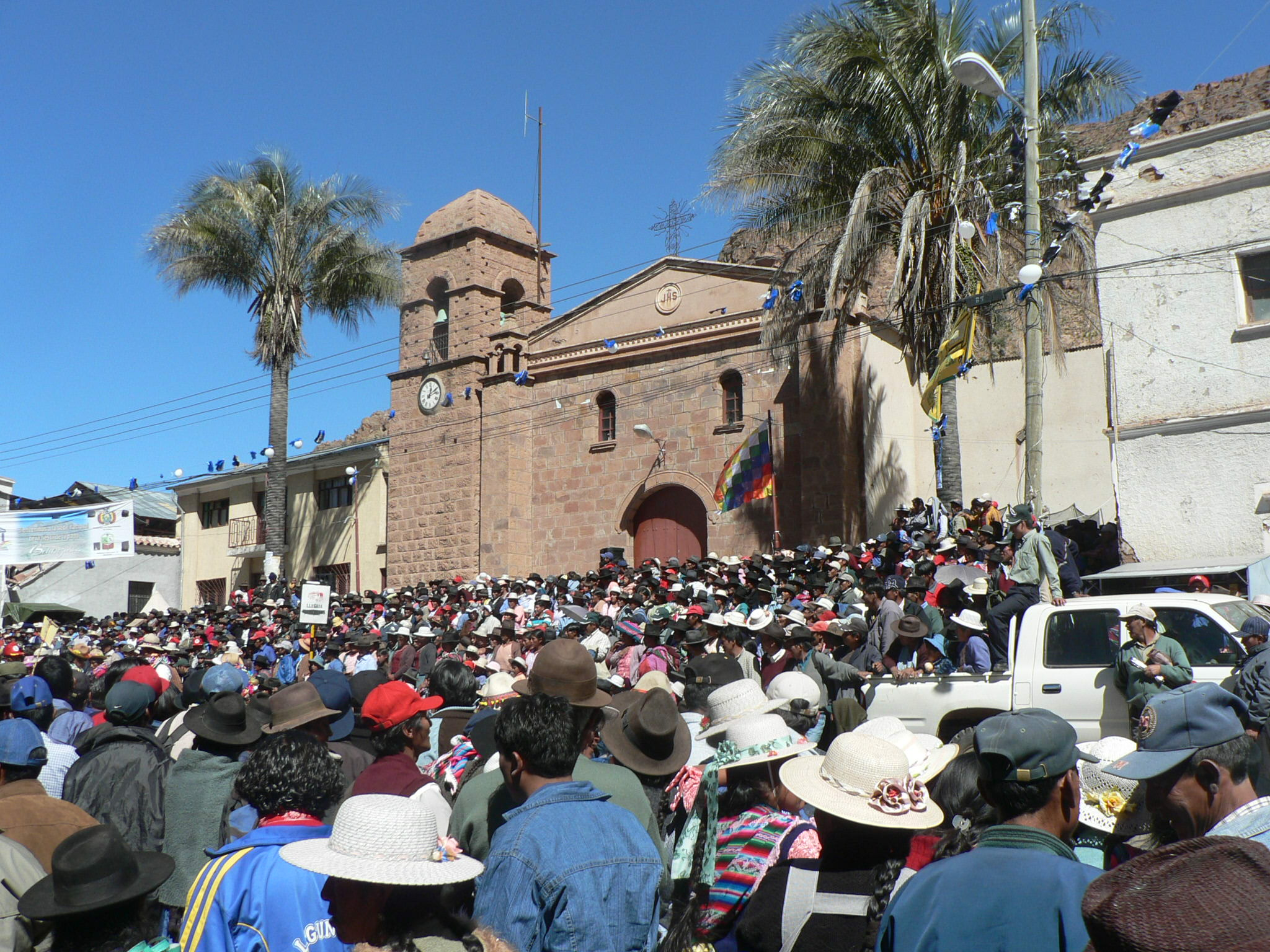

- Location in Bolivia
- Coordinates: 19°33′12″S 65°27′13″W
- Country: Bolivia
- Department: Potosí Department
- Province: Cornelio Saavedra Province
- Municipality: Betanzos Municipality
- Canton: Betanzos Canton
- Elevation: 10,915 ft (3,327 m)

Population (2012)
  - Total: 4,632
- Time zone: UTC-4 (BOT)

Betanzos is a town located in the Potosí Department of Bolivia. It is the capital of the Betanzos Canton, Betanzos Municipality and Cornelio Saavedra Province.

== Climate ==
Climate data for Chinoli, elevation 3,450 m (11,320 ft), (1978–2013)
Month	Jan	Feb	Mar	Apr	May	Jun	Jul	Aug	Sep	Oct	Nov	Dec	Year
Record high °C (°F)	28.1 (82.6)	28.0 (82.4)	28.6 (83.5)	29.1 (84.4)	30.0 (86.0)	28.1 (82.6)	25.2 (77.4)	28.3 (82.9)	29.1 (84.4)	32.0 (89.6)	29.8 (85.6)	29.0 (84.2)	32.0 (89.6)
Mean daily maximum °C (°F)	19.3 (66.7)	18.9 (66.0)	19.3 (66.7)	20.1 (68.2)	20.2 (68.4)	19.3 (66.7)	19.1 (66.4)	20.1 (68.2)	20.8 (69.4)	20.9 (69.6)	21.2 (70.2)	20.4 (68.7)	20.0 (67.9)
Daily mean °C (°F)	13.2 (55.8)	13.0 (55.4)	12.9 (55.2)	12.3 (54.1)	10.7 (51.3)	9.3 (48.7)	9.1 (48.4)	10.5 (50.9)	11.8 (53.2)	12.8 (55.0)	13.6 (56.5)	13.6 (56.5)	11.9 (53.4)
Mean daily minimum °C (°F)	7.0 (44.6)	6.9 (44.4)	6.4 (43.5)	4.5 (40.1)	1.4 (34.5)	−0.8 (30.6)	−0.9 (30.4)	0.9 (33.6)	2.9 (37.2)	4.7 (40.5)	6.1 (43.0)	6.9 (44.4)	3.8 (38.9)
Record low °C (°F)	−1.6 (29.1)	−2.1 (28.2)	−2.6 (27.3)	−9.1 (15.6)	−10.9 (12.4)	−14.2 (6.4)	−9.6 (14.7)	−9.1 (15.6)	−7.5 (18.5)	−10.2 (13.6)	−3.2 (26.2)	−4.4 (24.1)	−14.2 (6.4)
Average precipitation mm (inches)	110.7 (4.36)	80.1 (3.15)	57.5 (2.26)	19.8 (0.78)	1.3 (0.05)	1.2 (0.05)	1.6 (0.06)	4.4 (0.17)	9.4 (0.37)	34.4 (1.35)	41.2 (1.62)	76.7 (3.02)	438.3 (17.24)
Average precipitation days	15.3	12.5	10.2	4.6	0.6	0.3	0.4	1.0	2.5	6.4	7.4	11.4	72.6
Average relative humidity (%)	87.2	87.3	87.9	85.9	82.4	80.9	81.6	84.5	82	86.7	82.3	85.2	84.5
Source: Servicio Nacional de Meteorología e Hidrología de Bolivia
