= Causes of the May Revolution =

The May Revolution (Spanish: Revolución de Mayo) was a series of revolutionary political and social events that took place during the early nineteenth century in the city of Buenos Aires, capital of the Spanish Viceroyalty of the Río de la Plata, a colony of the Spanish Crown which at the time contained the present-day nations of Argentina, Bolivia, Paraguay and Uruguay. The consequence of the revolution was that the Viceroy Baltasar Hidalgo de Cisneros, was forced out from office, and the role of government was assumed by the Primera Junta. There are many reasons, both local and international, that promoted such developments.

== International causes ==
=== United States Declaration of Independence ===
The Declaration of Independence of the United States inspired similar movements in the Spanish colonies in South America.

The United States had emancipated themselves from the Kingdom of Great Britain in 1776, which provided a tangible example that led Criollos to believe that revolution and independence from Spain could be realistic aims. In the time between 1775 and 1783 the Thirteen Colonies started the American Revolution, first rejecting the governance of the Parliament of Great Britain, and later the British monarchy itself, and waged the American Revolutionary War against their former rulers. The changes were not only political, but also intellectual and social, combining both a strong government with personal liberties. The text of the Declaration of Independence stated that all men are created equal (and thus become equal before the law), and had unalienable rights to life, liberty and the pursuit of happiness. They had also chosen a republican form of government, instead of keeping a monarchic one. Even more, the fact that Spain aided the colonies in their struggle against Britain weakened the argument that ending allegiance to the mother country could be considered a crime.

=== French Revolution ===
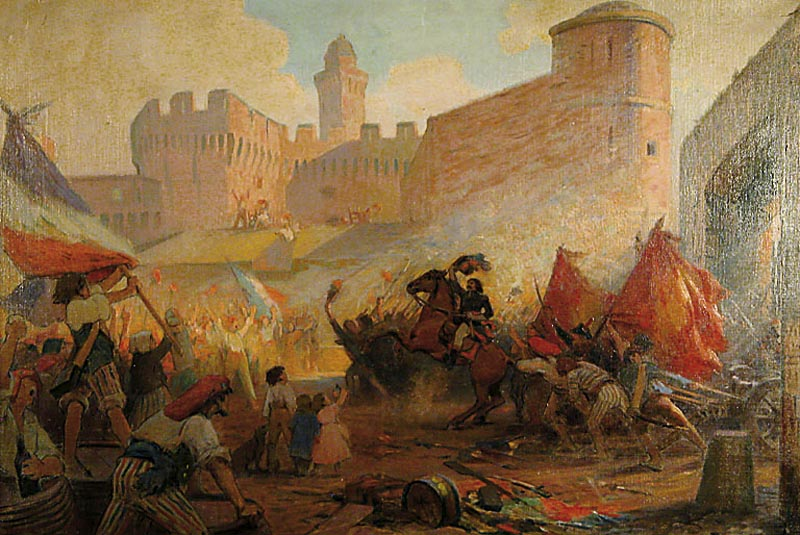
The French Revolution promoted new ideals that influenced local criollos.

The ideals of the French Revolution of 1789 were spreading as well. During the Revolution, centuries of monarchy were ended with the overthrow and execution of King Louis XVI and Queen Marie Antoinette, and the removal of the privileges of the nobility. The Declaration of the Rights of Man and of the Citizen was highly popular among the young Criollos. The French Revolution also boosted liberal ideals in political and economic fields. Some of the most notable political liberal authors, who opposed monarchies and absolutism, were Voltaire, Jean-Jacques Rousseau, Montesquieu, Denis Diderot and Jean Le Rond d'Alembert, while the most notorious economic liberal was Adam Smith. Liberal ideas also reached the church, and the concept of the divine right of kings started to be questioned. Francisco Suárez claimed that political power did not pass directly from God to the governor, but to the population and through it to the governor. According to Suarez, such power belongs to the people and is delegated to the governor, but if such governors did not serve the public good as they should, they would become tyrants and the people would have the right to fight them and choose new governors. The falling consensus about the divine right being legitimate gave room to monarchies being replaced by republics in France and the United States, but also to constitutional monarchies, such as in Great Britain.

However, the spread of such idea was mainly forbidden in the Spanish territories, as well as the traffic in related books or their unauthorized possession. Such blockades started when Spain declared war on France after the execution of Louis XVI, but remained after the peace treaty of 1796. Nevertheless, the events of 1789 and the statements of the French Revolution spread around Spain despite the efforts to keep them at bay. Even more, the National Convention declared that France would give shelter and aid to all populations aiming to become free, and made many plans to disrupt the power of Spain over their overseas colonies. Many enlightened Criollos came into contact with those authors and their works during university studies. such as Manuel Belgrano in Spain or Mariano Moreno, Juan José Castelli or Bernardo Monteagudo at the American university in Chuquisaca. Books from the US also found their way into the Spanish colonies through Caracas, due to the closeness of Venezuela to the United States and West Indies.

=== Industrial Revolution ===
The Industrial Revolution started in Britain, with manual labour and horse-drawn vehicles being replaced by machine-based manufacturing and transportation aided by railways and steam power. This led to dramatic increases in the productive capabilities of Britain, and the need of new markets to sell the surplus of coal, steel and clothes. The Napoleonic Wars, where Britain was at war with France, made this a difficult task, after Napoleon countered the British naval blockade with the Continental System, not allowing Britain to trade with any other European country. Thus, England needed to be able to trade with the Spanish colonies, but could not do so because they were restricted to trade only with their own metropoli. For this end they tried to conquer key cities during the British invasions, and after it to promote their emancipation. The Industrial Revolution also gave room to authors who proposed a liberal economy, like Adam Smith. François Quesnay compared the worldwide economy with a living organism, stating that economics worked beyond political power and should not be affected by it.

=== Peninsular War ===
The Third of May 1808

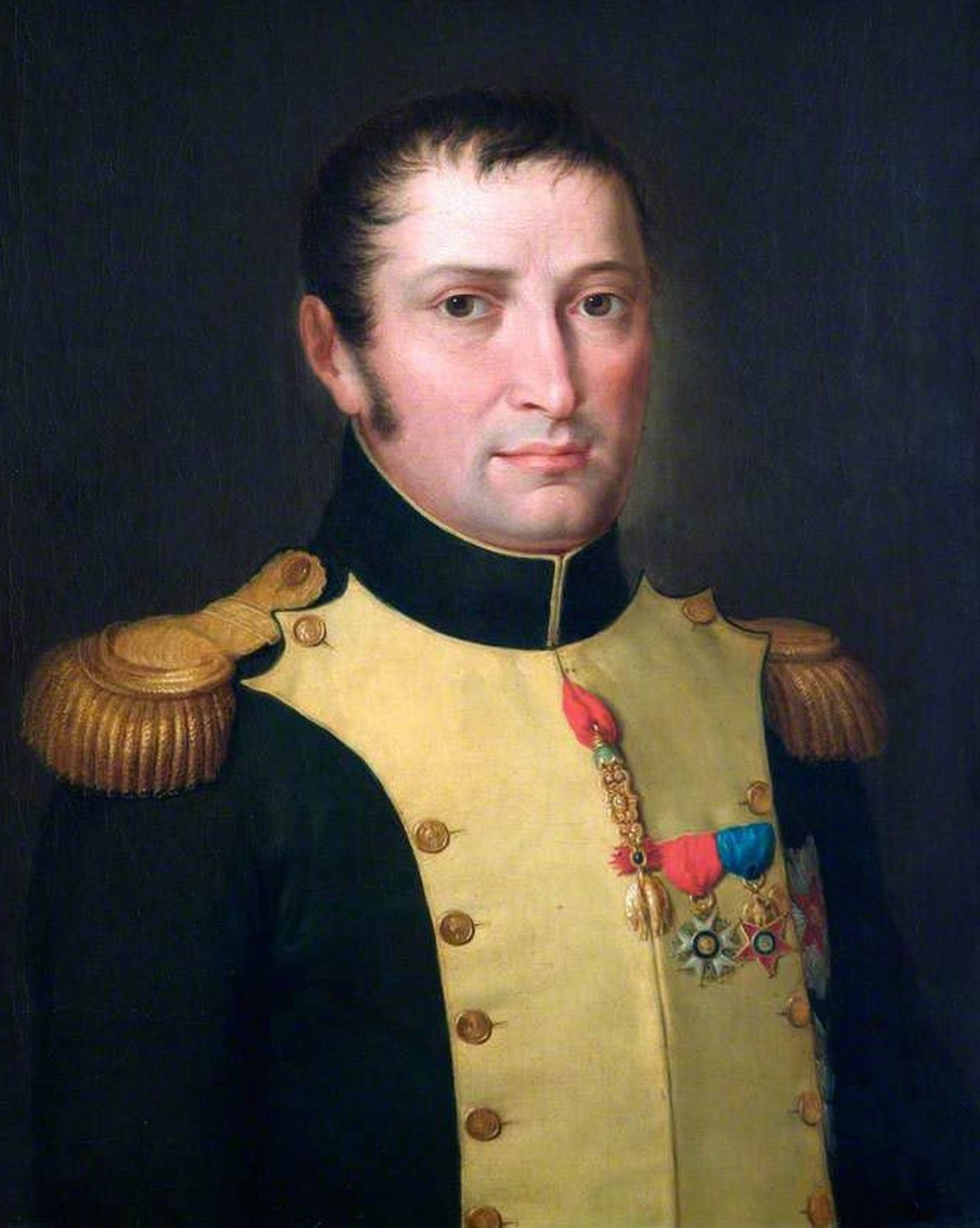
Joseph Bonaparte

The Napoleonic Wars were taking place in Europe, involving France, Great Britain and most European countries. Portugal broke the blockade imposed on British trade and, as a result, was invaded by France. However, the Royal Family and the bulk of the kingdom's administration fled to colonial Brazil, in a move to preserve Portuguese sovereignty. Under the pretext of reinforcing the Franco-Spanish army occupying Portugal, French Imperial troops began filing into Spain. Shortly before the Spanish King Charles IV abdicated due to the mutiny of Aranjuez and gave the throne to his son, Ferdinand VII. Feeling that he was forced to abdicate, Charles IV requested that Napoleon restore him to power. Napoleon helped remove Ferdinand VII from power, but did not return the crown to the former king: instead, he crowned his own brother Joseph Bonaparte, as the new Spanish King. This whole process is known as the Abdications of Bayonne. Joseph's designation found severe resistance in Spain, and the Junta of Seville took power in the absence of the King. Until then, Spain had been an ally of France against Britain, but at this point the Spanish resistance changed sides and allied with Britain against France. The Junta of Seville was eventually defeated as well, being replaced by another one located in Cádiz.

== National causes ==
=== Spanish monopsony ===
During colonial times Spain was the only buyer of goods from the viceroyalty, and by law it was forbidden to trade with other nations. This situation damaged the viceroyalty, as Spain's economy was not powerful enough to buy and sell the quantities of goods that the Americas required. and many of them were even brought by Spain to France or Britain and then resold in the Americas at a higher price. Buenos Aires was even more damaged, as Spain did not send enough ships to the city. To prevent the risk of piracy the trade ships had to be followed by war ships, which made the journey very expensive. Lacking any gold or silver resources, or established indigenous populations to employ systems of encomienda, it was more profitable for Spain to send them all to Mexico or Lima. This led Buenos Aires to develop a system of smuggling to obtain, by illegal means, the products that could not be received otherwise. This smuggling was allowed by most local authorities, and developed similar amounts of traffic as the legal commerce with Spain. This whole situation developed two antagonistic groups: the ones who made leather products and wanted free commerce to be able to sell them, and the ones who benefited from the prices of the smuggled products, which would have to sell them at lower prices if such commerce was allowed.

=== Social rivalries ===
In the political structure most authoritative positions were filled by people designated by the Spanish monarchy, most of them Spanish people from Europe, without strong commitments to American problems or interests. This created a growing rivalry between the Criollos, people born in America, and the Peninsulares, people arrived from Europe (the term "Criollo" is usually translated to English as "Creole", despite being unrelated to most other Creole peoples). Despite the fact that all of them were considered Spanish, and that there was no legal distinction between Criollos and Peninsulares, most Criollos thought that Peninsulares had undue weight in political conflicts and expected a higher intervention in them, sentiment shared by the lower clergy. This practice was mainly the result of social prejudice. Criollos were also angered by the ease of immigrants from Spain, regardless of having humble origins, to acquire properties and social distinction that was negated to them. This rivalry evolved later into a rivalry between supporters of becoming autonomous from Spain and supporters of keeping things the way they were. However, this process was much slower than the one experimented by the British colonies in North America, in part because the educative system was managed almost exclusively by the clergy, influencing the development of a population as conservative as in the mother country.

Unlike the European countries and, to some degree, the United States, the Spanish colonies lacked a sense of peoplehood, a needed factor for the development of a nation. The Spanish colonies were carefully designed as extensions of Spain itself, being completely dependent in economic, cultural and political terms to the mother country.

=== British Invasions of the Río de la Plata ===
Beresford surrenders to Santiago de Liniers. Work by Charles Fouqueray.

Buenos Aires and Montevideo had successfully resisted two British invasions. The first one was in 1806, when a British army led by William Carr Beresford took control of Buenos Aires, until it was defeated by an army from Montevideo, led by Santiago de Liniers. The following year a bigger army took Montevideo, but failed to take Buenos Aires, being forced to surrender and leave both cities. There was no Spanish aid from Europe either time, and to prepare for the second invasion Liniers formed militias with Criollos, despite regulations prohibiting such militias. This gave them military power and political influence they did not have before, with the biggest Criollo army being the Patricios Regiment led by Cornelio Saavedra. This victory achieved without help also boosted confidence in independence, by showing that Spanish aid was not needed. The prestige earned by Buenos Aires before the other cities of the viceroyalty was exploited by Juan José Paso during the open cabildo to justify taking immediate action and hearing the opinions of other cities afterwards.

=== Carlotism ===
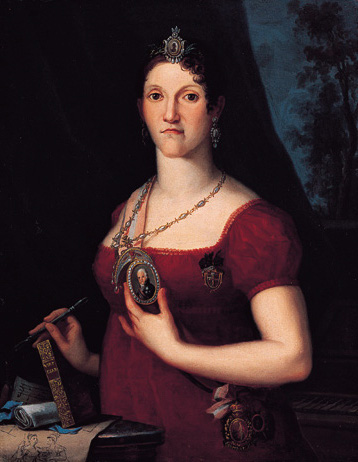
Carlota Joaquina of Spain desired to rule the Spanish colonies.

By the ending of 1808 the whole Royal Family of Portugal left Europe, with the country being attacked by Napoleon, and settled in Brazil. The regent prince arrived with his wife, Charlotte Joaquina, daughter of Charles IV and sister of Ferdinand VII. When the news of the imprisonment of Ferdinand VII arrived in South America, Charlotte tried to take control of the viceroyalties as regent, a project known as Carlotism. She could do so due to the derogation of the salic law by Charles IV in 1789, and she intended to prevent a French invasion in the Americas. Some Criollos like Castelli, Beruti, Vieytes and Belgrano supported the project, considering it a chance to get a local government instead of one in Europe, or a medium for a later declaration of independence. Other Criollos like Moreno, Paso or Saavedra were critics of it, as well as most peninsular Spaniards and Viceroy Liniers. They suspected the whole project of concealing Portuguese ambitions in the region, and her public image wasn't positive: the people around her in Brazil (like the infant Pedro Carlos de Bourbon), and her relations with her husband, caused strong public dislike. Charlotte also rejected her supporters, as they intended her to lead a constitutional monarchy, while she wanted to retain an absolute monarchy. Britain, with strong presence in Portugal, also opposed the project: they did not want to let Spain, now allied with them against France, be split into many kingdoms, and did not consider Charlotte able to prevent separatism.

== See also ==
- May Revolution
