= Titi Pinkillu =

Mountain in Bolivia

- Location within Bolivia

Highest point
- Elevation: 4,529 m (14,859 ft)
- Coordinates: 19°21′26″S 65°33′27″W

Geography
- Location: Bolivia, Potosí Department
- Parent range: Andes

Titi Pinkillu (Quechua titi lead, lead-colored, pinkillu a flute of the Andean region, "lead-colored pinkillu", Hispanicized spelling Titi Pinquillo) is a 4,529-metre-high (14,859 ft) mountain in the Bolivian Andes. It is situated in the Potosí Department, Cornelio Saavedra Province, Tacobamba Municipality, near the border with the Tomás Frías Province, Potosí Municipality. Titi Pinkillu lies north-east of the lake Urqu Qucha. This is also where the Challwiri River, an affluent of the Pillku Mayu, originates.
