= Memoria autógrafa =

1829 autobiography by Cornelio Saavedra

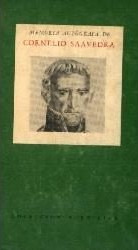
Book cover of the Emece reedition

Memoria autógrafa is an autobiography written in 1829 by Cornelio Saavedra, president of the Primera Junta. Saavedra was of old age by then, and wrote from his perspective the different historical events where he was involved, such as the fight in the British invasions of the Río de la Plata, the suffocation of the riot of Álzaga or the May Revolution. Saavedra wrote the book for his sons, because his political image was severely questioned by that time and wanted them to be able to know his own version of things. He told that "the duty of all men to protect his good name is the only thing that has driven my defenses".

The book was reedited many times, such as by Emecé in 1944, Eudeba in 1968, or Carlos Pérez editor in 1969. In 2009 there was a new reedition of the book by Del Nuevo Extremo publisher, as part of the "Biblioteca Nacional de Identidad" book series devoted to biographies. The 2009 edition included as well three mailings, one from Carlos Francisco Dumouriez to Saavedra, another from Saavedra to Juan José Viamonte and a third one to his lawyer Juan de la Rosa during his trial.

== See also ==
- Cornelio Saavedra
