= Urqu Qucha (Bolivia) =

Lake in the Potosí Department, Bolivia

- Location within Bolivia Location within South America
- Interactive map of Urqu Qucha
- Location: Bolivia, Potosí Department, Cornelio Saavedra Province
- Coordinates: 19°22′04″S 65°33′53″W
- Surface area: 0.124 km^{2} (0.048 sq mi) (0.0479 sq mi)

Urqu Qucha (Quechua urqu mountain / male, qucha lake, "mountain lake" or "male lake", also spelled Orkho Khocha) is a lake in the Andes of Bolivia. It is located in the Potosí Department, Cornelio Saavedra Province, Tacobamba Municipality, at the border with the Tomás Frías Province, Potosí Municipality. Urqu Qucha lies south-west of the mountain Titi Pinkillu and north of the Challwiri River, an affluent of the Pillku Mayu.
