= Qiñwa Qullu =

Andean Mountain

- Location within Bolivia

Highest point
- Elevation: 4,160 m (13,650 ft)
- Coordinates: 19°18′52″S 65°39′26″W

Geography
- Location: Bolivia; Potosí Department
- Parent range: Andes

Qiñwa Qullu (Aymara qiñwa a kind of tree, qullu mountain, "qiñwa mountain", also spelled Kheñwa Kkollu) is a mountain in the Andes of Bolivia which reaches a height of approximately 4,160 m (13,650 ft). It is located in the Potosí Department, Cornelio Saavedra Province, Tacobamba Municipality. Qiñwa Qullu lies on the left bank of the Ch'aki Mayu (Quechua for "dry river"). Its waters flow to the Pillku Mayu (Quechua for "red river"):
