= Betanzos Municipality =

- Municipality
- Location within Bolivia
- Coordinates: 19°27′S 65°13′W
- Country: Bolivia
- Department: Potosí Department
- Province: Cornelio Saavedra Province
- Seat: Betanzos
- Elevation: 10,800 ft (3,300 m)

Population (2012)
  - Total: 33,455
  - Ethnicities: Quechua
- Time zone: UTC-4 (BOT)

Betanzos Municipality is the first municipal section of the Cornelio Saavedra Province in the Potosí Department in Bolivia. Its seat is Betanzos.

== Subdivision ==
The municipality consists of the following cantons:

- Betanzos
- Otuyo
- Poco Poco
- Potobamba
- Siporo
- Tecoya
- Puita
- Villa El Carmen
