= Cornelio Saavedra =

Argentine military officer and statesman (1759–1829)

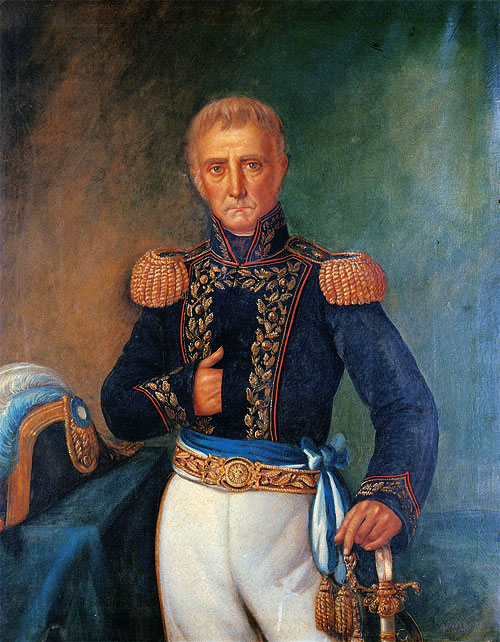
- Portrait of Saavedra by B. Marcel, c. 1865

1st President of the Primera Junta and the Junta Grande in the United Provinces of the Río de la Plata
- In office May 25, 1810 – August 26, 1811
- Preceded by: Office established
- Succeeded by: Domingo Matheu

Personal details
- Born: September 15, 1759 Otuyo, Viceroyalty of Peru
- Died: March 29, 1829 (aged 69) Buenos Aires, United Provinces of the Río de la Plata
- Resting place: La Recoleta Cemetery
- Party: Patriot
- Spouses: Maria Francisca Cabrera y Saavedra (m. 1788; died 1798); Doña Saturnina Otárola del Rivero (m. 1801)
- Children: Three
- Education: Real Colegio San Carlos
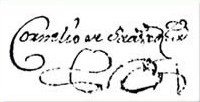
- Signature

Military service
- Allegiance: Viceroyalty of the Río de la Plata; United Provinces of the Río de la Plata
- Years of service: 1806–1811
- Commands: Regiment of Patricians
- Battles/wars: British invasions of the River Plate; Mutiny of Álzaga

Cornelio Judas Tadeo de Saavedra y Rodríguez (September 15, 1759 – March 29, 1829) was an Argentine military officer and statesman. He was instrumental in the May Revolution, the first step of Argentina's independence from Spain, and became the first head of state of the autonomous country that would become Argentina when he was appointed president of the Primera Junta.

Saavedra was the first commanding officer of the Regiment of Patricians created after the ill-fated British invasions of the River Plate. The increased militarization of the city and the relaxation of the system of castas allowed him, as other criollo peoples, to become a prominent figure in local politics. His intervention was decisive to thwart the Mutiny of Álzaga and allow viceroy Santiago de Liniers to stay in power. Although he supported the establishment of a Junta similar those created in Spain during the Peninsular War, he desired that criollos had an important role in it (the mutiny of Álzaga was promoted by peninsulars). He advised against rushed actions as well, and as his regiment was crucial in any action against the viceroy, he denied his help until it was a good strategic moment to do so. The opportunity came in May 1810, and the May Revolution successfully ousted the viceroy.

Saavedra was appointed president of the Primera Junta, which took government after it. The local politics were soon divided between him and the secretary Mariano Moreno. Saavedra wanted gradual changes, while Moreno promoted more radical ones. Saavedra encouraged the expansion of the Junta with deputies from the other provinces; this left Moreno in a minority, and he resigned. A later rebellion made on behalf of Saavedra forced the remaining supporters of Moreno to resign as well. He left the presidency after the defeat of the first Upper Peru campaign, and headed to lead the Army of the North. His absence was exploited by political opponents, who established the First Triumvirate and issued an arrest warrant against Saavedra. Saavedra stayed in exile until 1818, when all the charges against him were dropped.

== Biography ==
=== Early life ===
Saavedra was born at the hacienda "La Fombera", located in the town of Otuyo, near the former Imperial City of Potosí. The city was part of the Spanish Viceroyalty of Peru by that time, but would be annexed into the Viceroyalty of the Río de la Plata some years later. His father was Santiago Felipe de Saavedra y Palma, a native of Buenos Aires, whose ancestry reached to Hernando Arias de Saavedra. His mother was María Teresa Rodríguez Michel, a native of the Villa Imperial de Potosi. Santiago had left Buenos Aires and married María. They were a wealthy family, with many sons, Cornelio being the last one. The family moved to Buenos Aires in 1767. There, during his adolescence, Cornelio attended the Real Colegio de San Carlos. The school was only for the elite, and to attend it was required to be allowed by the viceroy, know reading and writing, be at least ten years old, be a legitimate son and have certified limpieza de sangre; Saavedra met all the requirements. He studied philosophy and Latin Grammar between 1773 and 1776. However, he could not graduate due to overwhelming duties in the management of the family ranch. Unlike other rich youths of the time, he did not go to university.

In 1788, he married Maria Francisca Cabrera y Saavedra, his cousin. Francisca was rich, and it is likely that it was an arranged marriage. They had three sons, Diego, Mariano and Manuel. Francisca died in 1798. Saavedra began his political career in 1797, working at the Buenos Aires Cabildo, assuming various administrative roles. By then, the city had become the capital of the Viceroyalty of the Rio de la Plata. His first political appointment was as fourth alderman, and third alderman the following year. In 1801, he was appointed Mayor of First Vote. That same year he married his second wife, Doña Saturnina Otárola del Rivero. In 1805, he was appointed to the position of Grain manager, within a local governmental body that dealt with the provision of wheat and other cereals in the city. It is considered that Saavedra supported the proposals of Manuel Belgrano at the Commerce Consulate of Buenos Aires, which promoted agriculture, education and industrialization, but there is no definitive evidence of it.

=== British invasions ===
William Carr Beresford surrenders to Santiago de Liniers during the British invasions of the River Plate.

Buenos Aires was involved in the British invasions of the River Plate in 1806, when a British expeditionary force led by William Carr Beresford captured the city. Saavedra was still a civilian by then. Santiago de Liniers organized a force in Montevideo to re-capture Buenos Aires, and Saavedra was among the civilians that joined Liniers, despite the lack of military instruction. His role in this battle was a minor one. Liniers successfully re-captured Buenos Aires, and organized the city's defences against a possible British counter-attack. All the male population of the city aged from 16 to 50 was drafted into the military, and divided in battalions by casta or origin. The largest one was the Regiment of Patricians, made up of volunteer infantrymen born in Buenos Aires. The regiment was composed of three infantry battalions, commanded by Esteban Romero, Domingo Urien and Manuel Belgrano, who would later pass that command to Juan José Viamonte. Each battalion could elect their own leaders, including their commander, and the Regiment of Patricians elected Saavedra.

The British launched another invasion in 1807 led by John Whitelocke. Saavedra marched to Montevideo, but was informed at Colonia del Sacramento of the capture of the city of British, who intended to use it as a staging point for their planned invasion of Buenos Aires. To frustrate further British operations, Saavedra ordered the withdrawal of all military hardware from Colonia, considered indefensible at that point, and mobilized those troops and equipment to Buenos Aires to fortify the city. The renewed attack to Buenos Aires took place shortly afterwards, the British force consisting of 8,000 soldiers and 18 cannons—significantly more than the 1,565 men and 8 cannons used for the first invasion attempt. After defeating local forces at the pens of Miserere, the British entered the city of Buenos Aires on July 5.

The British encountered an extremely hostile population, prepared to resist to the degree that even women, children and slaves voluntarily participated in the defense. The headquarters of the Regiment of Patricians were located at the Real Colegio de San Carlos, where Saavedra and Juan José Viamonte repulsed a British column under the command of Denis Pack and Henry Cadogan, composed of numerous infantrymen and a cannon. Pack subsequently united his remaining troops with Craufurd's men and made a last stand inside the Santo Domingo convent. Cadogan took the nearby house of Pedro Medrano, and fired at the Spanish from the rooftop before Pack and Cadogan's men were finally overwhelmed by local troops. Finally, Whitelocke surrendered, pledging to withdraw all British forces from Montevideo, which brought the second invasion to an end.

The victory against the British brought forth great changes in the politics of Buenos Aires. The viceroy Sobremonte was discredited by his management of the conflict, and the Cabildo increased its influence; as such, it removed the viceroy and appointed Liniers as replacement, an unprecedented action. The local criollos, who had limited chances of social promotion in the system of castas, got such a chance with the increased influence of the militias. Cornelio Saavedra, head of the biggest criollo militia, thus became a highly influential man in the politics of Buenos Aires. He resented the weak support from the Spanish monarchy to the war effort, compared with the strong one received from the cabildos of other cities in the Americas. As a result, he was loyal to the new viceroy, of French ancestry, considering him to be less subject to the internal disputes of the House of Bourbon.

=== The mutiny of Álzaga ===
The outbreak of the Peninsular War in Spain and the capture of the King Ferdinand VII by the French generated a political crisis in the Spanish colonies in America. The first project to maintain the monarchy was the short-lived Carlotism, which sought to crown Carlota Joaquina as regent. This project was supported by criollos like Manuel Belgrano and Juan José Castelli, but whether Saavedra supported it is disputed. The Carlotism was abandoned soon afterwards, and the people sought other projects.

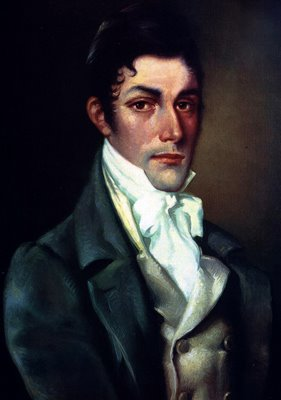
Martín de Álzaga sought to depose the viceroy Liniers. By defeating his mutiny, Saavedra increased his political power.

Francisco Javier de Elío established a Junta in Montevideo, similar to the ones established in Spain during the war, and his ally in Buenos Aires, Martín de Álzaga, sought to do a similar thing. The Mutiny of Álzaga took place on January 1, 1809. He accused Liniers of trying to appoint loyal members to the Cabildo, and gathered a small demonstration to request his resignation. The rebels, backed by some peninsular militias, occupied the Plaza. Liniers was about to resign, to prevent further conflicts.

Cornelio Saavedra, who was aware of the conspiracy, considered it a plot by peninsulars to secure political power over the criollo peoples. He marched with the Regiment of Patricians swiftly to the Plaza, and thwarted the mutiny. There was no violence in the operation, as the criollos forced the rebels to give up just by the sheer force of numbers. Thus, Liniers stayed in office as viceroy. All the heads of the mutiny were sentenced to prison at Carmen de Patagones, and the militias that took part in it were dissolved. The only peninsular militias remaining were those of Andaluces and Montañeses, who did not join the mutiny; criollos obtained the military command, and the political power of Saavedra increased even more.

A few months later, the Junta of Seville appointed a new Viceroy, Baltasar Hidalgo de Cisneros. Some patriots proposed a self-coup to keep Liniers in power and resist the new viceroy, but Saavedra and Liniers himself did not accept it and the transition was performed without problems. Although Saavedra supported the plans of the criollos to seize power, he warned about taking rushed measures, considering that the ideal time to do so would be when the Napoleonic forces achieved a decisive advantage in the Spanish conflict. Until then, he forced the other revolutionaries to stay quiet by denying the help of his regiment. His usual quote was "Peasants and gentlemen, it is not yet time – let the figs ripen, and then we'll eat them." Although he was sometimes suspected of sympathy for Cisneros for his reluctance to take action against him, he maintained his strategy. Saavedra's political moderation may have been influenced by his previous career in the Cabildo.

=== The May Revolution ===
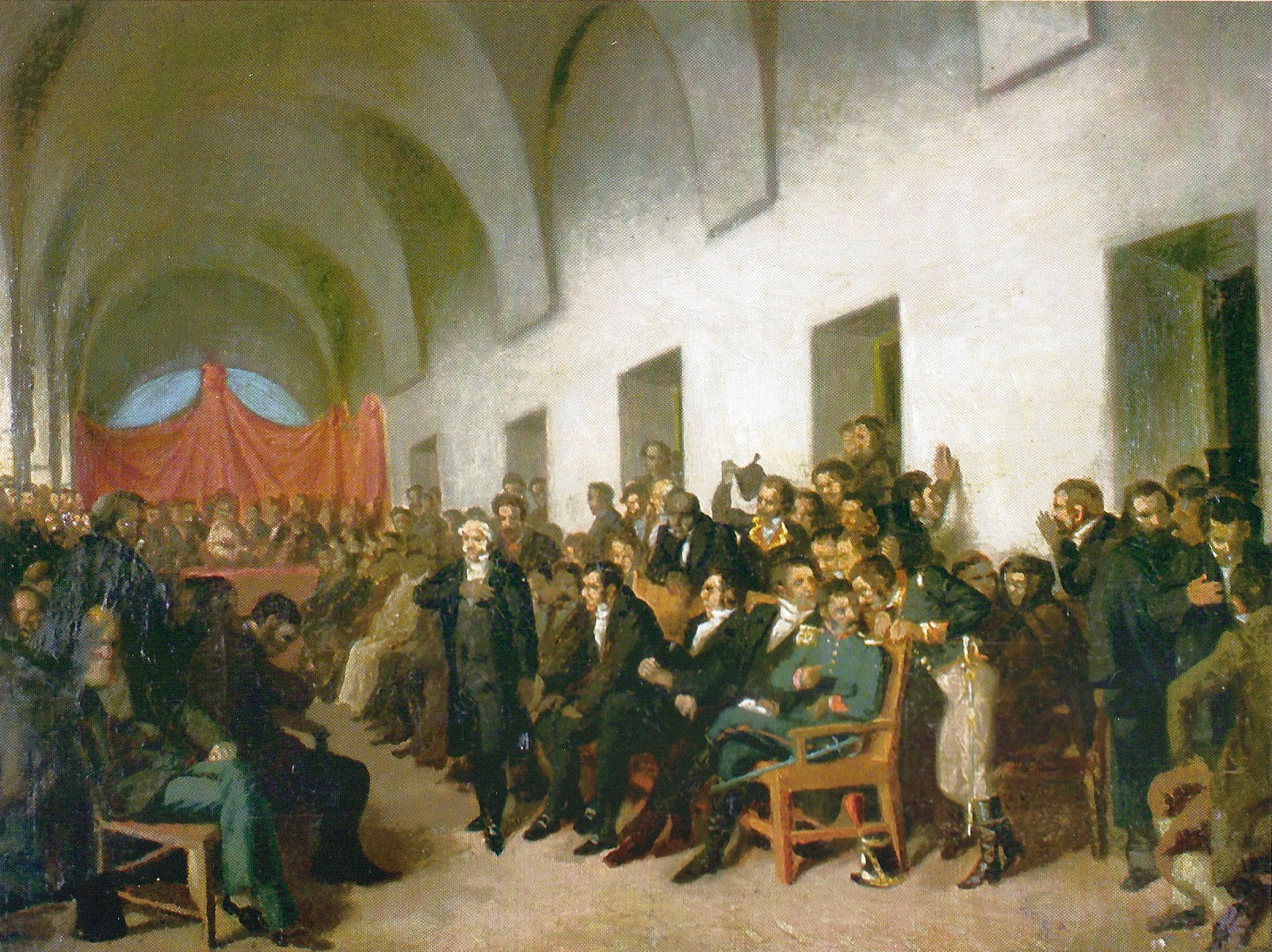
The open cabildo, by Juan Manuel Blanes, during Saavedra's speech.

The chance expected by Saavedra came in May 1810, when two British ships arrived with the latest news of the Peninsular War. The previous January Seville was invaded, the Junta of Seville ceased working, and some members took refuge at Cadiz and Leon, the last undefeated Spanish provinces. The complete Spanish defeat seemed imminent. The viceroy tried to conceal the information by seizing all newspapers, but some of them were leaked into the possession of the revolutionaries. Colonel Viamonte called Saavedra and informed him of the news, requesting once again his military support. Saavedra agreed that it was a good context to proceed, and gave his famous answer: "Gentlemen: now I say it is not only time, but we must not waste a single hour."

Cisneros called Saavedra and Martín Rodríguez, and requested their military support in the case of a popular rebellion. They refused to give such support, and Saavedra argued that Cisneros should resign because the Junta of Seville that had appointed him did not exist anymore. As a result, Cisneros gave in to the request of Juan José Castelli: to celebrate an open cabildo, an extraordinary meeting of the noteworthy peoples of the city, and discuss the situation. The next day an armed mob, led by Antonio Beruti and Domingo French, occupied the Plaza to demand the making of the open cabildo, doubting that Cisneros would actually allow it. Saavedra addressed the crowd and assured them that the Regiment of Patricians supported their claims.

The open cabildo was held on May 22. The people discussed if Cisneros should stay in power and, in the case he was removed from office, which type of government should be established. Saavedra stayed silent for the most part, awaiting his turn to speak. The most important speakers were Bishop Benito Lué y Riega, Juan José Castelli, Ruiz Huidobro, Manuel Genaro Villota, Juan José Paso and Juan Nepomuceno de Sola, among others. Saavedra was the last one to speak, and suggested that the political control should be delegated to the Cabildo until the formation of a governing Junta, in the manner and form that the Cabildo deemed appropriate. In his speech, he pointed out the phrase: "(...) "And there be no doubt that it is the people that confers the authority or command." This statement was in line with the Retroversion of the sovereignty to the people, a political concept formulated by Castelli, stating that in the absence of the rightful governor the sovereignty returned to the peoples, who had then the power to give it to someone else. Castelli aligned his position with Saavedra's, becoming the common position which was eventually passed with 87 votes.

However, the Cabildo appointed a Junta headed by Cisneros, who would stay in power, even if under a new office. Saavedra was appointed to this Junta, as well as Castelli and two peninsulars. They made the oath of office, but the Junta was received with strong popular unrest, as it was perceived as going contrary to the result of the open cabildo. By the night, Saavedra and Castelli resigned, convincing Cisneros to do the same.

The people gathered in front of the Buenos Aires Cabildo

The Cabildo rejected Cisneros' resignation, and ordered the military to control the crowd and enforce the resolution of the previous day. The commanders pointed out that if they did so, their soldiers would mutiny. As the demonstration overran some sections of the cabildo, Cisneros' resignation was finally accepted. The members of the new Junta were the result of a document with hundreds of signatures, drafted among the people in the plaza. Cornelio Saavedra was the president of this Junta. He rejected this at first, fearing that he may be suspected of promoting the revolution for personal interest, but finally accepted at Cisneros' request. As the Junta was established on May 25, the other cities were invited to send deputies to a constituent assembly to discuss the type of government; on May 27, they were invited to send deputies to join the Junta. Both invitations were contradictory, but the consequences would take place some months later.

The precise authorship of the aforementioned document is unclear, and so is the origin of the composition of the Junta. Saavedra said in his memoirs that it was "the people", without being more precise. As he protested being appointed president, he could not be part of the negotiations (Manuel Belgrano and Mariano Moreno, other members, are reported to have been appointed without their consent as well). It could not have been the Regiments of Patricians either: the Junta was not a military junta (only two of nine members were military), and the regiment would not have appointed Moreno, whose rivalry with Saavedra was known. A common accepted theory considers it to be a balance between Carlotists and Alzaguists.

The presidency of the Junta was the result of the high influence of the militias in general and Saavedra in particular in the local politics. From that time on, he spent most of his time at the fort of Buenos Aires, managing the government with Moreno, Belgrano and Castelli. It is likely that he left his business for this.

=== The Primera Junta ===
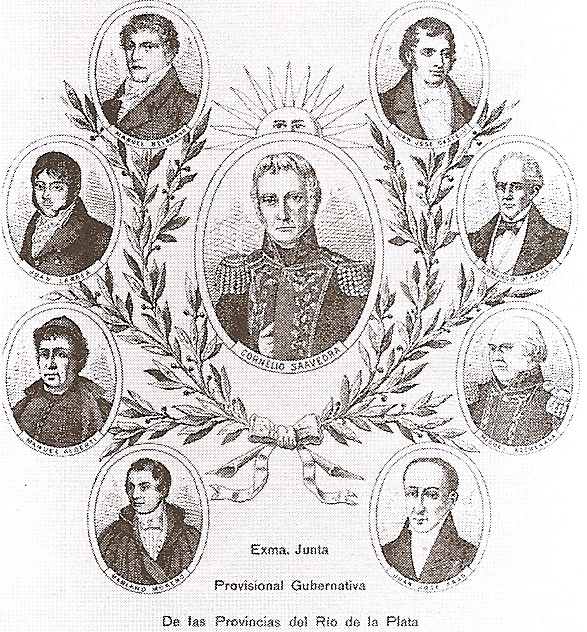
Lithography of the members of the Primera Junta, with Saavedra in the middle.

Cornelio Saavedra was aware that the Junta would be resisted by factions still loyal to the old authorities. It was resisted locally by the Cabildo and the Royal Audiencia; the nearby plazas of Montevideo and Paraguay did not recognize it; and Santiago de Liniers organized a counter-revolution at Córdoba. During this early period, the Junta worked united against the royalist threats. Mariano Moreno, the secretary of war, drafted the decrees and regulations to deal with royalists. First, a decree ordered punishment for anyone attempting to generate disputes, and for those concealing conspiracies against the Junta or other people. The Royal Audiencia swore loyalty to the Regency Council, in defiance to the Junta, so they were summoned, along with former viceroy Cisneros, and exiled to Spain with the pretext that there was a threat to their lives. The Junta appointed new members for the Audiencia loyal to the revolution. Moreno organized as well the Paraguay campaign and the First Upper Peru campaign, to the plazas that resisted the Junta. The second one, headed by Francisco Ortiz de Ocampo, would move to Córdoba and attack the counter-revolution; before marching to Upper Peru. Ocampo's initial orders were to capture the counter-revolutionary leaders and send them to Buenos Aires, so that they could be judged. When the counter-revolution became stronger Moreno called the Junta and proposed that the enemy leaders should be shot as soon as they were captured instead of brought to trial. The new orders were carried out by Juan José Castelli. Cornelio Saavedra supported all these measures.

However, as time passed, Saavedra and Moreno distanced from each other. There was some initial distrust in the Junta towards Saavedra, but it was just the result of his desire for honours and privileges rather than an actual power struggle. When the initial difficulties were solved, Saavedra promoted an indulgent policy, while Moreno insisted on taking radical measures. For instance, the Junta discovered on October 16 that some members of the Cabildo secretly swore loyalty to the Regency Council. Moreno proposed executing them as a deterrent, and Saavedra replied that the government should promote leniency, and rejected the use of the Regiment of Patricians to carry out such executions. Saavedra prevailed, and the plotting members of the Cabildo were exiled instead of executed. Overall, Moreno was supported by "The Star" regiment, the other members of the Junta, and the activists of the May Revolution; Saavedra was supported by the merchants, the loyals to the old regime that saw him as a lesser evil, and the Regiment of Patricians, which was the largest one.

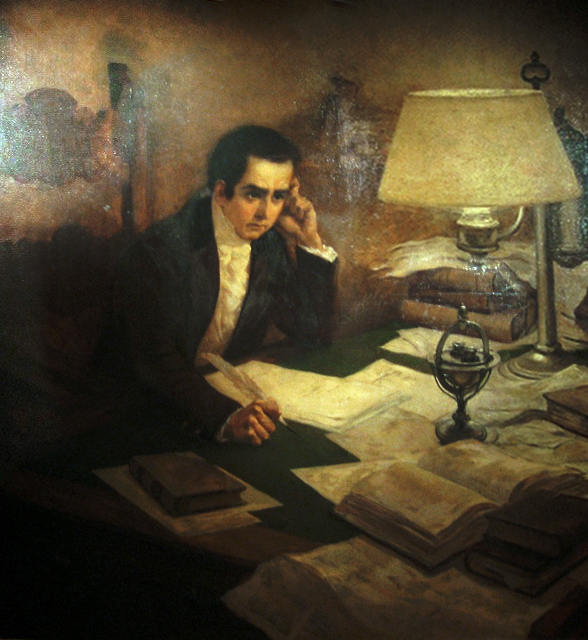
Mariano Moreno, secretary of war of the Primera Junta.

To counter the power of Saavedra, Moreno sought to modify the military balance of power by reforming the promotion rules. Up until that point, the sons of officials were automatically granted the status of cadet and were promoted just by seniority; Moreno arranged that promotions were earned by military merits instead. However, in the short run this measure worked against him, as it antagonised members of the military who got promoted precisely because of such rules.

Saavedra thought that the victory at the battle of Suipacha strengthened his perspective, as the Junta would have defeated its enemies. He considered that Moreno's animosity was rooted in the aforementioned mutiny of Álzaga, as Moreno took part in it. The victory was celebrated at the barracks of the Patricians, where the officer Anastasio Duarte, who was drunk, made a toast to Saavedra, as if he was America’s king. Moreno drafted the Honours Suppression decree when he knew about it, which suppressed the ceremonies and privileges of the president of the Junta inherited from the former office of viceroy. However, Saavedra signed it without complaint. The Regiment of Patricians resented Moreno because of this, but Saavedra considered that it was a disproportionated response to a trivial issue.

The arrival of the deputies called months ago generated disputes about the role they should have. Mariano Moreno supported the May 25 invitation, and wrote at the Gazeta de Buenos Ayres newspaper that the deputies should create a constituent assembly. Most of them, however, were aligned with the more moderated style of Saavedra. Led by Gregorio Funes from Córdoba, they requested to join the Junta, as told in the second invitation. Saavedra and Funes thought that, with this change, Moreno would be left in a minority group, unable to advance his more radical measures.

The deputies and the Junta met on December 18, to decide what to do. Funes, who was close to Saavedra, argued that Buenos Aires had no right to appoint national authorities by itself and expect obedience from the provinces. The nine deputies voted for their incorporation, as did Larrea, Azcuénaga, Matheu and Alberti, founding members of the Junta. Saavedra declared that the incorporation was not fully legal, but that he supported it for public convenience. Only Juan José Paso voted with Moreno against the incorporation of the deputies. Left in a minority within the Junta, Moreno resigned. He was appointed to a diplomatic mission in Europe, but died in high seas, in unclear circumstances. Some historians consider that Saavedra plotted to murder Moreno, others that it was a negligence of the captain, and others that it was because of Moreno's frail health.

=== The Junta Grande ===
With the new members, the Junta was renamed as Junta Grande. Cornelio Saavedra, who continued being president, had a clear control of it, together with Gregorio Funes. Although Moreno was no longer part of the Junta, his former supporters still plotted against Saavedra, meeting at the "Café de Marcos". They accused Funes and Saavedra of being carlotists. The regiment of Domingo French attempted to mutiny, but they were discovered and defeated. It is unknown if Moreno was involved in this attempted mutiny or not.

The dispute was finally settled by the Revolution of the shoreline dwellers. The mayors Tomás Grigera and Joaquín Campana, supporters of Saavedra, led the "shoreline dwellers" (Spanish: orilleros, poor people living in the outskirts of Buenos Aires) to the Plaza, along with the Regiment of Patricians, and demanded the resignation of the morenists Hipólito Vieytes, Azcuénaga, Larrea and Rodríguez Peña, appointing the Saavedrists Juan Alagón, Atanasio Gutiérrez, Feliciano Chiclana and Campana as their replacements. It was requested as well that the government should not change its political style without voting it first. However, although the revolution was done in support of Saavedra, Saavedra denied having any involvement in it, and condemned it in his autobiography.

Saavedra began to lose political power from this point. The decree of Mariano Moreno that changed the military promotions, which was never derogated, began to bear fruit, even if Moreno was not in the Junta anymore. The army became more professional, and less based on militias. Many of the new military authorities opposed Saavedra. The political crisis increased with the unfavourable military outcomes of the war: Belgrano was defeated at the Paraguay campaign, Castelli at the Upper Peru campaign, and the capture of Montevideo became increasingly difficult with the intervention of Portuguese troops supporting it. The many members of the Junta made the internal work difficult, as all measures were discussed by all members, hindering the swift reactions needed by the war. Saavedra left Buenos Aires at this point, and headed to the Upper Peru, to take command of the Army of the North. He thought that he could be of greater help as a military leader than facing the political struggles of Buenos Aires.

=== Economy under Saavedra ===
The economic policiey of Saavedra got in some aspect compared to perónist ones, due the "similar" state intervention in the economy.

=== Fall and persecution ===
Saavedra was warned by fellow members of the Junta, military leaders and even the Cabildo that if he left Buenos Aires, the government would be prone to fall into a political crisis. He left anyway, convinced that he would be able to reorganize the Army of the North. The warnings were justified; shortly after his departure, the Junta was turned into a legislative power, while the executive would be managed by the First Triumvirate. This arrangement lasted for a short time, then the Junta was abolished. The Regiment of Patricians made a mutiny against the triumvirate, but failed.

Saavedra received the news eight days after arriving in Salta. He was informed that he was deposed as president of the Junta, and that he should hand the command of the Army of the North to Juan Martín de Pueyrredón. Trying to avoid returning to Buenos Aires, he requested to be relocated at Tucumán or Mendoza. He was allowed to stay at the later city, rejoining his wife and children. The press of Buenos Aires was very harsh about him, so the Triumvirate asked the governor to capture Saavedra and send him to Luján, near Buenos Aires. The order, however, was never carried out because the triumvirate was deposed by the Revolution of October 8, 1812, and replaced by the Second Triumvirate.

The appointment of the supreme director Gervasio Antonio de Posadas fostered further hostilities towards Saavedra. Posadas was among the people banished in 1811, and made him a trial of residence as a revenge. Saavedra, defended by Juan de la Rosa Alba, was accused of organizing the 1811 revolution, along with Campana. The sentence ruled that Saavedra should be exiled, but he avoided it by crossing the Andes with his son and seeking political asylum at Chile. Juan José Paso requested the extradition of Saavedra, but the Chilean supreme director Francisco de la Lastra denied it. Saavedra did not stay in Chile for long; a huge royalist attack to Chile (which would end in the Disaster of Rancagua and the royalist reconquest of Chile) made him cross the Andes again and seek refuge at Mendoza, along with Chilean expatriates. José de San Martín, ruling Mendoza at the time, allowed him to settle in San Juan.

Saavedra settled in San Juan in 1814. He had a new son, Pedro Cornelio, and maintained a simple life growing grapes. He awaited the final decision of Posadas, but the supreme director had a political crisis at the time. The Spanish king Ferdinand VII had returned to the throne and demanded the colonies to return to their former organization, the royalists at Upper Peru were still a threat, and José Gervasio Artigas opposed Buenos Aires as well, because of its high centralism. As a result, Carlos María de Alvear became the new supreme director, who would decide the final fate of Cornelio Saavedra.

=== Last years ===
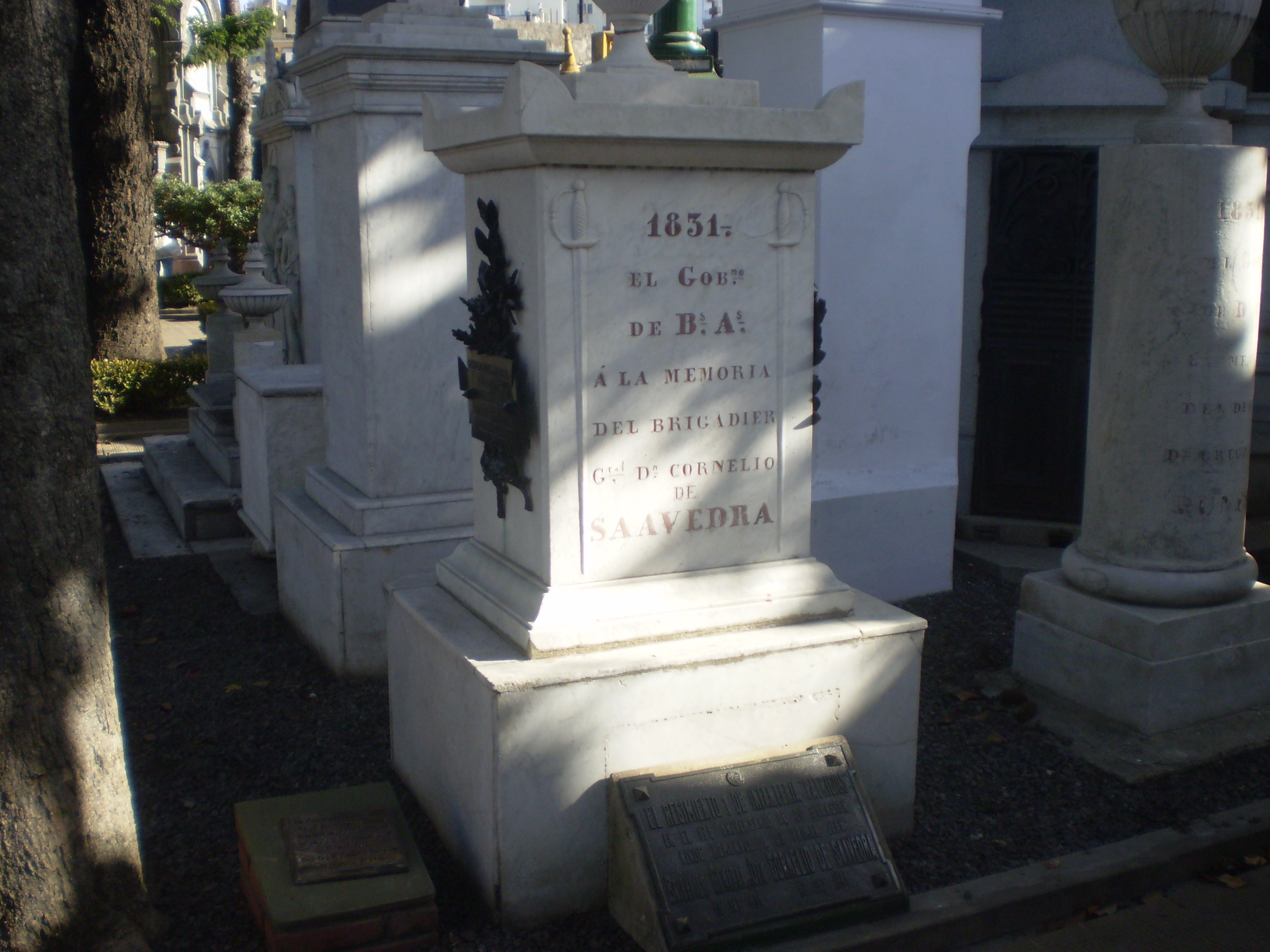
Tomb of Cornelio Saavedra at the La Recoleta Cemetery.

Alvear ordered Saavedra to move immediately to Buenos Aires, to close the case. He arrived to the city in time, and Alvear was sympathetic to his situation. However, Alvear was forced to resign a few days later, before being able to rule the case. The Buenos Aires Cabildo, the interim government, restored Saavedra's military rank and honours, but the rule was abolished by Ignacio Álvarez Thomas, the following supreme director. He moved then to the countryside, to live with his brother Luis. He kept requesting to the government the restoration of his rank.

Finally, the supreme director Juan Martín de Pueyrredón appointed a commission to discuss the case of Saavedra. By this time, the Congress of Tucumán had made the Argentine Declaration of Independence a couple of years before. The commission restored Saavedra with the military rank of brigadier, and ordered the payment of all the wages he did not receive during the time he was demoted. A second commission ratified the ruling. The payment was not enough to compensate Saavedra's losses, but he considered it a token of his restored prestige. He was appointed then to help with the protection of the frontier with the natives at Luján.

Angered with the passivity of Buenos Aires during the Luso-Brazilian invasion of the Banda Oriental, Francisco Ramírez from Entre Ríos and Estanislao López from Santa Fe joined forces against the city. Saavedra fled to Montevideo, fearing that Buenos Aires would be obliterated if defeated. Ramírez and López won the battle of Cepeda, but the city was not destroyed, so Saavedra returned. He retired in 1822, and lived with his family in the countryside. He offered his services at the beginning of the War of Brazil, despite being 65 years old, but Balcarce declined the offer. He wrote his memoirs, Memoria autógrafa, in 1828.

He died on March 29, 1829. He was taken to the cemetery by his sons. There was no state funeral at the time, because Juan Lavalle made a coup against the governor Manuel Dorrego and executed him, starting a period of civil war. Lavalle was defeated by Juan Manuel de Rosas, who was appointed governor. Once he restored peace, Rosas made a state funeral for Saavedra, on January 13, 1830.

== Legacy ==
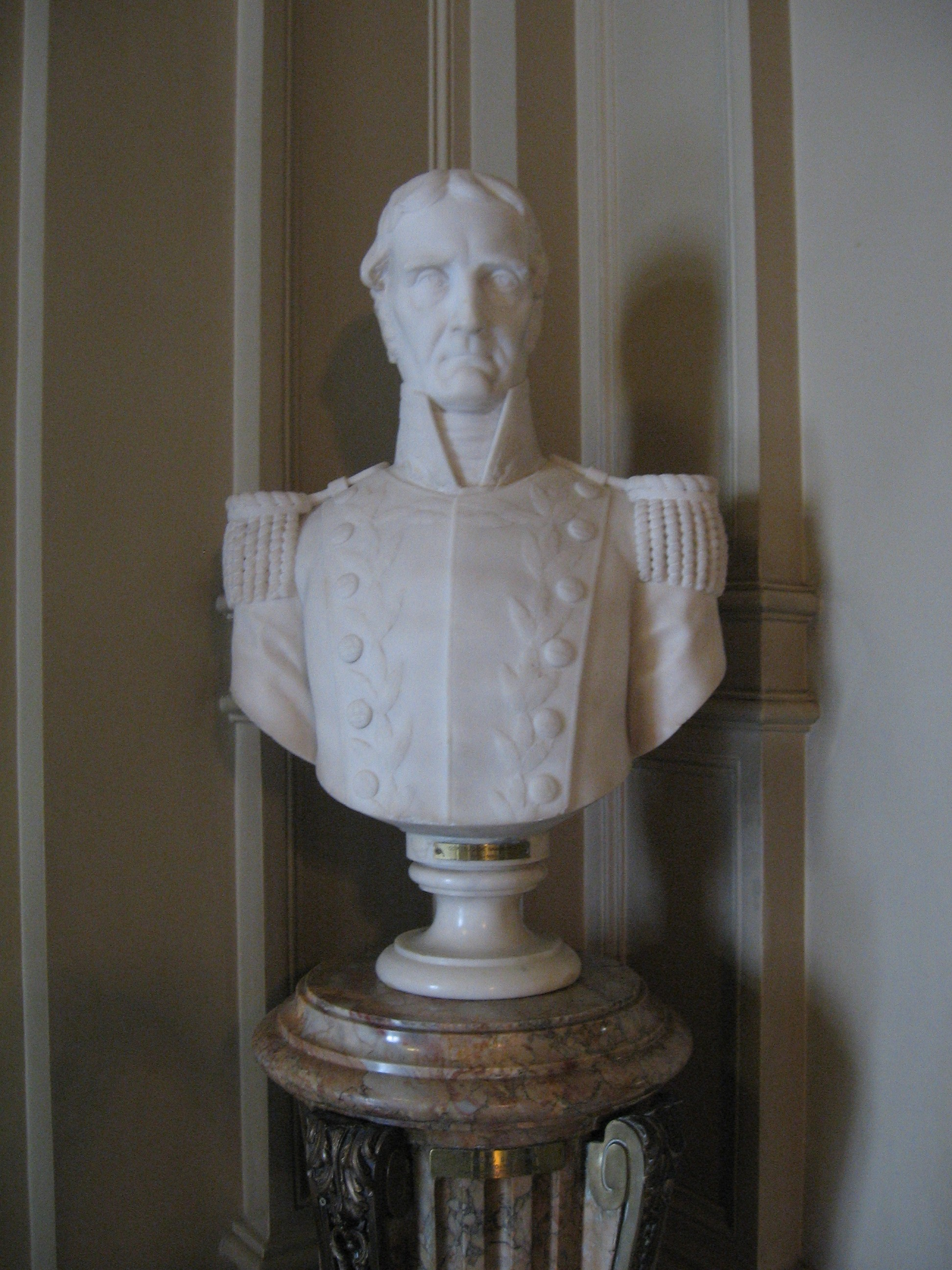
Bust of Cornelio Saavedra at the Casa Rosada.

As president of the first government body created after the May Revolution, Saavedra is considered the first ruler of Argentina. However, as the Spanish juntas were not a presidential system, Saavedra was not the first President of Argentina; that office would be created a decade afterwards. The Casa Rosada, official residence of the President of Argentina, holds a bust of Saavedra at the Hall of busts.

The Regiment of Patricians is still an active unit of the Argentine Army, currently as an air assault infantry. It is also the custodian of the Buenos Aires Cabildo, the welcoming party for visiting foreign dignitaries to Argentina and the escort and honor guard battalion for the City Government of Buenos Aires. As of September 22, 2010, the regiment's headquarters building has been declared as a National Historical Monument by the Argentine government, on the occasion of the country's bicentennial year.

The historiography of Cornelio Saavedra is closely related to that of Mariano Moreno. As Saavedra had a conflict with him in the Junta, the perspectives towards him complement those about Moreno. The first liberal historians praised Moreno as the leader of the Revolution and a great historical man; Saavedra was treated either as a weak man overwhelmed by Moreno, or as a counter-revolutionary. This perspective did not acknowledge that Saavedra, as head of the Regiment of Patricians, was the most popular and influential man of the city since before the Revolution, and that he was reported to be staunch, cunning and ruthless.

Subsequently, revisionist authors would formulate accusations against Moreno, depicting him as a British agent and a man of mere theoretical European ideas without a strong relation with the South American context. Saavedra is depicted instead as a popular caudillo, a predecessor of José de San Martín and Juan Manuel de Rosas. This perspective did not acknowledge that the wealthy citizens were aligned with Saavedra against Moreno, that Saavedra himself was wealthy and aristocratic, and that the 1811 revolution made no requests of a social nature, save for the removal of Morenist forces from the Junta.

== Descendants ==
Among his most prominent descendants must be mentioned his son Mariano Saavedra, twice governor of the Province of Buenos Aires between 1862 and 1865, his grandson Cornelio Saavedra Rodríguez, Chilean military officer in charge of the Occupation of Araucania, and his great-grandson Carlos Saavedra Lamas, politician and diplomat, Nobel Prize for Peace in 1936.

The Saavedra neighbourhood was founded in honor of his nephew Luis María Saavedra, a prominent businessman of the late nineteenth-century.

A descendant of his brother Luis Gonzaga Saavedra, León Ibáñez Saavedra, fathered Matilde Ibáñez Tálice, First Lady of Uruguay (1947–1951) and mother of Uruguayan President Jorge Batlle Ibáñez (2000–2005).

== Bibliography ==
- Galasso, Norberto (2004). Mariano Moreno – El sabiecito del sur. Buenos Aires: Colihue. ISBN 950-581-799-1.
- Luna, Félix (1999). Grandes protagonistas de la historia argentina: Cornelio Saavedra. Buenos Aires: Editorial Planeta Argentina. ISBN 950-49-0725-3.
- National Academy of History of Argentina (2010). Revolución en el Plata (in Spanish). Buenos Aires: Emece. ISBN 978-950-04-3258-0.
- Saavedra, Cornelio (2009). Memoria autógrafa. Buenos Aires: Editorial del Nuevo Extremo. ISBN 978-987-609-171-8.
- Abad de Santillán, Diego (1965). Historia Argentina (in Spanish). Buenos Aires: TEA (Tipográfica Editora Argentina).
- Scenna, Miguel Ángel (2009). Mariano Moreno. Buenos Aires: H. Garetto Editor. ISBN 978-987-1494-05-4.
